= Billy M. Minter =

United States Air Force general (1926–2005)

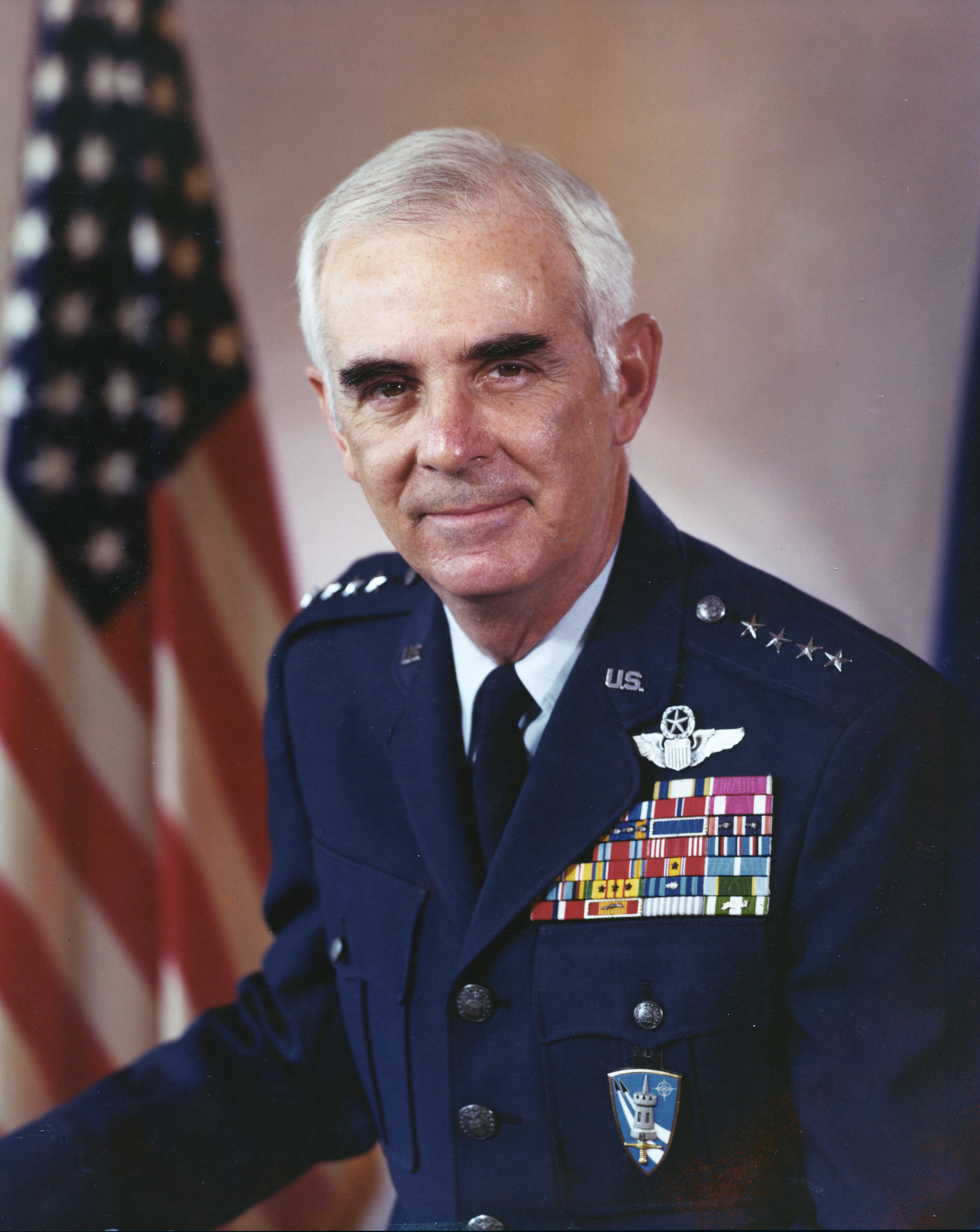
- General Billy M. Minter
- Born: July 13, 1926; Oklahoma City, Oklahoma
- Died: June 6, 2005 (aged 78); Bethesda, Maryland
- Burial place: Arlington National Cemetery
- Military career
- Allegiance: United States
- Branch: United States Air Force
- Service years: 1944–1984
- Rank: General
- Commands: Flight Commander 438th Fighter-Interceptor Squadron; 71st Fighter-Interceptor Squadron; 354th Tactical Fighter Squadron; United States Air Forces Europe; Allied Air Forces Central Europe
- Conflicts: World War II; Cold War; Korean War; Vietnam War

Billy Martin Minter (July 13, 1926 – June 6, 2005) was a four-star general in the United States Air Force (USAF). He served as commander in chief, United States Air Forces in Europe and commander of Allied Air Forces Central Europe, with headquarters at Ramstein Air Base, West Germany.

== Biography ==
Minter was born in Oklahoma City in 1926, and graduated from high school at Norman, Oklahoma, in 1944.

After service in World War II, Minter returned to the University of Oklahoma Norman. In October 1948 he entered the United States Air Force (USAF) as an aviation cadet and in September 1949 received his commission as a second lieutenant and his pilot wings.

His first assignment was to the Air Training Command as a flying instructor. From November 1949 to November 1950, he was a basic flying instructor in T-6 Texans at Randolph Air Force Base, Texas. He then served as an advanced flying instructor in the F-51 Mustang program at Craig Air Force Base, Alabama, until May 1952. After F-51 combat crew training at Luke Air Force Base, Arizona, in the summer of 1952, Minter reported to the 40th Fighter-Interceptor Squadron, 35th Fighter Group, at Johnson Air Base, Japan. The 40th was the last operational USAF unit equipped with F-51s. During three years with this squadron, he flew F-51s, F-80 Shooting Stars and F-86 Sabres.

In September 1955 he was assigned to the 438th Fighter-Interceptor Squadron, Air Defense Command, Kincheloe Air Force Base, Michigan, where he served as flight commander flying F-89 Scorpions. He also flew F-102 Delta Dagger and F-106 Delta Dart interceptors, and served as the group operations officer for the 507th Fighter Group.

Upon completing the Air Command and Staff College in August 1961, Minter reported to the 496th Fighter-Interceptor Squadron, Hahn Air Base, West Germany. During three years at Hahn, he flew the F-102 and served as squadron operations officer and chief of maintenance. Later he served as operations staff officer in the 86th Air Division's Directorate of Operations at Ramstein Air Base.

From December 1965 to August 1967, Minter served as operations officer and then commander of the 71st Fighter-Interceptor Squadron at Selfridge Air Force Base, Michigan He later served with the 94th Fighter-Interceptor Squadron.

After graduating with distinction from the Air War College in June 1968, he completed F-105 Thunderchief combat crew training with the 561st Tactical Fighter Squadron at McConnell Air Force Base, Kansas. He next reported to the 355th Tactical Fighter Wing at Takhli Royal Thai Air Force Base, Thailand, in January 1969. After five months as chief, combat operations, and assistant deputy commander for operations, Minter assumed command of the 354th Tactical Fighter Squadron. During his Southeast Asia tour of duty, he flew 106 combat missions during the Vietnam War in the F-105.

Returning to the United States in October 1969, he was assigned to the Air Force Logistics Command at the Sacramento Air Materiel Area (later redesignated Sacramento Air Logistics Center), McClellan Air Force Base, California. Following a year as chief, Quality Control Division, Directorate of Maintenance, he was assigned to the Directorate of Materiel Management.

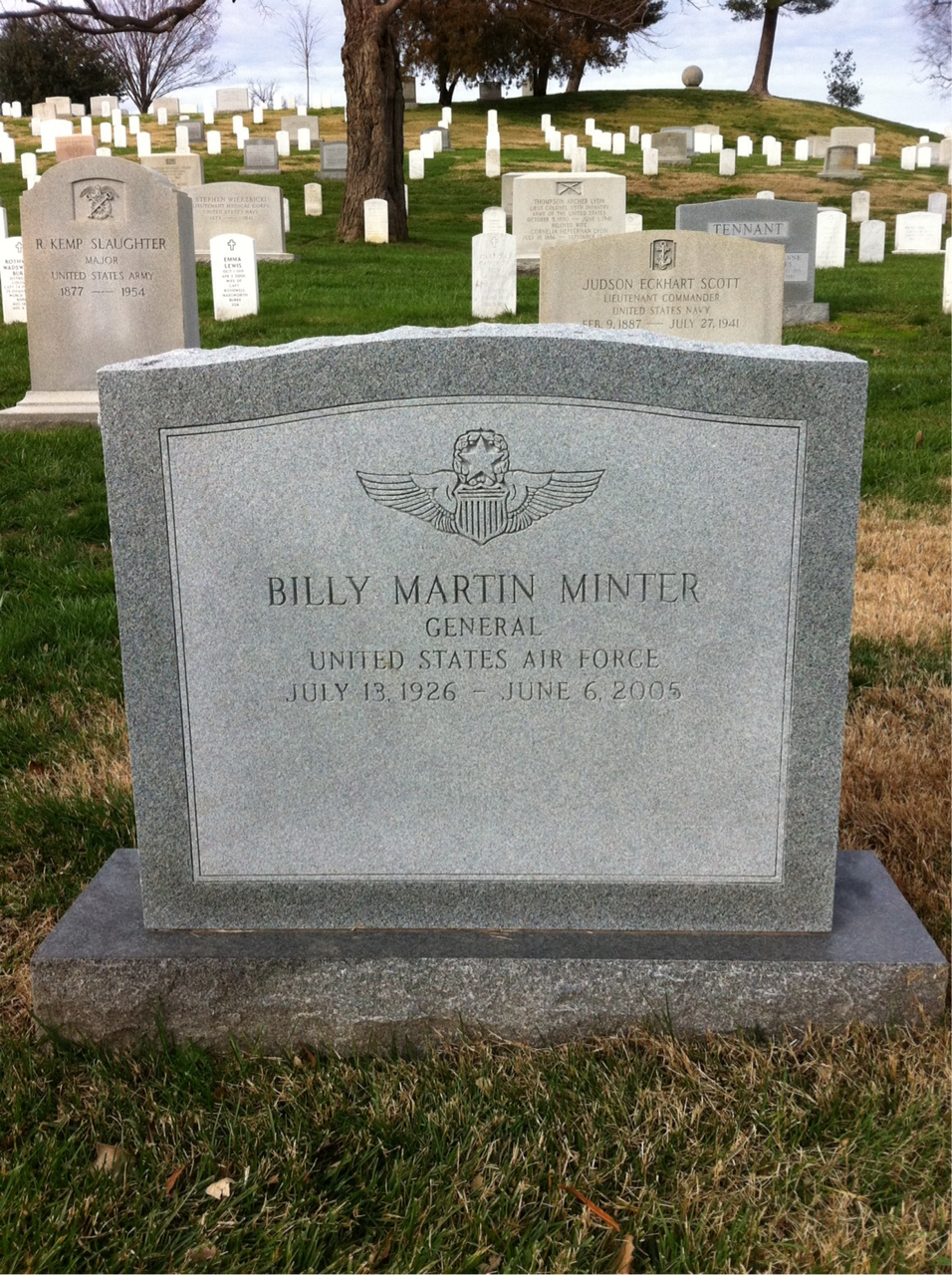
Grave at Arlington National Cemetery

Minter attended the Defense Weapons System Management Course at the Air Force Institute of Technology, Wright-Patterson Air Force Base, Ohio, in January 1971 and in September 1971 was appointed chief of the F-111 Aardvark System Management Division at McClellan. He returned to Wright-Patterson in April 1973 and became the inspector general for the Air Force Logistics Command. In May 1974 Minter was named the deputy director of logistics (J-4), United States European Command, with headquarters at Stuttgart, West Germany and served in that capacity until July 1975. Minter then became deputy chief of staff for logistics at United States Air Forces in Europe headquarters at Ramstein Air Base.

Assigned to Headquarters USAF, Washington D.C., in July 1978, he initially served as assistant deputy chief of staff, logistics and engineering, and in May 1979 he became deputy chief of staff for logistics and engineering. He assumed his command as commander in chief, U.S. Air Forces in Europe, and commander, Allied Air Forces Central Europe in June 1982.

He was promoted to general July 1, 1982. He retired on October 31, 1984, and died on June 6, 2005. He was buried at Arlington National Cemetery, in Arlington, Virginia.

== Awards ==
- Air Force Distinguished Service Medal
- Legion of Merit
- Distinguished Flying Cross
- Bronze Star Medal
- Meritorious Service Medal
- Air Medal with four oak leaf clusters
- Presidential Unit Citation emblem with an oak leaf cluster
- Air Force Outstanding Unit Award Ribbon with two oak leaf clusters
- Command pilot with 5,600 flying hours

== See also ==
- List of commanders of USAFE
