= 507th Air Refueling Wing =

US Air Force reserve unit

507th Air Refueling Wing

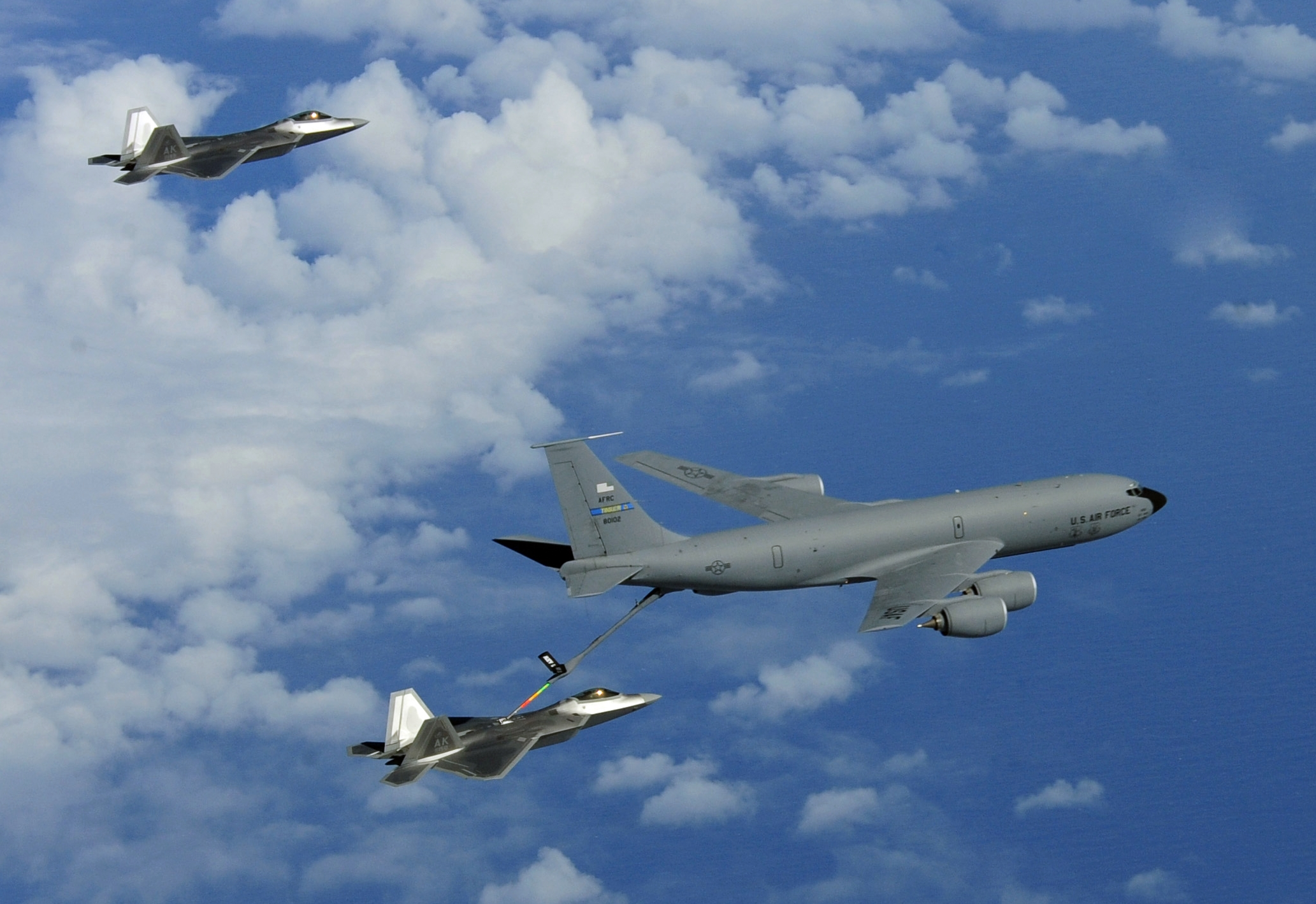
- A 465th ARS KC-135R refuels an F-22A near Guam, 2010
- Active: 1944—1946; 1955–1961; 1961–1968; 1972–1973; 1975–present
- Country: United States
- Branch: United States Air Force
- Type: Wing
- Role: Aerial refueling
- Size: 1100 Personnel
- Part of: Air Force Reserve Command
- Garrison/HQ: Tinker Air Force Base, Oklahoma
- Nickname: SH Okies
- Motto: Defendimus Usque ad Astra (Latin for 'We Defend Even to the Stars')
- Engagements: Pacific Theater of Operations
- Decorations: Distinguished Unit Citation; Air Force Outstanding Unit Award

Commanders
- Current commander: Colonel Thomas Hutton

Insignia
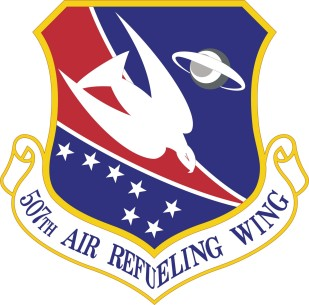
- 507th Air Refueling Wing emblem (Note: Approved 15 February 2007.)
- Tail stripe: Blue tail stripe "Tinker" in yellow
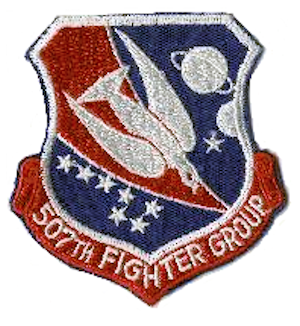
- Patch with 507th Fighter Group Emblem (Note: Approved 17 August 1956.)

Aircraft flown
- Tanker: KC-135 Stratotanker

The 507th Air Refueling Wing is a reserve component flying unit of the United States Air Force. It is assigned to Fourth Air Force of Air Force Reserve Command, stationed at Tinker Air Force Base, Oklahoma with elements at Altus Air Force Base, Oklahoma. The 507th ARW executes air refueling, airlift, and training in support of Air Mobility Command and U.S. Strategic Command's national emergency war order requirements. The wing employs approximately 1,100 men and women made up of a mix of Traditional Reservists, full-time Air Reserve Technicians, AGRs and Air Force civilians. The wing also provides mission support for all other reserve units stationed at Tinker AFB.

The first predecessor of the wing was the 507th Fighter Group, which was activated in 1944 and trained as a long range fighter unit for the Pacific Theater. Although the group was in combat for only two months, it earned a Distinguished Unit Citation three days before the Japanese surrender for destroying a number of enemy interceptor aircraft over Korea. In 1984, this group was consolidated with the 507th Fighter Wing into a single unit.

The group was redesignated the 507th Fighter Group (Air Defense) and activated in August 1955 at Kinross Air Force Base, Michigan, flying Northrop F-89D Scorpions and acted as the host for all active duty Air Force organizations at Kinross. It assumed an air defense mission with the F-89 and later, the Convair F-102 Delta Dagger, and finally the Convair F-106 Delta Dart. It was replaced by the 507th Fighter Wing in 1961 to provide support for the 4239th Strategic Wing (later replaced by the 449th Bombardment Wing) and the 37th Air Defense Missile Squadron. During the Cuban Missile Crisis, the wing dispersed one third of its interceptors to Phelps Collins Field, Michigan and placed all group aircraft on fifteen-minute alert status. Attrition of interceptors (and the fact that production lines closed in 1961) caused a reduction in the number of interceptor units and in September 1968 the 507th Wing was inactivated.

In May 1972 the group was activated in the reserves as the 507th Tactical Fighter Group, flying Republic F-105 Thunderchiefs, and replacing the 937th Military Airlift Group at Tinker. It was the first reserve group to participate in a Red Flag exercise or to deploy to Turkey for its annual tour of active duty. Upgrading to McDonnell F-4 Phantom IIs in 1980 and to General Dynamics F-16 Fighting Falcons in 1988, the group flew fighters until 1994. As the 507th Air Refueling Group, it began the worldwide air refueling mission with the Boeing KC-135R Stratotanker. From 1996 to 1997 it was assigned the 513th Air Control Group flying the Boeing E-3 Sentry AWACS aircraft and from 2008 to 2015 the 137th Air Refueling Wing of the Oklahoma Air National Guard was an associate unit of the wing. The wing participated in Operations Enduring Freedom and Iraqi Freedom and sent forces to assist with the recovery following Hurricane Katrina.

== Overview ==
The 507th Air Refueling Wing supports Air Mobility Command airlift and air refueling requirements and United States Strategic Command's emergency war order requirements. It regularly supports overseas deployments. The 507th employs approximately 1100 men and women. Approximately 200 members of the 507th are either civilian employees or Air Reserve Technicians who serve as a full-time support cadre, while the remainder are traditional reservists.

The wing also provides the full-time technicians and support personnel for the 513th Air Control Group and the 35th Combat Communications Squadron, reserve units stationed at Tinker, but assigned elsewhere.

== Units and Missions ==
The 507th Air Refueling Wing consists of the following units and their components:

- The 507th Operations Group commands three squadrons and one flight:

The 465th Air Refueling Squadron operates eight Boeing KC-135R aircraft. Its reservists, both pilots and boom operators, maintain mission-ready status and regularly deploy in support of contingency operations.

The 507th Operations Support Squadron provides intelligence, aircrew flight equipment, operations and war planning for the wing and maintains aircrew flight records.

The 730th Air Mobility Training Squadron, located at Altus Air Force Base, Oklahoma, trains reservists on the McDonnell Douglas C-17 Globemaster III and Boeing KC-135 Stratotanker in association with the regular 97th Air Mobility Wing of Air Education and Training Command. As the Boeing KC-46 Pegasus enters the inventory, the 730th will also train on that aircraft.

The 1st Aviation Standards Flight operates the Bombardier Challenger 601 and 605 from Will Rogers World Airport and augments the Air Force Flight Standards Agency Detachment 1, the on-site active duty unit. It supports Federal Aviation Administration flight inspection requirements. It inspects and certifies military navigational aids, radar and instrument procedures at military and civilian installations in the United States and overseas and maintains a capability to perform flight inspections in combat theaters.

- The 507th Maintenance Group commands two squadrons.

The 507th Maintenance Squadron performs periodic inspections, fabricates repairs, and maintains engines, air refueling booms, aircraft fuel systems, and aerospace ground equipment.

The 507th Aircraft Maintenance Squadron directs organizational level maintenance and the generation of aircraft.

- The 507th Mission Support Group commands five squadrons

The 72nd Aerial Port Squadron loads, unloads, and processes air freight arriving from and departing to locations worldwide.

The 507th Security Forces Squadron provides air base ground defense and protects weapon systems and support personnel. It trains wing personnel in the use of small arms.

The 507th Civil Engineer Squadron trains and equips teams for worldwide combat support. The squadron's personnel train to perform rapid runway repair, structural bomb damage repair, fire fighting and crash rescue.

The 507th Logistic Readiness Squadron carries out functions pertaining to transportation, supply, contracting, fuels and maintenance training.

The 507th Force Support Squadron provides personnel management and services support including lodging, fitness, food, recreation and mortuary affairs. Additionally, it includes a communications element including telecommunications, radio systems, and small computer support.

- The 507th Medical Squadron monitors the medical, dental and mental health of members of the 507th Wing and 513th Group. It trains them on first aid, CPR, and performs chemical warfare mask testing. It is integrated with the staff at the Tinker Base Hospital and if mobilized is trained to support either a fixed site or mobile field hospital.

== History ==
=== World War II ===
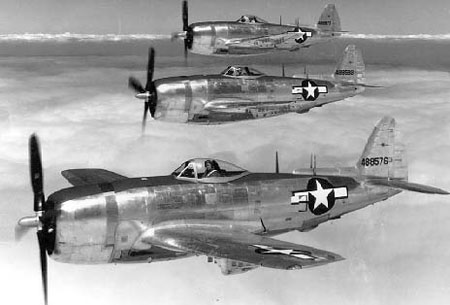
Long range P-47N Thunderbolts

The wing was first activated as the 507th Fighter Group at Peterson Field, Colorado in October 1944 and was equipped with the long range version of the Republic P-47 Thunderbolt. Its original squadrons were the 463d, 464th and 465th Fighter Squadrons. One week later, it moved to Bruning Army Air Field, Nebraska without personnel or equipment to begin equipping and training.

In mid-December 1944, the 507th moved to Dalhart Army Air Field, Texas. There the group's personnel received training in preparation for assignment to the Pacific Theater of Operations. For four months they received combat training for long-range escort, strafing, and dive bombing. In late April the group departed Dalhart for shipment overseas, staging out of Fort Lawton, Washington.

The 507th arrived in the Pacific Theater in June 1945, and was stationed at Ie Shima in the Ryukyu Islands. The group was assigned to the 301st Fighter Wing. On 1 July 1945 it began flying airstrikes from Ie Shima, targeting enemy ships, railroad bridges, airfields, factories, and barracks in Japan, Korea, and China. The group encountered little enemy opposition on these strikes. On 8 August 1945 the group escorted Boeing B-29 Superfortress bombers on a raid on Yawata, Japan, flying its sole mission escorting bombers. For the first time it faced stiff opposition and shot down several Japanese fighters.

The group earned a Distinguished Unit Citation when it engaged and destroyed Japanese interceptor aircraft during a long-range fighter sweep to Korea on 13 August 1945. After the Japanese surrender, the 507th moved to Yontan Airfield, Okinawa in January 1946, and was inactivated there on 27 May 1946.

507th Ftr Gp

Aerial Victories	Call Sign	Fuselage Code	Number	Note
Group Hq			.5
463d Fighter Squadron			24
464th Fighter Squadron			15
465th Fighter Squadron			4.5
Group Total			44

=== Air Defense ===
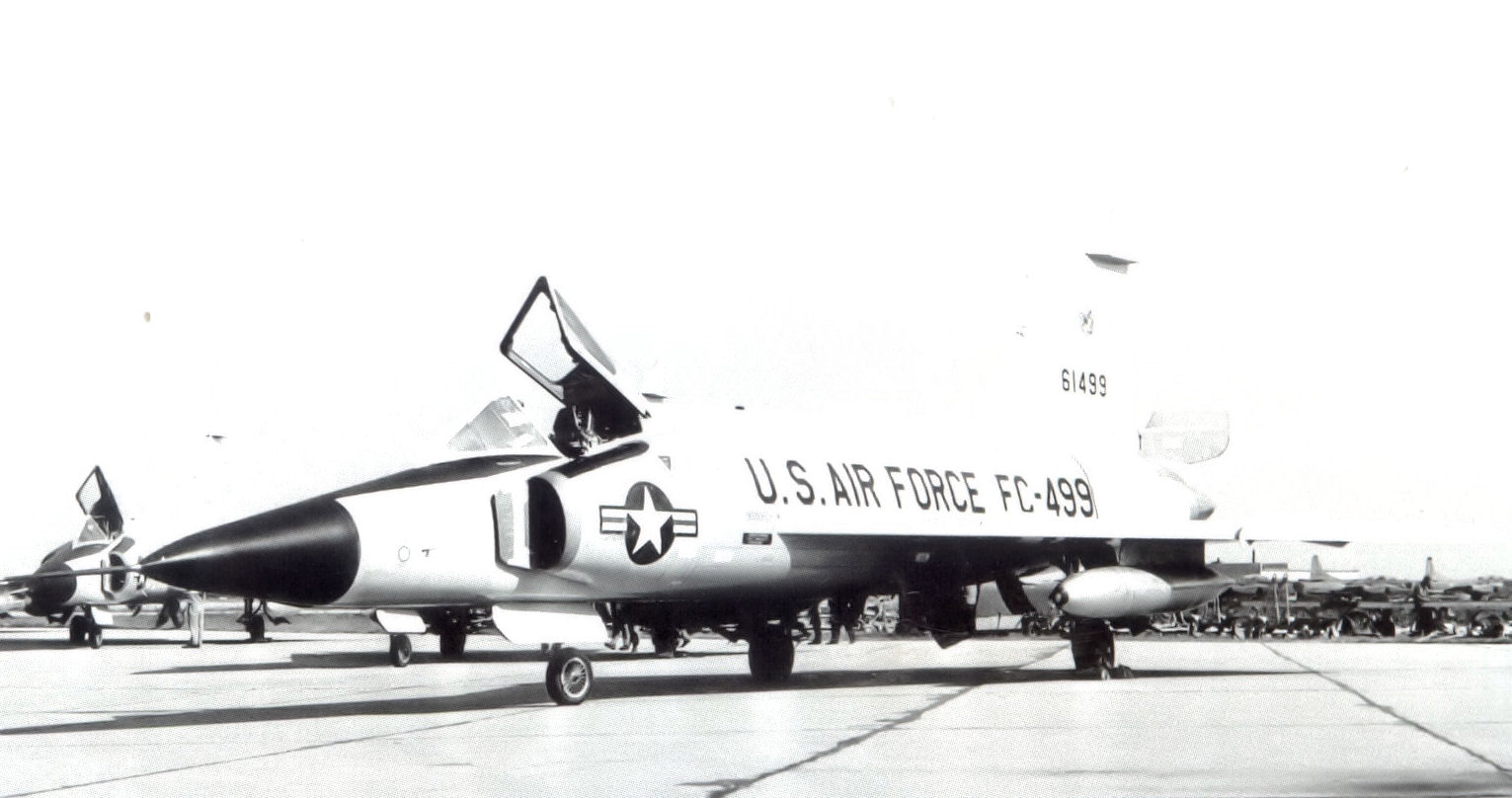
438th Fighter-Interceptor Squadron F-102A (Note: Aircraft is Convair F-102A-80-CO Delta Dagger serial 56-1499. Taken at Kincheloe AFB in July 1958.)

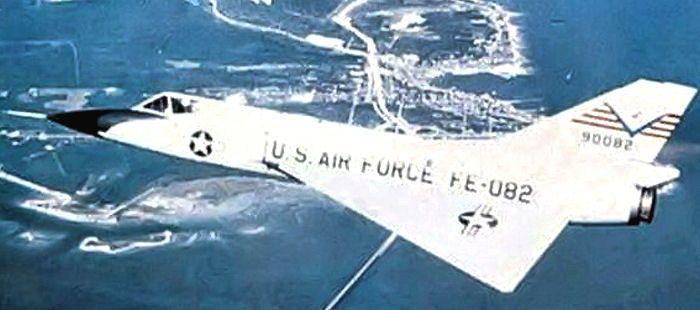
438th Fighter-Interceptor Squadron F-106 (Note: Aircraft is Convair F-106A Delta Dart serial 59–82.)

The group was redesignated the 507th Fighter Group (Air Defense) and activated in August 1955 at Kinross Air Force Base, Michigan where it replaced the 534th Air Defense Group and assumed the 534th's mission, personnel and equipment as part of Air Defense Command (ADC)'s Project Arrow. Project Arrow was designed to bring back on the active list the fighter units which had compiled memorable records in the two world wars. The 438th Fighter-Interceptor Squadron, flying radar equipped Northrop F-89D Scorpions armed with Mighty Mouse rockets, was transferred from the 534th. The 507th was assigned several support organizations to fulfill its additional role as the host for all active duty Air Force organizations at Kinross.

The 507th Group assumed the air defense mission, training with interceptor aircraft and participating in various exercises. The group (and later the 507th Wing) would continue this mission until September 1968. In April 1957, the group upgraded to supersonic Convair F-102 Delta Daggers, which could carry the GAR-1 (later AIM-4 Falcon) and were equipped with data link for interception control through the Semi-Automatic Ground Environment system.

In July 1959, Strategic Air Command (SAC) organized the 4239th Strategic Wing as the first major tenant organization at Kinross, although the wing remained a headquarters only with no tactical squadrons assigned until 1961. In September 1959, Kinross was renamed Kincheloe Air Force Base in honor of Captain Iven Kincheloe.

March 1960 saw another addition to Kincheloe's mission, when ADC activated the 37th Air Defense Missile Squadron, equipped with IM-99 Bomarc missiles. In June, the group completed another upgrade, this time to the Convair F-106 Delta Dart, which it would fly until inactivating in 1968.

In view of the expanded mission at Kincheloe and the pending growth of the SAC mission once Boeing B-52H Stratofortresses were available, it became apparent that a group was too small to operate the base while performing the air defense mission. In April 1961 the 507th Fighter Wing replaced the 507th Group and assumed its assets, while adding additional support units, which were assigned to the wing's 507th Air Base Group (later the 507th Combat Support Group). In February 1962, ADC increased the alert requirement for its units. In addition to the two aircraft the wing had been maintaining on five-minute alert, one third of the unit's aircraft were placed on fifteen-minute alert.

On 22 October 1962, at the beginning of the Cuban Missile Crisis, when President Kennedy announced the presence of Soviet intermediate-range ballistic missiles in Cuba. Continental Air Defense Command (CONAD) directed the dispersal of interceptors within the United States. The wing sent one third of its aircraft to Phelps Collins Field, Michigan. (Note: This was not the planned dispersal base for the 507th, Volk Field, Wisconsin was. ADC had not completed its dispersal plan and several units, including the 507th, dispersed to "interim" bases. McMullen, pp. 11–12.) All group aircraft, including those at home and those at Phelps Collins were armed and placed on fifteen-minute alert status. The increased alert posture was maintained through mid-November, when CONAD returned units to their normal alert status, except for those under the control of its 32d Region, which controlled air defense in the Southeastern United States.

The 4239th Strategic Wing was replaced in February 1963 by the 449th Bombardment Wing. Attrition (and the fact that production lines closed in 1961) caused a gradual drop in the number of planes assigned to interceptor squadrons, from 24 to typically 18 by 1964. The force reduction continued, finally resulting in a reduction in the number of interceptor units. In September 1968 the 507th Wing was inactivated along with the 438th Fighter-Interceptor Squadron, while its 507th Combat Support Group was replaced by the 4609th Air Base Group.

=== Air Force Reserve ===
==== Tactical Fighter ====
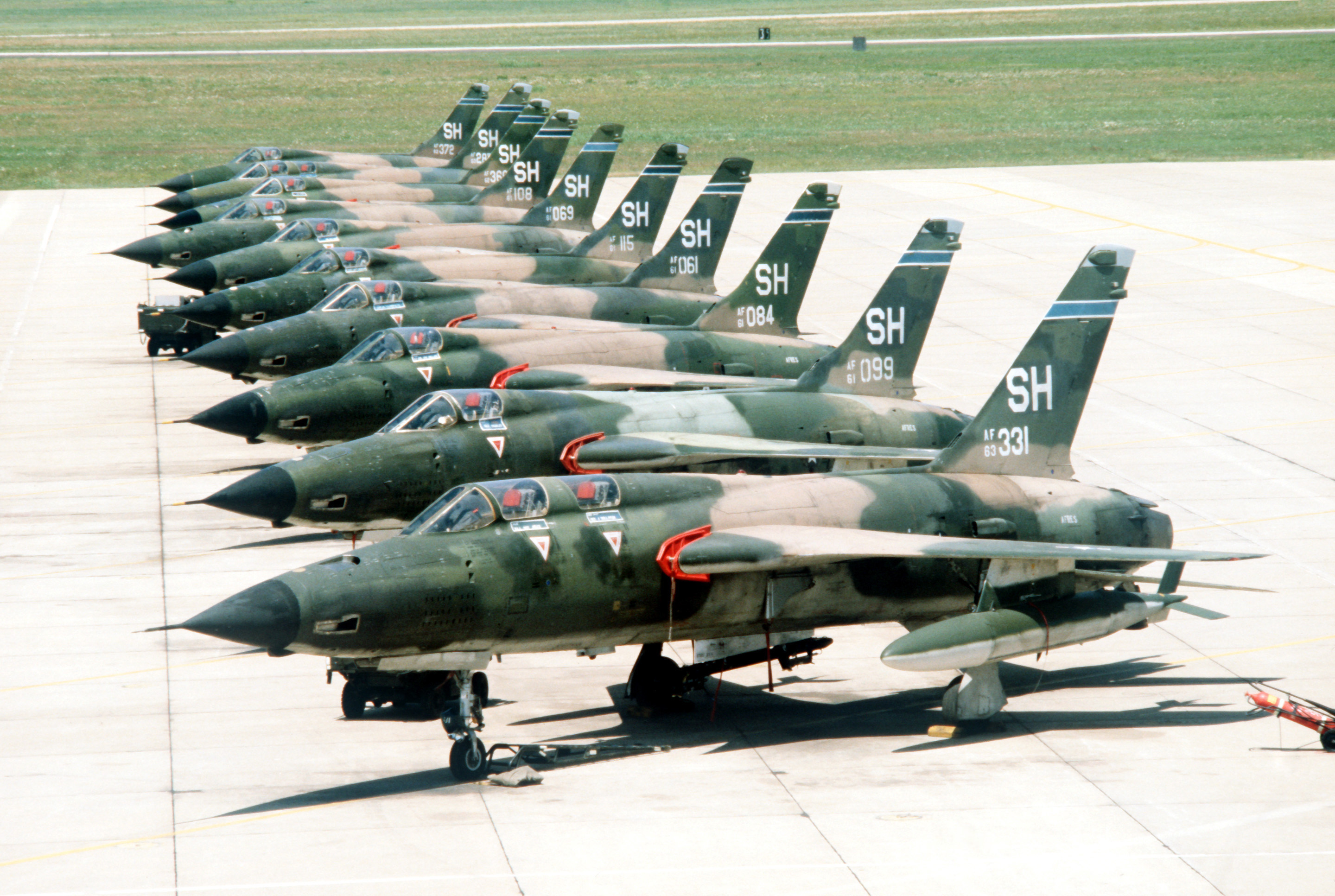
F-105s of the 465th Tactical Fighter Squadron

In 1972 the Air Force Reserve began to receive Republic F-105 Thunderchiefs, which were becoming surplus to Air Force needs in Southeast Asia. To operate these fighters, it formed three tactical fighter groups, the first of which was the 507th Tactical Fighter Group at Tinker Air Force Base, Oklahoma, which was activated in May. Tinker was selected because the 937th Military Airlift Group there was slated to lose its Douglas C-124 Globemaster IIs, which were being removed from the inventory. The transition to the Thunderchief was the most difficult the Reserve had faced. In addition to the huge change from four reciprocating engine transports to supersonic jet fighters, declassification of the conversion only occurred in March, providing less than two months for open actions to implement the transition. Although the first F-105 arrived at Tinker on 14 April, the reservists were not prepared to accept the aircraft, and a special team from Tactical Air Command arrived to inspect the aircraft and place them in temporary storage until aircrew and maintenance personnel could be trained on the fighter.

The following spring the Reserve reassigned its tactical fighter squadrons directly to the 301st Tactical Fighter Wing. (Note: During the period the group was inactive, its place was taken by Detachment 507, 301st Fighter Wing. "Abstract, History 301st Tactical Fighter Wing Aug–Dec 1975". Air Force History Index..) After two years the group was once again activated. It trained for tactical fighter missions, participating in numerous tactical, joint, and combined exercises until September 1994.

In 1978, the 507th became the first Air Force Reserve group to participate in a Red Flag exercise], and two years later it was the first to deploy to Turkey for its annual tour of active duty. In 1980, the group traded in its Thunderchiefs for McDonnell F-4 Phantom IIs. The Phantoms were replaced in turn by General Dynamics F-16 Fighting Falcons in 1988. During Desert Storm the group deployed aircraft and personnel to the combat theater, but did not participate as a unit.

==== Air Refueling ====
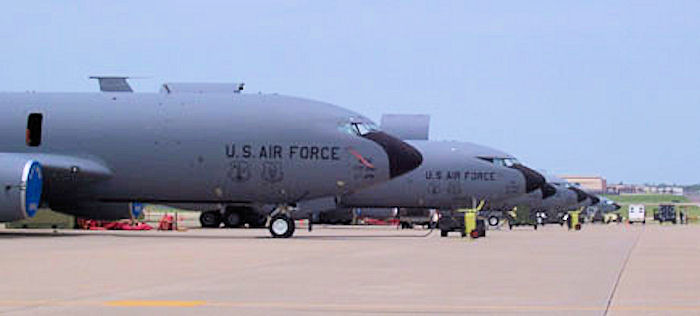
Wing aircraft on the parking apron at Tinker AFB

It converted in 1994 from flying fighters to conducting worldwide air refueling operations with the KC-135R. Six months later, the 507th Group, which had been combined with 507th Wing as a single unit in 1984, became a wing again for the first time since 1968. The Oklahoma City Air Logistics Complex, the Air Force's primary C-135 engine maintenance facility is also located at Tinker. As a result, the 507th routinely supports requests involving modification projects designed to produce upgrades to the Air Force's tanker fleet.

Starting in 1995, the wing assisted with the organization of the 513th Air Control Group, the only Reserve organization flying the Boeing E-3 Sentry AWACS aircraft, The 513th was activated in March 1996 as a reserve associate unit of the 552d Air Control Wing. In April 1997, the 513th was reassigned to Tenth Air Force. However, the 507th continues to provide support personnel for the 513th. In March 1999, the 931st Air Refueling Group, an associate of the active duty 22d Air Refueling Wing at McConnell Air Force Base, Kansas was assigned to the wing as the group's administrative headquarters

As a result of the 2005 Base Realignment and Closure Commission recommendations, the 137th Airlift Wing of the Oklahoma Air National Guard moved from Will Rogers Air National Guard Base to Tinker and became an associate unit of the 507th Air Refueling Wing, redesignating as the 137th Air Refueling Wing and operating the same aircraft. The number of aircraft operated by the 507th and 137th was simultaneously increased by the transfer of KC-135s from the 939th Air Refueling Wing. The affiliation continued until July 2015, when the 137th began to convert to the Beechcraft MC-12W Liberty. In conjunction with this transition the 137th is returning to Will Rogers, where it will become the 137th Special Operations Wing and terminate its affiliation with the 507th.

The wing participated in Operation Enduring Freedom, the Global War on Terrorism, and in Operation Iraqi Freedom. In 2005, it sent forces to assist with the recovery following Hurricane Katrina.

== Lineage ==
507th Air Refueling Wing

- Established as the 507th Fighter Group, Single Engine on 5 October 1944

Activated on 12 October 1944
Inactivated on 27 May 1946

- Redesignated 507th Fighter Group (Air Defense) on 20 June 1955

Activated on 18 August 1955
Discontinued and inactivated on 1 February 1961

- Redesignated 507th Tactical Fighter Group on 4 May 1972

Activated in the Reserve on 20 May 1972
Inactivated on 25 March 1973

- Activated in the Reserve on 17 October 1975
- Consolidated with the 507th Fighter Wing on 31 January 1984

Redesignated 507th Fighter Group on 1 February 1992
Redesignated 507th Air Refueling Group on 1 April 1994
Redesignated 507th Air Refueling Wing on 1 October 1994
Redesignated 507th Wing on 15 March 1996
Redesignated 507th Air Refueling Wing on 1 August 1997

507th Fighter Wing

- Established and activated on 28 December 1960 (not organized)

Organized on 1 February 1961
Inactivated on 30 September 1968

- Consolidated with the 507th Tactical Fighter Group as the 507th Tactical Fighter Group on 31 January 1984

=== Assignments ===
- 72d Fighter Wing, 12 October 1944
- 301st Fighter Wing, 24 June 1945 – 27 May 1946
- 4706th Air Defense Wing, 18 August 1955
- 37th Air Division, 8 July 1956
- 30th Air Division, 1 April 1959
- Sault Sainte Marie Air Defense Sector, 1 April 1960 – 1 February 1961; 1 February 1961
- Duluth Air Defense Sector, 1 October 1963
- 29th Air Division, 1 April 1966 – 30 September 1968
- 442d Tactical Airlift Wing, 20 May 1972
- 301st Tactical Fighter Wing, 25 July 1972 – 25 March 1973
- 301st Tactical Fighter Wing, 17 October 1975
- 419th Tactical Fighter Wing (later 419 Fighter Wing), 1 October 1982
- 452d Air Refueling Wing, 1 April 1994
- Fourth Air Force, 15 April 1994 – present

=== Components ===
Groups

- 507th Operations Group: 1 August 1992 – present
- 507th Logistics Group (later 507th Maintenance Group): 1 August 1992 – present
- 507th Air Base Group (later 507th Combat Support Group, 507th Support Group, 507th Mission Support Group): 1 April 1962 – 30 September 1968, 1 August 1992 – present
- 513th Air Control Group: 15 March 1996 – 1 April 1997
- 931st Air Refueling Group: 1 March 1999 – present

McConnell Air Force Base, Kansas

Squadrons

- 438th Fighter-Interceptor Squadron: 18 August 1955 – 1 February 1961, 1 February 1961 – 30 September 1968
- 463d Fighter Squadron: 12 October 1944 – 27 May 1946
- 464th Fighter Squadron: 12 October 1944 – 27 May 1946
- 465th Fighter Squadron (later 465th Tactical Fighter Squadron, 465th Fighter Squadron): 12 October 1944 – 24 May 1946; 20 May 1972 – 25 March 1973; 17 October 1975 – 1 August 1992

=== Stations ===
- Peterson Field, Colorado, 12 October 1944
- Bruning Army Air Field, Nebraska, 20 October 1944
- Dalhart Army Air Field, Texas, 15 December 1944 – 24 April 1945
- Ie Shima Airfield, Ryuku Islands, 24 June 1945
- Yontan Airfield, Okinawa, 19 January 1946 – 27 May 1946
- Kinross Air Force Base (later Kincheloe Air Force Base), Michigan 18 August 1955 – 1 February 1961, 1 February 1961 – 30 September 1968
- Tinker Air Force Base, Oklahoma, 20 May 1972 – 25 March 1973
- Tinker Air Force Base, Oklahoma, 17 October 1975 – present

=== Aircraft ===
- Republic P-47 Thunderbolt (1944–1946)
- Northrop F-89 Scorpion (1955–1957)
- Convair F-102 Delta Dagger (1957–1960)
- Convair F-106 Delta Dart (1960–1968)
- Republic F-105 Thunderchief (1972–1973, 1975–1980)
- McDonnell F-4 Phantom II (1980–1988)
- General Dynamics F-16 Fighting Falcon (1988–1994)
- Boeing KC-135 Stratotanker (1994 – present)
- Boeing E-3 Sentry (1996–1997)
- Bombardier Challenger 601 and 605

=== Awards and campaigns ===
Award streamer	Award	Dates	Notes
	Distinguished Unit Citation	13 August 1945 Korea	507th Fighter Group
	Air Force Outstanding Unit Award	1 June 1966-1 June 1968	507th Fighter Wing
	Air Force Outstanding Unit Award	1 January 1978-31 December 1978	507th Tactical Fighter Group
	Air Force Outstanding Unit Award	11 July 1985-1 July 1986	507th Tactical Fighter Group
	Air Force Outstanding Unit Award	1 July 1987-31 August 1989	507th Tactical Fighter Group
	Air Force Outstanding Unit Award	1 January 1992-31 December 1993	507th Tactical Fighter Group (later 507th Fighter Group)
	Air Force Outstanding Unit Award	1 January 1994-31 December 1995	507th Fighter Group (later 507th Air Refueling Group, 507th Air Refueling Wing)
	Air Force Outstanding Unit Award	1 August 1996-31 July 1998	507th Air Refueling Wing
	Air Force Outstanding Unit Award	1 January 2009-1 August 2010	507th Air Refueling Wing

Campaign Streamer	Campaign	Dates	Notes
	Air Offensive, Japan	24 June 1945 – 2 September 1945	507th Fighter Group
	Western Pacific	24 June 1945 – 2 September 1945	507th Fighter Group
	Ryukus	24 June 1945 – 2 July 1945	507th Fighter Group
	China Offensive	24 June 1945 – 2 September 1945	507th Fighter Group

== See also ==
- F-89 Scorpion units of the United States Air Force
- List of F-106 Delta Dart units of the United States Air Force
- List of F-4 Phantom II operators
- General Dynamics F-16 Fighting Falcon operators
