= Felix Moncla =

United States Air Force officer

Felix Eugene Moncla Jr.
- Born: October 21, 1926; Mansura, Louisiana, U.S.
- Died: presumably November 23, 1953 (aged 27); Lake Superior
- Military career
- Allegiance: United States of America
- Branch: United States Army; United States Air Force
- Service years: 1945-1946 U.S. Army; 1950-1953 U.S. Air Force
- Rank: First Lieutenant
- Nickname: Gene

First Lieutenant Felix Eugene Moncla Jr. (October 21, 1926 – presumed dead November 23, 1953) was a United States Air Force (USAF) pilot who disappeared while performing an air defense intercept over Lake Superior in 1953. His disappearance is sometimes known as the Kinross Incident, after Kinross Air Force Base, where Moncla was on temporary assignment at the time he vanished.

The USAF reported that Moncla had crashed into Lake Superior while tracking a Royal Canadian Air Force (RCAF) C-47 aircraft which was off course. According to the report, the pilot of the Canadian aircraft did not know that he was the subject of an interception.

== Biography ==
Felix Moncla was born in Mansura, Louisiana, on October 21, 1926, to Felix Sr. (1894–1957), a high school science teacher, principal and veteran of World War I, and Yvonne Beridon Moncla (1900–1961), a seamstress. He also had two older sisters, Leonie and Muriel Ann. Not long after his father had been hospitalized, Moncla's family moved to Moreauville, Louisiana, to live with his uncle and great aunt.

Moncla attended high school in Moreauville and, upon graduating from high school, accepted an athletic scholarship to Southwest Louisiana Institute, where he played football and received his Bachelor of Science degree. After graduation, he enlisted in the United States Army and served during World War II as part of the occupation force of Japan. After his service, Moncla attended the University of New Orleans, but reenlisted in the military at the start of the Korean War in 1950, this time joining the United States Air Force (USAF) as an officer pilot trainee.

After spending a few months at a desk job in Dallas, Texas, Moncla was sent to Connally Air Force Base in Waco for basic pilot training, where he met and married Bobbie Jean Coleman. He took his advanced pilot training at Reese Air Force Base in Lubbock, and further training on the F-89 Scorpion at Tyndall Air Force Base in Panama City, Florida. In Panama City, Bobbie Jean gave birth to their first son. In July 1952, Moncla and his family moved to Madison, Wisconsin, and had a daughter born five months before Moncla's disappearance.

== Disappearance ==
Location of the now defunct Kincheloe Air Force Base, Michigan

On the evening of November 23, 1953, Air Defense Command Ground Intercept radar operators at Sault Ste. Marie, Michigan, identified an unusual target over Lake Superior, near the Soo Locks. An F-89C Scorpion jet from Kinross Air Force Base was scrambled to investigate the radar return; the Scorpion was piloted by First Lieutenant Moncla, with Second Lieutenant Robert L. Wilson acting as the Scorpion's radar operator.

Wilson had a difficult time tracking the object on the Scorpion's radar, so ground radar operators gave Moncla directions towards the object as he flew. Moncla eventually closed in on the object at about 8,000 feet in altitude. Ground Control tracked the Scorpion and the unidentified object as two "blips" on the radar screen. The two blips on the radar screen grew closer and closer until they seemed to merge. Assuming that Moncla had flown either under or over the target, Ground Control anticipated that moments later, the Scorpion and the object would again appear as two separate blips. There was a fear that the two objects had struck one another, but the single blip continued on its previous course. Attempts were made to contact Moncla via radio, but without success. A search and rescue operation by both the USAF and the Royal Canadian Air Force (RCAF) was quickly mounted, but failed to find any trace of the plane or its pilots. Weather conditions were a factor in hampering the search.

== USAF Accident Investigation Report ==
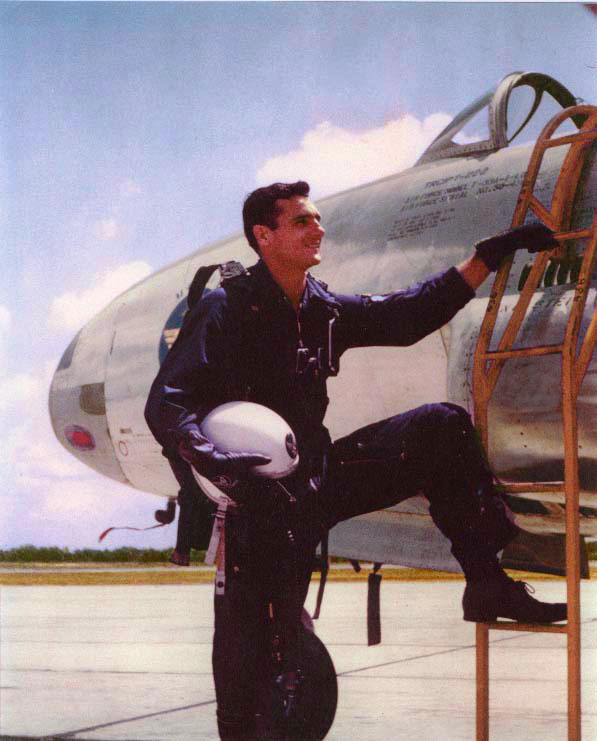
Lt. Gene Moncla by T-33 at Truax Field in Madison, Wisconsin

The official USAF Accident Investigation Report states the F-89 was sent to investigate an RCAF C-47 Skytrain which was travelling off course. The F-89 was flying at an elevation of 8,000 feet when it merged with the other aircraft, as was expected in an interception. Its IFF signal also disappeared after the two returns merged on the radar scope. Although efforts to contact the crew on radio were unsuccessful, the pilot of another F-89 sent on the search stated in testimony to the accident board that he believed that he had heard a brief radio transmission from the pilot about forty minutes after the plane disappeared.

USAF investigators reported that Moncla may have experienced vertigo and crashed into Lake Superior. The USAF said that Moncla had been known to experience vertigo from time to time: "Additional leads uncovered during this later course of the investigation indicated that there might be a possibility that Lt. Moncla was subject to attacks of vertigo a little more than the normal degree. Upon pursuing these leads, it was discovered that statements had been made by former members of Lt. Moncla's organization but were not first hand evidence and were regarded as hearsay." Pilot vertigo is not listed as a cause or possible cause in any of the USAF Accident Investigation Board's findings and conclusions.

The official accident report states that when the unknown return was first picked up on radar, it was believed to be RCAF aircraft "VC-912" but it was classified as "UNKNOWN" because it was off its flight plan course by about thirty miles. This assertion was emphatically denied by the pilot of this RCAF flight, Gerald Fosberg, when he was interviewed for the David Cherniack documentary "The Moncla Memories" produced for VisionTV's Enigma series.

According to UFO writer Donald Keyhoe in his 1955 book, The Flying Saucer Conspiracy, he received a telephone call telling him of "a rumor out at Selfridge Field that an F-89 from Kinross [sic] was hit by a flying saucer", but a follow-up call to Public Information Officer Lt. Robert C. White revealed that "the unknown in that case was a Canadian DC-3. It was over the locks by mistake". The "locks" refers to the restricted air space over the Soo Locks at Sault Ste. Marie, on the U.S.–Canada border at the southeast end of Lake Superior.

== Reports of parts found in 1968 ==
Gene Moncla memorial in Sacred Heart Cemetery, Moreauville, Louisiana

It is possible that aircraft parts found near the eastern shore of Lake Superior in late October 1968 were from the missing F-89. A USAF officer confirmed the parts were from a military jet aircraft and news reports speculated these might be from Moncla's F-89. The identity of the parts was never published and the Canadian government states they have no record of the find.

== 2006 "Great Lakes Dive Company" hoax ==
According to a story circulated among UFO buffs on the Internet in 2006, a group of Michigan divers calling themselves the "Great Lakes Dive Company" discovered Moncla's F-89 at the bottom of Lake Superior in the approximate location where the jet had disappeared from radar. This was later debunked as fraud after questioning the legitimacy of the company. The website and names of the Great Lakes Dive Company were never heard from again.

== See also ==
- Disappearance of Frederick Valentich, a similar case
- List of missing aircraft
- List of people who disappeared
- List of UFO sightings
