= Michigan World War II Army Airfields =

Michigan World War II Army Airfields

Site information
- Type: Army Airfields
- Controlled by: United States Army

Site history
- Built: 1940–1944; 82 years ago
- In use: 1940–present

During World War II, the United States Army Air Forces (USAAF) established numerous airfields in Michigan for training pilots and aircrews of USAAF fighters and bombers.

Most of these airfields were under the command of First Air Force or the Army Air Forces Training Command (AAFTC) (a predecessor of the current-day United States Air Force Air Education and Training Command). Other USAAF support commands (Air Technical Service Command (ATSC); Air Transport Command (ATC) or Troop Carrier Command) commanded a significant number of airfields in support roles.

Remnants of these wartime airfields exist. Many were converted into municipal airports, some were returned to agriculture, and several were retained as United States Air Force installations and were front-line bases during the Cold War. Hundreds of the temporary buildings that were used survive today, and are being used for other purposes.

== Major airfields ==
Air Technical Service Command

- Alpena AAF, Alpena

100th Base Headquarters and Air Base Squadron
Now: Alpena County Regional Airport (IATA: APN, ICAO: KAPN)

- Kinross AAF, Kinross

Sub-base of Alpena AAF, Phelps Collins CTRC
Was: Kinross Air Force Base (1947-1959)
Was: Kincheloe Air Force Base (1959-1977)
Now: Chippewa County International Airport
(IATA: CIU, ICAO: KCIU)

- Raco AAF, Raco

Sub-base of Alpena AAF
Was: Used by Michigan National Guard and by
Kincheloe AFB as a BOMARC missile site. Closed 1972.
Now: Non-aviation use
Old runways used for automotive testing.

- Grayling AAF, Grayling

still active United States Army airfield (did not xfer to USAF), part of Camp Grayling

- Tri-City AAF, Saginaw

Now: MBS International Airport (IATA: MBS, ICAO: KMBS)

Troop Carrier Command

- Kellogg AAF, Battle Creek

Troop Carrier Training
321st Base Headquarters and Air Base Squadron
Now: W. K. Kellogg Airport / Battle Creek Air National Guard Base (IATA: BTL, ICAO: KBTL)

First Air Force

- Selfridge AAF, Mt. Clemens

4th Base Headquarters and Air Base Squadron
Was Selfridge Air Force Base (1947-1971)
Now: Selfridge Air National Guard Base (1971-present)

- Oscoda AAF, Oscoda

524th Base Headquarters and Air Base Squadron (reduced)
Sub-base of Selfridge AAF
Was: Oscoda Air Force Base (1947-1953)
Was: Wurtsmith Air Force Base (1953-1993)
Now: Oscoda-Wurtsmith Airport (IATA: OSC, ICAO: KOSC)

Army Air Force Training Command

- Willow Run Airport, Ypsilanti, Michigan

Eastern Technical Training Command
484th Base Headquarters and Air Base Squadron
Now: Public Airport (IATA: YIP, ICAO: KYIP)
Also home of the Yankee Air Museum

Air Transport Command

- Romulus AAF, Detroit

3d Ferrying Group
345th Base Headquarters and Air Base Squadron
Joint Use USAAF/Civil Airport
Now: Detroit Metropolitan Wayne County Airport
(IATA: DTW, ICAO: KDTW)

== See also ==
- Naval Air Station Grosse Ile
