= 534th Air Defense Group =

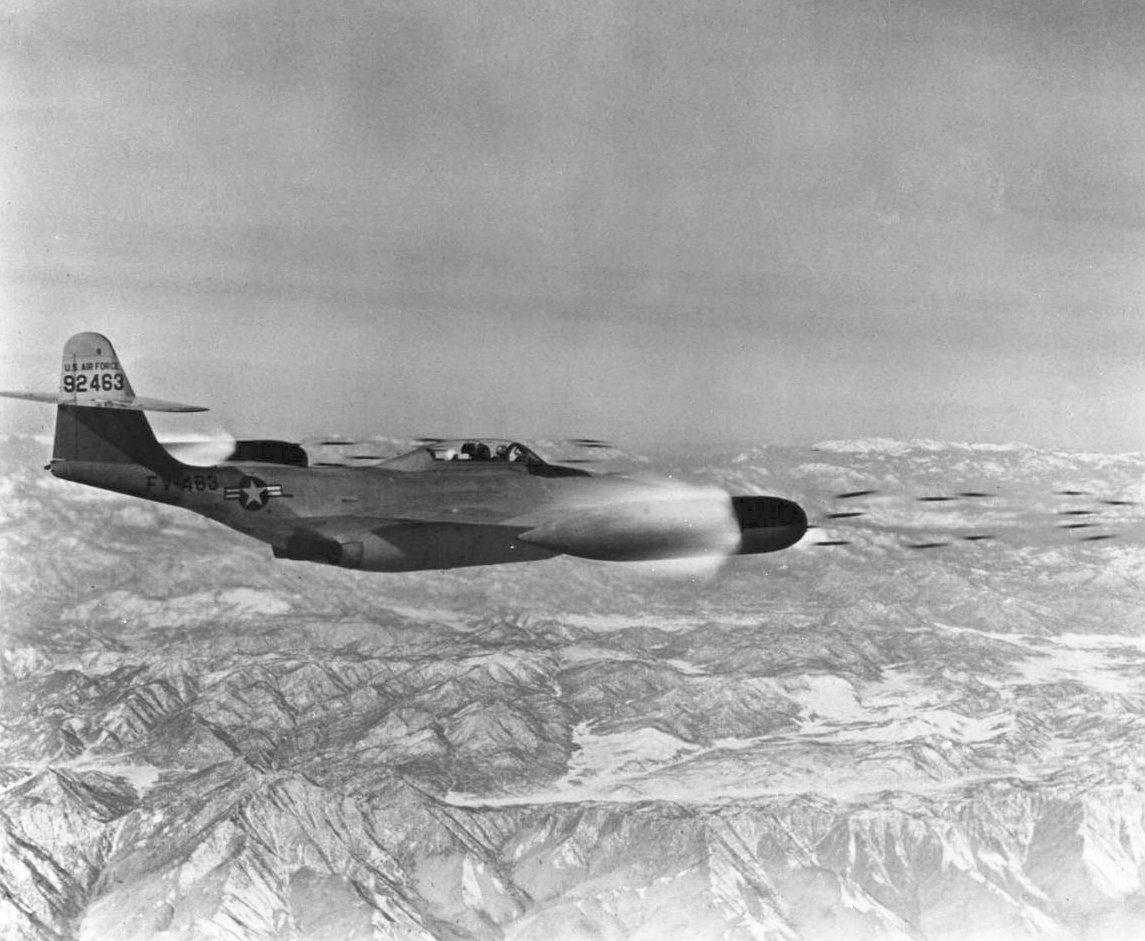
- F-89D Scorpion firing its rockets (Note: Aircraft is Northrop F-89-NO Scorpion, serial 49-2643. It was constructed as an F-89B, then modified as an F-89D. It crashed at Edwards AFB on 20 October 1953. Baugher, Joe (7 April 2023). "1949 USAF Serial Numbers". Joe Baugher.)
- Active: 1945; 1953–1955
- Country: United States
- Branch: United States Air Force
- Type: Fighter interceptor
- Role: Air defense

The 534th Air Defense Group is a disbanded United States Air Force organization. Its last assignment was with the 4706th Air Defense Wing at Kinross Air Force Base, Michigan where it was inactivated in 1955. The group was originally activated as the 534th Air Service Group, a support unit for a combat group at the end of World War II in Italy and then redeployed to the United States where it was inactivated in 1945.

The group was activated once again in 1953, when Air Defense Command (ADC) established it as the headquarters for a dispersed fighter-interceptor squadron and the medical, aircraft maintenance, and administrative squadrons supporting it. It was replaced in 1955 when ADC transferred its mission, equipment, and personnel to the 507th Fighter Group in a project that replaced air defense groups commanding fighter squadrons with fighter groups with distinguished records during World War II.

== History ==
=== World War II ===
The group was activated as the 534th Air Service Group shortly after VE Day in a reorganization of Army Air Forces (AAF) support groups in which the AAF replaced service groups that included personnel from other branches of the Army and supported two combat groups with air service groups including only Air Corps units. It was designed to support a single combat group. Its 960th Air Engineering Squadron provided maintenance that was beyond the capability of the combat group, its 784th Air Materiel Squadron handled all supply matters, and its Headquarters & Base Services Squadron provided other support. The group provided support for one combat group in the Mediterranean Theater of Operations. It returned to the United States for inactivation. It was disbanded in 1948.

=== Cold War ===
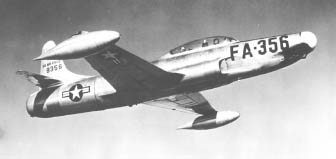
Lockheed F-94B Starfire (Note: Aircraft is Lockheed F-94B-5-LO, serial 51-5356. It crashed in 1953. Baugher, Joe (7 April 2023). "1951 USAF Serial Numbers". Joe Baugher.)

During the Cold War, the group was reconstituted and redesignated as the 534th Air Defense Group, and activated at Kinross Air Force Base in 1953 with responsibility for air defense of the North Central United States, but without an operational squadron until April, when the 438th Fighter-Interceptor Squadron (FIS), flying Lockheed F-94B Starfires armed with 20 mm cannon. was activated. The 438th FIS upgraded to Mighty Mouse rocket armed Northrop F-89D Scorpions in December 1953. The group replaced the 91st Air Base Squadron as USAF host base unit at Kinross. Assigned three squadrons to perform its support responsibilities. The 534th was inactivated and replaced by 507th Fighter Group (Air Defense), in 1955 as result of Air Defense Command's Project Arrow, which was designed to bring back on the active list the fighter units which had compiled memorable records in the two world wars. The 534th was disbanded once again in 1984.

== Lineage ==
- Activated as 534th Air Service Group on 21 May 1945

Inactivated on 17 October 1945
Disbanded on 8 October 1948

- Reconstituted and redesignated 534th Air Defense Group on 21 January 1953

Activated on 16 February 1953
Inactivated on 18 August 1955
Disbanded on 27 September 1984

=== Assignments ===
- Unknown, 21 May 1945 – 17 October 1945 (Probably Air Service Command, Mediterranean Theater of Operations)
- 4706th Defense Wing (later 4706th Air Defense Wing), 16 February 1953 – 18 August 1955

=== Stations ===
- Italy, 21 May 1945 – 1945
- Pyote Army Air Field, Texas, 1945 – 17 October 1945
- Kinross Air Force Base, Michigan, 16 February 1953 – 18 August 1955

=== Components ===
Operational Squadron

- 438th Fighter-Interceptor Squadron, 27 April 1953 – 18 August 1955

Support Units

- 534th Air Base Squadron, 16 February 1953 – 18 August 1955
- 534th Materiel Squadron, 16 February 1953 – 18 August 1955
- 534th Medical Squadron (later 534th USAF Infirmary), 16 February 1953 – 18 August 1955
- 784th Air Materiel Squadron, 21 May 1945 – 17 October 1945
- 960th Air Engineering Squadron, 21 May 1945 – 17 October 1945

=== Aircraft ===
- Northrop F-89D Scorpion, 1953-1955
- Lockheed F-94B Starfighter, 1953

== See also ==
- Aerospace Defense Command Fighter Squadrons
- F-89 Scorpion units of the United States Air Force
- F-94 Starfire units of the United States Air Force
