= Raco Army Airfield =

American military airfield

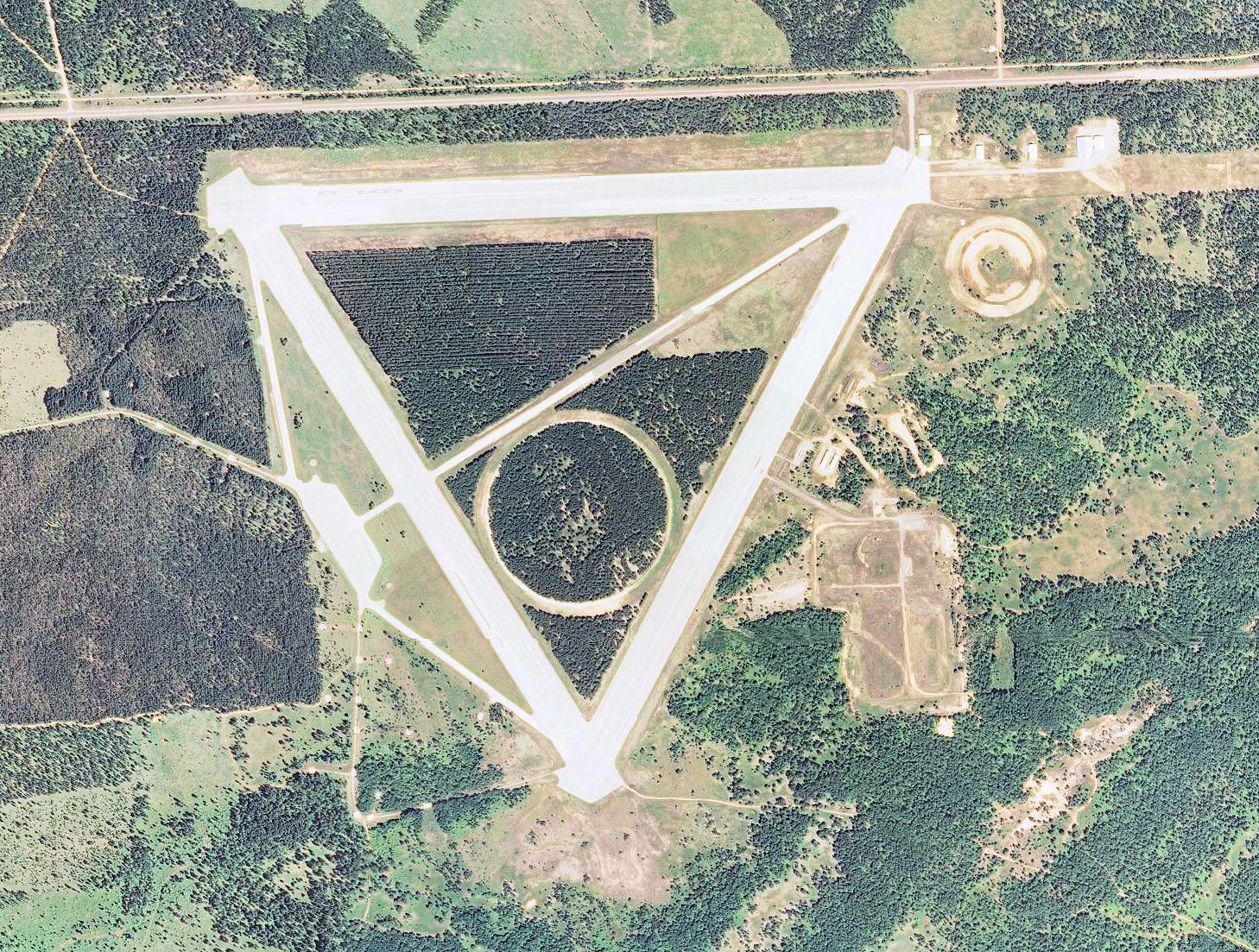
- USGS photo of Raco Army Airfield

Site information
- Type: Military airfield; anti-aircraft battery; missile site
- Controlled by: U.S Forest Service - Hiawatha National Forest

Location
- Coordinates: 46°21′11″N 084°48′54″W

Site history
- Built: 1940
- In use: 1943-1972

Garrison information
- Garrison: 37th Air Defense Missile Squadron (BOMARC)

Location of Raco Army Airfield, Michigan

Raco Army Airfield is a closed military airfield. It is located 24.5 miles (39.4 km) west-southwest of Sault Ste. Marie, Michigan, United States. It was closed in 1972.

== History ==
=== World War II ===
An airfield at Raco was built before World War II. Its use was likely to provide air service to the locks at Sault Sainte Marie. It was acquired by the United States Government after the Pearl Harbor Attack and expanded through lease, license, easements and fees of different tracts of land. A small airfield with three 5,520' x 300' runways was constructed in a triangle pattern. A large number of dispersal points were built in a forested area to the west of the airfield, and a few support buildings were also erected in the woods. After construction, the airfield was designated Raco Auxiliary Airfield and a Sub-Base of the Air Transport Command Alpena Army Airfield.

The mission of Raco AAF was to serve as a refueling stop for aircraft headed for Alaska as well as to defend the locks of Sault Ste. Marie. However, no Air Force tactical units were assigned there during the war, and the few support personnel who were stationed there were under the command of the 4250th Army Air Force Base Unit at Alpena AAF. The United States Navy assigned some aviation personnel to the base as well. The base was inactive beginning in 1945, and after the end of World War II, the airfield was closed.

=== United States Army use ===
After the war, the United States Army retained ownership of the Raco site and used it as an anti-aircraft artillery site. Two former taxiways to the west of the runways were turned into roads, and over two dozen aircraft dispersal pads were modified into round artillery pads where 75-mm Skysweeper anti-aircraft guns were located. The guns were used to provide air defense against incoming aircraft flying at low altitudes to attack the entrance of the Soo locks & shipping narrows. Peak deployment for Skysweeper battalions at Raco was achieved in the mid-1950s when 8 battalions were deployed.

As more and more Nike Ajax missile sites came online and the USAF Air Defense Command fighter-interceptor K. I. Sawyer Air Force Base became operational in 1956, the US Army Air Defense Command (ARAACOM) reduced the number of batteries and eventually the site was closed at the end of 1957.

=== BOMARC Missile base ===
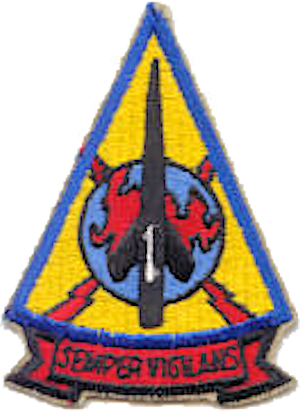

After the Army vacated the property, the Air Force began constructing an Air Defense Command CIM-10 Bomarc missile site to the east of the airfield. The supersonic Bomarc missiles were the first long-range anti-aircraft missiles in the world. They were capable of carrying conventional or nuclear warheads. Their intended role in defense was in an intrusion prevention perimeter. Bomarcs aligned on the eastern and western coasts of North America theoretically would launch and would destroy enemy bombers before the bombers could drop their payloads on industrial regions.

The 37th Air Defense Missile Squadron (BOMARC) was activated on 1 March 1960 with 28 CIM-10 Bomarc surface-to-air missiles (SAM). The missile facility was known as the Kincheloe AFB BOMARC site, consisting of a rectangular installation just southeast of the old runways. It operated the 2nd-generation IM-99B version of the BOMARC missile. About 40 personnel were stationed at the BOMARC site. The missiles remained on alert until they were inactivated on 31 July 1972.

== Current use ==
After the Air Force closed the missile site in 1972, the facility was transferred to the United States Forest Service. It is now managed as part of the Hiawatha National Forest and leased to Smithers-RAPRA as a winter automotive testing facility. The facility is known as the Smithers Winter Test Center, a cold-weather testing site for vehicles and components in harsh winter climatic conditions. The test site features over 750 acres of snow, ice (approximately 40 acres) and bare pavement surfaces and is staffed by more than 40 employees proficient in creating and maintaining a variety of snow, ice, and dry area surfaces. The Test Center is used by manufacturers of vehicles ranging from small automobiles to Class 8 trucks, vehicle components (both OE and aftermarket), snow handling equipment, construction equipment, recreational and seasonal sport vehicles and military equipment. Smithers Winter Test Center has 17 separate testing areas for testing all types of vehicles and components.

== See also ==
- Michigan World War II Army Airfields
