= List of F-106 Delta Dart units of the United States Air Force =

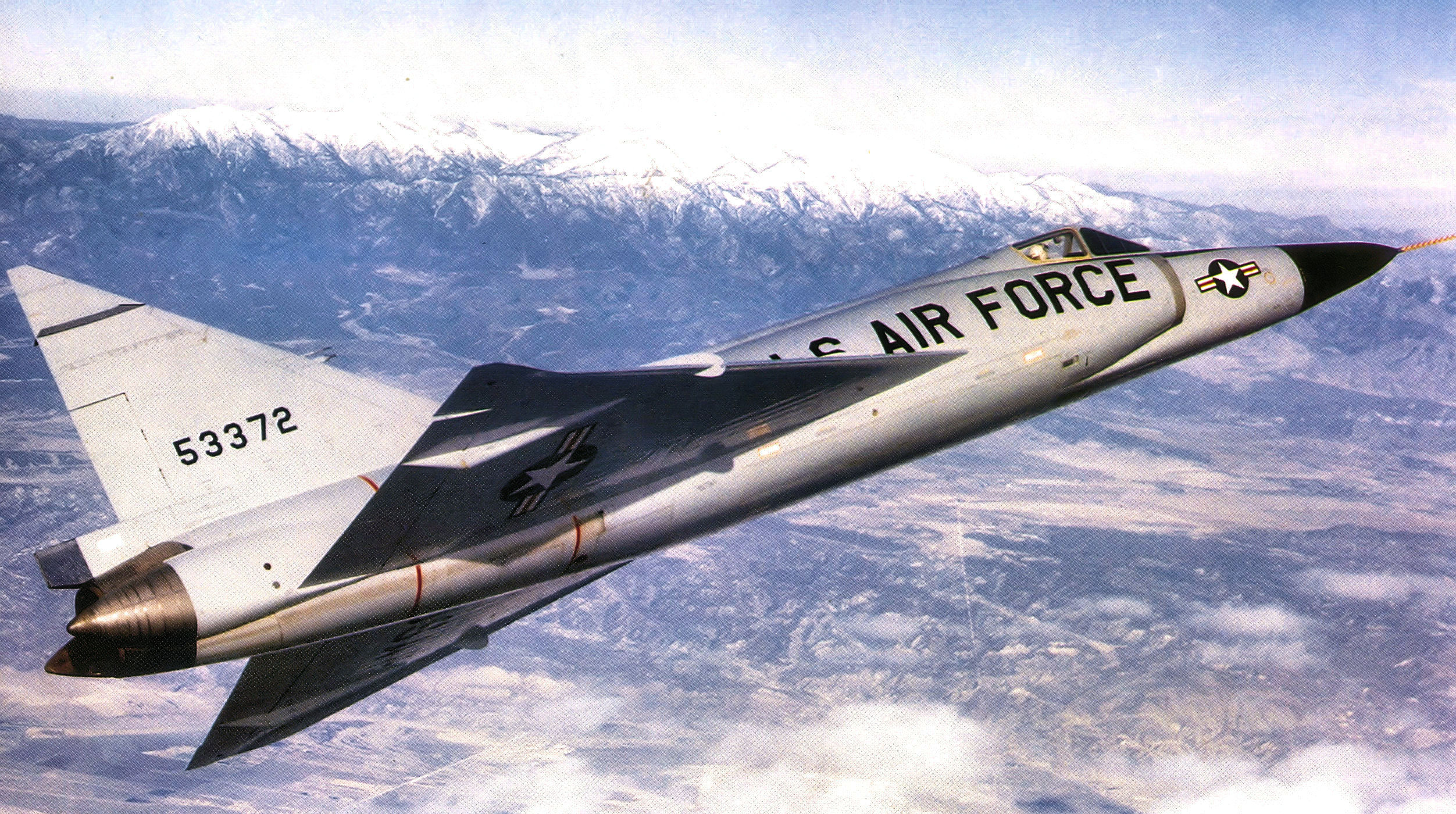
Convair F-102A-41-CO Delta Dagger 55-3372

This is a list of United States Air Force F-106 Delta Dart Squadrons. The F-106 is considered one of the finest all-weather interceptors ever built. It served on active duty with the United States Air Force Air Defense Command (and successor organizations) and Air Defense squadrons of the Air National Guard for almost 30 years, much longer than most of its contemporaries.

Originally designated the F-102B, it was redesignated F-106 because of extensive structural changes and a more powerful engine. The first F-106A flew on 26 December 1956, and deliveries to the USAF began in July 1959 with the 539th Fighter-Interceptor Squadron at McGuire AFB, New Jersey. Production ended in late 1961 after 277 single-seat F-106As and 63 two-seat F-106B trainers had been built. The last squadron to relinquish its F-106s was the 119th Fighter-Interceptor Squadron of the New Jersey Air National Guard, which sent its last plane to AMARC in August 1988.

The last operator of the F-106 was the 82d Aerial Targets Squadron, which used retired F-106s as target drones beginning in 1990. The last shoot down of a QF-106 (57-2524) took place at Holloman AFB on 20 February 1997. The last unexpended flyable 82d ATS QF-106 drone was sent to AMARC in January 1998 for storage.

== Air Defense Command/ADTAC Squadron Assignments ==
Number of aircraft assigned in parentheses

- 2d Fighter-Interceptor Squadron (20)

Wurtsmith AFB, Michigan, July 1971 – March 1973
Inactivated, A/C to AMARC
Air Defense Weapons Center (ADWC) (33)
Redesignated: 2d Fighter-Interceptor Training Squadron 15 August 1974
Redesignated: 2d Fighter Weapons Squadron 1 February 1982
Tyndall AFB, Florida, September 1974 – May 1984
Inactivated, A/C to AMARC

- 5th Fighter-Interceptor Squadron (45)

Minot AFB, North Dakota, February 1960 – April 1985
A/C to AMARC, re-equipped with F-15A Eagles

- 11th Fighter-Interceptor Squadron (33)

Duluth Airport, Minnesota, June 1960 – September 1968
Inactivated, A/C reassigned to 87th Fighter-Interceptor Squadron

- 27th Fighter-Interceptor Squadron (51)

Loring AFB, Maine, October 1959 – July 1971
Inactivated, A/C reassigned to 83d Fighter-Interceptor Squadron

- 48th Fighter-Interceptor Squadron (49)

Langley AFB, Virginia, September 1960 – March 1982
A/C to AMARC, re-equipped with F-15A Eagles

- 49th Fighter-Interceptor Squadron (46)

Griffiss AFB, New York, December 1968 – September 1987
Inactivated, A/C to AMARC, last active-duty USAF F-106 Squadron

- 71st Fighter-Interceptor Squadron (57)

Selfridge AFB, Michigan, October 1960
Richards-Gebaur AFB, Missouri, January 1967
Malmstrom AFB, Montana, July 1968 – July 1971
Inactivated, A/C reassigned to 319th Fighter-Interceptor Squadron

- 83d Fighter-Interceptor Squadron (20)

Loring AFB, Maine, July 1971 – June 1972
Inactivated, A/C to AMARC

- 84th Fighter-Interceptor Squadron (43)

Hamilton AFB, California, September 1968
Castle AFB, California, August 1973 – June 1981
A/C to AMARC, squadron realigned to 84th FITS (T-33A)

- 87th Fighter-Interceptor Squadron (37)

Duluth Airport, Minnesota, September 1968
K.I. Sawyer AFB, Michigan, May 1971 – October 1985
Inactivated, A/C to AMARC

- 94th Fighter-Interceptor Squadron (48)

Selfridge AFB, Michigan, April 1960
Wurtsmith AFB, Michigan, December 1969 – July 1971
A/C to AMARC, squadron realigned to 94th TFS (F-4E)

- 95th Fighter-Interceptor Squadron (55)

Andrews AFB, Maryland, July 1959
Dover AFB, Delaware, July 1963 – Jan 1973
A/C to AMARC, squadron realigned to 95th TFTS (T-33)

- 318th Fighter-Interceptor Squadron (70)

McChord AFB, Washington, March 1960 – November 1983
A/C to AMARC, re-equipped with F-15A Eagles

- 319th Fighter-Interceptor Squadron

Malmstrom AFB, Montana, July 1971 – April 1972 (41)
Redesignated: 319th Fighter-Interceptor Training Squadron, 1 June 1975
Tyndall AFB, Florida, June 1975 – November 1977
Inactivated, A/C to AMARC

- 329th Fighter-Interceptor Squadron (35)

George AFB, California, July 1960 – June 1967
Inactivated, A/C to AMARC

- 437th Fighter-Interceptor Squadron (21)

Oxnard AFB, California, July – September 1968
Inactivated, replaced by 460th Fighter-Interceptor Squadron

- 438th Fighter-Interceptor Squadron (29)

Kincheloe AFB, Michigan, May 1960 – September 1968
Inactivated, replaced by 49th Fighter-Interceptor Squadron

- 456th Fighter-Interceptor Squadron (67)

Castle AFB, California, September 1959 – July 1968
Inactivated, replaced by 437th Fighter-Interceptor Squadron

- 460th Fighter-Interceptor Squadron (44)

Oxnard AFB, California, September 1968
Kingsley Field, Oregon, December 1969
Grand Forks AFB, North Dakota, April 1971 – July 1974
Inactivated, A/C to 194th Fighter-Interceptor Squadron

- 498th Fighter-Interceptor Squadron (66)

Geiger Field, Washington, May 1959
McChord AFB, Washington, July 1963
Paine Field, Washington, June 1966
Hamilton AFB, California, 30 September 1968
Reassigned/inactivated same day, replaced by 84th Fighter-Interceptor Squadron

- 539th Fighter-Interceptor Squadron (26)

McGuire AFB, New Jersey, May 1959 – June 1967
Inactivated, A/C to AMARC

== Air National Guard Squadron Assignments ==
Number of aircraft assigned in parentheses

- 101st Fighter-Interceptor Squadron (26)

Massachusetts Air National Guard
Otis ANGB, Massachusetts, April 1972 – February 1988
A/C to AMARC, re-equipped with F-15A Eagles

- 119th Fighter-Interceptor Squadron (35)

New Jersey Air National Guard
Atlantic City International Airport, New Jersey, October 1972-8 August 1988
A/C to AMARC, re-equipped with F-16C Falcons
Last operational USAF FIS with F-106s

- 159th Fighter-Interceptor Squadron (24)

Florida Air National Guard
Jacksonville International Airport, Florida, May 1974 – March 1986
A/C to AMARC, re-equipped with F-16C Falcons

- 171st Fighter-Interceptor Squadron (24)

Michigan Air National Guard
Selfridge Field, Michigan, December 1972 – August 1978
Re-equipped with F-4Cs; A/C reassigned to 84th Fighter-Interceptor Squadron

- 186th Fighter-Interceptor Squadron (32)

Montana Air National Guard
Great Falls International Airport, Montana, April 1972 – June 1987
A/C to AMARC, re-equipped with F-16C Falcons

- 194th Fighter-Interceptor Squadron (23)

California Air National Guard
Fresno International Airport, California, May 1974 – January 1984
A/C to AMARC, re-equipped with F-4Ds

== Other USAF Assignments ==
- Air Force Flight Test Center

6510th Test Wing
6511th Test Group
Edwards AFB, California, May 1957-February 1998

- 73d Air Division (Air Defense Weapons Center)

Tyndall AFB, Florida, October 1959-1984

- 475th (later, 53d) Weapons Evaluation Group (QF-106)

82d Aerial Targets Squadron
82d Aerial Targets Squadron (Det 1.) (Holloman AFB, New Mexico)
Eglin AFB, Florida, November 1990-January 1998

In addition to the USAF, F-106s were operated in limited numbers by Convair, Rockwell International and Hughes Aircraft for Air Force testing programs, and by NASA for almost 40 years (1961–1999).
