= Kincheloe Air Force Base =

Former US Air Force base near Kincheloe, MI, US

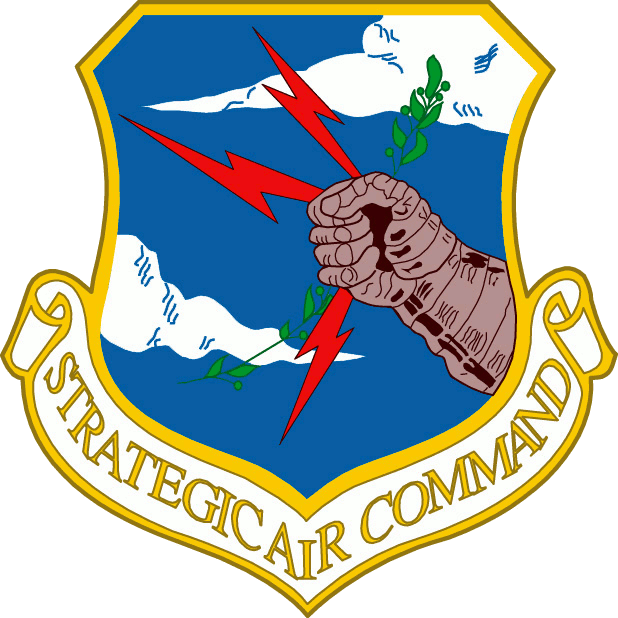
Kincheloe Air Force Base
- Part of Strategic Air Command (SAC)
- Kinross Charter Township, Michigan
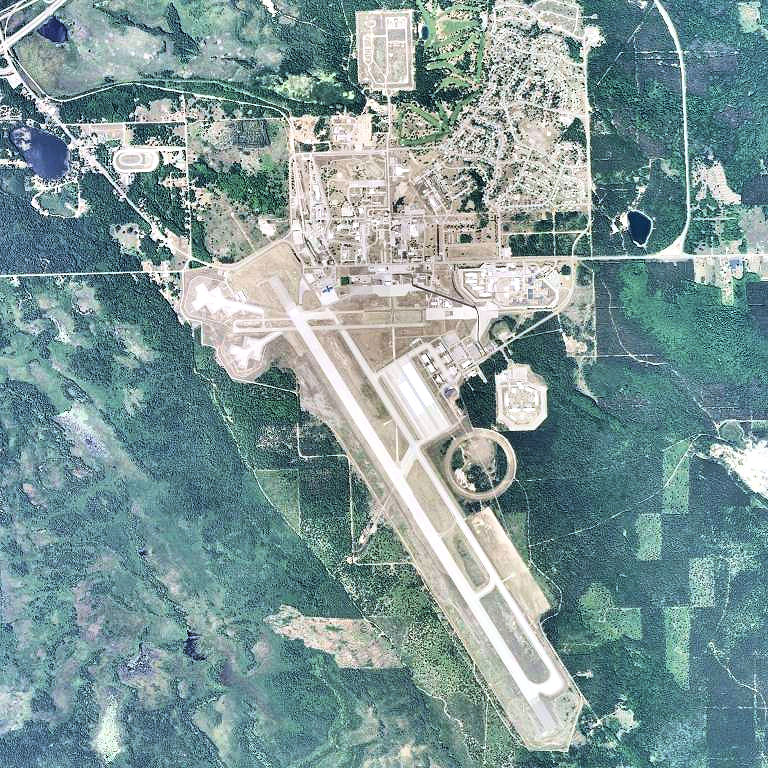
- 2006 USGS photo

Site information
- Type: Air Force Base
- Controlled by: Air Force

Location
- location of Kincheloe AFB, south of Sault Ste. Marie
- Coordinates: 46°15′03″N 084°28′21″W

Site history
- Built: 1943
- Built by: United States
- In use: 1941–1944; 1952–1977

Garrison information
- Garrison: 449th Bombardment Wing

Kincheloe Air Force Base was a United States Air Force (USAF) base during the Cold War. Built in the Upper Peninsula of Michigan in 1943 during World War II, the base was in service until 1977.

The base was known by various names, including Kinross Municipal Airport, Kinross Army Air Field, Kinross Air Field, Kinross Air Force Auxiliary Field, and Kinross Air Force Base. The present-day Chippewa County International Airport, Kinross Correctional Facility, and the community of Kincheloe are located on the site of the base. The base was named for Iven Kincheloe (1928–1958), a test pilot from Michigan.

== History ==
=== Origins ===
During World War II, the Soo Locks were considered vital to the war efforts. An airport was planned in Kinross as early as June 1941. The airport was built by the United States Government through lease, license, easements and by fee of different tracts of land. A small airfield with three 5,520-foot x 300-foot runways was constructed in a triangle pattern with a small aircraft parking area and a few support buildings. The airfield was designated the Kinross Auxiliary Airfield, and was designated a Sub-Base of the Air Transport Command Alpena Army Airfield.

The mission of Kinross AAF was to serve as a refueling stop for aircraft headed for Alaska as well as to defend the locks of Sault Ste. Marie. However, no tactical units were assigned there during the war and the few support personnel who were stationed there were under the command of the 4250th Army Air Force Base Unit at Alpena AAF. The base was inactive beginning in 1945, and after the end of World War II, the airfield was leased to the City of Sault Ste. Marie for a civilian airport.

After the war, the airfield then served as a hub for private and commercial aviation. The city operated the airport and Capital Airlines and Trans-Canada Air Lines used it for commercial air service from 1945 to 1952.

=== Air Defense Command ===

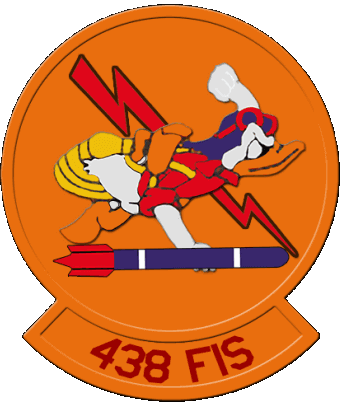

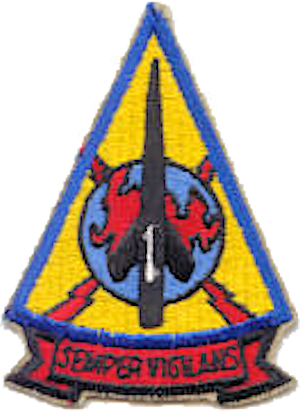

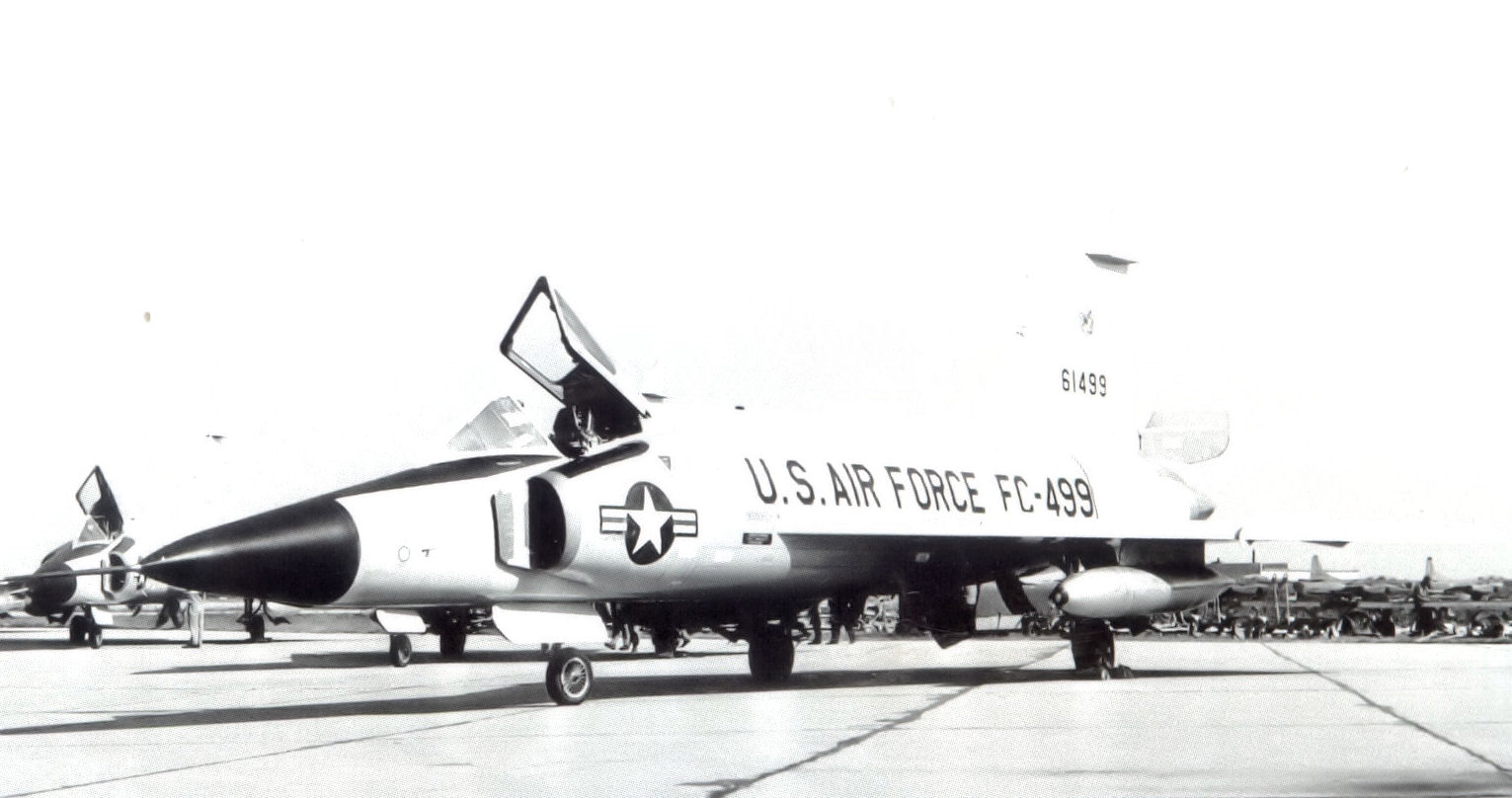
438th Fighter-Interceptor Squadron Convair F-102A-80-CO Delta Dagger, AF Ser. No. 56-1499, 507th Fighter Group, July 1958

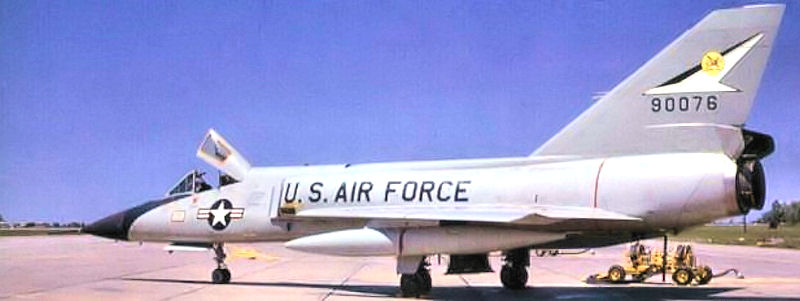
F-106 Delta Dart, AF Ser. No. 59-0076, circa 1967

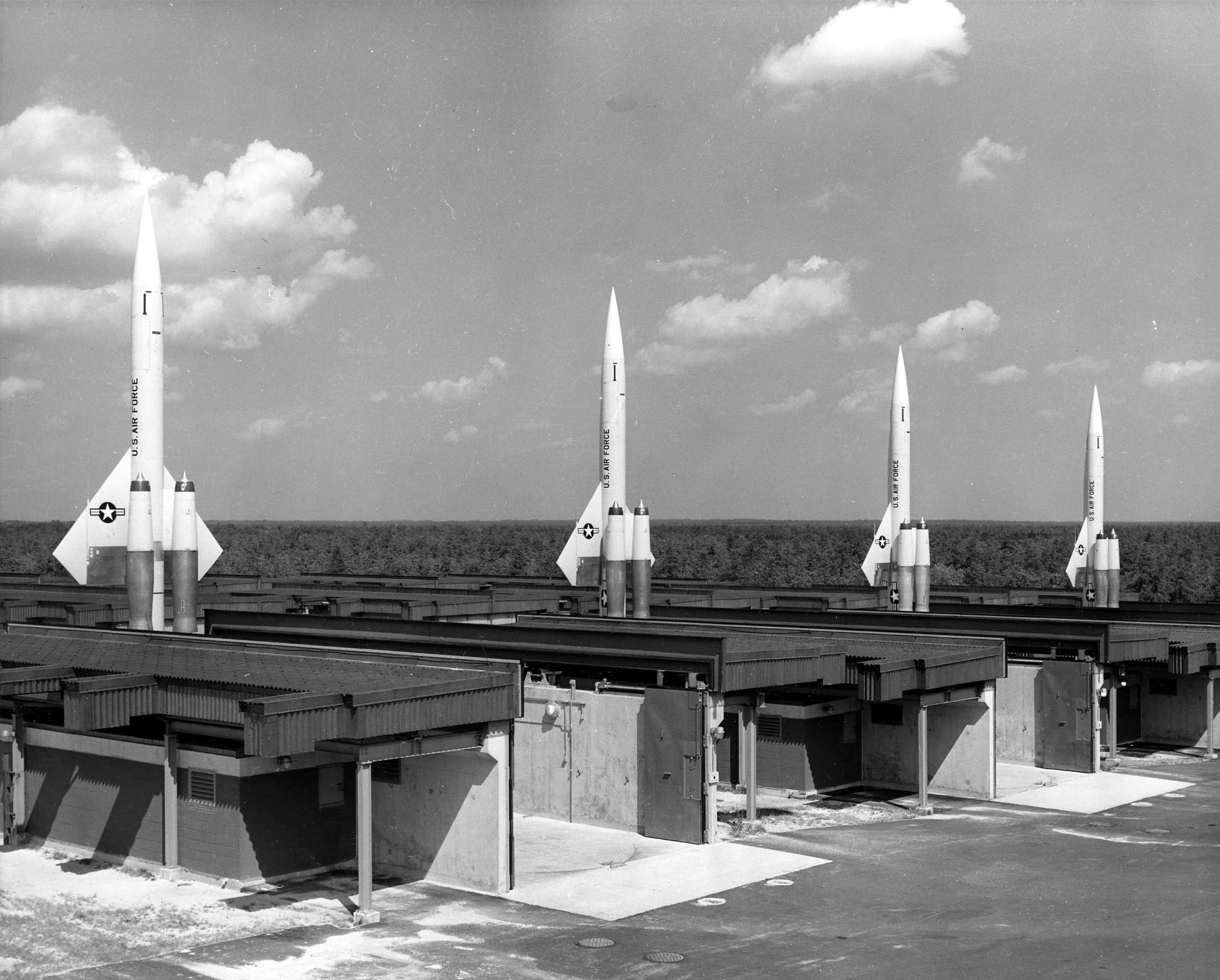
BOMARC surface-to-air missile battery

With the outbreak of the Cold War in 1948 and active combat in the Korean War in June, 1950, the United States began building up its defenses. Army troops returned to the Sault, and the World War II Kinross Auxiliary Airfield, with its close proximity to the locks was reactivated using a right of return. On 1 July 1952, Kinross Air Force Base was transferred from civil control to the United States Air Force. It was placed under the jurisdiction of 30th Air Division, Air Defense Command and was planned as a fighter-interceptor base to provide air defense for Sault Ste Marie and the upper Great Lakes.

In October, 1952, the 4685th Air Base Squadron was assigned to the reactivated Kinross AFB. A month later the unit was redesignated as the 91st Air Base Squadron. Much construction was necessary to bring the World War II auxiliary airfield up to postwar USAF standards. Additional land surrounding the base was appropriated for military facilities and extended runways. A 7,000-foot jet runway (16/34) was laid down along with accompanying taxiways, concrete block buildings and other support facilities to replace the existing structures that were viewed as substandard for a permanent Air Force base.

On 16 February 1953, the first operational ADC unit, the 534th Air Defense Group was activated at Kinross AFB. It was assigned to the 4706th Defense Wing at O'Hare International Airport, Illinois. The 438th Fighter-Interceptor Squadron was activated at the new base on 27 April, equipped with first-generation Lockheed F-94B Starfire jet interceptor aircraft. That same month, the base was closed to private noncommercial aviation because of the interceptor aircraft being flown off the field by the pilots of the 438th. The 438th FIS was upgraded quickly to new Northrop F-89D Scorpion interceptors as soon as they could be delivered and the F-94Bs were transferred to the Air National Guard.

Flying out of Kinross, On November 23, 1953, pilot Felix Moncla and Radar Operator Robert Wilson and their plane disappeared while pursuing a UFO over the Soo Locks and Lake Superior.

Kinross was considered a vital Air Defense Command base, an alert-status military base equipped with interceptors ready 24/7 to respond to unknown aircraft picked up by Ground Control Radar stations in the Great Lakes region. Upon activation, Kinross-based interceptors were directed to intercept unknown aircraft by ADC surveillance Radars at Sault Sainte Marie AFS (P-86); Grand Marais AFS (M-109); Calumet AFS (P-16); Alpena AFS (M-105) and Empire AFS (P-34).

On 18 August 1955, the 534th ADS was inactivated and immediately replaced by the 507th Fighter Group (Air Defense) in a name-only re-designation. This was part of the ADC "Project Arrow" program, which was designed to bring back on the active list the fighter units which had compiled memorable records in the two world wars. The 438th FIS was unaffected by this re-designation, and was transferred to the 507th FG. On 8 July 1956, command and control of the 507th FG was transferred to the 37th Air Division at Truax Field, Wisconsin. At that time, intercepts by the 507th FG were directed by a Manual Direction and Control Center (MDCC) (SM-168) at Truax Field which received radar data from a wider series of search and height surveillance radars in the Great Lakes Area. In May 1957, the 438th FIS was upgraded to the new Convair F-102 Delta Dagger interceptor.

In May 1958 the 438th FIS was temporarily transferred to K. I. Sawyer AFB southeast of Marquette, while the main runway at Kinross was extended to 12,000 feet (3,700 m) in preparation for Strategic Air Command (SAC) B-52 Stratofortresses. The construction project was completed and the squadron returned in October 1958.

==== Kincheloe AFB ====
On September 25, 1959, Kinross AFB was officially renamed Kincheloe Air Force Base in honor of the late Captain Iven Kincheloe, a native of Cassopolis in southwestern Michigan. On 7 September 1956, Kincheloe became the first pilot to climb above 100,000 feet (30.5 km), as he rocketed to a peak altitude of 126,200 ft (38.5 km) in the Bell X-2 rocket-powered research airplane. For this spectacular flight, he was awarded the Mackay Trophy and nicknamed "America's No. 1 Spaceman." Less than two years later, he was killed in the crash of an F-104 Starfighter on 26 July 1958 at Edwards AFB, California.

The importance of Kincheloe AFB to ADC was evident in 1960 with some major changes. The 37th Air Defense Missile Squadron (BOMARC) was activated on 1 March 1960 with 28 CIM-10 Bomarc surface-to-air missiles (SAM). The supersonic Bomarc missiles were the first long-range anti-aircraft missiles in the world. They were capable of carrying conventional or nuclear warheads. The missile site was located at the World War II Raco Army Airfield, 46°20′53″N 084°48′18″W about 17 miles west-northwest of Kincheloe AFB. This facility was known as the Kincheloe AFB BOMARC site. The BOMARC site was a rectangular installation, just southeast of the old runways. It operated the 2nd-generation IM-99B version of the BOMARC missile. About 40 personnel were stationed at the BOMARC site. The missiles remained on alert until they were inactivated on 31 July 1972.

Next, Kincheloe AFB was assigned to the Sault Sainte Marie Air Defense Sector (SsmADS) at K. I. Sawyer AFB on 1 April 1960 and came under the Semi Automatic Ground Environment (SAGE) Data Center (DC-14). The SAGE system was a computer-controlled network linking USAF (and later FAA) General Surveillance Radar stations into a centralized center for Air Defense, intended to provide early warning and response for a Soviet nuclear attack.

The 438th Fighter-Interceptor Squadron was upgraded again to the F-106 Delta Dart interceptor in June 1960, one of the first ADC squadrons to receive the new interceptor. In addition, the 507th Fighter Group was upgraded to the 507th Fighter Wing (Air Defense), which was established, and activated, on 28 December 1960. With the upgrade to wing level, the 507th Combat Support Group became the host unit at Kincheloe on 1 February 1961.

The 507th Fighter Wing continued to employ F-106 aircraft at Kincheloe AFB until its inactivation on Sep. 30, 1968. Air Defense Command inactivated its interceptor facilities due to budgetary reasons caused by the cost of the Vietnam War. By the late 1960s, and with the development of Intercontinental Ballistic Missiles (ICBM), it was believed that the chance of a Soviet bomber attack on the United States was remote and the USAF began closing fighter-interceptor bases at the direction of the Secretary of Defense. The BOMARC missiles were inactivated four years later in 1972.

As a result of the phase down, ADC moved the 438th Fighter Interceptor Squadron to Griffiss AFB, New York. With its inactivation, jurisdiction of Kincheloe AFB was transferred to Strategic Air Command on 1 October 1968.

=== Strategic Air Command ===
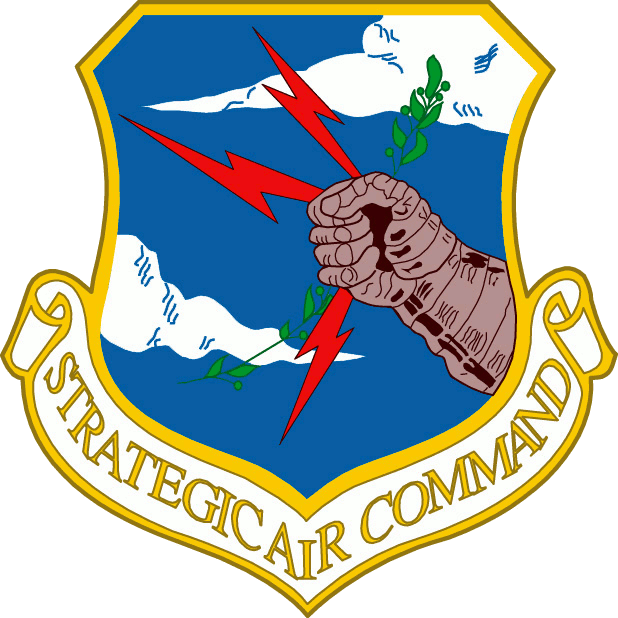

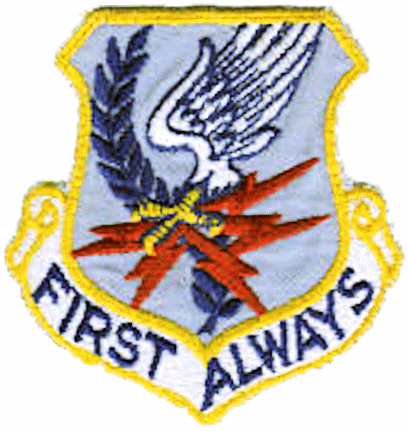

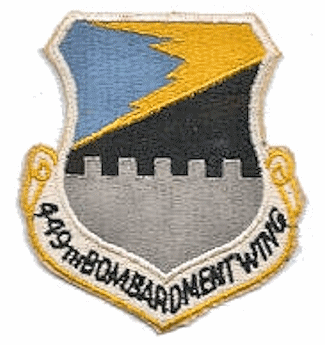

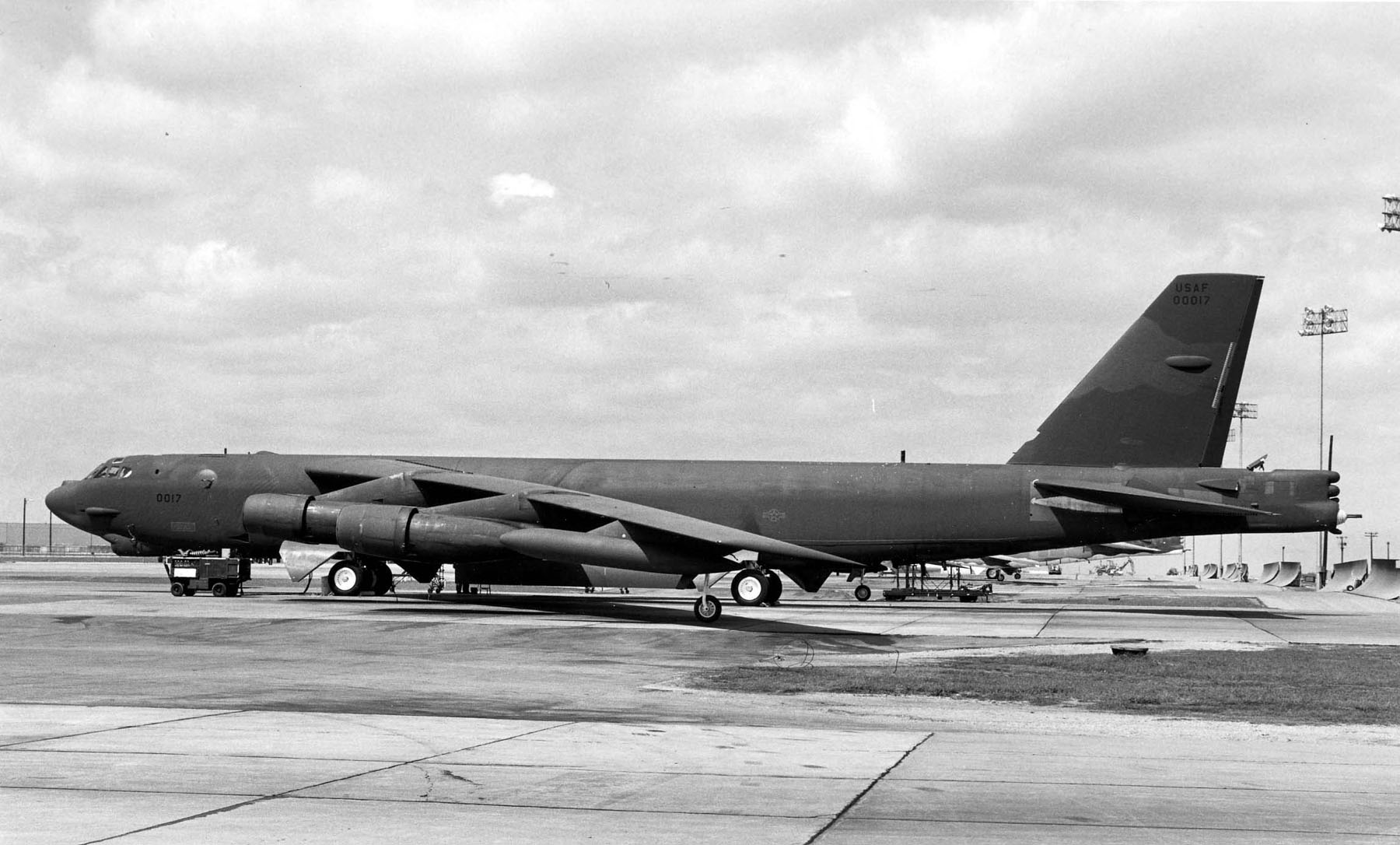
A Boeing B-52H, AF Ser. No. 60-0017, of the type assigned to the 449th Bomb Wing

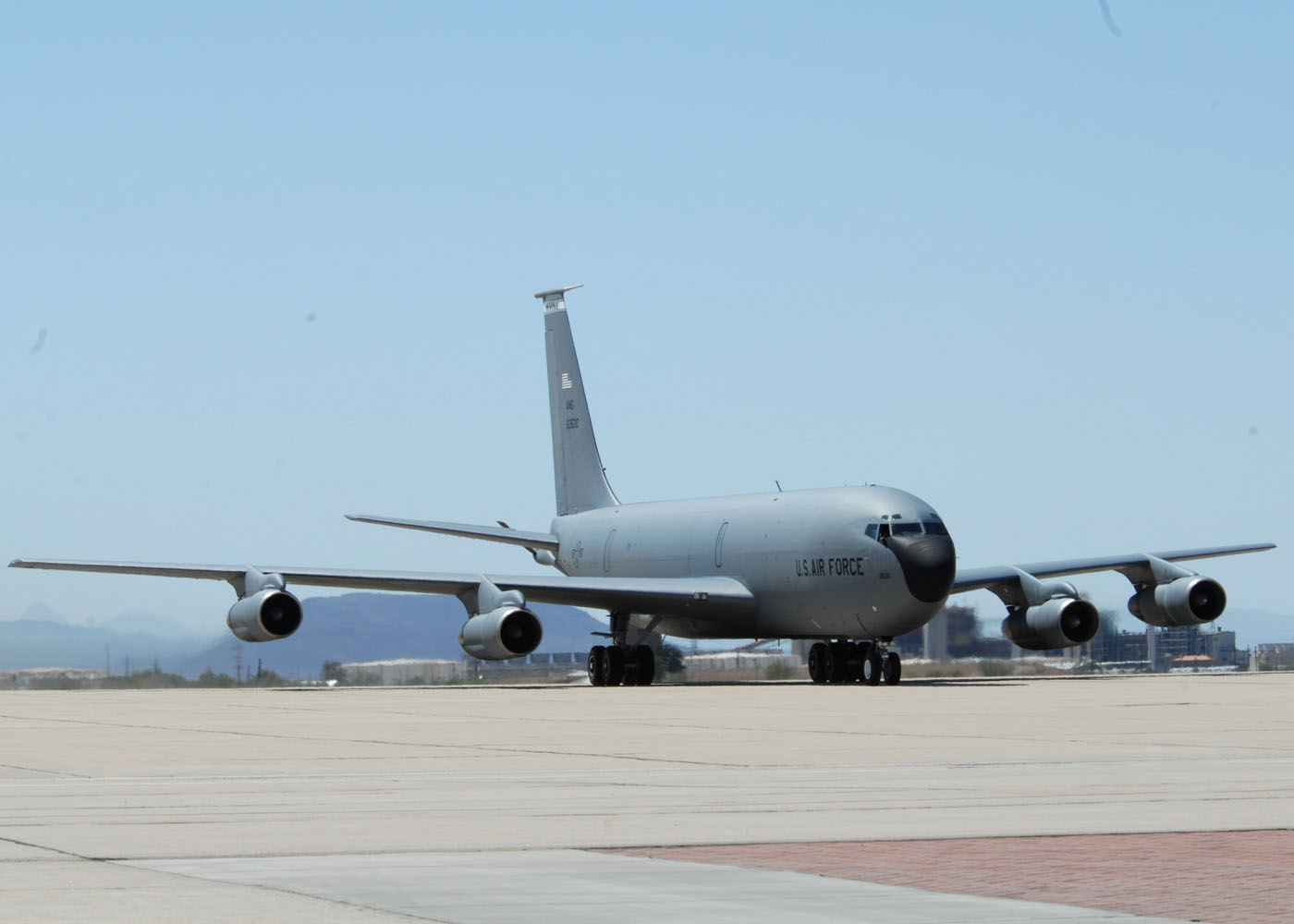
KC-135 Stratotanker

In the 1950s, the USAF adopted a policy of dispersing Strategic Air Command (SAC) bombers and tankers. At Kincheloe the runway was extended to 12,000 feet in 1958 to accommodate 15 B-52H bombers and ten KC-135 tankers. In addition to the runway, overruns of 1,000 feet (305 m) were constructed on both ends of the runway, along with 75-foot (23 m) shoulders on each side of the runway, providing a paved width of 300 feet (91 m). Along with the runway extension, a "Christmas tree" alert pad area was constructed on the north side of the runway end to accommodate alert aircraft, as well as a "Mole hole" crew living facility, where alert crews would live on shifts ready to man the alert aircraft and take off within a few minutes' notice. The original cost of the undertaking was estimated at $30 million.

On 2 February 1959, SAC established the 4239th Strategic Wing at Kincheloe AFB, Michigan as part of SAC's plan to disperse its B-52 Stratofortress heavy bombers over a larger number of bases, thus making it more difficult for the Soviet Union to knock out the entire fleet with a surprise first strike.

In November, 1961, following two years of construction, the 4239th Strategic Wing of SAC arrived with B-52 bombers. On May 1, 1962, the SAC wing at Kincheloe was declared operationally ready. The wing consisted of the 93d Bombardment Squadron, consisting of 15 B-52Hs. Half of the aircraft were maintained on fifteen-minute alert, fully fueled, armed, and ready for combat. SAC Strategic Wings were considered a provisional unit by Headquarters, USAF and could not carry a permanent history or lineage.

In 1962, in order to retain the lineage of its MAJCOM 4-digit combat units and to perpetuate the lineage of many currently inactive bombardment units with illustrious World War II records, Headquarters SAC received authority from Headquarters USAF to discontinue its MAJCOM strategic wings that were equipped with combat aircraft and to activate AFCON units, most of which were inactive at the time which could carry a lineage and history.

The 4239th Strategic Wing was inactivated as the 449th Bombardment Wing (449 BW) was activated on 15 Nov 1962 and organized (i.e., the assignment of personnel & equipment) on 1 February 1963, assigned to SAC's Second Air Force, 40th Air Division. The 93 BS was also inactivated and replaced by the 716th Bombardment Squadron, one of the USAF's historical World War II bomb squadrons, being activated on 15 Nov 1962 and organized on the same date as the 449th Bombardment Wing. The 908th Air Refueling Squadron (Heavy), was assigned and organized on 01 Jul 1963 and the 70th Munitions Maintenance Squadron designation was unchanged, and component support units (the 4239th / 449th Airborne Missile Maintenance Squadron; 4239th / 449th Armament & Electronics Maintenance Squadron; 4239th / 449th Field Maintenance Squadron; and the 4239th / 449th Organizational Maintenance Squadron) underwent the same actions as the newly established wing.

On 1 Oct 1968, the 449th became the host unit assigned to Kincheloe AFB with the inactivations of the 507th Fighter Wing (Air Defense) and the activations & Organizations of the 449th Combat Support Group, the 449th Civil Engineering Squadron, 449th Security Police Squadron, 449th Services Squadron, 449th Supply Squadron, and the 449th Transportation Squadron. As under the Tri-Deputate organization, all flying components were directly assigned to the wing, and no operational group element was activated. With the activation, the history, lineage and honors of the 449th Bombardment Group were bestowed upon the newly established wing upon activation.

The 449th and its subordinate units' mission was to operate at full readiness, and support activities included aircraft and vehicle maintenance, bombing crew and unit training, and air refueling support. The wing did deploy individual B-52 crews, but not its B-52H aircraft, to Southeast Asia during the Vietnam War, as the Kincheloe B-52Hs were strictly dedicated to SAC's strategic deterrence mission. However, Kincheloe's KC-135A tanker aircraft and aircrews participated in the "Young Tiger" TDY effort, and the bomber aircrews went through RTU training to fly older B-52Ds out of Andersen AFB, Guam and U-Tapao RTAFB, Thailand and were active participants in many of the notable campaigns that took place in Southeast Asia such as Arc Light, November 1965 – December 1975, and B-52 crews, May 1968 – June 1975. During Operation Linebacker II between 18 - 29 Dec 1972, one 449 BW crew was shot down.

On 30 November 1971, the 1883d Communications Squadron, reassigned from the 1964th Communications Group and the Vietnam War, moved to Kincheloe AFB and came under the command of the Northern Communications Area.

=== Inactivation ===
In December 1965, the Department of Defense announced a decision to close Kincheloe AFB by October 1971. The decision to close Kincheloe was part of a phase-down of the SAC B-52 bomber fleet as a result of the operational deployment of Minuteman ICBMs and the increasing cost of the Vietnam War that was stretching the Defense Budget. Political pressure in the U.S. Congress, however, led to the May 1971 decision to not close the base and it remained an active SAC installation. This was only a six-year reprieve, as the base was inactivated on 30 September 1977 as part of an ongoing Reduction in Force in the USAF following the end of the Vietnam War.

The B-52s and KC-135s of the 449th were reassigned to other SAC units, and the wing was inactivated on 30 September 1977, concurrently with the closure of Kincheloe AFB. On 1 October 1977 the 1883d Communications Squadron was moved to Beale AFB, California (Miller 1990).

== Current uses ==
Portions of the base had already been transferred to local authorities, and following the deactivation all the remaining property was transferred, although the federal government reserved the right to have exclusive or non-exclusive use of the airport facilities during a declared national emergency.

Despite the loss of approximately 10,000 personnel living in the area, the base has been successfully redeveloped since closing. Chippewa County International Airport, Kinross Correctional Facility, Chippewa Correctional Facility, Kinross Manufacturing, American Kinross, Inc. and Rudyard Area Schools are now located on the property. In all, the local tax base had doubled, and the civilian payroll created by the new ventures had reached $110 million.

The base was used in the filming of the 1990 movie Die Hard 2, starring Bruce Willis. Other scenes were shot at the Alpena Airport. The location was chosen in part because there was a need for snow, and the producers expected Alpena to produce. However, due to a lack of snowfall, artificial snow had to be used.

== See also ==
- Michigan World War II Army Airfields
