= 438th Fighter-Interceptor Squadron =

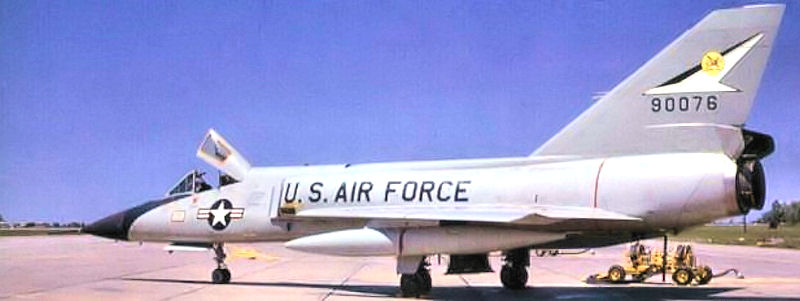
- Convair F-106 about 1967 with squadron emblem in tail markings
- Active: 1943–1944: 1953–1968
- Country: United States
- Branch: United States Air Force
- Role: Fighter Interceptor

Insignia
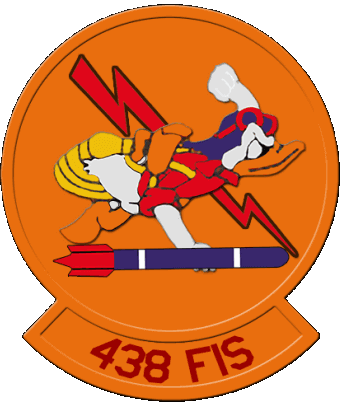
- 438th Fighter-Interceptor Squadron emblem (F-106 era)

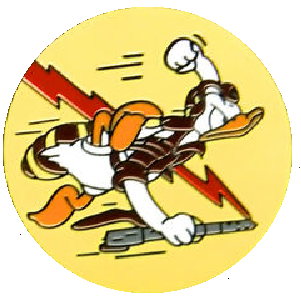
- 438th Fighter Squadron emblem (approved 16 February 1944)

The 438th Fighter-Interceptor Squadron is an inactive United States Air Force unit. Its last assignment was with the 35th Air Division at Griffiss Air Force Base, New York, where it was inactivated on 30 September 1968. The squadron was first activated as the 438th Fighter Squadron during World War II. It served as a Replacement Training Unit until the spring of 1944, when it was disbanded in a general reorganization of Army Air Forces training units. It was reactivated in 1953 as an air defense unit and served in that role until inactivated.

== History ==
=== World War II ===
Republic P-47 Thunderbolt as flown by the squadron

The squadron was first organized in February 1943 at Page Field, Florida as the fourth squadron of the 53d Fighter Group. It was initially equipped with Bell P-39 Airacobras, but before the year was over, switched to training pilots with the Republic P-47 Thunderbolt. The squadron was a Replacement Training Unit, an oversized unit whose mission was to train individual pilots.

However, the Army Air Forces found that standard military units like the 438th, based on relatively inflexible tables of organization were not well adapted to the training mission. Accordingly, it adopted a more functional system in which each base was organized into a separate numbered unit, manned according to the base's mission. The 53d Group and its two squadrons at Page Field, along with supporting units there were disbanded and replaced by the 338th AAF Base Unit (Replacement Training Unit, Fighter) in May 1944.

=== Air Defense Command ===
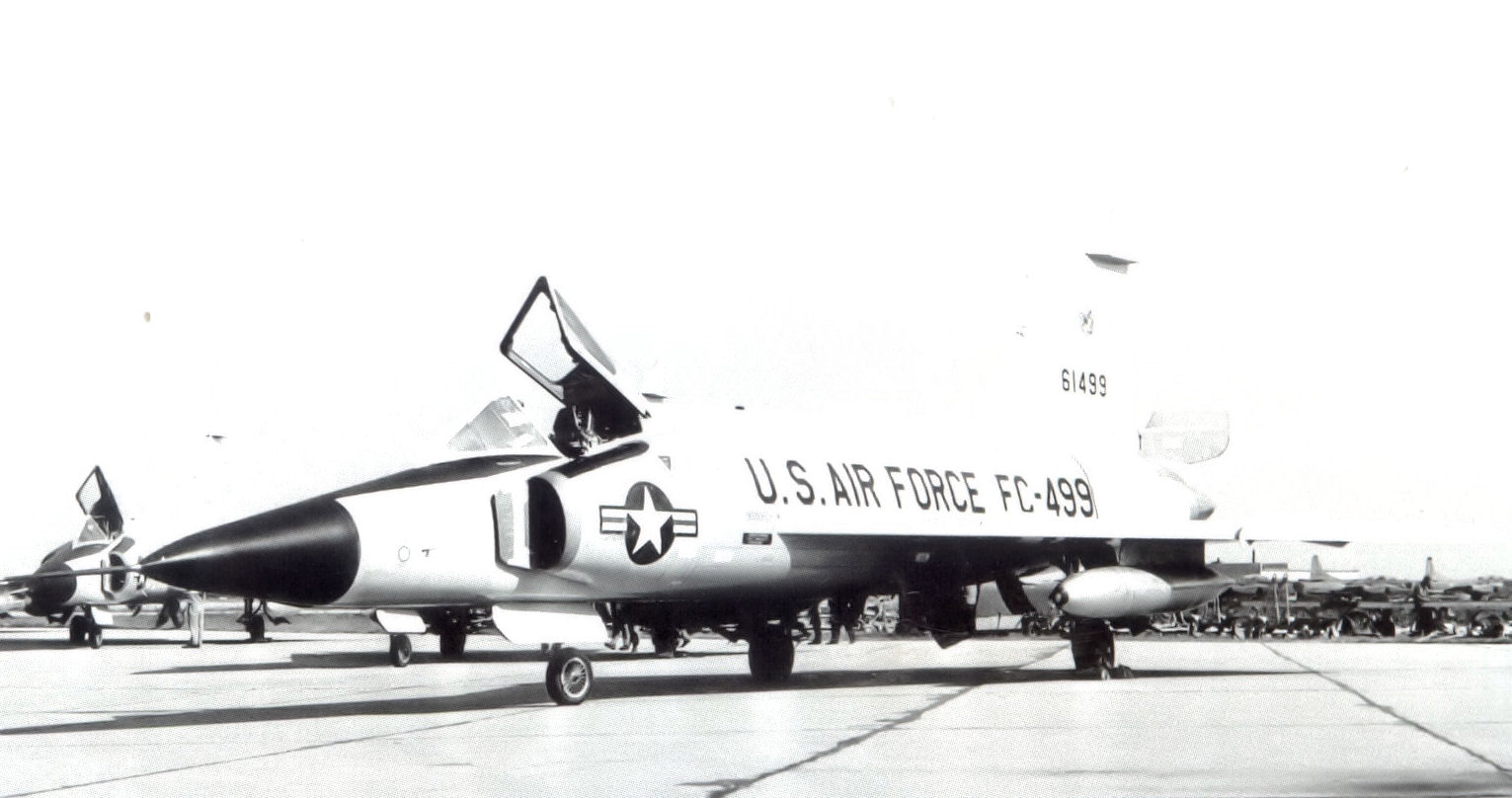
438th FIS F-102A Delta Dagger (Note: Aircraft is Convair F-102A-80-CO Delta Dagger, serial 56-1499.)

The squadron was reactivated under Air Defense Command as the 438th Fighter-Interceptor Squadron, and stationed at Kinross Air Force Base, Michigan in April 1953. At its new base, the 438th was assigned to the 534th Air Defense Group and equipped with cannon-armed Lockheed F-94B Starfires. During the next seven years, it repeatedly upgraded its equipment. In December 1953 it transitioned into Northrop F-89D Scorpions, armed with FFAR rockets, and in the May 1957 into Convair F-102A Delta Daggers, equipped with data link for Semi-Automatic Ground Environment operations and armed with AIM-4 Falcons. In June 1960 it received the Convair F-106 Delta Darts that would equip it for the remainder of the time it was on active duty. In August 1955, as part of Project Arrow, the 534th Group was inactivated and the squadron became part of the 507th Fighter Group.

On 22 October 1962, before President John F. Kennedy told Americans that missiles were in place in Cuba, the squadron dispersed one third of its force, equipped with nuclear tipped missiles to Phelps Collins Air National Guard Base at the start of the Cuban Missile Crisis. These planes returned to Kinchloe after the crisis.

Air defense fighter operations at Kinchloe ended on 30 September 1968 with the inactivation of the 507th Fighter Wing. The squadron moved to Griffiss Air Force Base, New York, where it transferred its F-106s to the 49th Fighter-Interceptor Squadron, which had been flying air defense missions with McDonnell F-101 Voodoos from Griffiss since 1959, and the 438th was inactivated the same day.

== Lineage ==
- Constituted as the 438th Fighter Squadron on 12 February 1943

Activated on 20 February 1943
Disbanded on 5 May 1944

- Reconstituted and redesignated 438th Fighter-Interceptor Squadron on 11 February 1953

Activated on 27 April 1953
Inactivated on 30 September 1968

=== Assignments ===
- 53d Fighter Group, 20 February 1943 – 1 May 1944
- 534th Air Defense Group, 27 April 1953
- 507th Fighter Group, 18 August 1955
- 507th Fighter Wing, 1 February 1961
- 35th Air Division, 30 September 1968

=== Stations ===
- Fort Myers Army Air Field (later Page Field), Florida, 20 February 1943 – 1 May 1944
- Kinross Air Force Base (later Kincheloe Air Force Base), Michigan, 27 April 1953
- Griffiss Air Force Base, New York, 30 September 1968

=== Aircraft ===
- Bell P-39 Airacobra, 1943
- Republic P-47 Thunderbolt, 1943–1944
- Lockheed F-94B Starfire, 1953
- Northrop F-89D Scorpion, 1953–1957
- Convair F-102 Delta Dagger, 1957–1960
- Convair F-106 Delta Dart, 1960–1968

== See also ==
- F-89 Scorpion units of the United States Air Force
- F-94 Starfire units of the United States Air Force
- List of F-106 Delta Dart units of the United States Air Force
