= 37th Air Defense Missile Squadron =

37th Air Defense Missile Squadron (later 37th Tactical Missile Squadron)
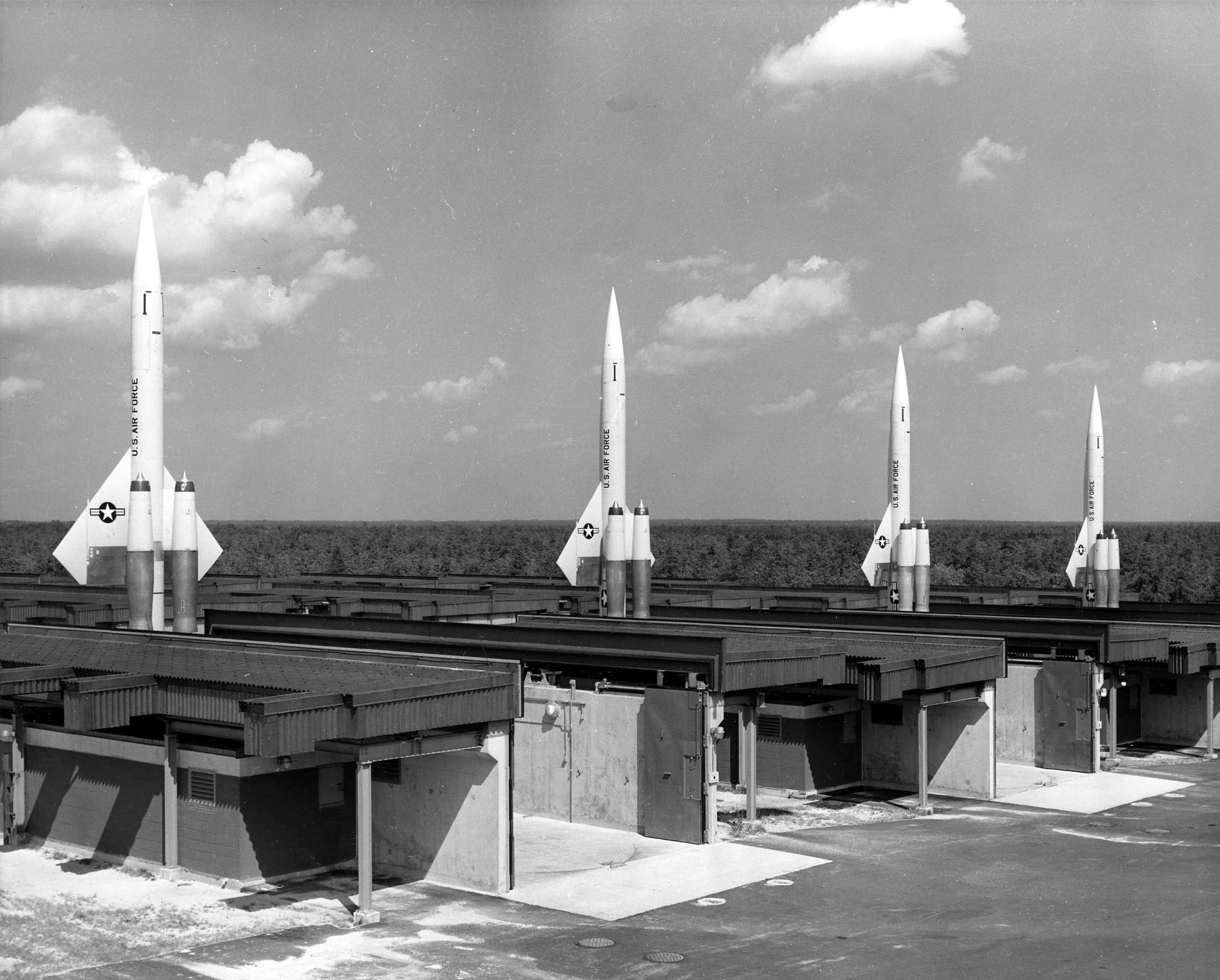
- CIM-10 BOMARC missile battery
- Active: 1942-1944, 1944-1946, 1960-1972
- Country: United States
- Branch: United States Air Force
- Role: bombardment training, strategic bombardment, surface-to-air missile
- Size: squadron
- Mottos: Semper Vigilans (Latin for 'Always Watchful') (1960-1972)
- Engagements: Pacific Theater
- Decorations: Distinguished Unit Citation; Air Force Outstanding Unit Award

Insignia
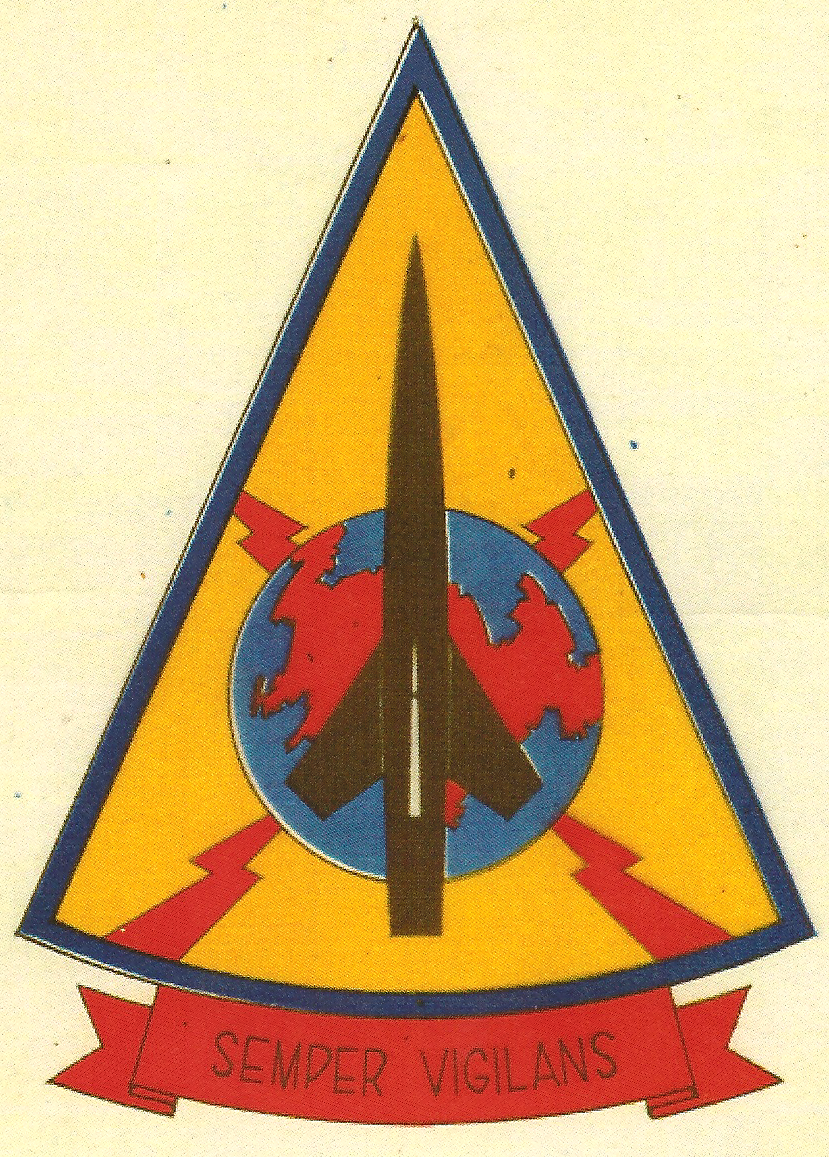
- 37th Air Defense Missile Squadron emblem (Note: Approved 26 October 1960. Description: On a sector of a circle, its apex upward, Air Force golden yellow, bordered Air Force blue, two red lightning flashes in saltire throughout surmounted by a medium blue globe, land areas red; all surmounted by a black missile in pale pointing upward, details white; outlines and details black throughout. On a red scroll, edged and inscribed black, [the motto]. Significance: Against a background of the Air Force colors, ultramarine blue and golden yellow, two lightning bolts, crossed, represent the electronic control of the defense weapons system. The globe and land mass indicate the land area to be defended from air attack. The missile-shaped figure dominating the emblem is symbolic of the potential power for defense contained within the assigned BOMARC weapon.)

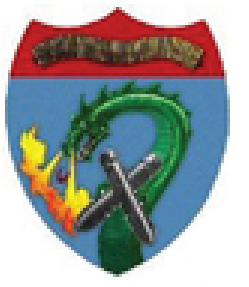
- 680th Bombardment Squadron emblem (Note: Apparently never approved. Maurer, Combat Squadrons, p. 705)

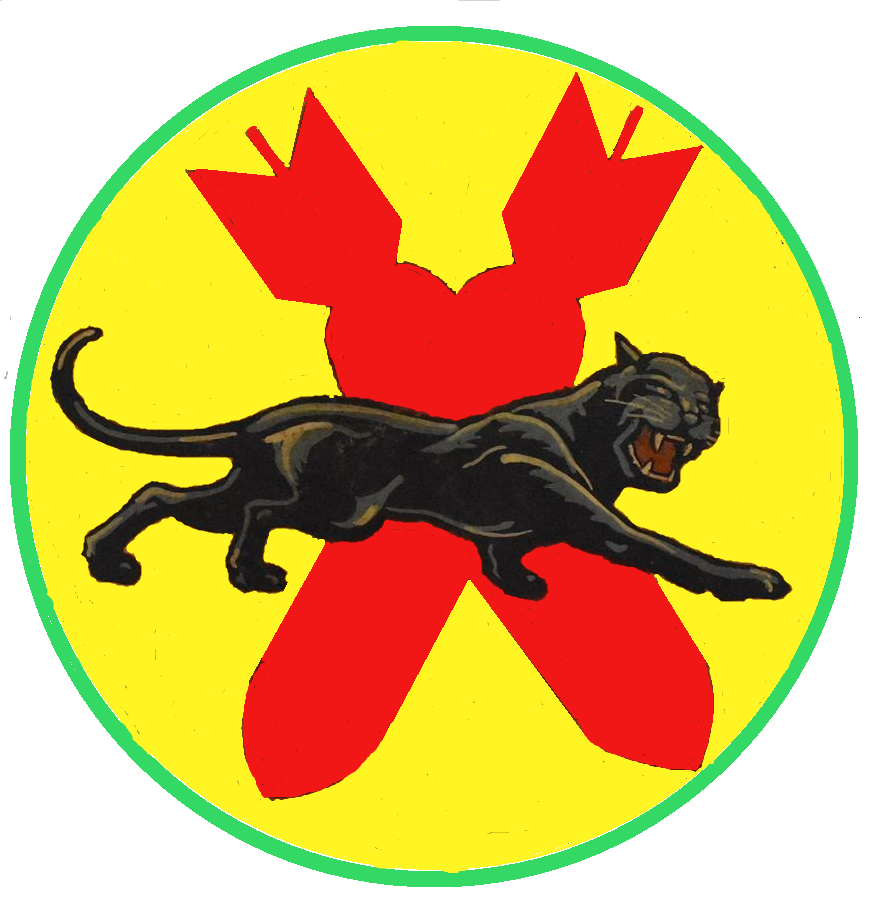
- 537th Bombardment Squadron emblem (Note: Approved 23 November 1943. Description: Over and through a light yellow disc, border light green, a black panther striking, proper in front of two aerial bombs in saltire.)

The 37th Tactical Missile Squadron is an inactive United States Air Force unit. It was last active as the 37th Air Defense Missile Squadron, assigned to the 23d Air Division, stationed near Kincheloe Air Force Base, Michigan, where it was inactivated on 31 July 1972.

After inactivation, the squadron was consolidated with two World War II bomber squadrons, the 537th Bombardment Squadron, a training unit active from 1942 to 1944, and the 680th Bombardment Squadron, which flew Boeing B-29 Superfortresses in the strategic campaign against Japan. The 680th was awarded a Distinguished Unit Citation for its actions. The consolidated squadron has not been active.

== History ==
=== World War II training unit ===
The squadron was first activated as the 537th Bombardment Squadron at Salt Lake City Army Air Base, Utah as one of the four squadrons of the 382d Bombardment Group in late 1942. It moved to Davis-Monthan Field, Arizona, where it was equipped with Consolidated B-24 Liberators and served as an operational training unit until late March 1943. The operational training unit program involved the use of an oversized parent unit to provide cadres to "satellite groups." It then moved to Pocatello Army Air Field, Idaho and became a replacement training unit. Replacement training units were also oversized, but focused on training individual pilots and aircrews. Its personnel were withdrawn circa 3 December 1943 as it moved to Muroc Army Air Field, California and it remained a paper unit until it was inactivated in March 1944.

=== World War II Combat in the Pacific ===
The second time the unit was activated, it was as the 680th Bombardment Squadron in December 1944 as a Boeing B-29 Superfortress very heavy bombardment squadron at Alamogordo Army Air Field, New Mexico. The 680th was equipped with later-model B-29As, with only minor differences than the original B-29 model built by Boeing with some revised engine nacelles and pneumatically-operated bomb-bay doors which could be snapped shut in less than a second. When its training at Alamogordo was completed. the squadron moved to North Field (Tinian) in the Mariana Islands of the Central Pacific Area in June 1945 and joined the XXI Bomber Command of Twentieth Air Force. Its arrival boosted the 504th Bombardment Group to its full authorization of three bombardment squadrons. Its mission was the strategic bombardment of the Japanese Home Islands and the destruction of Japan's war-making capability.

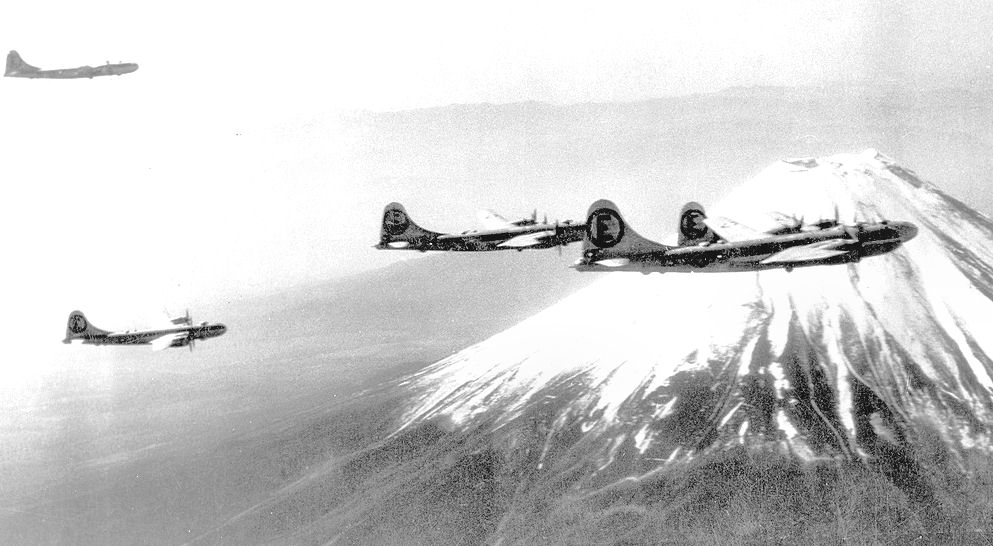
504th Bombardment Group over Mount Fuji 1945

The squadron flew low level nighttime incendiary raids until the end of the war in August 1945, attacking major Japanese cities, causing massive destruction of urbanized areas. Also flew mining operations against enemy shipping in Korean shipping lanes, the Shimonoseki Strait and harbors of the Inland Sea, for which it received a Distinguished Unit Citation. Also conducted raids against strategic objectives, bombing aircraft factories, chemical plants, oil refineries, and other targets in Japan. The squadron flew its last combat missions on 14 August when hostilities ended. Afterwards, its B-29s dropped relief food and supplies to Allied prisoner of war camps in Japan and Manchuria, flew show of force missions over Japan and missions to evaluate the damage inflicted on Japan by bombardment operations. The squadron was largely demobilized on Tinian during the fall of 1945. It moved to Clark Field in the Philippines, where it was inactivated in March 1946 and its low-hour aircraft were flown to storage depots in the United States.

=== Cold War air defense ===
The third predecessor of the squadron was activated on 1 March 1960 as the 37th Air Defense Missile Squadron It initially monitored the construction of the BOMARC missile facility near Raco, Michigan. The squadron moved to the missile site and was operational by 1 June 1961. By the end of 1961 the squadron stood alert using its complement of 24 IM-99B BOMARC surface to air antiaircraft missiles. During the 1962 Cuban Missile Crisis, the full squadron stood alert for 27 days. The squadron was tied into a Semi-Automatic Ground Environment (SAGE) direction center which could use analog computers to process information from ground radars, picket ships and airborne aircraft to accelerate the display of tracking data at the direction center to quickly direct the missile site to engage hostile aircraft. As the strategic bomber threat to the United States diminished, so did the need for the BOMARC missile and the squadron ceased operations on 1 July 1972, and was inactivated on 31 July 1972. The BOMARC missile site was located 19 miles northwest of Kincheloe Air Force Base at 46°20′53″N 084°48′18″W. Although geographically separated from the base, it was an off base facility of Kinchloe and received administrative and logistical support from Kinchloe.

=== Consolidation ===
The three squadrons were consolidated as the 37th Tactical Missile Squadron on 19 September 1985 while remaining inactive.

== Lineage ==
537th Bombardment Squadron

- Constituted as the 537th Bombardment Squadron (Heavy) on 28 October 1942

Activated on 3 November 1942
Inactivated on 31 March 1944
Consolidated with the 37th Air Defense Missile Squadron and the 680th Bombardment Squadron as the 37th Tactical Missile Squadron on 19 September 1985

680th Bombardment Squadron

- Constituted as the 680th Bombardment Squadron, Very Heavy on 25 November 1944

Activated on 4 December 1944
Inactivated on 15 June 1946
Consolidated with the 37th Air Defense Missile Squadron and the 680th Bombardment Squadron as the 37th Tactical Missile Squadron on 19 September 1985

37th Air Defense Missile Squadron

- Constituted as the 37th Air Defense Missile Squadron (BOMARC) on 23 September 1959

Activated on 1 March 1960
Inactivated on 31 July 1972
Consolidated with the 537th Bombardment Squadron and the 680th Bombardment Squadron as the 37th Tactical Missile Squadron on 19 September 1985

=== Assignments ===
- 382d Bombardment Group (Heavy), 3 November 1942 − 31 March 1944
- Second Air Force, 4 December 1944 (attached to 504th Bombardment Group after 15 June 1945)
- 504th Bombardment Group, Very Heavy, 14 November 1945 − 15 June 1946.
- 30th Air Division, 1 March 1960
- Sault Sainte Marie Air Defense Sector, 1 April 1960
- Duluth Air Defense Sector, 1 October 1963
- 29th Air Division, 1 April 1966
- 23d Air Division, 19 November 1969 − 31 July 1972

=== Stations ===
- Salt Lake City Army Air Base, Utah, 3 November 1942
- Davis-Monthan Field, Arizona, 23 January 1943
- Pocatello Army Air Field, Idaho, 5 April 1943
- Muroc Army Air Field, California, ca. 5 December 1943 − 31 March 1944 (not manned)
- Alamogordo Army Airfield, New Mexico, 4 December 1944 − 10 May 1945
- North Field, Tinian, Mariana Islands, 15 June 1945
- Clark Field, Luzon, Philippines, 13 March 1946 − 15 June 1946
- Kinchloe Air Force Base, Michigan, 1 March 1960 − 31 July 1972

=== Awards and campaigns ===
Award streamer	Award	Dates	Notes
	Distinguished Unit Citation	Japan and Korea, 27 July − 14 August 1945	680th Bombardment Squadron (Note: Maurer and AF Pamphlet 900-2 also credit the 680th with a second award on 28 May 1945, however this citation was earned by the 504th Bombardment Group and its component squadrons before the 680th arrived in the Pacific Theater and has been deleted in the most recent AFHRA source.)
	Air Force Outstanding Unit Award	30 August 1965 − 3 March 1967	37th Air Defense Missile Squadron
	Air Force Outstanding Unit Award	31 March 1971 − 31 March 1972	37th Air Defense Missile Squadron

Campaign Streamer	Campaign	Dates	Notes
	American Theater without inscription	3 November 1942 − 31 March 1944	537th Bombardment Squadron
	Air Offensive, Japan	15 June 1945 – 2 September 1945	680th Bombardment Squadron
	Western Pacific	15 June 1945 – 2 September 1945	680th Bombardment Squadron

=== Aircraft and Missiles ===
- Consolidated B-24 Liberator, 1943
- Boeing B-29 Superfortress, 1945–1946
- Boeing IM-99 (later CIM-10) BOMARC, 1960−1972

== See also ==
- List of United States Air Force missile squadrons
