= Cloncurry Airport =

- IATA: CNJ; ICAO: YCCY

Summary
- Airport type: Public
- Operator: Cloncurry Shire Council
- Location: Cloncurry, Queensland
- Elevation AMSL: 616 ft / 188 m
- Coordinates: 20°39′55″S 140°30′23″E

Map
- Location in Queensland

Runways
Direction	Length		Surface
Direction	m	ft	Surface
06/24	1,157	3,796	Asphalt
12/30	2,000	6,562	Asphalt
- Sources: Australian AIP and aerodrome chart

Cloncurry Airport (IATA: CNJ, ICAO: YCCY) is an airport in Cloncurry, Queensland, Australia.

== History ==
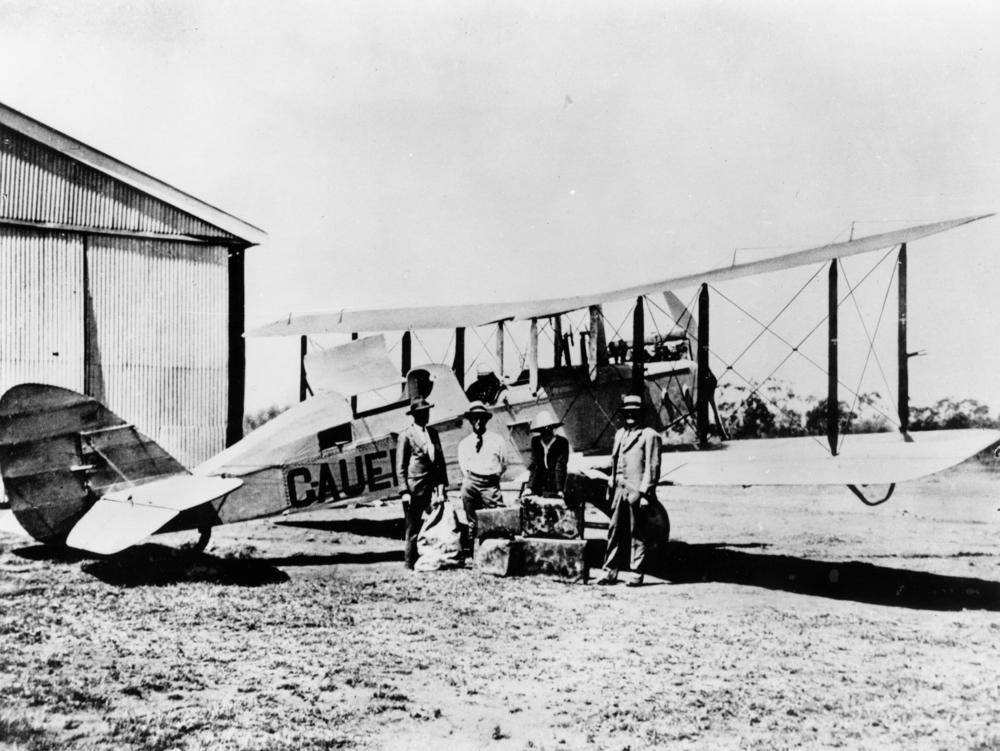
QANTAS biplane at Cloncurry, 1923 Airco de Havilland DH.9C G-AUEF was acquired by QANTAS in 1923 for the Charleville - Cloncurry route. Pilot, Captain G. Matthews is on the left and Mr. A. N. Templeton is on the right.

Cloncurry Airport has been the focal point for many of Australia's greatest innovations. Cloncurry was involved with the beginnings of QANTAS, and the original QANTAS hangar is still in use at the aerodrome, where "Queensland and Northern Territory Aerial Service" is still displayed above the hangar door.

The Royal Flying Doctor Service was founded there in 1928, now recognised the world over. The airport was also on route for early planes coming from overseas and a stopping place for contestants in the great air races of 1919 and 1934.

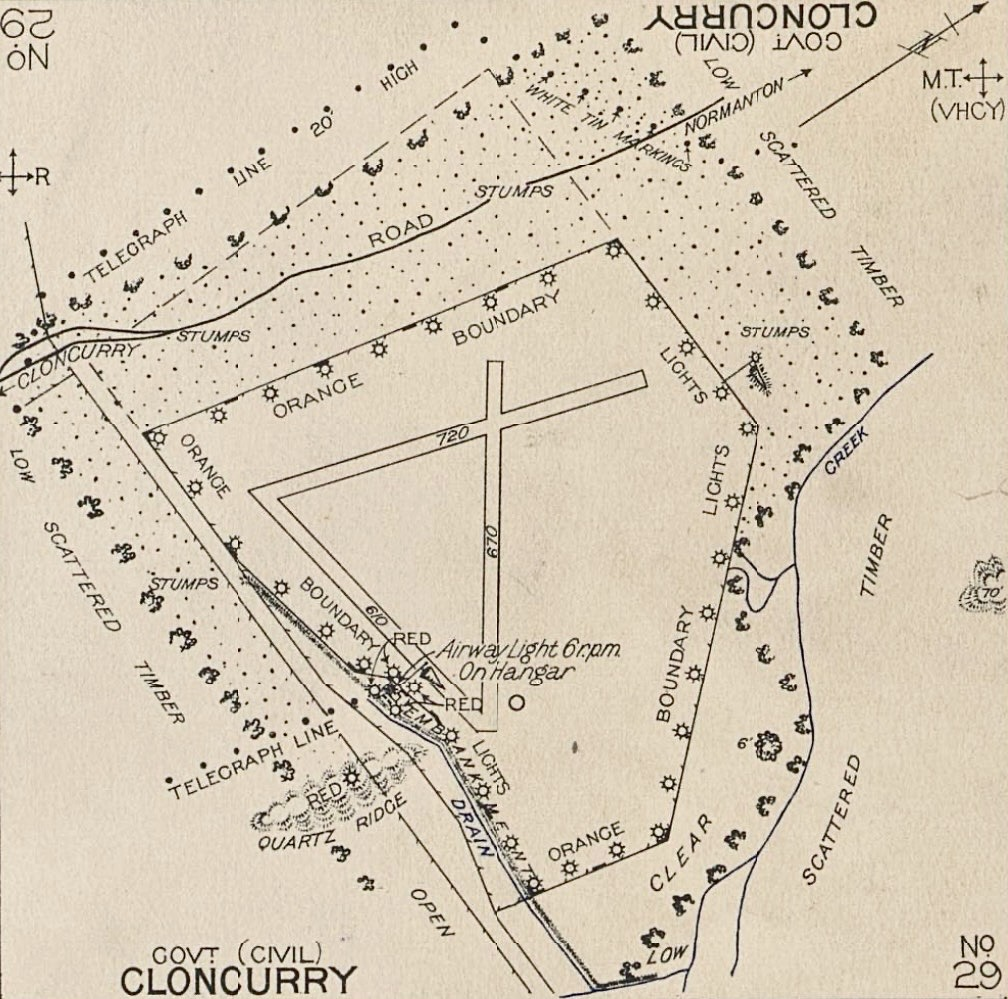
A map of Cloncurry Aerodrome from May 1939.

In the late 1930s (as early as 1938, as late as 1941), the KNILM service from Batavia (Jakarta) to Sydney, connecting at Batavia from Amsterdam on KLM, called at Cloncurry. On the way South, passengers spent the night, while on the way North, they had a luncheon in Cloncurry.

In early 2022, Horizon Airways established a base in Cloncurry providing flight training for all initial and advanced training, as well as fixed wing charter flight services.

=== World War II ===
Due to the strategic importance of Cloncurry aerodrome on the main Darwin–Sydney air route, the Royal Australian Air Force expanded the aerodrome during World War II. Intended to be a major airbase should the Empire of Japan have occupied New Guinea and Papua.

During the Second World War, Cloncurry Airport was the site of a major United States Army Air Forces air base in 1942. As the war moved north, the USAAF units located north to forward bases.

==== List of wartime military units based at Cloncurry Aerodrome ====
- No. 29 Operational Base Unit RAAF - 22 June 1942 – 5 July 1943
- No. 30 Operational Base Unit RAAF - 12 December 1942 – 19 September 1946
- No. 107 Radar Station RAAF - 1 June 1942 – 11 September 1942
- No. 108 Radar Station RAAF - 1 June 1942 – 11 September 1942
- USAAF 19th Bombardment Group B-17 Flying Fortress

HQ 19th Bomb Group assigned to Essendon Airport, Melbourne, Victoria

28th Bombardment Squadron, (28 March-5 May 1942)

Detachment operated from: Perth Airport, Perth, Western Australia, (28 March-18 May 1942)

30th Bombardment Squadron, (24 March-13 May 1942)
93d Bombardment Squadron, (29 March-18 May 1942)

== Airlines and destinations ==
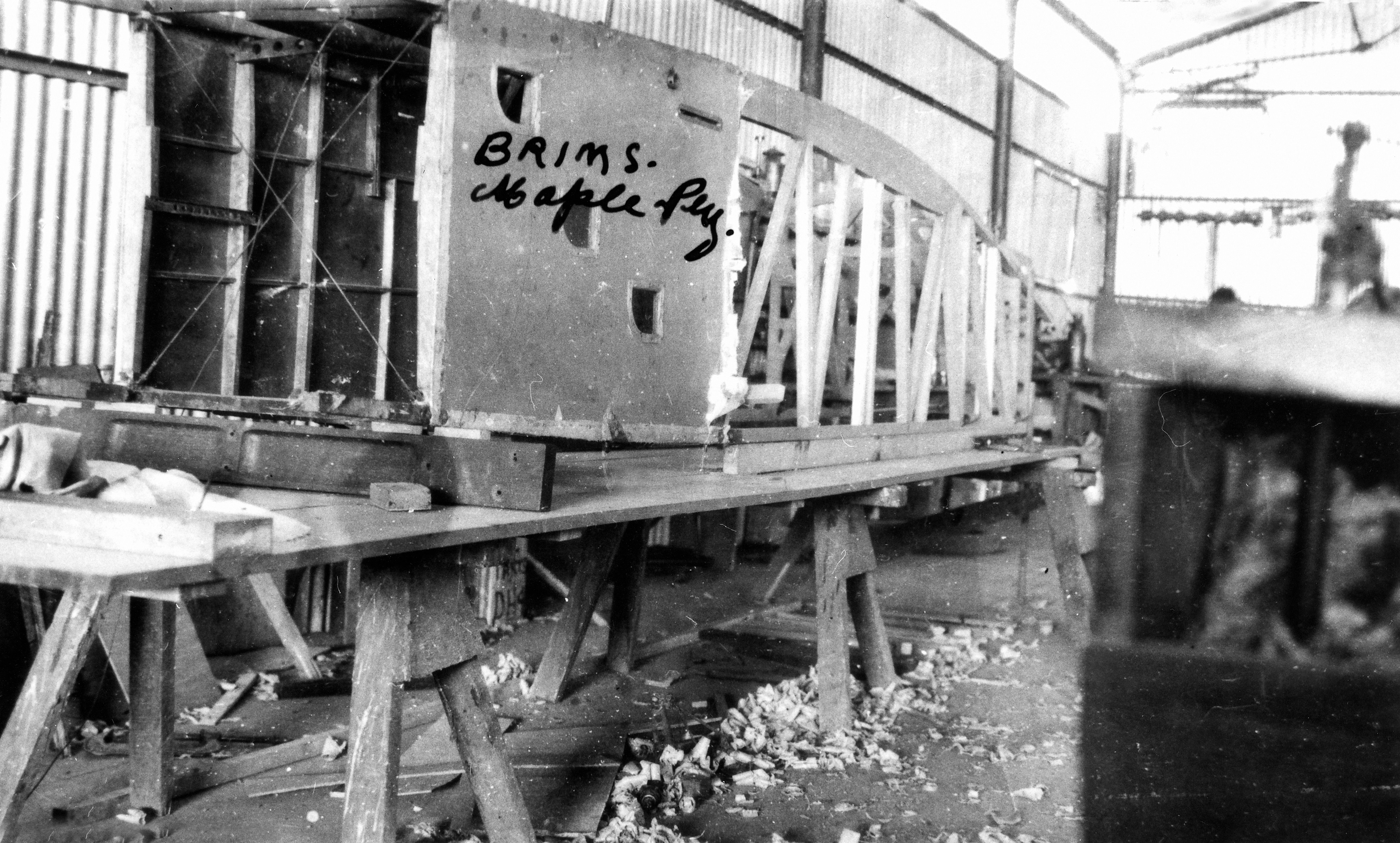
Aeroplane fuselage under construction, Cloncurry, ca. 1927 Brims Brothers Plywood Factory made the plywood which was used for construction of the aeroplane bodies by Qantas airways in the 1920s.

Airlines	Destinations
Alliance Airlines	Brisbane, Townsville; Mining charter: Cairns
QantasLink	Mount Isa, Townsville

== See also ==
- United States Army Air Forces in Australia (World War II)
- List of airports in Queensland
