= 28th Bomb Squadron =

Military unit of the United States Air Force

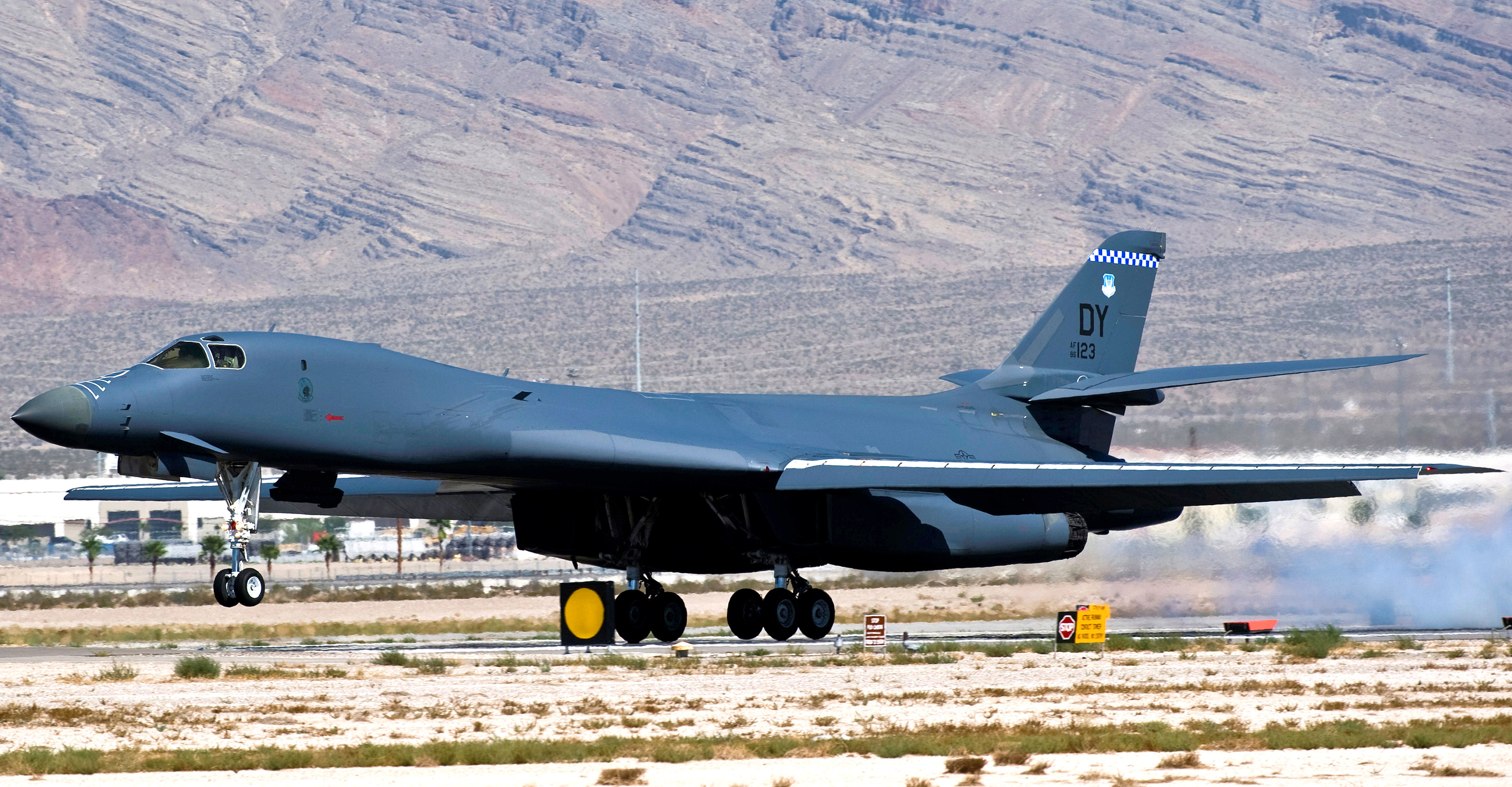
- 28th Bomb Squadron Rockwell B-1B Lancer< (Note: Aircraft is Rockwell B-1B Lancer, Lot V, serial 86-0123.)
- Active: 1917–1919; 1921–1922; 1922–1944; 1944–1983; 1987–present
- Country: United States
- Branch: United States Air Force
- Type: Squadron
- Role: Bombardment, formerly pursuit
- Part of: 7th Bomb Wing
- Garrison/HQ: Dyess Air Force Base, Texas
- Engagements: World War I Southwest Pacific Theater; Korean War
- Decorations: Distinguished Unit Citation (9x); Air Force Outstanding Unit Award (6x); Philippine Presidential Unit Citation; Republic of Korea Presidential Unit Citation

Commanders
- Current commander: Lt Col Brian R. Guyette

Insignia
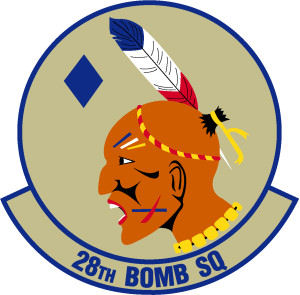
- 28th Bomb Squadron emblem (Note: Approved 26 March 1996.)

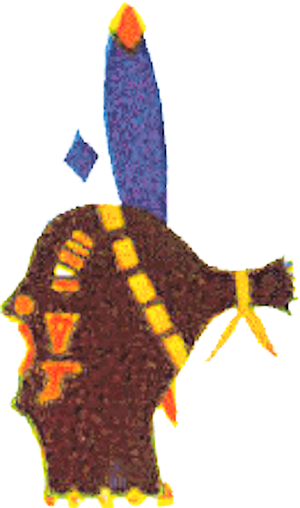
- 28th Aero Squadron emblem (Note: Approved by AEF 18 November 1918.) (Note: approved 14 February 1924 for 28th Bombardment Squadron.))
- Tail code: DY

Aircraft flown
- Bomber: Rockwell B-1B Lancer

The 28th Bomb Squadron is a squadron of the United States Air Force. It is assigned to the 7th Operations Group, Global Strike Command, stationed at Dyess Air Force Base, Texas. The squadron is equipped with the Rockwell B-1B Lancer.

The 28th is one of the oldest and most decorated units in the United States Air Force, being organized as the 28th Aero Squadron on 22 June 1917 at Camp Kelly, Texas. The squadron deployed to France and fought on the Western Front during World War I as a pursuit squadron. The unit was demobilized after the war in 1919.

Organized in 1921 as the 28th Squadron (Bombardment) in the permanent United States Army Air Service, the squadron served in the Philippines during the Inter-War period, engaging in combat during the 1941–42 Battle of the Philippines at the beginning of World War II. Withdrawn to Australia, it fought in the Dutch East Indies campaign before returning to the United States and being re-equipped with Boeing B-29 Superfortress bombers. It returned to the Pacific Theater of Operations in early 1945 to carry out strategic bombing missions over the Japanese Home Islands.

It carried out B-29 bombardment missions over North Korea during the Korean War. During the Cold War, it served as a Boeing B-47 Stratojet and Boeing B-52 Stratofortress squadron as part of Strategic Air Command.

== Mission ==
The 28th flies the Rockwell B-1B Lancer intercontinental strategic bomber. It is the largest bomb squadron in the Air Force. The squadron's mission is to provide all B-1 initial qualification, requalification, and instructor upgrade training for Global Strike Command.

== History ==
=== World War I ===
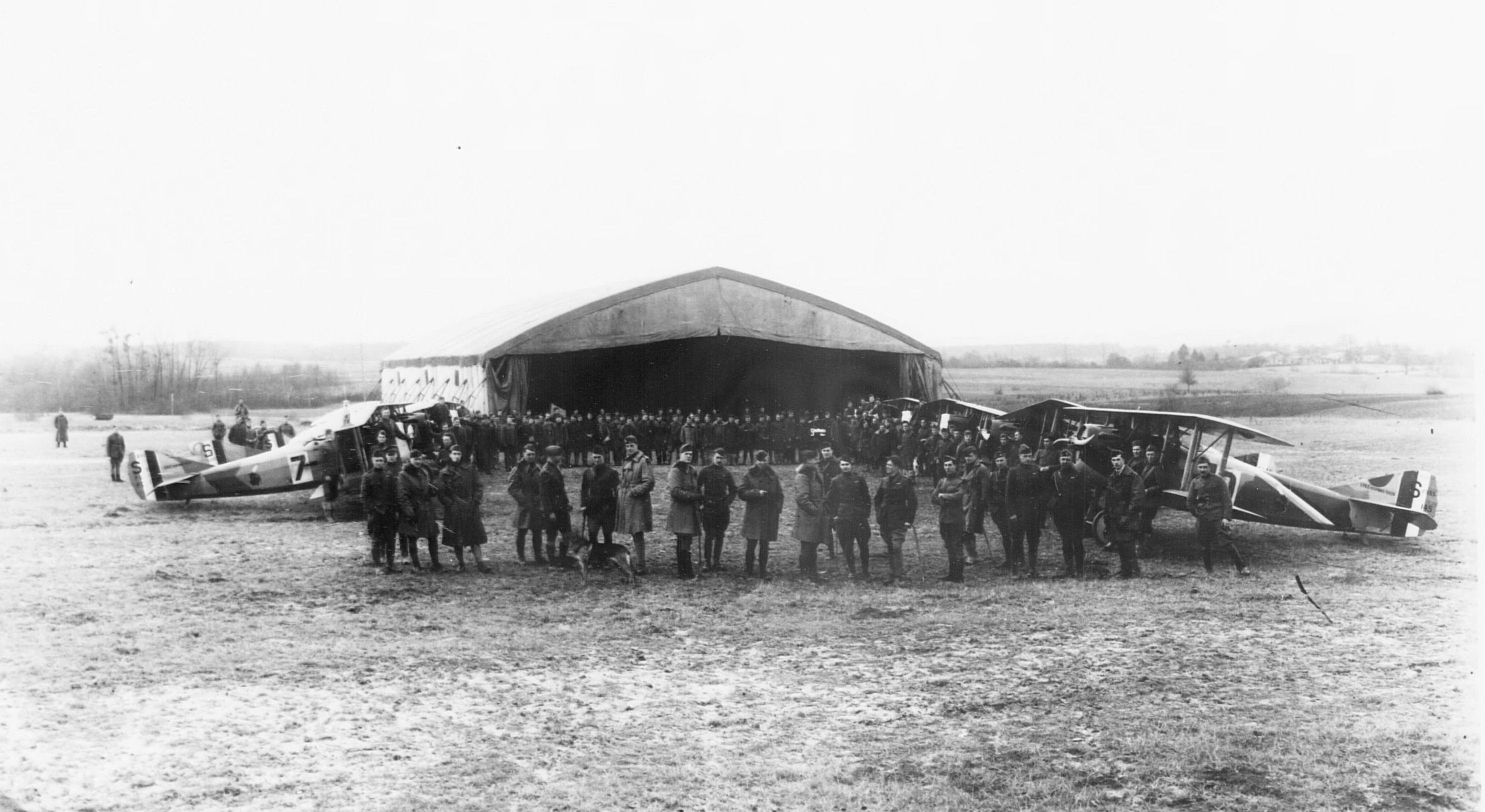
28th Aero Squadron, unit photograph, Foucaucourt Airdrome, France, 18 November 1918

Established in 1917 as the 28th Aero Squadron after the United States' entry into World War I. Formed at Camp Kelly, Texas, then sent to Quebec for combat flying training with units of the Royal Flying Corps. Deployed on the RMS Olympic to the Western Front in France and served with the British Second and American Fifth Armies from 20 March until c. 24 June 1918 (C flight participated in Somme Defense from 21 March to 6 April 1918). The 28th also saw combat as a pursuit unit with the First United States Army from 2 September 1918 until 10 November 1918. The squadron returned from France in June 1919 and was demobilized. During World War I, it had two aces in its ranks, Martinus Stenseth and Thomas Cassady.

=== Inter-war years ===
After World War I, the 28th Squadron (Bombardment), was constituted as a new unit on 30 August 1921. It was organized on 20 September at Mather Field, California and assigned to the Ninth Corps Area. The squadron was equipped with Dayton-Wright DH-4s and was used for aerial forest fire patrols along the western side of the Sierra Mountains and Sacramento, California area. On 19 January 1922, it was consolidated with its World War I predecessor unit, the 28th Aero Squadron, giving it a history dating to 22 June 1917. The unit was inactivated on 28 June 1922 with the closure of Mather Field.

The squadron was reactivated on 1 September 1922 at Clark Field, Philippine Islands and assigned to the Philippine Department. It was moved to Kindley Field, on Corregidor Island and again equipped with DH-4s. Assigned to the 4th Group (Composite) (later 4th Composite Group), the 28th was redesignated the 28th Bombardment Squadron on 25 January 1923. Along with the 2d Observation and 3d Pursuit Squadrons, the 28th provided the bombardment capability of the Air Service in the Philippines during the 1920s and 1930s. Its mission was tactical training for coastal defense. Exercises and maneuvers with Army ground forces and Naval forces were a regular and important part of its mission. The squadron was moved to the Manila area in 1922, operating from time to time from either Clark or Nichols Fields.

Along with the venerable DH-4, the 28th was equipped with the Martin NBS-1 bomber (also known as the MB-2) built during the final months of World War I. The MB-2 was the standard bomber of the Air Service throughout the 1920s, the squadron being upgraded to the Keystone LB-5 in 1929, then the Keystone B-3 in 1931. Also, the 28th flew the Loening OA-1 amphibian which it operated from Manila Bay. The obsolete Keystones were replaced by the Martin B-10 in 1937. In June 1938, the squadron moved to Clark Field.

As a result of the rising tensions with the Japanese Empire in 1940, the defenses of the Philippines were judged to be abysmal, and a reinforcement effort was made to defend the islands against any Japanese aggression. The 28th Squadron received Douglas B-18 Bolos in early 1941, and later, some early-model Boeing B-17C Flying Fortresses. On 1 November, it was assigned to the incoming 19th Bombardment Group in a reorganization of the Far East Air Force (FEAF) assets in the Philippines. The 28th, however, was filled with new pilots fresh out of flight training that were sent to reinforce the Philippines. The incoming 19th Group used the 28th as a fourth squadron, deploying two of its squadrons (the 30th and 93d) from March Field, California to the Philippines between 16 October and 4 November 1941 with more modern B-17Es, and the 14th Bombardment Squadron, which had arrived in September as its third squadron. The 28th also had eighteen B-18s on the line at Clark.

By 1 December 1941, the 19th Bombardment Group had all four of its squadrons at Clark Field. It was decided to disperse the Group and move the 14th-or-30th and 93d squadrons south to Del Monte Field on Mindanao. Del Monte, however, was little more than a grass field cut out of a pineapple farm with no supporting hangars, supplies, shops or other infrastructure to support the bombers.

On 7 December, there were 35 B-17s in the Philippines, with the 19th and 14th Squadrons at Clark Field on Luzon with a total of 19 planes (B-17Ds and B-17Es), and two squadrons at Del Monte 500 miles to the south with the other 16 B-17Es. A fifth squadron, the 38th Reconnaissance Squadron with four B-17Cs and two new B-17Es was inbound from Hamilton Field, California to Pearl Harbor on their way to the Philippines to reinforce the American force there, and was expected to arrive in a week.

=== World War II ===
==== Battle of the Philippines ====
After the Pearl Harbor Attack on 7 December 1941 in Hawaii, Clark Field was put on alert for a Japanese attack. FEAF Commanding General Lewis H. Brereton sought permission from theater commander General Douglas MacArthur to conduct air raids against Japanese forces on Formosa, but was refused. It was a little before 0800 when Brereton returned to Air Headquarters at Nielson Field. As he entered his office he asked what decision the staff had reached, but on being told said, "No, We can't attack till we're fired on" and explained that he had been directed to prepare the B-17s for action but was not to undertake offensive action till ordered. Later, about 1100 on 8 December7 December in Hawaii was 8 December in the Philippines. a combat strike was approved by FEAF against Formosa.

Just as the B-17s were on the line, the Imperial Japanese Army Air Service attacked Clark Field and practically destroyed the Army Air Corps capability of conducting an offensive action against the enemy. Damage to the physical structures at Clark Field was immense. This included the barracks which housed the personnel of the 28th. As a result, the entire squadron was ordered to bivouac in a nearby rifle pit. Confusion was the order of the day. A limited few were assigned to help repair and salvage parts of the remaining planes. There was very little for the remaining squadron personnel to do.

===== Infantry =====
With almost all of the squadron's aircraft destroyed at Clark, the men of the ground echelon were pressed into service as infantry under 5th Interceptor Command. On Christmas Eve of 1941, the 28th evacuated Clark Field and went by train to Bataan. The squadron was bivouacked approximately two miles east of Corregidor Island.

On 29 December, the 28th received orders to travel to the port of Mariveles. During its journey to the port, men of the squadron witnessed the Japanese air force attempting to bomb Corregidor. Arriving at the port of Mariveles, they were instructed to board the inter-island steamer, the Mayon. That evening, about 21:00 the ship sailed from the port. It traveled all night, and at daylight, anchored off the Island of Mindoro in an attempt to keep away from the enemy naval forces.

However, that area was not a sanctuary, inasmuch as a Japanese patrol bomber spotted the Mayon and attempted to bomb it. The plane dropped six bombs without making a serious hit on the ship. At nightfall, the ship once again initiated its journey southward. The next morning, it anchored in a small cove for protection once again. There was an enormous amount of life preservers and debris on the water on this cove. It was later learned that the Japanese had sunk the sister ship of the Mayon, named the SS Panay, where the Mayon anchored. That night, the ship sailed once more and arrived at the port of Bago, Mindanao the next morning.

At Bago, the men of the 28th were issued some old British Lee–Enfield rifles fully coated with cosmoline. After cleaning their rifles, the men embarked on buses at Malaybalay and stayed overnight. The next day, the enlisted men of the 28th, along with a few officers, were transported further southward by bus to Carmen Ferry on the Pulangi River. They were approximately forty miles from the city of Davao, where the Japanese armed forces were entrenched. its orders were to guard the ferry and patrol the Pulangi River.

On 16 April 1942, the personnel of the 28th Bomb Squadron were ordered north to Maramag, Mindanao. Maramag was the planned site of a secret airfield which was hopefully to be used by FEAF. However, this part of the Philippine Islands defense plans were never fully developed due to enemy action. On 7 May 1942, most of the personnel of the 28th, along with servicemen from other Air Corps units of the 19th Group, were ordered to embark for an area in northern Mindanao known as Alanib. At Alanib, the entire group started on a twenty three kilometer hike to another area in the center of Mindanao named Bosok. This area was not accessible by truck. The group's assignment was to prepare entrenchments for Filipino troops to guard a back trail which could have permitted the Japanese armed forces on Mindanao. The American force, having reached approximately one kilometer from its destination of Bosok, was ambushed by a Japanese patrol. The infiltration had already begun. Fortunately, there were few casualties during the encounter. However, having only shovels and no weapons, the entire force proceeded to backtrack toward Alanib, the embarkation point. The Japanese patrol was in hot pursuit. However, there were U.S. Army trucks at Alanib when the men arrived. The drivers of the trucks informed the men of the 28th that all of the American armed forces in the Philippine Islands had been ordered to surrender as of that day.

At Alanib, the ground echelon of the 28th Bombardment Squadron surrendered to the Japanese as ordered on 10 May 1942, although some presumably joined guerrilla forces and continued fighting as unorganized resistance during the Japanese Occupation. The trucks transported the men of the 28th to Maramag and then to a prisoner of war camp at Malaybaly, Mindanao. After their surrender, a number of the 28th personnel died in Japanese Prisoner of war camps and on the Japanese Hell ships en route to Japan.

===== Air echelon =====
The surviving squadron aircraft were sent to Del Monte Field on Mindanao, but were unable to operate effectively against the invading Japanese forces. From Del Monte, the few aircraft began reconnaissance and bombardment operations against Japanese shipping and landing parties until 17 December when badly in need of depot maintenance, the 28th began displacing south to Darwin, Australia. The air echelon of squadron retreated to Australia, reforming at Batchelor Airfield near Darwin, Northern Territory.

Squadron deployed aircraft from Australia to Java in January 1942 to support Allied forces during the Dutch East Indies Campaign, carrying out bombing missions against the advancing Japanese forces. Allied withdraw from Java forced squadron to return to Australia in March.

In Australia, squadron was reformed as part of Fifth Air Force, receiving aircraft and crews from the United States which had arrived in Australia after the Pearl Harbor Attack. Flew combination of B-17C/D/E aircraft; participated in the Battle of the Coral Sea in May 1942, and raided enemy transportation and communications targets as well as troop concentrations during the Japanese invasion of Papua New Guinea. The squadron bombed enemy airdromes, ground installations, and shipping near Rabaul, New Britain in August 1942.

By late 1942, the USAAF decided that no more B-17s would be sent to the Pacific, and that units would be withdrawn or re-equipped in the Pacific in favor of the longer-ranged Consolidated B-24 Liberator. In addition, the combat losses by Eighth Air Force in Europe were reaching such magnitude that the entire B-17 production was urgently needed for replacements and training in that theater.

Leaving its remaining B-17 aircraft in Australia, squadron personnel returned to the United States in December 1942. The men of the 28th Squadron distinguished themselves during the Battle of the Philippines and the Dutch East Indies campaign by severely disrupting the timetable of the Japanese armed forces in conquering Southeast Asia. This gave the United States government and its Allies sufficient time to arm Australia, halt the Japanese advance in Southeast Asia, and then proceed with the task of winning the war.

==== B-29 Superfortress operations against Japan ====
Reformed as a B-17 heavy bomber Replacement Training Unit assigned to Second Air Force in Texas. The squadron conducted replacement training from 1 February 1943 until 1 April 1944, when it was inactivated. Shortly before inactivation, the squadron was designated the 28th Bombardment Squadron, Very Heavy.

The squadron was activated the same day as a Boeing B-29 Superfortress very heavy bombardment squadron. When training was completed moved to North Field (Guam) in the Mariana Islands of the Central Pacific Area in January 1945 and assigned to XXI Bomber Command, Twentieth Air Force. Its mission was the strategic bombardment of the Japanese Home Islands and the destruction of its war-making capability.

Flew "shakedown" missions against Japanese targets on Moen Island, Truk, and other points in the Carolines and Marianas. The squadron began combat missions over Japan on 25 February 1945 with a firebombing mission over Northeast Tokyo. The squadron continued to participate in wide area firebombing attack, but the first ten-day blitz resulting in the Army Air Forces running out of incendiary bombs. Until then the squadron flew conventional strategic bombing missions using high explosive bombs.

The squadron continued attacking urban areas until the end of the war in August 1945, its subordinate units conducted raids against strategic objectives, bombing aircraft factories, chemical plants, oil refineries, and other targets in Japan. The squadron flew its last combat missions on 14 August when hostilities ended. Afterwards, its B 29s carried relief supplies to Allied prisoner of war camps in Japan and Manchuria

Remained on Guam after the war conducted sea-search, photographic mapping, and training missions in the western Pacific.

Deployed to Kadena Air Base, Okinawa in June 1950 as a result of the Korean War. Flew strategic bombing missions over North Korea; targets included an oil refinery and port facilities at Wonsan, a railroad bridge at Pyongyang, and Yonpo Airfield. After United Nations ground forces pushed the communists out of South Korea, the squadron turned to strategic objectives in North Korea, including industrial and hydroelectric facilities. It also continued to attack bridges, marshalling yards, supply centers, artillery and troop positions, barracks, port facilities, and airfields.

Continued bombardment operations until the June 1953 armistice in Korea; returned to the United States in May 1954; the squadrons B-29s being sent to reclamation.

=== Strategic Air Command ===
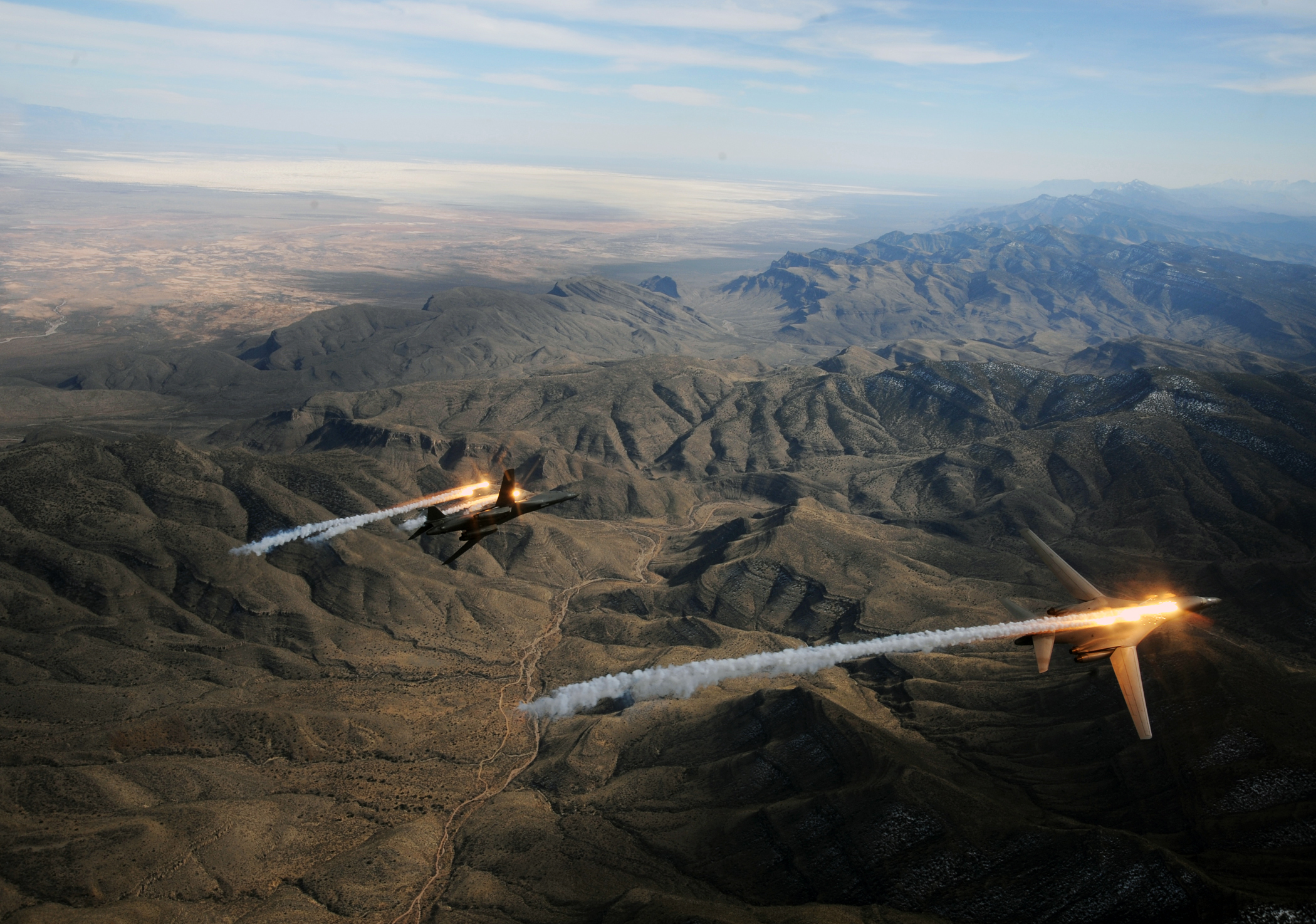
28th Bomb Squadron B-1B Lancers release chaff and flares while maneuvering during a training mission 24 February 2010

Reactivated in May 1954 with new Boeing B-47 Stratojet medium bombers and personnel at Pinecastle Air Force Base, near Orlando, Florida under Strategic Air Command (SAC). Engaged in training operations and participated in numerous SAC exercises and deployments with the B-47 until 1961 when the B-47s began to be phased out of SAC. Re-equipped with Boeing B-52H Stratofortresses in 1962 at Homestead Air Force Base, Florida. Flew intercontinental training missions with the Stratofortress, and maintained nuclear alert. Re-equipped with B-52G model in 1968 and moved to Robins Air Force Base. Deployed personnel and aircraft several times to forward bases in the Western Pacific, carrying out combat missions over Indochina under Operation Arc Light, Operation Linebacker I and the Linebacker II raids of 1972–73 at the end of the Vietnam War. Squadron reformed at Robins in 1973 and returned to nuclear alert status. Inactivated in 1983 as part of the phaseout of the B-52G from the SAC inventory.

Reactivated in 1987 and re-equipped with the Rockwell B-1B Lancer strategic bomber. Stationed initially at McConnell Air Force Base, Kansas, the squadron moved to Dyess Air Force Base, Texas in 1994 and transferred to the 7th Wing when McConnell was realigned as a tanker base. Currently, the 28th conducts weapons system training for B-1 crews. Each year, it trains more than 200 active duty crewmembers.

== Lineage ==
28th Aero Squadron

- Organized as the 28th Aero Squadron on 22 June 1917

Redesignated 28th Aero Squadron (Pursuit) on 15 July 1918
Demobilized on 16 June 1919
Reconstituted and consolidated with the 28th Squadron (Bombardment) as the 28th Squadron (Bombardment) on 9 January 1922

28th Bomb Squadron

- Authorized as the 22d Squadron (Bombardment) on 30 August 1921

Organized on 20 September 1921
Consolidated with the 28th Aero Squadron on 9 January 1922
Inactivated on 28 June 1922

- Activated on 1 September 1922

Redesignated 28th Bombardment Squadron on 25 January 1923
Redesignated 28th Bombardment Squadron (Medium) on 6 December 1939
Redesignated 28th Bombardment Squadron (Heavy) on 16 November 1941
Redesignated 28th Bombardment Squadron, Very Heavy on 28 March 1944
Inactivated on 1 April 1944

- Activated on 1 April 1944

Redesignated 28th Bombardment Squadron, Medium on 10 August 1948
Redesignated 28th Bombardment Squadron, Heavy on 1 July 1961
Inactivated on 1 October 1983

- Activated on 1 July 1987

Redesignated 28th Bomb Squadron on 1 September 1991

=== Assignments ===
- Post Headquarters, Kelly Field, 22 June 1917
- Aviation Section, U.S. Signal Corps, 22 August 1917 (attached to the Royal Flying Corps)
- Aviation Concentration Center, 26 January-5 March 1918
- Air Service Headquarters, AEF, British Isles (attached to: Royal Flying Corps for training, 19 March-24 June 1918)
- 3d Aviation Instruction Center, 24 June 1918
- Air Service Acceptance Park No. 1, 8 July 1918
- 3d Pursuit Group, 15 July 1918 (Note: Maurer and Robertson say August 1918.)
- 2d Pursuit Group, 6 November 1918 (Note: Maurer and Robertson say December 1918.)
- 1st Air Depot, AEF, 15 April-4 May 1919
- Advanced Section Services of Supply, 2 May-1 June 1919
- Post Headquarters, Hazelhurst Field, 15–17 June 1919
- Ninth Corps Area, 20 September 1921 – 28 June 1922
- Philippine Department, 1 September 1922
- 4th Group (Composite) (later 4th Composite Group), 2 December 1922
- 19th Bombardment Group, 16 November 1941 – 1 April 1944 (ground echelon attached to 5th Interceptor Command, c. 24 December 1941 – May 1942)
- 19th Bombardment Group, 1 April 1944
- 19th Bombardment Wing, 1 June 1953 – 1 October 1983
- 384th Bombardment Wing, 1 July 1987
- 384th Operations Group, 1 September 1991
- 384th Bomb Group, 1 January 1994
- 7th Operations Group, 1 October 1994 – present

=== Stations ===
- Camp Kelly (later Kelly Field), Texas, 22 June 1917
- Toronto, Ontario, Canada, 25 August 1917

Detachments at Deseronto, Ontario and Camp Borden, Ontario

- Deseronto, Canada, 1 September 1917
- Taliaferro Field No. 1, Texas, 5 November 1917
- Aviation Concentration Center, Garden City, New York, 25 January-25 February 1918
- Liverpool, England, 5 March 1918
- Romsey, Hampshire, England, 6 March 1918
- Le Havre, France, 19 March 1918
- St Marie-Cappel, France, 20 March 1918
- Hazebrouck Airdrome, France, 20 March 1918

Ground Echelon separated into Flights for support training with RAF

Headquarters and "A" Flight

- Attached to: No. 57 Squadron RAF
- Attached to: No. 20 Squadron RAF 1–12 April 1918
- Attached to: No. 206 Squadron RAF 12 April-5 June 1918
- Attached to: No. 25 Squadron RAF
- Sainte-Marie-Cappel Airdrome, Nord-Pas-de-Calais, 21 March-1 April 1918
- Boisdinghem, France, 13 April 1918
- Alquines, France, 15 April 1918

Ruisseauville Airdrome, Nord-Pas-de-Calais, 5–23 June 1918

"B" Flight

- Attached to: No. 28 Squadron RAF

Triozinnes Airdrome, Nord-Pas-de-Calais, 21 March-7 April 1918

- Attached to: No. 40 Squadron RAF 7 April-23 June 1918 (undermined location)

"C" Flight

- Attached to: No. 25 Squadron RAF

Villers-Bretonneux Airdrome, Picardy, 20–25 March 1918
Hazebrouck Airdrome, Nord-Pas-de-Calais, 25 March-8 April 1918
Ruisseauville Airdrome, Nord-Pas-de-Calais, 8 April-23 June 1918

- Saint-Omer Aerodrome, Nord-Pas-de-Calais, 24 June 1918
- Issoudun Aerodrome, Centre, 26 June 1918
- Orly Airport, Paris, 8 July 1918
- Gengault Aerodrome, Toul, 15 July 1918
- Vaucouleurs Aerodrome, Lorraine, 16 August 1918
- Lisle-en-Barrois Aerodrome, Lorraine, 20 September 1918
- Foucaucourt Aerodrome, Lorraine, 6 November 1918
- Grand Airdrome, 15 February 1919
- Colombey-les-Belles Airdrome, 15 April 1919
- Le Mans, France, 4–19 May 1919
- Mitchel Field, New York, 31 May-16 Jun 1919
- Mather Field, California, 20 September 1921 – 28 June 1922
- Clark Field, Luzon, Philippines, 1 September 1922
- Kindley Field, Corregidor, Philippines, Sep 1922
- Nichols Field, Luzon, Philippines, Nov 1922
- Clark Field, Luzon, Philippines, Dec 1922
- Nichols Field, Luzon, Philippines, 4 June 1923
- Clark Field, Luzon, Philippines, 16 June 1938
- Batchelor Airfield, Australia, c. 24 December 1941

Ground echelon in Luzon and Mindanao, Philippines, c. 24 December 1941 – May 1942

- Singosari, Java, Netherlands East Indies, 30 December 1941
- Essendon Airport, Melbourne, Australia, c. 4 March 1942
- Cloncurry Airport, Australia, c. 28 March 1942

Detachment operated from Perth Airport, Australia, c. 28 Mar-18 May 1942

- Longreach Airport, Australia, c. 5 May 1942
- Mareeba Airfield, Australia, 24 Jul-c. 18 November 1942
- Pocatello Army Air Field, Idaho, c. 30 December 1942
- Pyote Army Air Base, Texas, 24 January 1943 – 1 April 1944
- Great Bend Army Air Field, Kansas, 1 Apr-8 Dec 1944
- North Field, Guam, Mariana Islands, 16 January 1945
- Kadena AB, Okinawa, 27 June 1950 – 14 May 1954
- Pinecastle Air Force Base, Florida, c. 28 May 1954
- Homestead Air Force Base, Florida, c. 25 June 1956
- Robins Air Force Base, Georgia, 25 July 1968 – 1 October 1983
- McConnell Air Force Base, Kansas, 1 July 1987
- Dyess Air Force Base, Texas, 1 October 1994 – present

=== Aircraft ===
- Curtiss JN-4, 1917
- SPAD S.XIII, 1918–1919
- SPAD S.VII, 1918–1919
- Dayton-Wright DH-4, 1921–1922, 1922 – c. 1928
- Martin NBS–1, 1924–1930
- Keystone LB-5, 1929–1931
- Loening OA-1, 1929–1931
- Keystone B-3, 1931–1937
- Martin B-10, 1937–1941
- Douglas B-18 Bolo, 1941
- Boeing B-17 Flying Fortress, 1941–1944
- Consolidated LB-30, 1941–1942
- Consolidated B-24 Liberator, 1941–1942
- Boeing B-29 Superfortress, 1944–1954
- Boeing B-47 Stratojet, 1954–1961
- Boeing B-52 Stratofortress, 1962–1983
- Rockwell B-1 Lancer, 1988 – present

== See also ==
- List of American aero squadrons
- List of B-52 Units of the United States Air Force
- List of B-47 units of the United States Air Force
- List of B-29 Superfortress operators
- United States Army Air Forces in Australia
