= 30th Bombardment Squadron =

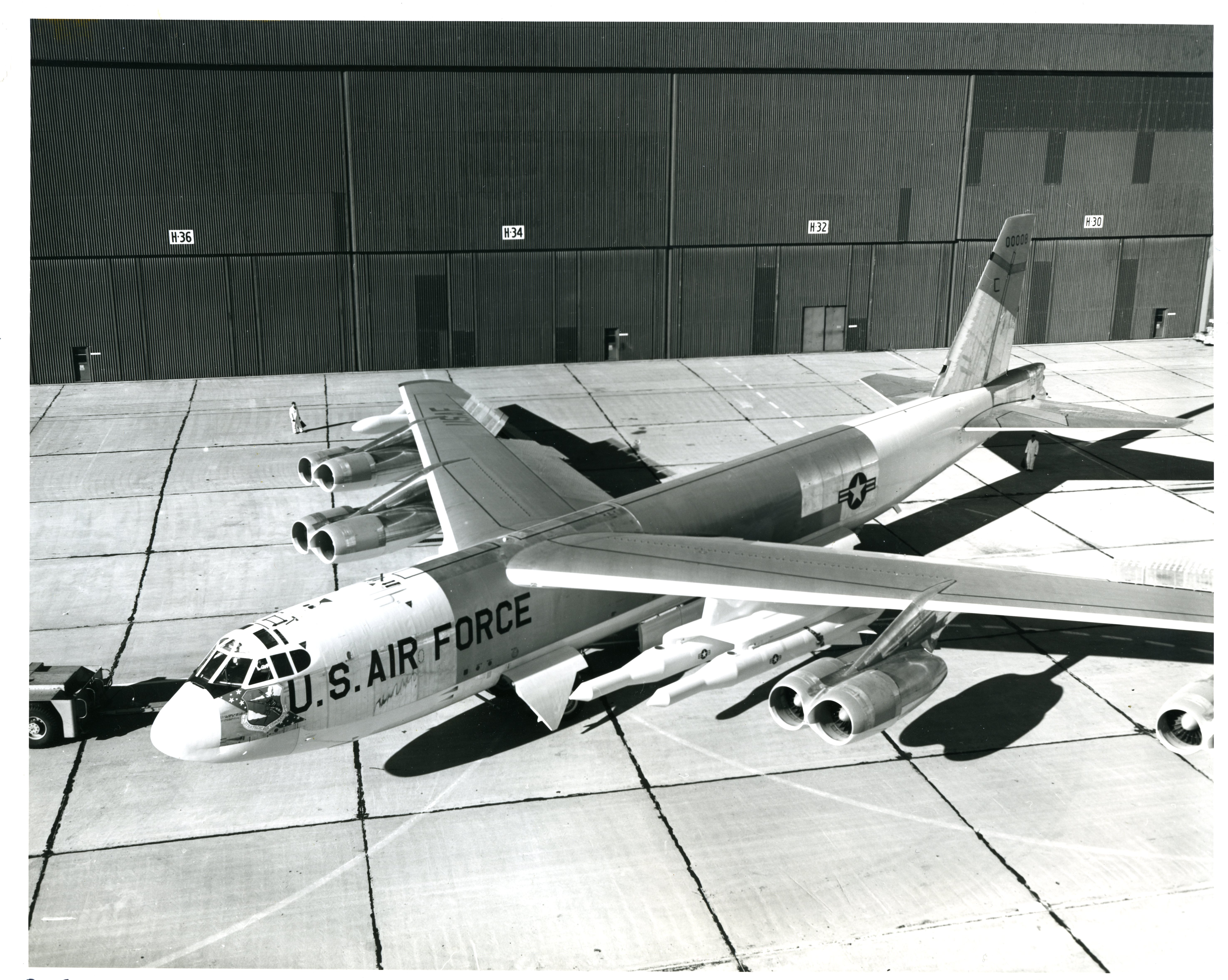
- B-52H Stratofortress in SAC nuclear markings as flown by the squadron
- Active: 1917–1919; 1932–1944; 1944–1963
- Country: United States
- Branch: United States Air Force
- Role: Bombardment
- Engagements: World War I; Southwest Pacific Theater; Korean War
- Decorations: Distinguished Unit Citation; Philippine Presidential Unit Citation; Republic of Korea Presidential Unit Citation

Insignia
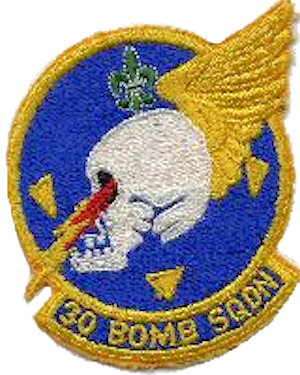
- Patch with 30th Bombardment Squadron emblem (Note: Approved 8 September 1953.)

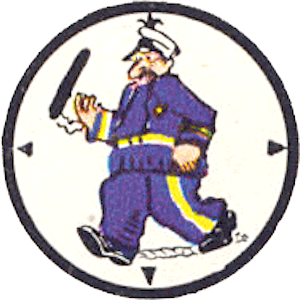
- 30th Bombardment Squadron emblem (Note: Approved 9 January 1933.)

See United States Air Force Thunderbirds for the squadron's successor unit

The 30th Bombardment Squadron is a United States Air Force unit. On 19 September 1985 it was consolidated with the USAF Air Demonstration Squadron, also known as the United States Air Force Thunderbirds. The squadron was first activated in 1917 when the United States entered World War I as the 30th Aero Squadron. It deployed to France in the fall of 1917 and served as a construction unit throughout the war, returning to the United States at the end of 1918 for demobilization. It was reconstituted as the 30th Bombardment Squadron in March 1923 and served with reserve personnel during the decade. In 1932, the squadron became a regular unit, serving at bases in California.

The squadron, which had equipped with early models of the Boeing B-17 Flying Fortress, deployed to the Philippines in the fall of 1941 to reinforce the American garrison there. The squadron's base at Clark Field was attacked on 8 December 1941. During the month of December, the squadron withdrew through the Philippines to Darwin, Australia, although it continued to stage through Philippine bases through the spring of 1942. In late 1942, the squadron was withdrawn from combat and reformed as an Operational Training Unit. In April 1944, the squadron began training with Boeing B-29 Superfortresses and deployed again to the Pacific, where it participated in the strategic bombing campaign against Japan until the end of the war.

Following V-J Day, the squadron remained on Guam until the outbreak of the Korean War, when it moved to Okinawa to reinforce the bomber forces of Far East Air Forces. In 1954, after the armistice that ended hostilities in Korea, the squadron returned to the United States, where it became an element of Strategic Air Command (SAC), flying Boeing B-47 Stratojets, then Boeing B-52 Stratofortresses. When SAC dispersed its B-52 force to reduce vulnerability to Soviet missile attack, the squadron moved to Grand Forks Air Force Base, North Dakota as part of the 4133d Strategic Wing. It was inactivated on 1 February 1963, when SAC discontinued its MAJCON combat wings and their subordinate units and replaced them with wings that could continue their histories.

== History ==
=== World War I ===
==== Organization and deployment to France ====
The squadron's history dates to 13 June 1917 when the 30th Aero Squadron was organized at Camp Kelly (later Kelly Field, Texas, less than a month after the United States' entry into World War I. Most of the men of the squadron arrived at Kelly Field when it was nothing but a sand heap and a few tents and their first job was to dig trenches around the field for water and utility lines. The men received their indoctrination into the Army as soldiers, standing guard duty and other rudimentary duties. The lack of sanitary facilities and uniforms meant most men worked in the civilian clothing they arrived in and slept in them without bathing until latrines and washing facilities were constructed.

On 11 August 1917, the squadron received orders for overseas duty, and it traveled by train to Fort Totten, New York in preparation for service in France. On 22 August they were transported to the port of embarkation at Hoboken, New Jersey, and boarded the RMS Baltic. The next day, they left for Halifax, Nova Scotia where the Baltic anchored awaiting for a convoy. On 5 September, the convoy was formed and the trans-Atlantic journey began.

On the night of 14 September, an accompanying destroyer spotted a submarine periscope and fired two red rockets as a warning. As the destroyer dropped depth charges, the Baltic made a sudden turn to port that caused both men and anything loose aboard the ship to move. A large explosion was heard and everyone on board was ordered to report to their assigned lifeboats. A torpedo had struck the ship, but it had only made a glancing blow on the bow. The ship's emergency pumps were working and there was no danger.

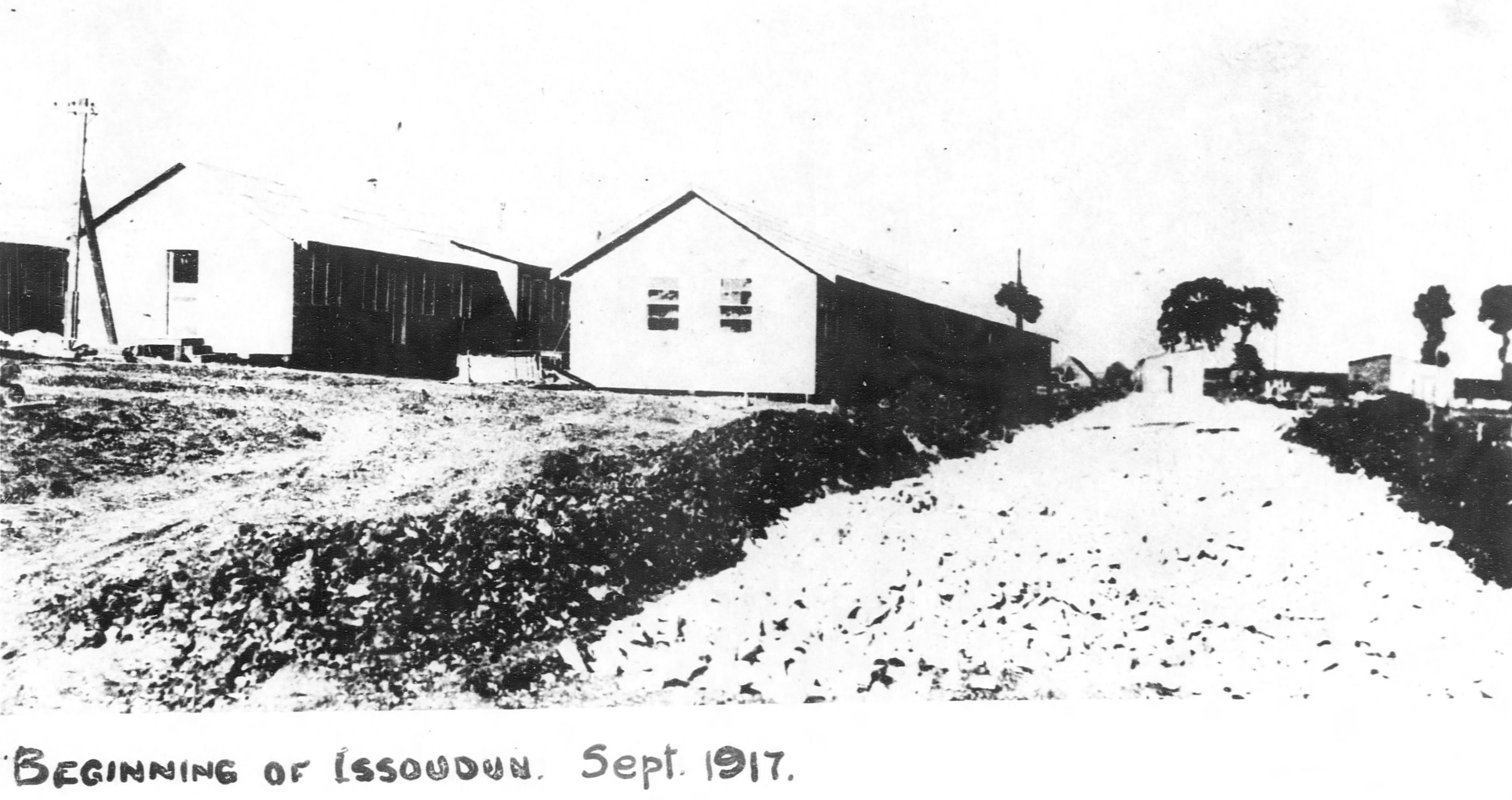
Issodun Aerodrome, France, September 1917

The next morning the ship arrived at Liverpool, England, the squadrons on the Baltic being the first American airmen to land there. The 30th boarded a train to Southampton, where it was stationed at a rest camp. At Southampton, fifty men of the squadron were detached to the Royal Flying Corps for three months training as aircraft mechanics. The remainder of the squadron proceeded to France. The squadron arrived at Le Havre, then continued by train to the Etampes aerodrome, France, arriving on the 18th. At Étampes, ten more men of the squadron were taken out and sent to Lyons, where they took a ten-week course in Le Rhone and Hispano-Suiza aircraft engines.

==== Third Aviation Instruction Center ====
On 23 September, the remainder of the squadron moved to Issoudun Aerodrome, France, for the construction of an American school and several airfields. What became the Third Aviation Instruction Center would be the largest airfield in the world at the time, its mission was to train American pursuit pilots to enter combat over the front against German aviators. As was the case at Kelly Field earlier, the men went to work in various construction tasks, and were joined by several other squadrons in their work. A power grid was installed along with various water and telephone lines. Streets were laid down and various wooden buildings were erected.

The squadron began to work on what was later the largest machine shops of the American Expeditionary Forces. The shop began as a simple hangar. As various equipment and specialized tools arrived the shop expanded until it could accommodate the large number of aircraft engines that were arriving. Members of the 30th Squadron worked in most of the shops of the school, assembling newly arrived aircraft, working on engines, machine guns and in the warehouses, stocking and receiving parts and other supplies. By the time of the Armistice on 11 November, the men of the squadron held responsible positions in many of the support areas of the center.

==== Demobilization ====
The 30th remained at Issodun until the end of December 1918 when orders were received to proceed to the 1st Air Depot at Colombey-les-Belles Airdrome, France. From Colombey, the squadron was moved to a staging camp under the Services of Supply at Bordeaux, France, in January waiting for a date to report to a base port for transportation home. In mid-March, the squadron boarded a troop ship, arriving in New York on 5 April. From there, the 30th moved to Mitchel Field, New York where the men were demobilized and returned to civilian life.

=== Inter-war years ===
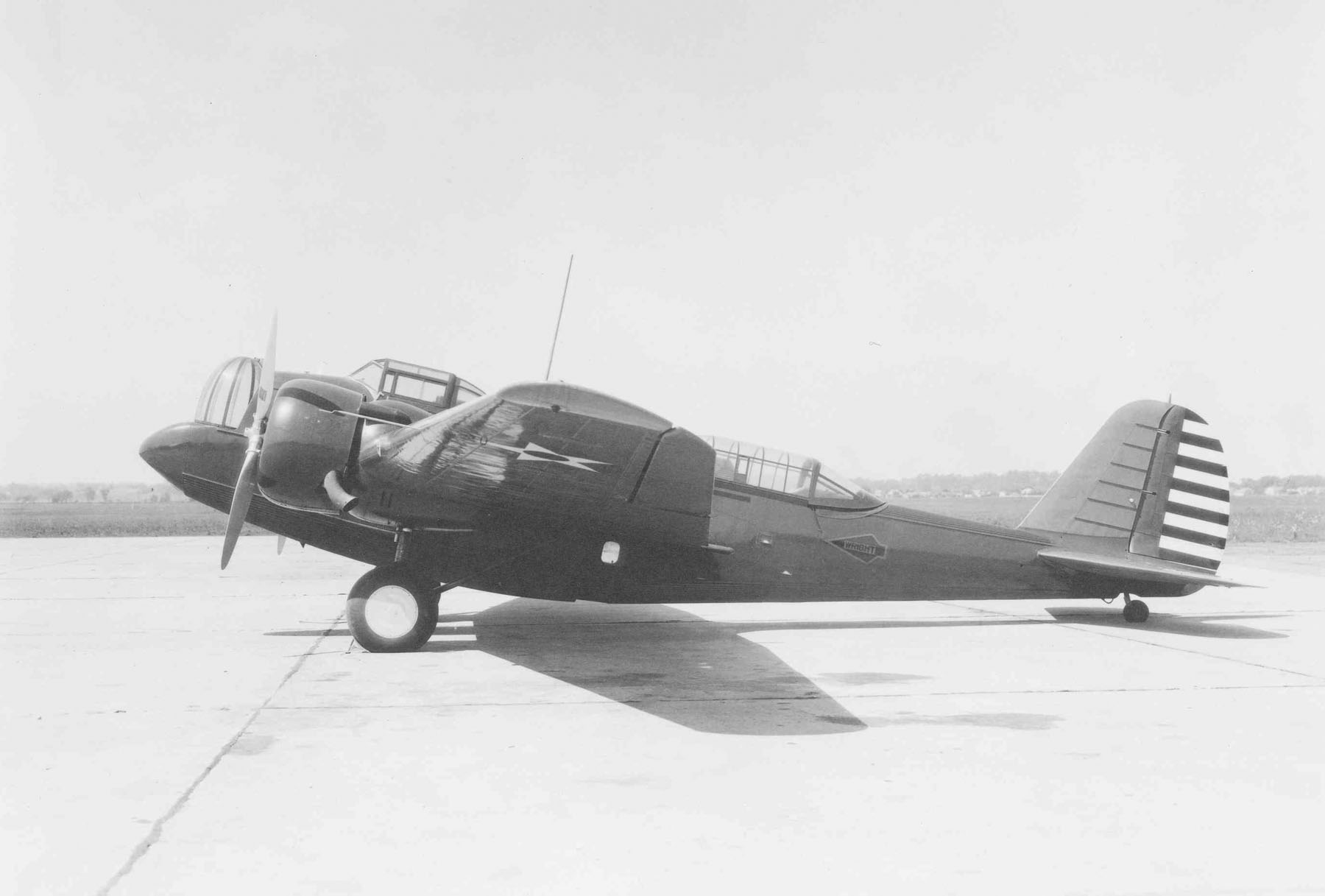
19th Bombardment Group Martin B-12 at March Field, California

The squadron was reconstituted as the 30th Bombardment Squadron on 24 March 1923 and assigned to the 7th Bombardment Group in inactive status. In June 1926, it was organized as a Regular Army Inactive (RAI) unit, (Note: Regular Army Inactive units were constituted in the regular army. Although they were not activated, they were organized with reserve personnel during the 1920s and early 1930s. Although they had reserve personnel assigned, they were not Organized Reserve units, and because they had no regular personnel they were considered inactive in the regular army. Clay, p. vi.) at Langley Field, Virginia, with its personnel serving as associates of the 20th Bombardment Squadron there. This organization lasted only a few months, and in February 1927, the reservists were withdrawn from the unit, and it was reassigned from Third Corps Area to Ninth Corps Area. On 15 January 1930, it was again organized as an RAI unit, training at Kelly Field.

On 24 June 1932 the reservists assigned to the squadron were withdrawn and it was activated at Rockwell Field, California and assigned to the 19th Bombardment Group. At Rockwell, the squadron was equipped with a variety of amphibious aircraft and light bombers. The squadron moved on 25 October 1935 to March Field, California when the Army and the Navy executed an agreement that transferred Rockwell and two other Army fields to the Navy. At March, the squadron transitioned to the Martin B-10 bomber. It participated in 1st Wing maneuvers in 1935 and 1938 and General Headquarters Air Force maneuvers in 1938. It also participated in joint exercises, including coastal defense exercises in 1937, an antiaircraft exercise in Pennsylvania in 1939 and an amphibious landing exercise near Fort Ord, California in 1940.

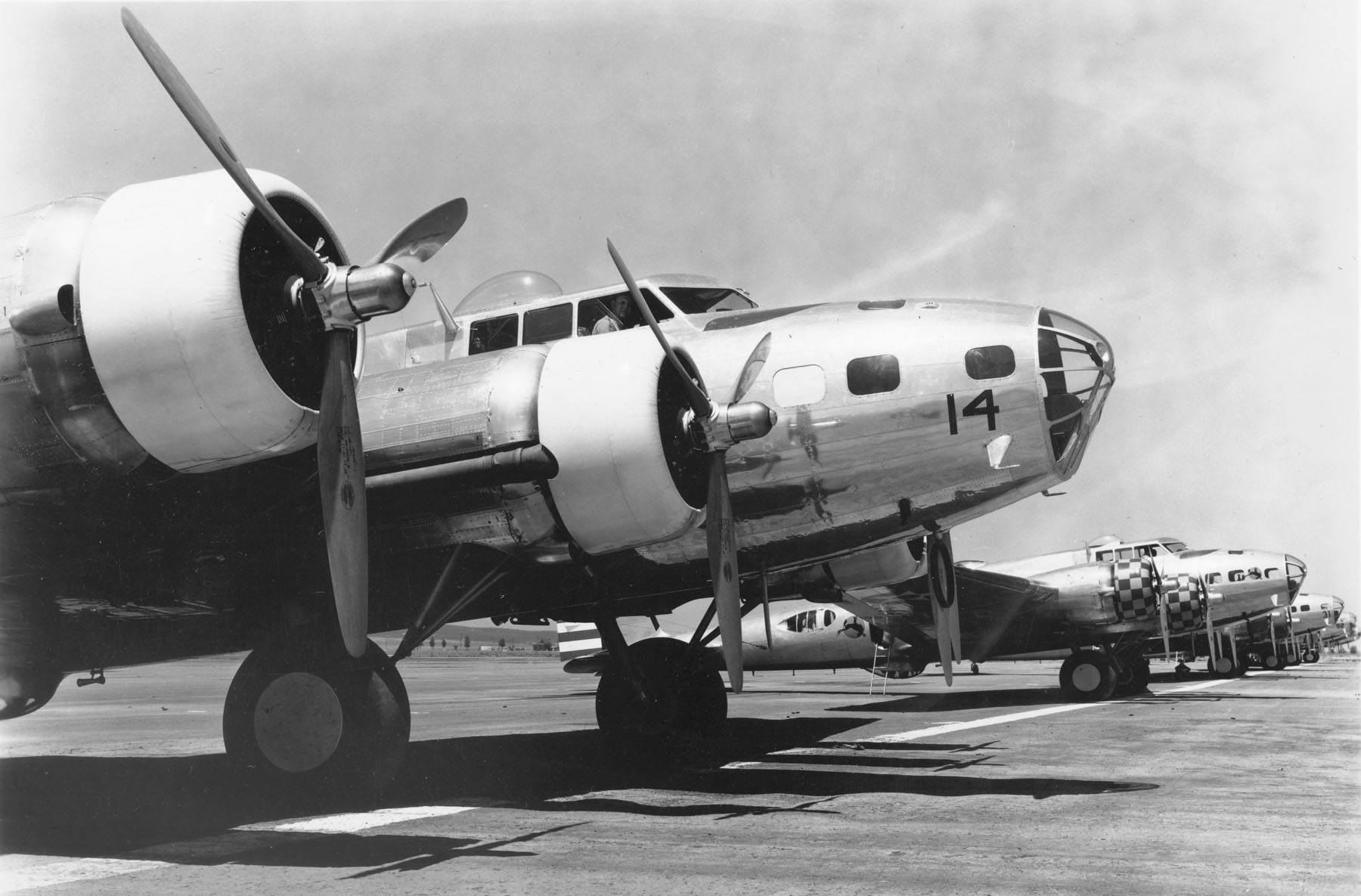
Boeing B-17B Flying Fortresses at March Field, 1941

The 30th became a heavy bombardment squadron in December 1939 when it received its first Boeing B-17B Flying Fortresses. The B-17B was the first production version of the Flying Fortress, and the squadron was upgraded to the faster and better-armed B-17C in late 1940, and to the B-17D in 1941. Its primary mission was to train pilots and navigators in heavy bomber operations. In May 1941 the squadron ferried Flying Fortresses to Hickam Field, Hawaii to transfer them to the 11th Bombardment Group. The squadron remained in Hawaii for two weeks to train the 11th's aircrews on their new planes. This mission also provided the squadron with experience in long range overwater flights that would prove valuable in a few short months.

In October, the squadron, along with the 93d Bombardment Squadron and headquarters of the 19th Group undertook the first mass flight across the Pacific, as they flew to reinforce American forces in the Philippines. The 30th was in the lead for this movement, with all but one of the group's planes in place at its new station, Clark Field, on Luzon by 10 November. The 10,000-mile trip had been conducted almost entirely over water. The squadron's ground echelon was already at Clark, having sailed on the USAT Willard A. Holbrook on 6 October. When the 19th Bombardment Group arrived in the Philippines, it absorbed the two bomber squadrons already there, the 14th and 28th Bombardment Squadrons. The 28th was equipped with obsolescent planes and the decision was made to evenly distribute the group's B-17s among its squadrons. As a result, in November, the squadron lost two of its Flying Fortresses and absorbed aircrews with no experience on the B-17.

=== World War II ===
==== Battle of the Philippines ====
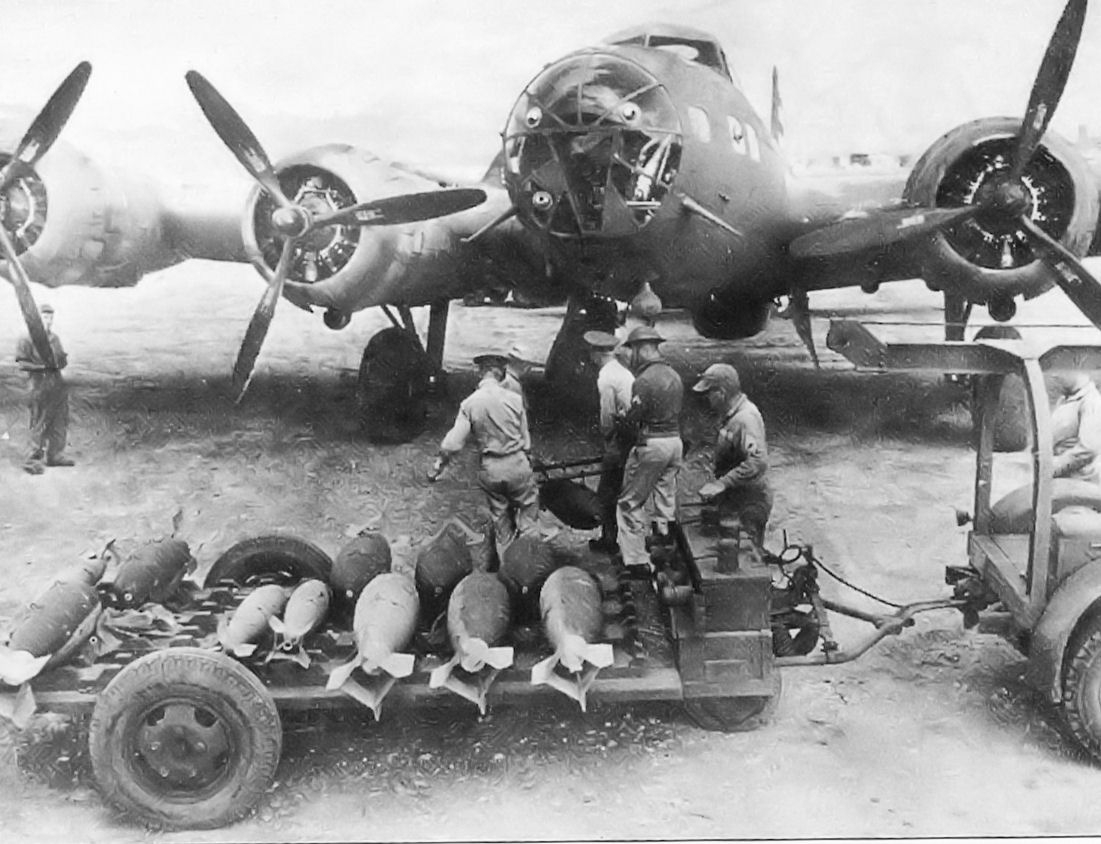
A B-17D being loaded with bombs (Note: Note the Fortress is parked in a rough, dirt area and the early M1917 helmet and prewar uniform worn by one of the ground crew indicating the photo was taken in a combat area in the first few weeks of the war. Probably taken at Del Monte Airfield.)

The 30th Bombardment Squadron had its B-17D aircraft on the line at Clark Field on 8 December 1941 when word was received at headquarters from Hawaii about 0400 of the Japanese attack on Pearl Harbor. (Note: There is some controversy over the disposition of B-17s at Clark this day. General Brereton, commander of Far East Air Force, stated he sought permission to attack Formosa with the bombers at Clark on 8 December, and was ordered to prepare for the attack, but that General Sutherland would seek permission to fly the mission from General MacArthur, commander of United States Army Forces in the Far East before it could be launched. General Sutherland, MacArthur's Chief of Staff, stated following the war that all B-17s had been ordered to withdraw from Clark to Del Monte Airfield, not just the two squadrons that deployed there. At Del Monte, they would be out of range of Japanese attacks, but could stage through Clark for attacks on Formosa. Edmonds, pp. 85–87.) A little before 0800, the radar at Iba Airfield informed the Air Warning Service at Nielson Field that at least 30 Japanese aircraft were flying south over Luzon apparently headed for Clark Field. Immediate orders were to prepare the squadron's planes for attack, but that no offensive action could be taken until they were fired upon. In order to prevent them from being destroyed on the ground by a Japanese air attack, at about 0800, the 30th's planes began to launch, with orders to remain in the area on the Clark tower radio frequency. By 1030 Japanese bombers had attacked Philippine Air Force bases, and the airborne B-17s returned to Clark.

By 1200, orders had finally arrived for the squadron to prepare to attack targets on Formosa. By 1230, plans for the attack on Formosa were being made and the squadron's planes were nearly loaded with bombs. At about this time, high altitude Japanese bombers struck Clark, followed shortly by strafing fighters. Although the bombers did little damage to the squadron's planes, the strafing fighters destroyed or damaged all of the B-17s on the field. Some of the squadron's enlisted men worked the guns on parked bombers in an attempt to use them against the strafing fighters. Within the next few days ground crews were able to patch together two or three B-17s from damaged and destroyed Flying Forts.

On 10 December, the 19th Group's B-17s from its two squadrons at Del Monte Airfield staged through Clark to attack Japanese shipping. A B-17C flown by one of the squadron's pilots, Captain Colin P. Kelly dropped bombs from high altitude on what the crew thought to be a Japanese battleship. Hits were recorded, and an explosion was observed. Kelly's plane was immediately attacked by Mitsubishi A6M Zeroes, one of which was flown by Saburo Sakai, who was later to become a famous ace. Kelly guided his heavily damaged plane back towards Clark Field. He ordered the crew to parachute to safety, but before Kelly himself could leave, the aircraft exploded and Kelly was killed. Capt Kelly was awarded the Distinguished Service Cross for this mission. The mission of 10 December would be the last flown from Clark. Only two more would be flown from Del Monte before the squadron withdrew to Batchelor Airfield, about 45 miles south of Darwin in Australia's Northern Territory.

The ground crews of the squadron at Clark were no longer needed to support the few planes left and were transferred to 5th Interceptor Command, and fought as infantry during Battle of Bataan. After their surrender, they were subjected to the Bataan Death March, although some did escape to Australia and some presumably fought on as unorganized guerrilla forces during the Japanese occupation.

==== Operations from Australia ====
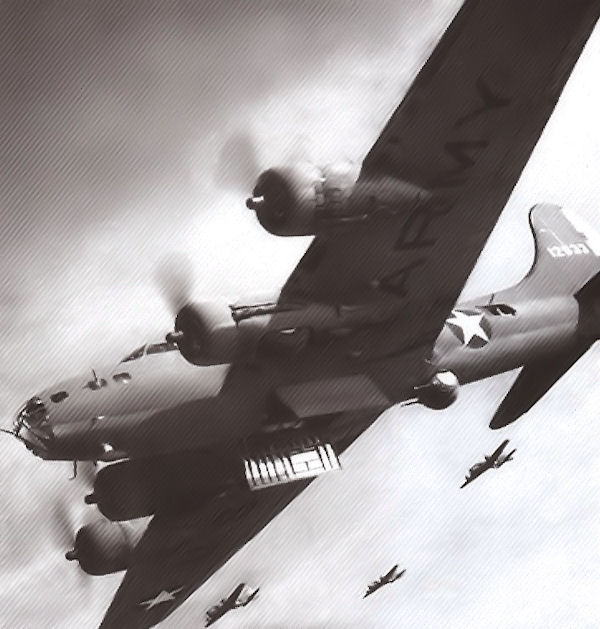
B-17s of the 19th Bombardment Group attacking Japanese-held Lae Airfield, New Guinea on 26–27 June 1942 (Note: The aircraft in foreground is Boeing B-17E Flying Fortress, serial 41-2633 Sally.)

The decimated 19th Bombardment Group in Australia considered itself fortunate to launch eight or nine planes, less than the strength of a single squadron from Australia. In January 1942, the heavy bomber force began to grow, as it was reinforced by the four squadrons of the 7th Bombardment Group for attacks from Singosari Airfield near Malang, Java, in the Netherlands East Indies. The squadron officially moved to Singosari on the last day of 1941. Operating with whatever bombers were available, the squadron probably operated with B-24 and LB-30 Liberators during its time in Java. Its attacks on Japanese forces moving forward through the Philippines and Netherlands East Indies earned it two Distinguished Unit Citations to add to the one it had been awarded for its actions in the Philippines and the one the squadron ground echelon was earning at Bataan. However, by late February, the position of Allied forces in Java had become untenable, and the squadron was evacuated on 2 March back to Australia when the Japanese defeated Allied ground forces in the Dutch East Indies.

The 30th was sent to Northern Queensland where it operated from Cloncurry and Longreach Airports. From Longreach, the squadron participated in the Battle of the Coral Sea in May 1942, and raided enemy transportation and communications targets as well as troop concentrations during the Japanese invasion of Papua New Guinea. Moving to Mareeba Airfield, along the coast of the Coral Sea in Queensland, the squadron bombed enemy airdromes, ground installations, and shipping near Rabaul, New Britain in August 1942. The squadron earned another DUC for these operations.

By late 1942, the Army Air Forces decided that no more B-17s would be sent to the Pacific, and that units would be withdrawn or re-equipped with the longer-ranged B-24 Liberator. The men of the 30th Bombardment Squadron left Mareeba Airfield on 10 November 1942, and returned to the United States after nearly a year of continuous combat.

==== B-29 Superfortress operations against Japan ====
The squadron arrived at its new base at Pocatello Army Air Field, Idaho, where it became a B-17 Replacement Training Unit (RTU). The RTU was an oversized unit to train individual pilots and aircrews for combat units. The squadron continued its training mission when it moved to Pyote Army Air Base, Texas in January 1943. However, the Army Air Forces was finding that standard military units, which were organized based on relatively inflexible tables of organization were not proving well adapted to the training mission. Accordingly, it adopted a more functional system in which each base was organized into a separate numbered unit. The squadron was inactivated on 1 April 1944 and its assets and those of other units at Pyote were transferred to the 236th AAF Base Unit (Combat Crew Training Unit, Bombardment), which was organized the same day.

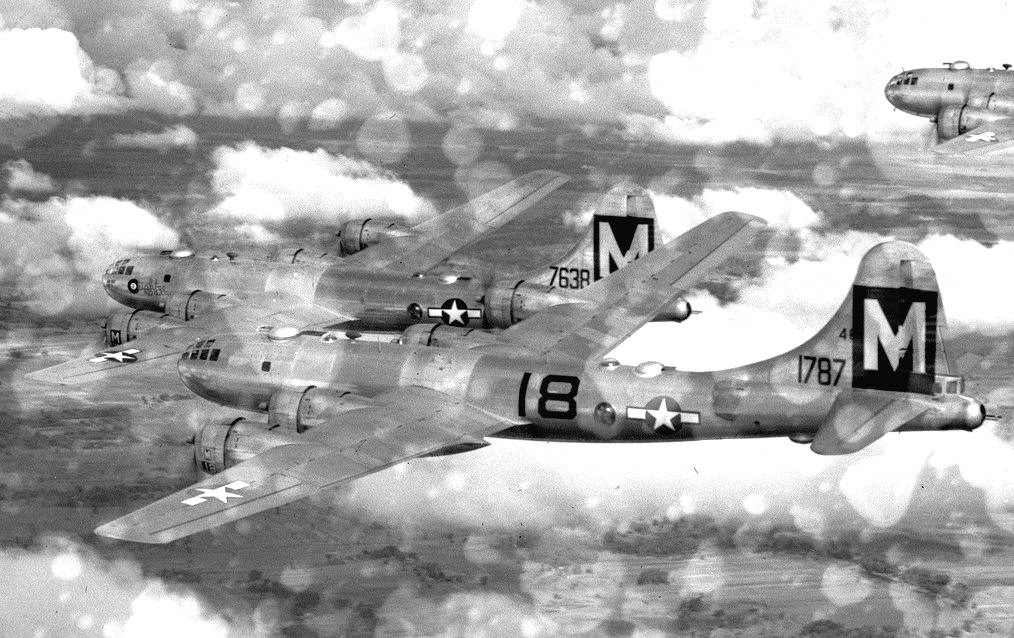
19th Bombardment Group B-29 Superfortresses 1945

The squadron was activated with new personnel at Great Bend Army Air Field, Kansas the same day it was inactivated at Pyote. At Great Bend, the squadron began training as a Boeing B-29 Superfortress very heavy bombardment squadron. It completed training by the end of the year and deployed to North Field, Guam, arriving in January 1945. The squadron flew its first combat mission on 12 February 1945 against a Japanese airfield on Rota and began participating in the strategic bombing campaign against Japan with a mission to Tokyo on 25 February.

The squadron initially conducted high altitude daylight raids against strategic targets in Japan such as aircraft factories, chemical plants, and oil refineries. The results of high altitude B-29 raids on Japan, however, were disappointing. More than a month after a raid on 19 January 1945, no mission had been able to bomb visually, and radar bombing results were unsatisfactory. Low altitude night area attacks with incendiaries promised better results, and the squadron began the switch with the launch of a raid against Tokyo on 9 March 1945. On 11 March, the squadron attacked Nagoya. Six high altitude raids on aircraft production facilities there had failed to inflict significant damage. Although no aircraft factories were taken out of production by this attack, the Aichi plant was damaged enough to reduce its production. A raid on Osaka followed on 13 March. Cloud cover forced the squadron to use radar bombing, but over 100 manufacturing facilities were destroyed in the raid. (Note: Many of these were small facilities, but some were engaged in heavy industry. Cate & Olson p. 620.) Kobe was attacked on the 13th and a return to Nagoya occurred on the 19th. Its participation in these raids earned the squadron another DUC. The squadron earned another DUC for a low altitude daylight attack against Kobe on 5 June, which was heavily opposed by Japanese fighters. This attack eliminated Kobe as a target for future incendiary attacks.

During April and May 1945, the squadron was diverted from the strategic campaign against Japan to support Operation Iceberg, the invasion of Okinawa. It struck air bases from which kamikaze attacks were being launched. Many of these bases were located on Kyushu, only 300 miles from Okinawa. The attacks directly impacted kamikaze launches, but also forced the Japanese military to retain fighter aircraft to defend the Japanese Special Attack Units that otherwise might have been used to challenge air superiority over Okinawa. (Note: 75% of Twentieth Air Force's missions in April and May 1945 were flown to support Operation Iceberg. Cate & Olson p. 631.)

After the Japanese surrender, the squadron flew airlift missions, dropping supplies to prisoners of war and participated in show of force missions over Japan.

=== Korean War ===
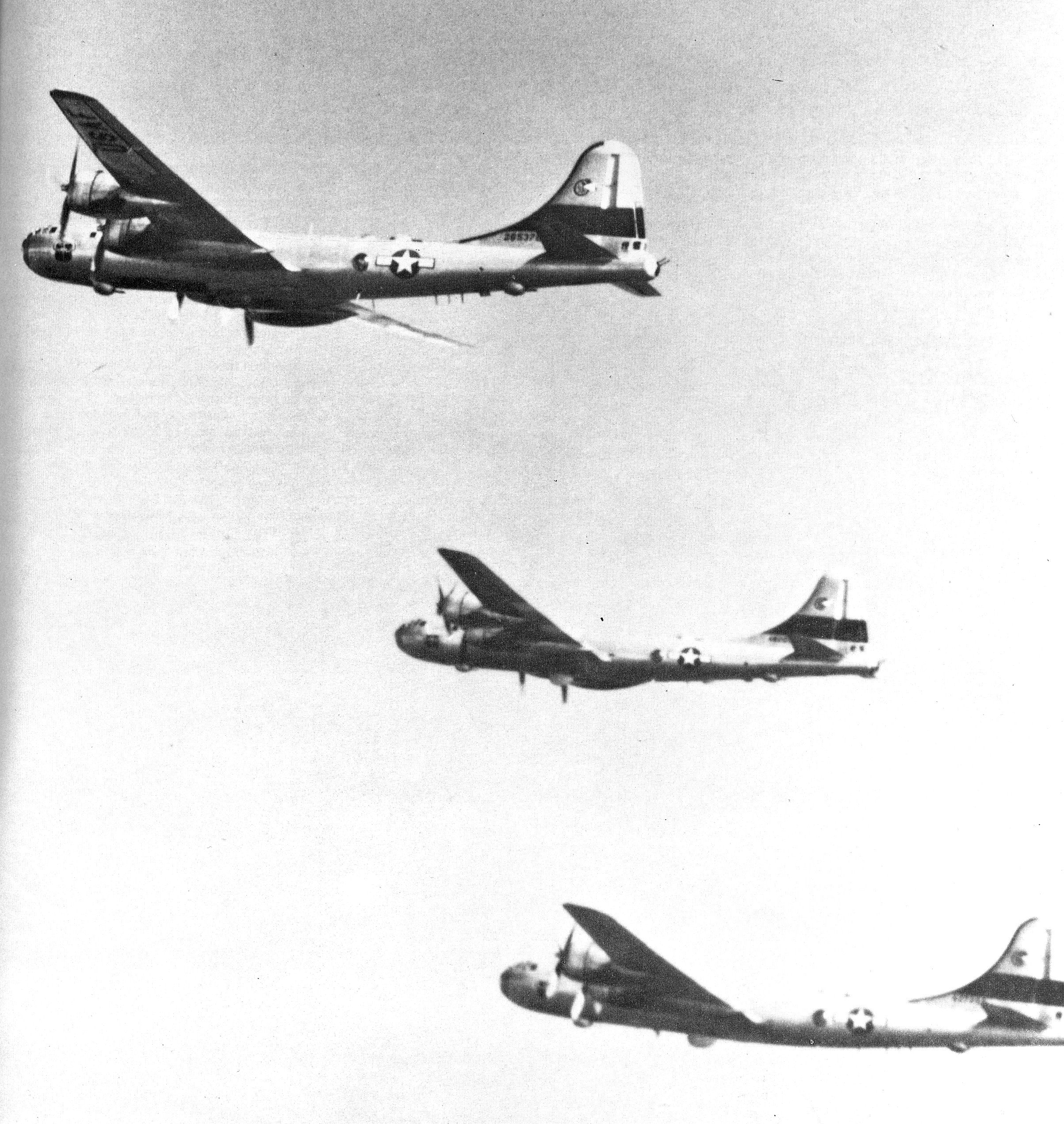
19th Group B-29 Superfortresses during the Korean War

Following V-J Day, the squadron remained on Guam as part of the 19th Bombardment Group. It was still stationed there when Korean People's Army forces attacked across the 38th Parallel. On 27 June, the squadron along with combat and maintenance elements of the 19th Bombardment Wing to Kadena Air Base, Okinawa as the first B-29 units to participate in the Korean War. It operated under the control of the provisional Far East Air Forces Bomber Command after 8 July, when it combined with B-29 units deployed from Strategic Air Command (SAC). It attacked petroleum storage facilities, and supported ground troops by attacks on the bridges over the Han River. It also struck targets in North Korea, particularly after United Nations troops advanced. Including port facilities at Wonsan, Yonpo Airfield and industrial and hydroelectric facilities, in addition to air interdiction targets. The squadron earned an additional DUC for its actions in the first two months of the war.

In June 1953, 19th Wing headquarters moved on paper from Anderson Air Force Base to Kadena, replacing the 19th Group. The squadron was assigned directly to the wing. The squadron remained on Kadena until 16 May 1954.

=== Strategic Air Command ===
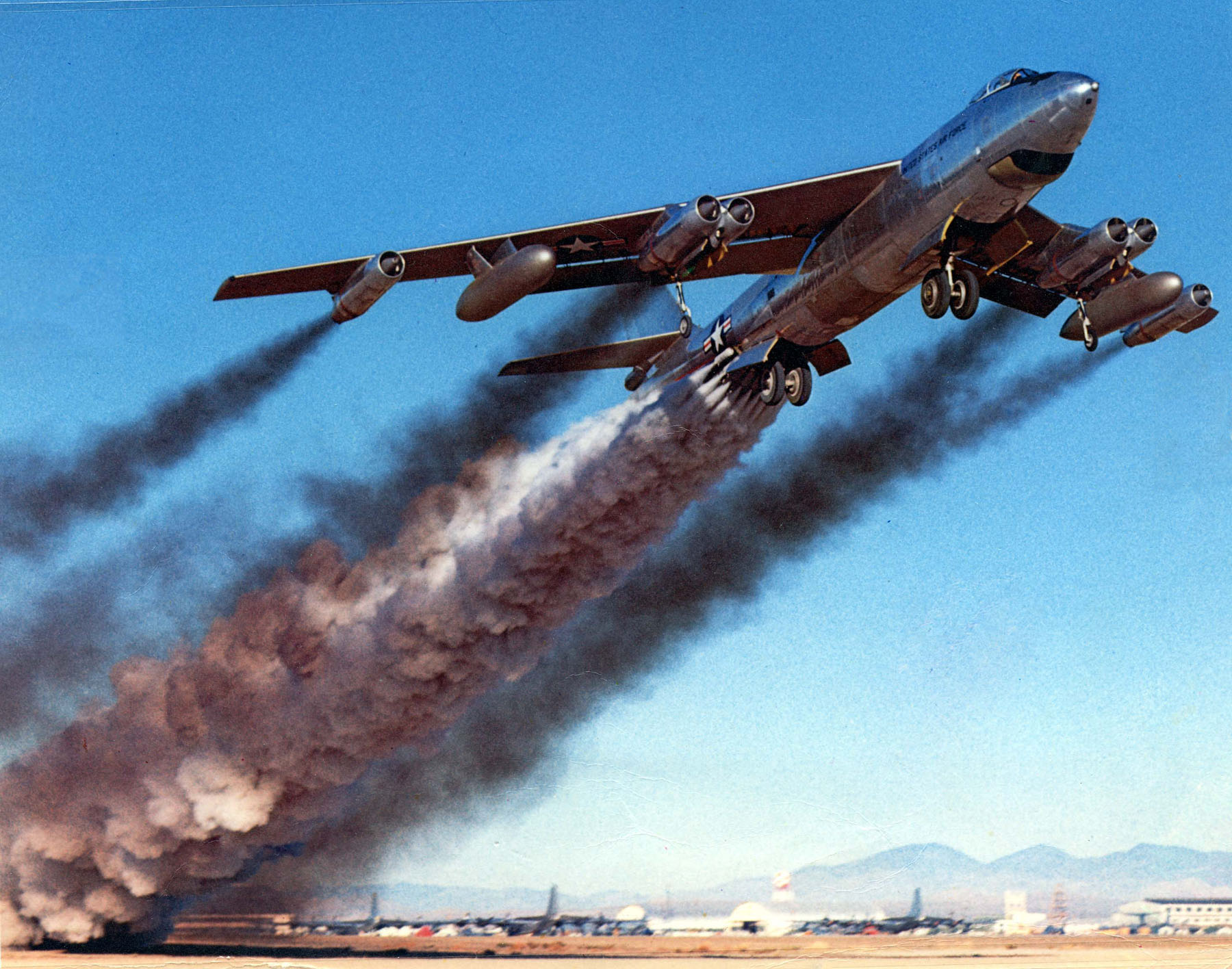
B-47 rocket-assisted take off

In 1954, the squadron ferried its B-29s to Davis–Monthan Air Force Base, Arizona for storage. It continued without aircraft to Pinecastle Air Force Base, Florida, arriving in on 30 May. At Pinecastle, it reformed as a Boeing B-47 Stratojet unit, drawing some of its first aircraft from the 4240th Flying Training Wing, which was inactivated on 1 June, and which had been a training unit for B-47s at Pinecastle. After training with the Stratojets at Pinecastle, the squadron moved to Homestead Air Force Base, Florida.

The squadron deployed its B-47s with the entire wing to Morocco twice. It deployed from Pinecastle to Sidi Slimane Air Base from January to April 1956, and from Homestead to Ben Guerir Air Base from May to July 1957. After July 1957 the squadron began to participate in Operation Reflex, which placed Stratojets and Boeing KC-97s on alert at overseas bases for 90-day periods, although individuals rotated back to home bases during unit Reflex deployments The squadron continued to deploy its bombers until 1961. Starting in 1958, the squadron also began to assume an alert posture at its home base, reducing the amount of time it spent on alert overseas.

In 1961, the 19th Bombardment Wing began converting from the B-47 to the Boeing B-52H Stratofortress. However, Strategic Air Command (SAC) determined to disperse its B-52 force to reduce its vulnerability to a Soviet missile strike SAC bases with large concentrations of bombers made attractive targets. SAC's response was to break up its wings and scatter their aircraft over a larger number of bases. As part of this program, the 30th moved to Grand Forks Air Force Base, North Dakota and became part of the 4133d Strategic Wing to complete its transition to the new bombers. Once it was combat ready, its alert commitment was increased to half the squadron's aircraft.

The squadron conducted worldwide strategic bombardment training missions and provided a nuclear deterrent. As tensions heightened during the Cuban Missile Crisis, on 24 October 1962, SAC went to DEFCON 2, placing all its combat aircraft on alert. On 21 November SAC returned to normal airborne alert posture and reduced its readiness status to DEFCON 3. On 27 November SAC returned to normal alert posture. The 4133d Wing was a Major Command controlled wing, which could not carry a permanent history or lineage, and SAC wanted to replace it with a permanent unit. As a result, SAC activated the 319th Bombardment Wing at Grand Forks. The 30th inactivated and transferred its mission, personnel and equipment to the 46th Bombardment Squadron, which was simultaneously activated.

=== Consolidation ===
On 19 September 1985 the Air Force consolidated the 30th Bombardment Squadron with the USAF Air Demonstration Squadron, the USAF Thunderbirds, which had been organized on 25 February 1957.

== Lineage ==
- Organized as the 30th Aero Squadron on 13 June 1917

Demobilized on 14 April 1919

- Reconstituted as the 30th Bombardment Squadron, on 24 March 1923 (Note: Clay states the squadron was reconstituted as the 30th Squadron (Bombardment), but gives a date for redesignation as the 30th Bombardment Squadron in January 1923, before it was reconstituted. Clay, p. 1396.)

Organized with reserve personnel on 30 June 1926 (inactive)
Reserve personnel withdrawn on 28 February 1927
Organized with reserve personnel on 15 January 1930 (inactive)
Reserve personnel withdrawn on 24 June 1932

- Activated on 24 June 1932

Redesignated 30th Bombardment Squadron (Heavy) on 6 December 1939
Redesignated 30th Bombardment Squadron, Very Heavy on 28 March 1944
Inactivated on 1 April 1944

- Activated on 1 April 1944

Redesignated 30th Bombardment Squadron, Medium on 10 August 1948
Redesignated 30th Bombardment Squadron, Heavy on 1 July 1961
Discontinued and inactivated on 1 February 1963

- Consolidated with USAF Air Demonstration Squadron as USAF Air Demonstration Squadron on 19 September 1985

=== Assignments ===
- Post Headquarters, Kelly Field, 13 June 1917
- Aviation Concentration Center, 11 August–15 September 1917
- Third Aviation Instruction Center, 23 September 1917
- 1st Air Depot, January 1919
- Services of Supply. c. 6 January – c. 18 March 1919
- Eastern Department, c. 5–14 April 1919
- 7th Bombardment Group, 24 March 1923 (inactive)
- Third Corps Area, 30 June 1926
- Ninth Corps Area, 28 February 1927
- Eighth Corps Area, 1 September 1928 – 24 June 1932 (Reserves)
- 19th Bombardment Group, 24 June 1932 – 1 April 1944 (ground echelon attached to 5th Interceptor Command, c. 20 December 1941 – c. 10 May 1942)
- 19th Bombardment Group, 1 April 1944
- 19th Bombardment Wing, 1 June 1953
- 4133d Strategic Wing, 1 January 1962 – 1 February 1963

=== Stations ===
- Camp Kelly (later Kelly Field, Texas, 13 June – 11 August 1917
- Étampes aerodrome, France, 19 September 1917
- Issoudun Aerodrome, France, 23 September 1917
- Bordeaux, France, c. 6 January – c. 18 March 1919
- Mitchel Field, New York, c. 5–14 April 1919

Reserve personnel assigned at Langley Field, Virginia (inactive), 30 June 1926 – 28 February 1927
Reserve personnel assigned at Kelly Field, Texas (inactive), 15 January 1930 – 24 June 1932

- Rockwell Field, California, 24 June 1932
- March Field, California, 25 October 1935
- Albuquerque Army Air Base, New Mexico, – 27 June September 1941
- Clark Field, Luzon, Philippines, c. 23 October 1941
- Batchelor Field, Australia, c. 20 December 1941

Ground echelon in Luzon and Mindanao, Philippines, c. 20 December 1941 – May 1942

- Singosari Field, Java, Netherlands East Indies, c. 31 December 1941
- Melbourne Airport, Australia, c. 5 March 1942
- Cloncurry Airport, Australia, c. 27 March 1942
- Longreach Airport, Australia, c. 13 May 1942
- Mareeba Airfield, Australia, c. 24 July – c. 10 November 1942
- Pocatello Army Air Field, Idaho, c. 9 December 1942
- Pyote Army Air Base, Texas, 24 January 1943 – 1 April 1944
- Great Bend Army Air Field, Kansas, 1 April – 8 December 1944
- North Field (later Anderson Air Force Base), Guam, 15 January 1945
- Kadena Air Base, Okinawa, 27 June 1950 – 16 May 1954
- Pinecastle Air Force Base, Florida, 30 May 1954
- Homestead Air Force Base, Florida, c. 25 June 1956
- Grand Forks Air Force Base, North Dakota, 1 January 1962 – 1 February 1963

=== Aircraft ===
- Fokker O-27, 1932–1936
- Douglas OA-4 Dolphin, 1932–1936
- Douglas YOA-5, 1932–1936
- Keystone B-3, 1932–1936
- Martin B-12, 1932–1936
- Martin B-10, 1935 – c. 1937
- Douglas B-18 Bolo, c. 1937 – c. 1939
- Boeing B-17 Flying Fortress, c. 1939 – 1942, 1942–1944
- Probably Consolidated B-24 and LB-30 Liberators, 1941–1942
- Boeing B-29 Superfortress, 1944–1954
- Boeing B-47 Stratojet, 1954–1961
- Boeing B-52H Stratofortress, 1962–1963

=== Awards and campaigns ===
Award streamer	Award	Dates	Notes
	Distinguished Unit Citation	7 December 1941–10 May 1942	Philippine Islands, 30th Bombardment Squadron
	Distinguished Unit Citation	8–22 December 1941	Philippine Islands, 30th Bombardment Squadron
	Distinguished Unit Citation	1 January–1 March 1942	Philippines and Netherlands Indies, 30th Bombardment Squadron
	Distinguished Unit Citation	6 January–8 March 1942	Philippine Islands, 30th Bombardment Squadron
	Distinguished Unit Citation	23 July–c. 10 November 1942	Papua, 30th Bombardment Squadron
	Distinguished Unit Citation	7–12 August 1942	New Britain, 30th Bombardment Squadron
	Distinguished Unit Citation	9–19 March 1945	Japan, 30th Bombardment Squadron
	Distinguished Unit Citation	5 June 1945	Kobe, Japan, 30th Bombardment Squadron
	Distinguished Unit Citation	28 June–15 September 1950	Korea, 30th Bombardment Squadron
	Philippine Republic Presidential Unit Citation	8 December 1941-10 May 1942	Philippines, 30th Bombardment Squadron
	Korean Presidential Unit Citation	7 July 1950–27 July 1953	Korea, 30th Bombardment Squadron

Campaign Streamer	Campaign	Dates	Notes
	Theater of Operations	19 November 1917 – 11 November 1918	30th Aero Squadron
	American Theater without inscription	9 December 1942 – 8 December 1944	30th Bombardment Squadrpm
	Air Combat, Asiatic–Pacific Theater	7 December 1941 – 10 November 1942, 15 January 1945 – 2 March 1946	30th Bombardment Squadron
	Philippine Islands	7 December 1941 – 10 May 1942	30th Bombardment Squadron
	East Indies	1 January 1942 – 22 July 1942	30th Bombardment Squadron
	Guadalcanal	7 August 1942 – 21 February 1943	30th Bombardment Squadron
	Papua	23 July 1942 – 10 November 1942	30th Bombardment Squadron
	Air Offensive, Japan	15 January 1945 – 2 September 1945	30th Bombardment Squadron
	Western Pacific	17 April 1945 – 2 September 1945	30th Bombardment Squadron
	UN Defensive	27 June 1950 – 15 September 1950	30th Bombardment Squadron
	UN Offensive	16 September 1950 – 2 November 1950	30th Bombardment Squadron
	CCF Intervention	3 November 1950 – 24 January 1951	30th Bombardment Squadron
	1st UN Counteroffensive	25 January 1951 – 21 April 1951	30th Bombardment Squadron
	CCF Spring Offensive	22 April 1951 – 9 July 1951	30th Bombardment Squadron
	UN Summer-Fall Offensive	9 July 1951 – 27 November 1951	30th Bombardment Squadron
	Second Korean Winter	28 November 1951 – 30 April 1952	30th Bombardment Squadron
	Korea Summer-Fall 1952	1 May 1952 – 30 November 1952	30th Bombardment Squadron
	Third Korean Winter	1 December 1952 – 30 April 1953	30th Bombardment Squadron

== See also ==
- B-17 Flying Fortress units of the United States Army Air Forces
- B-24 Liberator units of the United States Army Air Forces
- List of American aero squadrons
- List of B-29 Superfortress operators
- List of B-47 units of the United States Air Force
- List of B-52 Units of the United States Air Force
