= 19th Operations Group =

US Air Force division

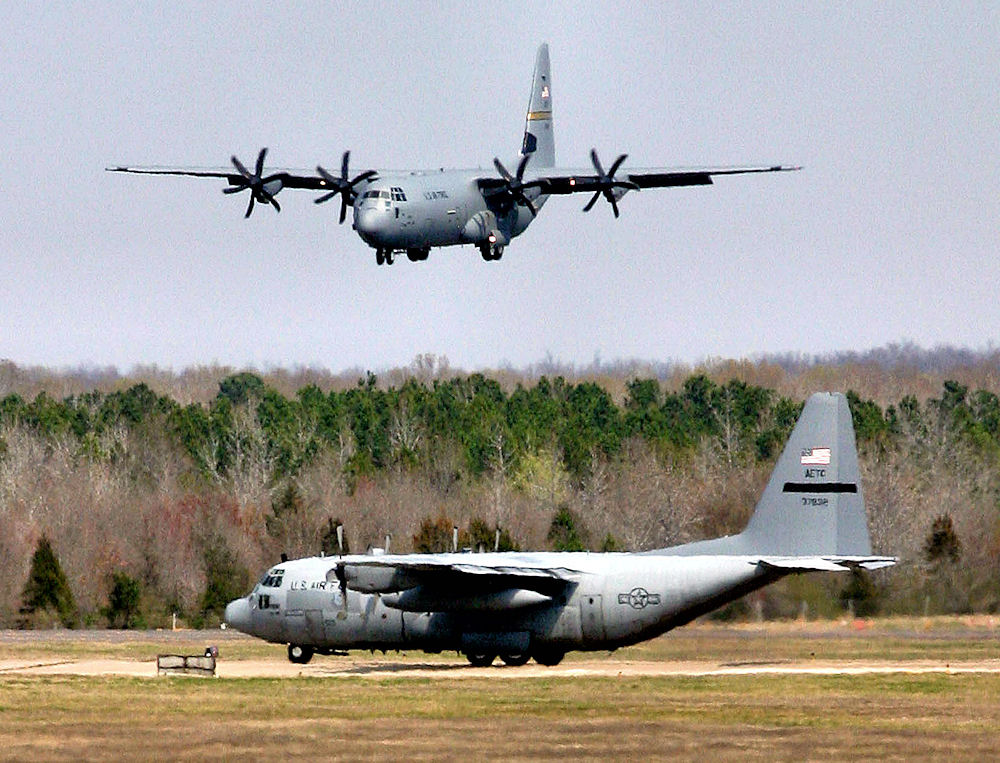
- C-130Js at Little Rock AFB
- Active: 1927–1953; 1991–2008; 2008–present
- Country: United States
- Branch: United States Air Force
- Role: Airlift
- Part of: Air Mobility Command
- Garrison/HQ: Little Rock Air Force Base, Arkansas
- Motto: In Alis vincimus (Latin for 'On Wings We Conquer') Checkmate to Aggression
- Engagements: World War II; American Theater (1942–1944) -Asiatic-Pacific Campaign (1941–1942, 1944–1945): Korean Service (1950–1953); Grenada (1983); Southwest Asia (1990–1991)
- Decorations: Air Force Outstanding Unit Award; Republic of Korea Presidential Unit Citation

Commanders
- Current commander: Colonel Andrew Rodden

Insignia
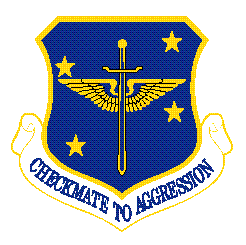
- 19th Operations Group emblem (Note: While assigned to the 19th Wing, the group uses the wing emblem with the group designation on the scroll. AF Instruction 84-105, Organizational Lineage, Honors and History, 27 April 2017, paragraph 3.3.3.)

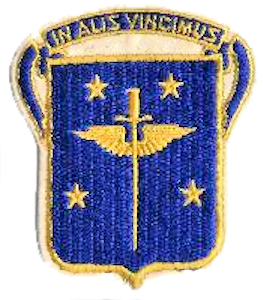
- 19th Bombardment Group emblem (Note: Approved 19 October 1936. The group's emblem shows a winged sword in front of the constellation of Pegasus, indicating both the striking force and navigation capability of the unit.)

The 19th Operations Group is an inactive Air Force unit. It was most recently the operational flying component of the United States Air Force 19th Airlift Wing, stationed at Little Rock Air Force Base, Arkansas.

Equipped with the Lockheed C-130 Hercules, the group provides part of Air Mobility Command's Global Reach capability. Tasking requirements range from supplying humanitarian airlift relief to victims of disasters, to airdropping supplies and troops into the heart of contingency operations in hostile areas.

The group is one of the oldest organizations in the Air Force, being a successor organization of the 19th Bombardment Group, one of the 15 combat air groups formed by the Army before World War II.

As part of the Far East Air Force, the unit was stationed at Clark Field in the Philippines when the Japanese attacked on 8 December 1941, suffering numerous casualties and losing most of its Boeing B-17 Flying Fortresses in the attack. A small number of its aircraft escaped to fly combat missions in the Philippines; Netherlands East Indies and Papua New Guinea during early 1942.

In March 1942, the group was re-established in Australia, as part of the Fifth Air Force. From far-flung bases in Queensland, the Northern Territory and Western Australia, the group carried out missions over Japanese-held areas in New Guinea and the Dutch East Indies.

After moving to Guam in 1944, the group was re-equipped with the Boeing B-29 Superfortress and conducted its first raid with B-29s on 25 February 1945, against Tokyo.

The group has earned the distinction of being one of the most decorated units in the Air Force. Unit honors include nine Presidential Unit Citations, two Air Force Meritorious Unit Awards, ten Air Force Outstanding Unit Awards, one Philippine Presidential Unit Citation, and one Republic of Korea Presidential Unit Citation.

== History ==
The 19th Observation Group was constituted as part of the United States Army Air Corps on 18 October 1927, without personnel or equipment. In 1929 its paper designation was changed to the 19th Bombardment Group, and it came into being with its activation at Rockwell Field, California, in June 1932. Two of its four squadrons, the 23rd and 72nd Bomb Squadrons, were permanently detached for service in Hawaii with the 5th Composite Group. The two squadrons at Rockwell, the 30th and 32nd Bomb Squadrons, were equipped with Keystone B-3A bombers.

The unit flew training missions along the California coast for coastal defense between 1932 and 1935. On 1 March 1935, all aviation combat units of the AAC in the United States were reorganized into General Headquarters Air Force, the first centralized control of the air striking arm of the United States. The 19th BG moved to March Field, California, in October 1935, as part of the 1st Wing, commanded by Brig. Gen. Henry H. Arnold.

In 1940, the group was equipped with the new B-17B Flying Fortress, the first production version of the B-17. The unit made aviation history on the night of 13–14 May 1941 when they ferried 21 B-17s from California to Hawaii to equip the new 11th Bombardment Group, landing on schedule within 30 minutes of each other and in the order they took off. The crews returned to the United States by ship and relocated to Albuquerque Army Air Base to train navigators.

The 19th BG redeployed two of its three squadrons (the 30th and 93d) to the Philippines between 16 October and 4 November 1941. The 26 bombers, traveling individually and at night on their longest leg, flew a trans-Pacific route from Hamilton Field, California; to Hickam Field, Hawaii; Midway Island; Wake Island; Port Moresby, Papua New Guinea; Darwin, Northern Territory, Australia; and Clark Field, Luzon, a distance of over 10,000 miles, nearly all of it over water. The route had been pioneered between 5 and 12 September 1941 by the 14th Bombardment Squadron, which was attached as the group's third squadron after its arrival.

The 28th Bombardment Squadron, a squadron that had long been based in the Philippines with the 4th Composite Group (being broken up and disbanded), but now rostered by pilots fresh out of flight training, was also attached to the group as its fourth squadron and began transition training to the B-17. The 19th BG had an inventory of 6 B-17C and 29 B-17D, although one B-17D was out of commission during its entire overseas service when it broke off its tail in a collision with a parked aircraft while landing in a typhoon after its flight from the United States on 12 September.

=== World War II ===
==== B-17 Flying Fortress era ====
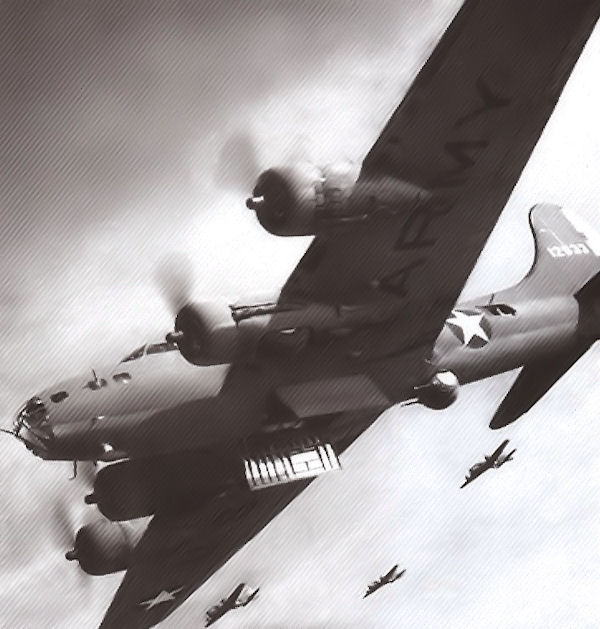
B-17s of the 19th Bombardment Group attacking Japanese-held Lae Airfield, New Guinea on 26–27 June 1942 (Note: Boeing B-17E Flying Fortress serial 41-2633 Sally in Foreground. This aircraft was damaged by a storm in April 1945. Afterwards it was flown to Brisbane, Australia for scrapping in May 1945.)

The unit was based at Clark Field as the bomber command of the Far East Air Force when the Japanese attacked on 8 December 1941, inflicting numerous casualties and destroying two-thirds of the 19 B-17s at Clark in the attack. The 14th and 93d Squadrons, with 14 B-17D and two B-17C bombers, had been ordered to Del Monte Airfield on Mindanao just two days prior and escaped unharmed.

During December 1941, the 19th began reconnaissance and bombardment operations against Japanese shipping and landing parties until 17 December when badly in need of depot maintenance, it began displacing south to Darwin. By the end of the year, ground personnel joined infantry units defending the Philippines, while the air echelon in Australia continued operations, including transport of supplies to the Philippines and evacuation of personnel. On 29 December 11 of the survivors moved forward to Singosari Airfield near Malang, Java, to continue combat operations.

The group flew B-17s, B-24s, and LB-30s from Java against enemy airfields, shipping, and ground installations during the Japanese offensive against the Netherlands East Indies during early 1942, and was again evacuated on 2 March to Australia. It participated in the Battle of the Coral Sea, in May 1942, and raided enemy transportation and communications targets as well as troop concentrations during the Japanese invasion of Papua New Guinea. The group bombed enemy airdromes, ground installations, and shipping near Rabaul, New Britain in August 1942. Capt. Harl Pease, who had been with the group since the start of the war, was posthumously awarded the Medal of Honor for a mission flown on 7 August 1942.

By late 1942, the USAAF decided that no more B-17s would be sent to the Pacific, and that units would be withdrawn or re-equipped in the Pacific in favor of the longer-ranged B-24 Liberator. In addition, the combat losses by Eighth Air Force in Europe were reaching such magnitudes that the entire B-17 production was urgently needed for replacements and training in that theater. The 19th Bomb Group was withdrawn from Australia and returned to Pocatello Army Air Base, Idaho in December to be a replacement training organization for II Bomber Command. However, weather in the northwestern United States was not conducive to training missions, and the 19th was moved to Pyote Army Airfield, Texas in January where it performed a training mission until November 1943.

==== B-29 Superfortress era ====
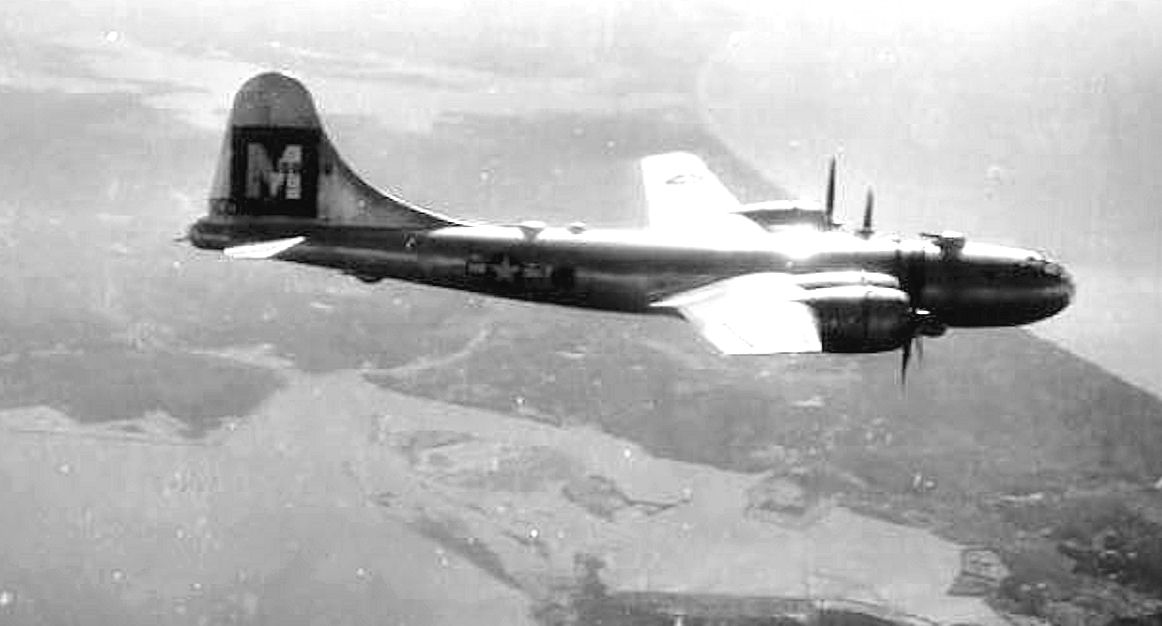
19th Bombardment Group – B-29 Superfortress somewhere over Japan, 1945

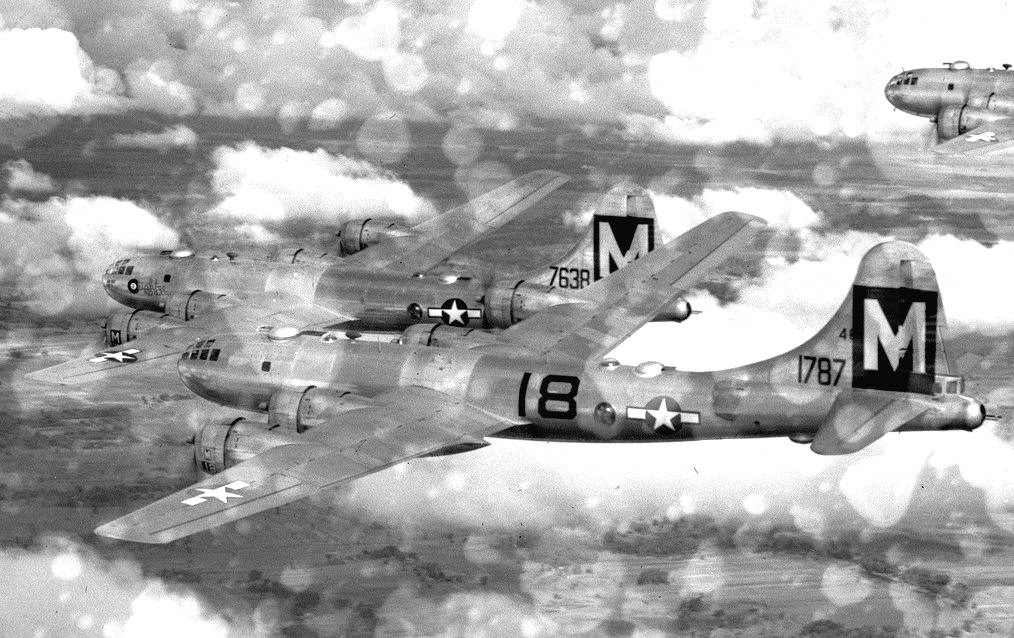
19th Bombardment Group B-29 Superfortresses 1945

The group was largely unmanned from December 1943 to 1 April 1944, when it was inactivated. The group was activated the same date at Great Bend Army Air Field, Kansas, at the 19th Bombardment Group, Very Heavy and began training for Boeing B-29 Superfortress combat missions. Delays in B-29 production and many modifications to the new aircraft led to extensive delays in the group's training. Construction of the B-29 airfields in the Marianas chain of islands, consisting primarily of Saipan, Tinian, and Guam, also delayed deployment to the Pacific until the group was ordered to the massive new North Field, Guam on 16 January 1945. On Guam the 19th was assigned to the 314th Bombardment Wing, XXI Bomber Command, Twentieth Air Force. The group's aircraft were identified with a large 96-inch black box on the tail fin, with a "M" painted in the middle.

After some familiarity and training missions, the 19th conducted its first B-29 bombing raid over Japan on 25 February 1945, attacking Northeast Tokyo on a high-altitude bombing mission. The bombing results, however were poor. Over Japan, the B-29s encountered the jet stream, which was a high-speed wind coming out of the west at speeds as high as 200 mph at precisely the altitudes at which the bombers were operating. This caused the bomber formations to be disrupted and made accurate bombing impossible. Other targets in Japan were attacked and the results were still disappointing. Only ten percent of the damage done by the bombs was actually inside the target areas, and numerous aircraft were lost in these raids, many to accidents caused by engine failures due to the stress of flying in the jet stream.

Concerned about the relative failure of the B-29 offensive to deal any crippling blows to Japan, General LeMay issued a new directive on 19 February. General LeMay had analyzed the structure of the Japanese economy, which depended heavily on cottage industries housed in cities close to major industrial areas. By destroying these feeder industries, the flow of vital components to the central plants could be slowed, disorganizing production of weapons vital to Japan. He decided to do this by using incendiary bombs rather than purely high-explosive bombs, which would, it was hoped, cause general conflagrations in large cities like Tokyo or Nagoya, spreading to some of the priority targets.

The first raid to use these new techniques was on the night of 9–10 March against Tokyo. Another wing—the 314th Bombardment Wing (19th, 29th, 39th, and 330th BG) commanded by Brig. Gen. Thomas S. Power—had arrived in the Marianas and was stationed at North Field on Guam. A total of 302 B-29s participated in the raid, with 279 arriving over the target. The raid was led by special pathfinder crews who marked central aiming points. It lasted for two hours. The raid was a success beyond General LeMay's wildest expectations. The individual fires caused by the bombs joined to create a general conflagration, which would have been classified as a firestorm but for prevailing winds gusting at 17 to 28 mph (27 to 45 km/h). When it was over, sixteen square miles of the center of Tokyo had gone up in flames and nearly 84,000 people had been killed. Fourteen B-29s were lost. The B-29 was finally beginning to have an effect.

By 20 March, XXI Bomber Command had run out of incendiaries, forcing a momentary pause. While waiting for new incendiary stocks, LeMay devoted his B-29s to flying tactical missions over the island of Kyushu in support of the invasion of Okinawa. Airfields and support facilities were primary targets. These raids lasted until early May.

By the end of the war in August 1945, the 19th Bombardment Group flew 65 raids on the Japanese home islands, bombing strategic targets in Japan, participating in incendiary bomb attacks against Japanese cities, and attacked kamikaze airfields during the invasion of Okinawa in the spring of 1945.

=== From 1945 ===
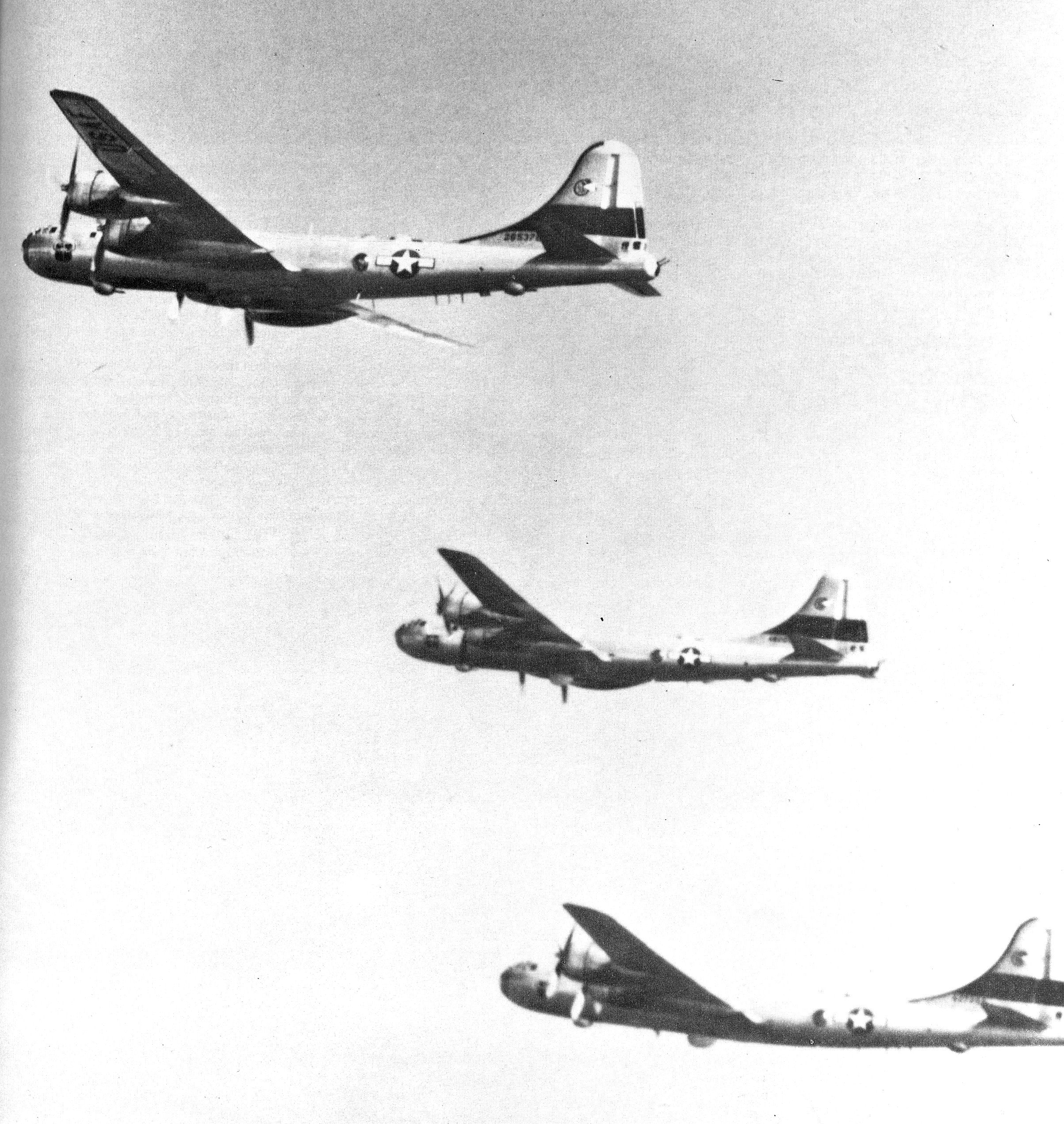
Three 19th Bomb Group B-29 Superfortresses flying west from Andersen AFB, Guam in preparation for combat missions during the Korean War, June 1950

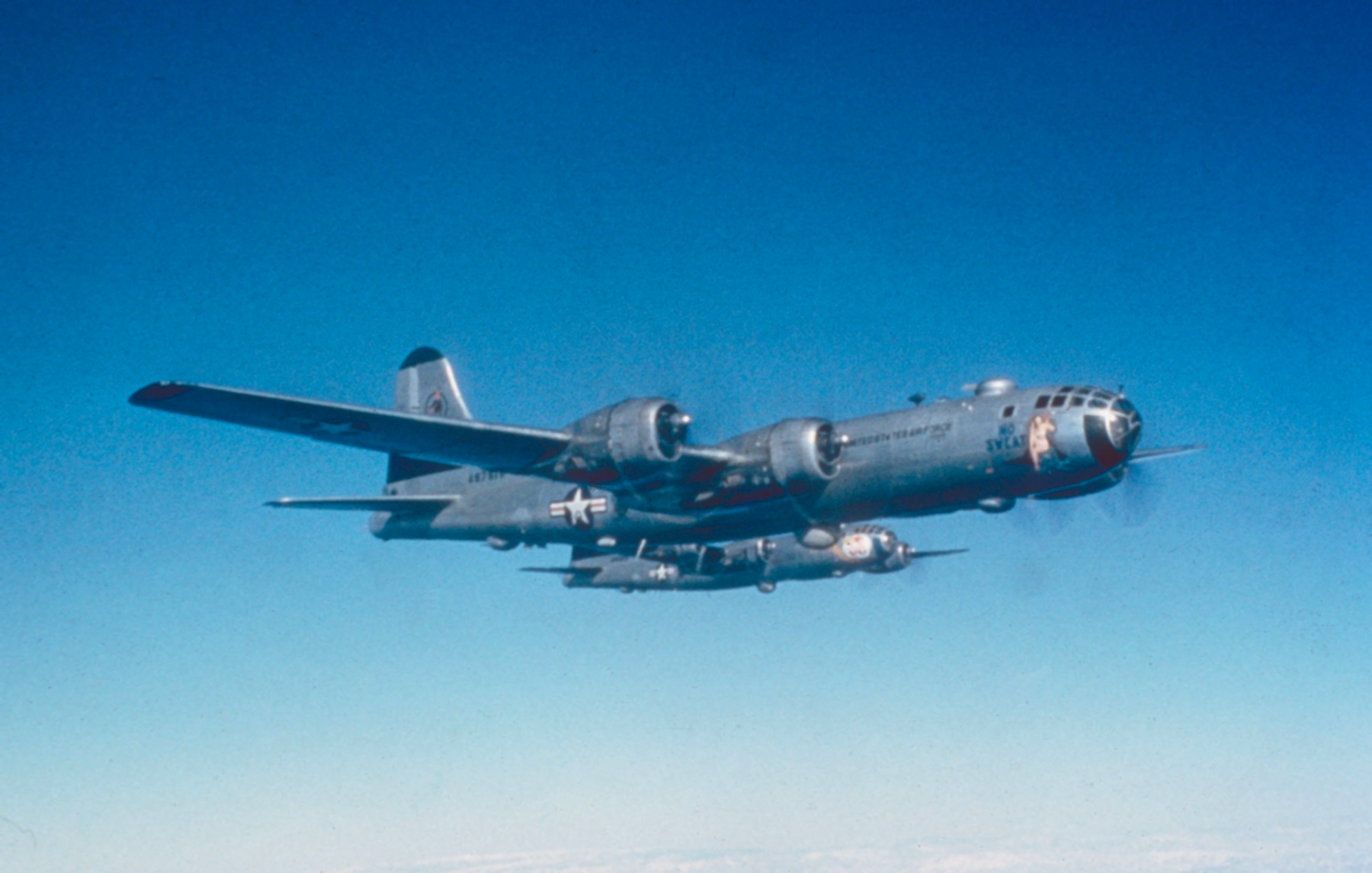
Two 19th Bomb Group B-29s on a mission over Korea, 1950.

In the late 1940s, the 19th conducted sea-search, photographic mapping, and training missions in the western Pacific. It was the only Bombardment Group not in the Strategic Air Command chain of command and, in 1950, the only Bombardment Group permanently stationed outside the continental limits of the United States.

When the Korean War broke out in late June 1950, the 19th Bombardment Group was immediately detached from the Wing for combat operations from Kadena Air Base, Okinawa. From Kadena, the squadrons (28th, 30th 93d) attacked North Korean invasion forces. The first B-29 Superfortress unit in the war, the group on 28 June attacked North Korean storage tanks, marshalling yards, and armor in the vicinity of Seoul, South Korea. This was the first of just under 650 combat missions during the course of the war. In the first two months of the war, it flew more than six hundred sorties, supporting UN ground forces by bombing enemy troops, vehicles, and such communications points as the Han River River bridges.

At Kadena, the group was initially under the operational control of Twentieth Air Force, after 8 July 1950, it was attached to FEAF Bomber Command (Provisional). Many of the aircraft flown by the 19th Bomb Group squadrons in combat were refurbished B-29s that were placed in storage after World War II, then brought back into operational service.

In the north, its targets included an oil refinery and port facilities at Wonsan, a railroad bridge at Pyongyang, and Yonpo Airfield. After United Nations ground forces pushed the communists out of South Korea, the 19th BG turned to strategic objectives in North Korea, including industrial and hydroelectric facilities. It also continued to attack bridges, marshalling yards, supply centers, artillery and troop positions, barracks, port facilities, and airfields.

In accordance with organizational change within the Strategic Air Command and later throughout the entire Air Force, the 19th Bomb Group was inactivated on 1 June 1953 and its squadrons assigned directly to the 19th Bomb Wing as part of the Tri-Deputate organization of the wing, which moved its headquarters to Kadena. In combat over the skies of Korea, there were at least 33 reported aircraft losses in the 19th Bomb Group.

=== From 1991 ===
Reactivated in 1991 as the 19th Operations Group when the 19th Air Refueling Wing implemented the Objective Wing organization.

From January 1992, it provided an EC-137 and crews to support the United States Special Operations Command, and from August 1992 the wing supported the Saudi Tanker Task Force. It provided air refueling support to NATO fighters in Bosnia in September–October 1995. Several KC-135R tankers deployed to Southwest Asia to support Operation Southern Watch, January–March 1996 and to Turkey for Operation Provide Comfort, April–June 1996.

On 1 July 1996, the 19th Air Refueling Wing was inactivated, and its functions turned over to its operations group, redesignated the 19th Air Refueling Group. The 19th consisted of four squadrons: 19th Operations Support Squadron, 19th Maintenance Squadron, 19th Aircraft Maintenance Squadron, and the 99th Air Refueling Squadron.

The Black Knights returned to Istres, France, in August 1996 deploying five aircraft and 125 personnel in support of Operation Deny Flight. In December, the group received an inspection from the Air Mobility Command's Quality Air Force Assessment Team. During the inspection, the team found the 19th's leadership, support, and maintenance to be among the best in Air Mobility Command.

Black Knight aircraft and personnel deployed to numerous contingency operations and exercises during 1997 and continued the group's record for success. 1998 proved to be another banner year for the 19th. Most notably, the Black Knights supported Operation Northern Watch, enforcing the United Nations' no-fly zone in northern Iraq; Operation Desert Thunder, US action against Iraqi aggression; and Operation Constant Vigil, US antidrug operations in the Caribbean. The 99th Air Refueling Squadron was named the Air Force Association's Citation of Honor winner for the unit that contributed most to national defense during 1998. Additionally, the 99th won the coveted General Carl A. Spaatz Trophy for 1998—given annually to the "Best Air Refueling Squadron in the US Air Force."

The 19th had made another achievement in 1999 when it earned a rare, "Outstanding" during its Headquarters, Air Mobility Command Operational Readiness Inspection. Additionally, the 19th had just returned from supporting Operation Deliberate Forge and Operation Allied Force (US support for the NATO's Air War over the Former Yugoslavia), having deployed over three-fourths of its personnel and aircraft to four forward operating locations throughout Europe.

=== 21st century ===
Even after the war, the new millennium brought the 19th many new challenges. The Black Knights, although the last home, were the first to reconstitute its forces and prepare for its role as the first on-call expeditionary force for the Air Force's newest Expeditionary Aerospace Force concept. Furthermore, the recognition continued as the 19th received the AMC nomination for USSTRATCOM's Omaha Trophy for DoD's unit that best supported the Single Integrated Operational Plan. Also, the 99 ARS repeated its role as it won the 1999 Spaatz Trophy as well as the AMC nomination for the Citation of Honor Award; the 19 OSS earned the honors of the Best OSS in Twenty-First Air Force; and the 19 AGS not only received the Twenty-First Air Force Maintenance Effectiveness Award, but also dominated the 2000 Rodeo Competition as it brought home the "Best KC-135 Maintenance" Trophy.

The group, as the 19th Air Refueling Group, stationed at Robins Air Force Base, Georgia, provided worldwide in-flight refueling for combat, logistics, and combat support aircraft of the United States and its allies as directed by the Department of Defense.

The 19th Air Refueling Group was inactivated on 30 September 2008 as a result of realignment due to Base Realignment and Closure 2005. It was reactivated and redesignated as the 19th Operations Group at Little Rock Air Force Base, Arkansas, on 1 October 2008. It was inactivated as the 19th Wing transitioned to an A-Staff structure to replace its operations and maintenance groups. The ceremony marking its inactivation was held on 18 September 2025.

=== Lineage ===
- Authorized as 19th Observation Group on 18 October 1927

Redesignated 19th Bombardment Group on 8 May 1929
Activated on 24 June 1932
Redesignated: 19th Bombardment Group (Heavy) on 17 October 1939
Redesignated: 19th Bombardment Group, Very Heavy on 28 March 1944
Inactivated on 1 April 1944
Activated on 1 April 1944
Redesignated 19th Bombardment Group, Medium on 10 August 1948
Inactivated on 1 June 1953
Redesignated 19th Air Refueling Group, Heavy on 31 July 1985 (Remained inactive)
Redesignated 19th Operations Group on 29 August 1991
Activated on 1 September 1991
Redesignated 19th Air Refueling Group on 1 July 1996
Inactivated on 30 September 2008
Redesignated 19th Operations Group and activated on 1 October 2008
Inactivated c. 18 September 2025

=== Assignments ===
- IX Corps Area, 24 June 1932
- 1st Wing (later, 1st Bombardment Wing), 2 March 1935
- IV Bomber Command, 19 September 1941
- Far East Air Force, c. 23 October 1941
- V Bomber Command, 16 November 1941
- Fifth Air Force, Australia, c. March 1942
- V Bomber Command, September 1942
- 15th Bombardment Training Wing, 9 December 1942
- 16th Bombardment Wing, 3 January 1943
- 46th Bombardment Operational Training Wing, 4 September 1943 – 1 April 1944
- Second Air Force, 1 April 1944 (attached to 17th Bombardment Operational Training Wing (Very Heavy)), 1 April-19 December 1944
- XXI Bomber Command, 14 December 1944 (remained attached to 17th Bombardment Operational Training Wing until 19 December 1944)
- 314th Bombardment (later, 314th Composite) Wing, 27 January 1945
- Twentieth Air Force, 15 May 1946
- North Army Air Base Command (Provisional), 20 December 1947
- 19th Bombardment Wing, 17 August 1948 – 1 June 1953

Attached to Far East Air Forces Bomber Command [Provisional] for operational control, 8 July 1950 – 1 June 1953)

- 19th Air Refueling Wing, 1 September 1991
- Twenty-First Air Force, 1 July 1996
- Eighteenth Air Force, 1 October 2003 – 30 September 2008
- 19th Airlift Wing, 1 October 2008 – c. 18 September 2025

=== Components ===
==== World War II/Korean War ====
- 14th Bombardment Squadron: attached 2 December 1941-c. 14 March 1942
- 23d Bombardment Squadron: 24 June 1932 – 12 October 1938 (detached entire period)
- 28th Bombardment Squadron: 16 November 1941 – 1 April 1944; 1 April 1944 – 1 June 1953
- 30th Observation (later Bombardment) Squadron: 24 June 1932 – 1 April 1944; 1 April 1944 – 1 June 1953
- 32d Observation (later Bombardment) Squadron: 24 June 1932 – 16 December 1941 (detached 22 October-16 December 1941)
- 38th Reconnaissance (later Bombardment) Squadron: 1 September 1936 – 13 March 1942 (detached 17 January-13 March 1942)
- 40th Reconnaissance (later 435th Bombardment) Squadron: 14 March 1942 – 1 April 1944 (detached c. 17 July-c. 24 September 1942); 1 April-10 May 1944
- 93d Bombardment Squadron: 20 October 1939 – 1 April 1944; 1 April 1944 – 1 June 1953

==== After 1991 ====
- 7th Air Refueling Squadron: 1 June 1992 – 1 January 1993
- 19th Operations Support Squadron: 1 September 1991 – c. 24 September 2025
- 30th Airlift Squadron: 1 October 2008 – c. September 2015 (?)
- 41st Airlift Squadron: 1 October 2008 – c. 24 September 2025
- 50th Airlift Squadron: 1 October 2008 – 1 Apr 2016 (reactivated Oct 2017 at MacDill AFB as 50th Air Refueling Squadron)
- 52nd Airlift Squadron: 1 October 2009 – c. 24 September 2025
- 53rd Airlift Squadron: 1 October 2008 – c. 24 September 2025
- 61st Airlift Squadron: 1 October 2008 – c. 24 September 2025
- 99th Air Refueling Squadron: 1 September 1991 – 1 September 2008
- 345th Airlift Squadron: 6 August 2010 – c. June 2014 (?)
- 384th Air Refueling Squadron: 1 June 1992 – 1 January 1994
- 712th Air Refueling Squadron: 1 April 1994 – 1 July 1996
- 912th Air Refueling Squadron: 1 September 1991 – 1 April 1994

=== Stations ===
- Rockwell Field, California, 24 June 1932
- March Field, California, 25 October 1935
- Albuquerque Army Air Base, New Mexico, 7 June-29 September 1941
- Clark Field, Philippines, 26 October 1941
- Batchelor Airfield, Australia, 24 December 1941
- Singosari Field, Java, 30 December 1941
- Essendon Airport (Melbourne), Australia, 2 March 1942
- RAAF Base Townsville, Australia, 18 April 1942
- Longreach (Torrens Creek) Airport, Australia, 18 May 1942
- Mareeba Airfield, Australia, 26 July 1942
- RAAF Base Townsville, Australia, 30 November-2 December 1942
- Pocatello Army Air Field, Idaho, 9 December 1942
- Pyote Army Air Field, Texas, 3 January 1943 – 1 April 1944
- Great Bend Army Air Field, Kansas, 1 April 1944
- Dalhart Army Air Field, Texas, 26 May 1944
- Great Bend Army Air Field, Kansas, 23 August 1944
- Fort Lawton, Washington, 11–19 December 1944
- North Field (later North Guam Air Force Base, Andersen Air Force Base), Guam, 16 January 1945
- Kadena Air Base, Okinawa, 5 July 1950 – 1 June 1953
- Robins Air Force Base, Georgia, 1 September 1991 – 30 September 2008
- Little Rock Air Force Base, Arkansas, 1 October 2008 – c. 18 September 2025

=== Aircraft ===
- Keystone B-3, 1932–1935
- Douglas OA-4 Dolphin, 1932–1935
- Grumman OA-9 Goose, 1932–1935
- Martin B-10, 1935–1937
- Martin B-12, 1935–1937
- Douglas B-18 Bolo, 1937–1940
- Boeing B-17 Flying Fortress, 1940–1944
- Consolidated B-24 Liberator, 1942
- Consolidated LB-30 Liberator, 1942
- Boeing B-29 Superfortress, 1944–1953
- Boeing KC-135 Stratotanker, 1991–2008
- Boeing EC-135, 1991–1997
- Boeing EC-137 Stratoliner, 1991–1994
- Lockheed C-130J Hercules, C-130E, C-130H-3, 2008–2025
- Lockheed C-130E Hercules, 2008–2025
- Lockheed C-130H-3 Hercules, 2008–2025

=== Decorations ===
- Distinguished Unit Citations: Philippine Islands, 7 Dec 1941-10 May 1942; Philippine Islands, 8-22 Dec 1941; Philippine Islands and Netherlands Indies, 1 Jan-1 Mar 1942; Philippine Islands, 6 Jan-8 Mar 1942; Papua, 23 Jul-[Oct 1942]; New Britain, 7-12 Aug 1942; Japan, 9-19 Mar 1945; Kobe, Japan, 5 Jun 1945; Korea, 28 Jun-15 Sep 1950.
- Meritorious Unit Awards: 1 Jul 2006-30 June 2007; 1 Aug 2009-31 Jul 2011. Air Force Outstanding Unit Awards: 1 Jul 1993-30 Jun 1994; 1 Jul 1994-30 Jun 1996; 1 Jul 1998-30 Jun 1999; 1 Jul 1999-30 Jun 2000; 1 Jul 2000-30 Jun 2001; 1 Jul 2001-30 Jun 2002; 1 Jul 2002-30 Jun 2003; 1 Jul 2003-30 Jun 2004; 1 Jul 2004-30 Jun 2005; 1 Jul 2005-30 Jun 2006.
- Philippine Presidential Unit Citation (World War II).
- Republic of Korea Presidential Unit Citation: 7 Jul 1950-1 Jun 1953.
- Air Force Aviation Resource Management Annual Sergeant Dee Campbell Large Unit Award, 2016

== See also ==
- United States Army Air Forces in Australia
