= XXXX Corps =

XXXX Corps, XL Corps, or 40th Corps may refer to:

== Germany ==
- XXXX Reserve Corps, German Empire
- XXXX Panzer Corps, Wehrmacht

== Russia ==
- 40th Army Corps (Russian Empire)
- 40th Army Corps (Russian Federation)

== United Kingdom ==
- 40th (3rd Manchester) Lancashire Rifle Volunteer Corps
- 40th (Central London Rifle Rangers) Middlesex Rifle Volunteer Corps
- 40th Staffordshire Rifle Volunteer Corps
- 40th (Wath-upon-Dearne) Yorkshire West Riding Rifle Volunteer Corps

== See also ==
- List of military corps by number
- 40th Army (disambiguation)
- 40th Battalion (disambiguation)
- 40th Brigade (disambiguation)
- 40th Division (disambiguation)
- 40th Regiment (disambiguation)
- 40th Squadron (disambiguation)
- 40th (disambiguation)
- XL (disambiguation)
- XXXX (disambiguation)
