= 40th Army (disambiguation) =

The 40th Army was an army unit in the Soviet Union, active 1941–1945 and 1979 – c.1990

40th Army may also refer to:

- 40th Army (1941–1945), the Soviet Army during WWII
- 40th Group Army, People's Liberation Army, China
- Fortieth Army (Japan), Imperial Japanese Army

== See also ==
- List of armies by number
- 40th Division (disambiguation)
- 40th Brigade (disambiguation)
- 40th Regiment (disambiguation)
- 40th Battalion (disambiguation)
- 40th Squadron (disambiguation)
- 40th (disambiguation)
