= 40th Cavalry =

40th Cavalry may refer to:

- 40th Cavalry Regiment, U.S. Army
- 40th Virginia Cavalry Battalion, Confederate States Army
- 40th (Oxfordshire) Company, Imperial Yeomanry

== See also ==
- 40th Division (disambiguation)
- 40th Brigade (disambiguation)
- 40th Regiment (disambiguation)
- 40th (disambiguation)
