= 40th =

40th is the ordinal form of the number 40. 40th or Fortieth may also refer to:

- A fraction, 1/40, equal to one of 40 equal parts

== Geography ==
- 40th meridian east, a line of longitude
- 40th meridian west, a line of longitude
- 40th parallel north, a circle of latitude
- 40th parallel south, a circle of latitude
- 40th Street (disambiguation)

== Military ==
- 40th Battalion (disambiguation)
- 40th Brigade (disambiguation)
- 40th Division (disambiguation)
- 40th Regiment (disambiguation)
- 40th Squadron (disambiguation)

== Other ==
- 40th century
- 40th century BC

== See also ==
- 40 (disambiguation)
- The Fortieth Door, 1924 American adventure film serial
