= AGM-28 Hound Dog =

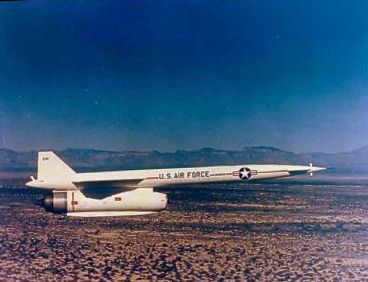
- AGM-28 in flight (showing the nose-high attitude)
- Type: Cruise missile
- Place of origin: United States

Service history
- In service: September 13, 1960

Production history
- Manufacturer: North American Aviation
- Unit cost: $690,073
- Produced: April 1959

Specifications
- Mass: 10,147 pounds (4,603 kg)
- Length: 42 feet 6 inches (12.95 m)
- Height: 9 feet 4 inches (2.84 m)
- Diameter: 28 inches (710 mm)
- Wingspan: 12 feet 2 inches (3.71 m)
- Warhead: 1,742 pounds (790 kg) W28 Class D nuclear warhead
- Detonation mechanism: Airburst or Contact
- Engine: Pratt & Whitney J52-P-3 turbojet; 7,500 lbf (33 kN).
- Operational range: 785 miles (1,263 km)
- Flight ceiling: 56,200 feet (17,100 m)
- Flight altitude: 200 to 56,000 feet (61 to 17,069 m)
- Maximum speed: Mach 2.1
- Guidance system: Astro-inertial guidance
- Launch platform: B-52 Stratofortress

The North American Aviation AGM-28 Hound Dog was a supersonic, turbojet-propelled, nuclear armed, air-launched cruise missile developed in 1959 for the United States Air Force. It was primarily designed to be capable of attacking Soviet ground-based air defense sites prior to a potential air attack by B-52 Stratofortress long range bombers during the Cold War. The Hound Dog was first given the designation B-77, then redesignated GAM-77, and finally AGM-28. It was conceived as a temporary standoff missile for the B-52, to be used until the GAM-87 Skybolt air-launched ballistic missile was available. Instead, the Skybolt was cancelled within a few years and the Hound Dog continued to be deployed for a total of 15 years until its replacement by newer missiles, including the AGM-69 SRAM and then the AGM-86 ALCM.

== Development ==
During the 1950s the US became aware of developments regarding the Soviet Union's surface-to-air missiles (SAMs), notably at large installations being constructed around Moscow. At the time, the entire nuclear deterrent of the United States was based on crewed strategic bombers, both with the U.S. Air Force and the U.S. Navy. The deployment of large numbers of SAMs placed this force at some risk of being rendered ineffective. One solution to this problem is to extend the range of the bomb, either through glide bomb techniques, or more practically, by mounting them in a short-to-medium-range missile. This allows the weapon to be fired while the bomber remains outside the range of the enemy's defensive missiles.

Since the Soviet air-defenses were static and easy to spot from aerial reconnaissance or satellite reconnaissance photos, the Air Force planned to use a long-range cruise missile to attack the air-defense bases before the bombers got within their range. The SA-2 Guideline missile had a maximum range of about 30 kilometers at that time. Since the bombers would be approaching the sites as the weapon flew towards it, their own guided missiles would have to be launched well before it entered this range. The weapon needed to fly fast enough and far enough that the bomber was at a safe distance when the weapon reached the target. If the American missile was to be used to attack enemy air bases as well, an extended range of several hundred kilometers would be needed due to the much longer range of the fighters compared to the SAMs.

"Operation Bluenose: AGM-28 Hound Dog Missile" (1960) - Official de-classified USAF AGM-28 information film-reel.

A missile with these capabilities was called for in General Operational Requirement 148, which was released on March 15, 1956, known as WS-131B. GOR 148 called for a supersonic air-to-surface cruise missile with a weight of not more than 12,500 pounds (5,700 kg) fully fueled and armed). Each B-52 Stratofortress would carry two of the missiles, one under each wing, on a pylon located between the B-52's fuselage and its inboard pair of engines.

Both Chance Vought and North American Aviation submitted GAM-77 proposals to the USAF in July 1957, and both based on their earlier work on long-range ground-launched cruise missiles. Vought's submission was for an air-launched version of the Regulus missile, developed for the US Navy, while North American's was adapted from their Navaho missile. On August 21, 1957, North American Aviation was awarded a contract to develop Weapon System 131B, which included the Hound Dog missile.

The importance of Hound Dog in penetrating the Soviet air-defense system was later described by Senator John F. Kennedy in a speech to the American Legion convention in Miami, Florida, on October 18, 1960: "We must take immediate steps to protect our present nuclear striking force from surprise attack. Today, more than 90 percent of our retaliatory capacity is made up of aircraft and missiles which have fixed, un-protectable bases whose location is known to the Russians. We can only do this by providing SAC with the capability of maintaining a continuous airborne alert, and by pressing projects such as the Hound Dog air-ground missile, which will enable crewed bombers to penetrate Soviet defenses with their weapons".

== Design ==
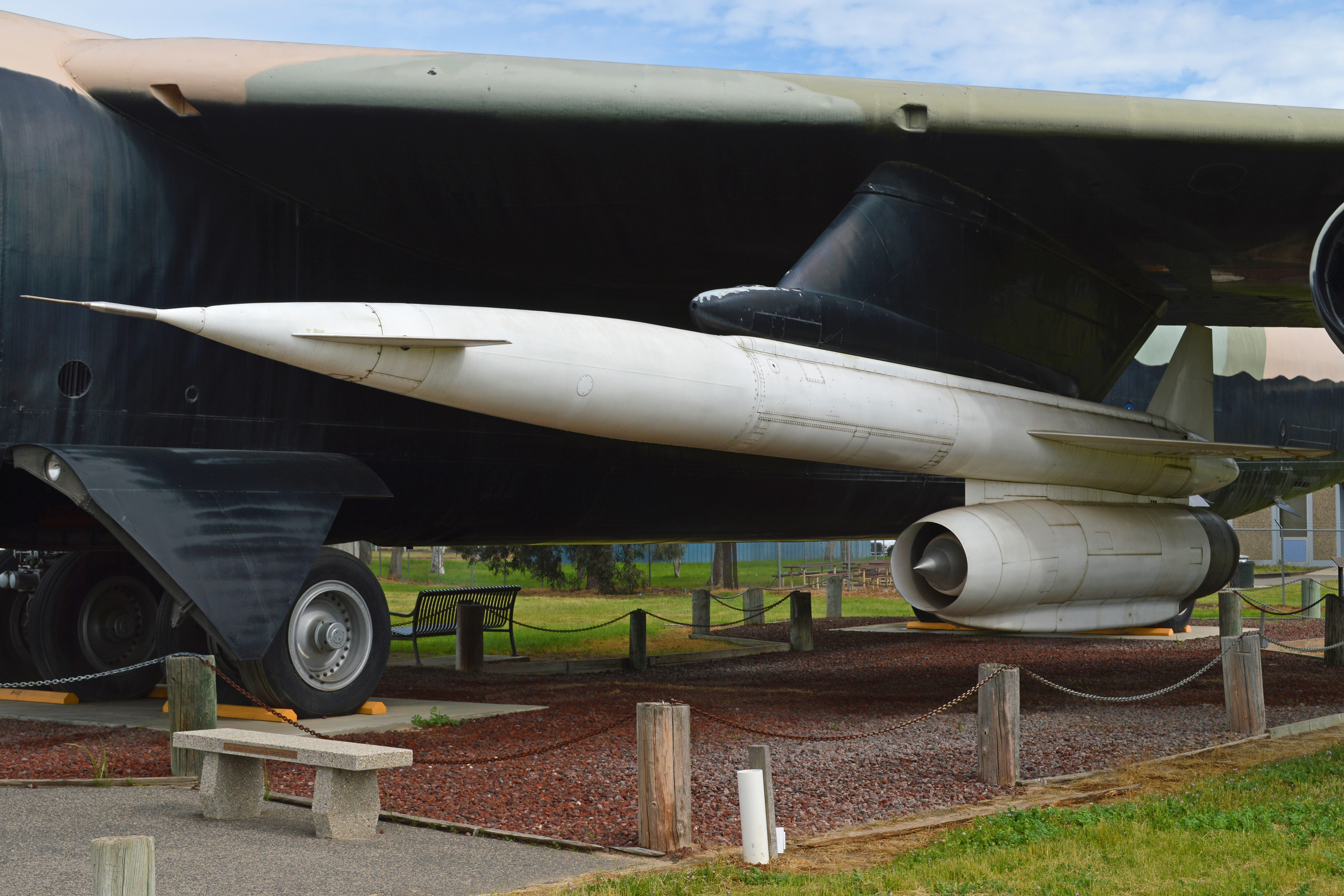
On the pylon, beneath a B-52 wing

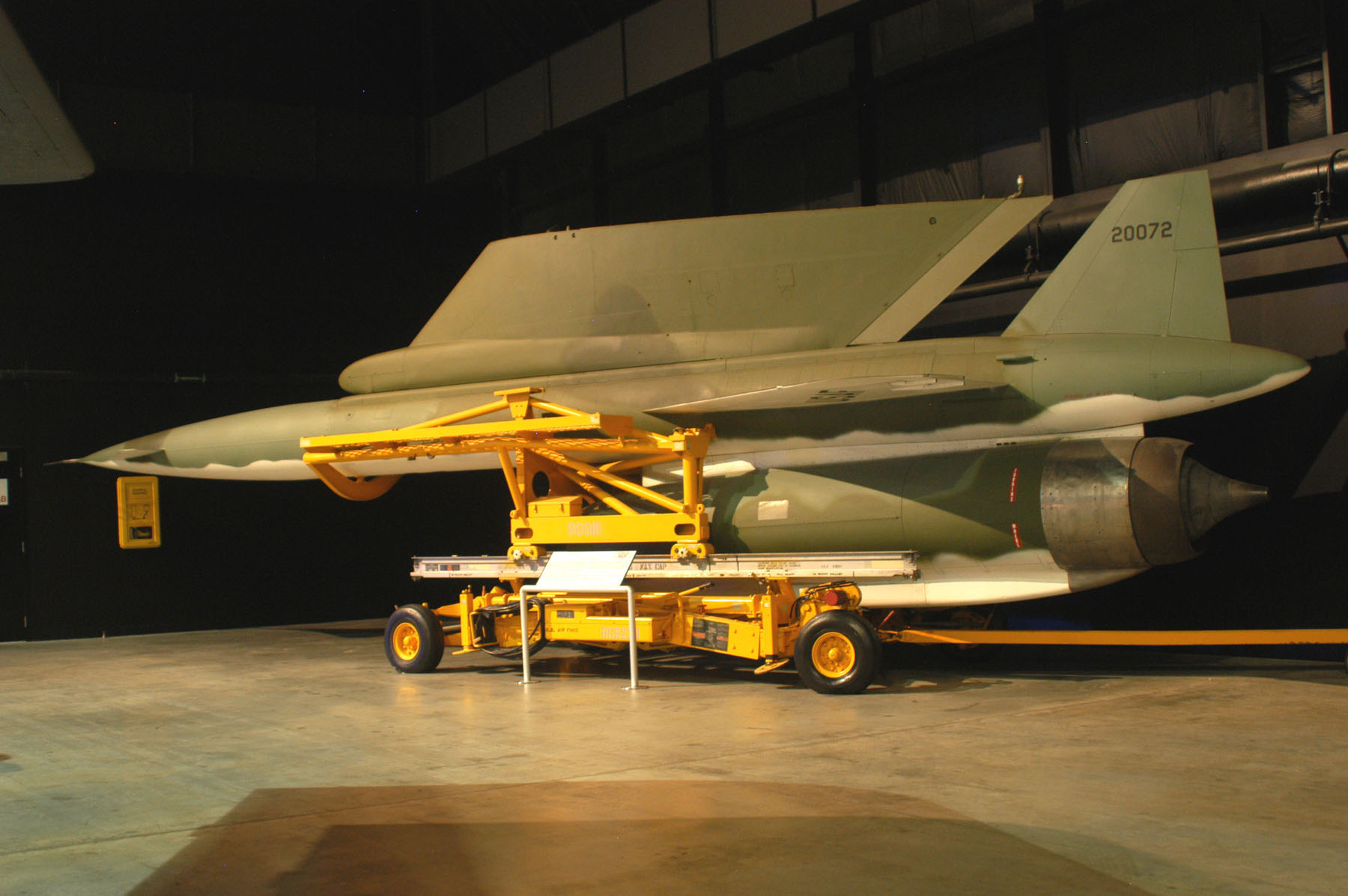
Hound Dog and its mounting pylon, which includes electronics and refueling systems

The Hound Dog missile's airframe was an adaptation of technology developed in the SM-64 Navaho missile, adapted for launching from the B-52. The Hound Dog's design was based on that of the Navaho G-38 missile, which featured small delta wings and forward canards. This layout had already been extensively tested with the smaller North American X-10, so the flying qualities of the larger but otherwise similar proposed layout were well understood.

A Pratt & Whitney J52-P-3 turbojet propelled the Hound Dog, instead of Navaho's ramjet engine. The J52 engine was located in a pod located beneath the rear fuselage. The J52-P-3 used in the Hound Dog, unlike J52s installed in aircraft like the A-4 Skyhawk or the A-6 Intruder, was optimized to run at maximum power during the missile's flight. As a result, the Hound Dog's version of the J52 had a short operating lifetime of only six hours. However, in combat, the Hound Dog was expected to self-destruct in less than six hours.

A derivative of the Navaho's NAA Autonetics Division N-6 inertial navigation system (INS), the N5G, was used in the Hound Dog. A star tracker manufactured by Kollsman Instruments Co. and located in the B-52's pylon was used to correct inertial navigation system orientation errors with celestial observations while the Hound Dog was being carried by the B-52. The INS could also be used to determine the bomber's position after the initial calibration and "leveling" process, which took about 90 minutes. The Hound Dog had a circular error probable (CEP) of 2.2 miles (3.5 km), which was acceptable for a weapon equipped with a nuclear warhead.

The thermonuclear warhead carried by the Hound Dog was the W28 Class D. The W28 warhead could be preset to yield an explosive power of between 70 kilotons and 1.45 megatons. Detonation of the Hound Dog's W28 warhead could be programmed to occur on impact (ground burst) or air burst at a preset altitude. An air burst would have been used against a large area, soft target. A surface impact would have been used against a hard target such as a missile site or command and control center.

The Hound Dog could be launched from the B-52 Stratofortress at high altitudes or low altitudes, but not below 5,000 feet (1,500 m) in altitude. Initially, three different flight profiles for the Hound Dog were available for selection by the commander and the bombardier of the bomber (though other options were added later):

- High-altitude attack: The Hound Dog would have flown at a high altitude (up to 56,000 feet (17,000 m) depending on the amount of jet fuel on board the missile) all the way to the immediate area of its target, then diving to its nuclear warhead's preset detonation altitude.
- Low-altitude attack: The Hound Dog would have flown at a low altitude – below 5,000 feet (1,500 m) (air-pressure altitude) to its target where its nuclear warhead would have detonated. In this mode of operation, the Hound Dog had a shortened range of about 400 miles (640 km) when this flight profile was used. The missile would not carry out terrain following in this flight profile. No major terrain obstructions could exist at the preset altitude along the missile's flight path.
- Low-altitude attack: The GAM-77B (later AGM-28B) could fly a low radar altitude, from 3,000 to 100 feet (914 to 30 m) above the ground. As mentioned above in the GAM-77A model description, this shortened range. However, the improvement of "flying in the weeds", was such that the missile could be flown down in ground clutter (radar) thus nearly invisible to radar detection. Eventually, all A model GAM-77s were given this modification as well.
- A dogleg attack: The Hound Dog would have flown along a designated heading (at either high or low altitudes) to a preset location. At that location the missile would have turned left or right and then proceeded to its target. The intention of this maneuver was to attempt to draw defensive fighter planes away from the missile's target.

The first air-drop test of a dummy Hound Dog was carried out in November 1958. 52 GAM-77A missiles were launched for testing and training purposes between April 23, 1959, and August 30, 1965. Hound Dog launches occurred at Cape Canaveral Air Force Station, at Eglin Air Force Base, Florida, and at White Sands Missile Range, New Mexico.

The Hound Dog missile's development was completed in only 30 months. North American received a production contract to build Hound Dogs on October 16, 1958. The first production Hound Dog missile was then delivered to the Air Force on December 21, 1959. 722 Hound Dog missiles were produced by North American Aviation before its production of them ended in March 1963.

In May 1961, an improved Hound Dog missile was test-flown for the first time. This upgrade incorporated improvements to reduce its radar cross-section. The Hound Dog already had a low head-on radar cross-section because of its highly swept delta wings. This low radar cross-section was lowered further by replacing its nose cap, engine intake spike, and engine duct with new radar-absorbent material components that scattered or absorbed radar energy. It has been reported that these radar cross-section improvements were removed as Hound Dogs were withdrawn from service.

The GAM-77A version of the GAM-77 also included a new Kollsman Instruments KS-140 star tracker that was integrated with the N-6 inertial navigation system. This unit replaced the star tracker that had been located in the B-52's wing pylon. The fuel capacity of the GAM-77A was increased during this upgrade. A radar altimeter was added to the missile to provide (vertical) terrain-following radar capability to the Hound Dog. 428 Hound Dog missiles were upgraded to the GAM-77A configuration by North American.

66 GAM-77A Hound Dog missiles were launched for testing and training up through April 1973.

In June 1963 the GAM-77 and GAM-77A were re-designated AGM-28A and AGM-28B, respectively.

In 1971, a Hound Dog missile was test-flown with a newly developed Terrain Contour Matching (TERCOM) navigation system. Reportedly, the designation AGM-28C was reserved for this version of the Hound Dog if development had been continued. While a Hound Dog with TERCOM was never deployed, this technology, with much better electronics and digital computers, was later used in both the Air Force's Air Launched Cruise Missile and the Navy's Tomahawk.

In 1972, the Bendix Corporation was awarded a contract to develop an anti-radiation missile passive radar seeker to guide the Hound Dog missile to antennas transmitting radar signals. A Hound Dog with this radar seeker was test-flown in 1973, but never mass-produced.

== Operational history ==
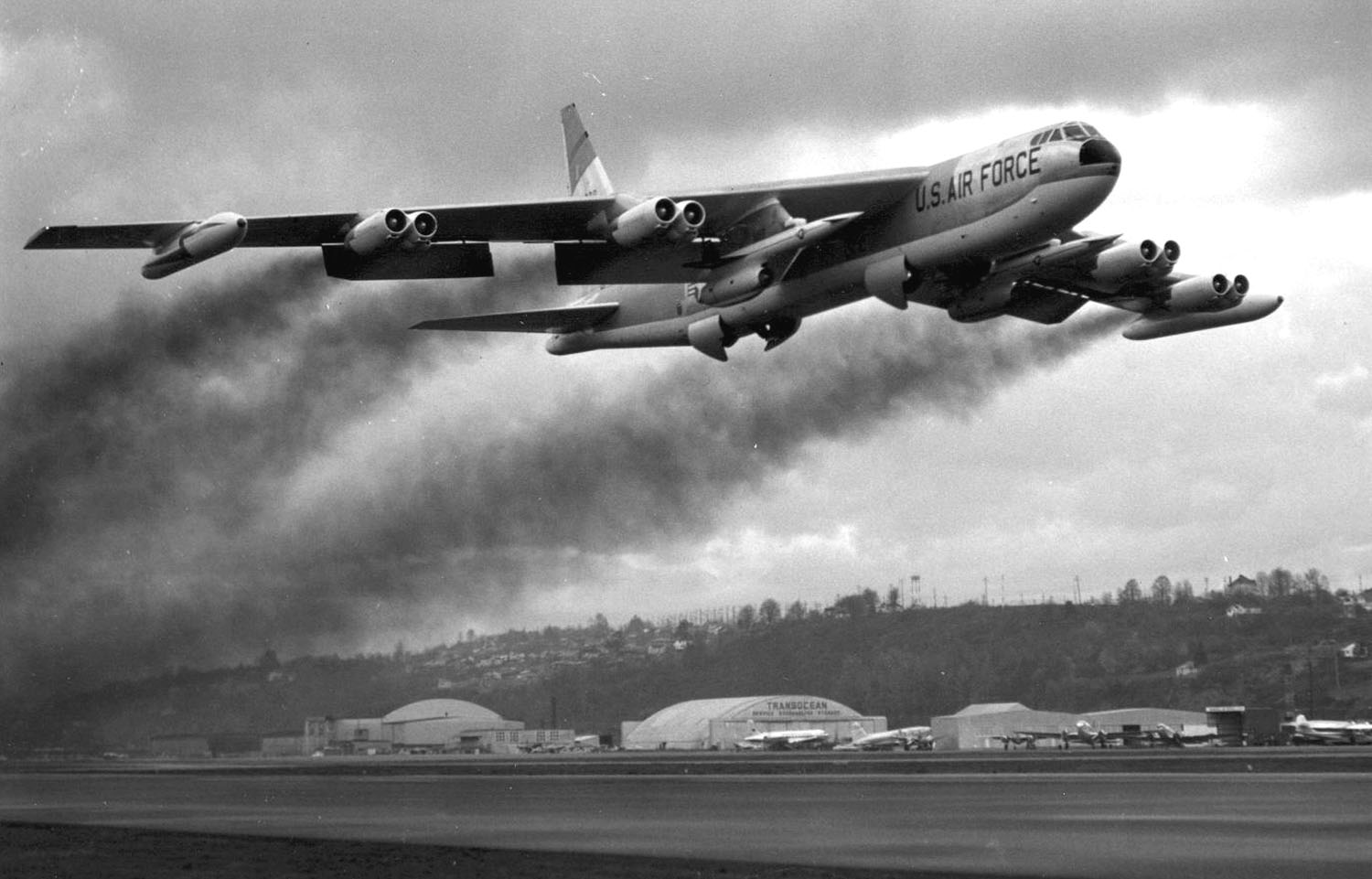
B-52F takeoff with AGM-28 Hound Dog missiles

On December 21, 1959, General Thomas S. Power, the Commander in Chief of the U.S. Air Force's Strategic Air Command (SAC), formally accepted the first production Hound Dog missile. Just two months later in February, SAC test-launched its first unarmed Hound Dog at Eglin Air Force Base.

In July 1960, the Hound Dog reached initial operational capability with the first B-52 unit. In November 1960, the 97th Bombardment Wing at Blytheville Air Force Base, Arkansas became the first combat wing in SAC to be equipped with the missile. The first test flight at the base took place on November 16, 1960. The Hound Dog was used on airborne alert for the first time in January 1962. In 1962, SAC activated missile maintenance squadrons to provide maintenance for both the Hound Dog and the ADM-20 Quail decoy missile. Full operational capability was achieved in August 1963 when 29 B-52 bomber wings were operational with the Hound Dog.

In 1960, SAC developed procedures so that the B-52 could use the Hound Dog's J52 engine for additional thrust while the missile was located on the bomber's two pylons. This helped heavily laden B-52s fly away from their airbases faster, before enemy nuclear weapons obliterated them. The Hound Dog could then be refueled from the B-52's wing fuel tanks.

One Hound Dog missile crashed near the town of Samson, Alabama, when it failed to self-destruct after a test launch from Eglin Air Force Base. In 1962, a Hound Dog was accidentally dropped to the ground during an underwing systems check.

AGM-28: Quickest Draw In The West (1970) De-classified official Strategic Air Command promotional film reel.

In May 1962, operation "Silk Hat" was conducted at Eglin Air Force Base. During this exercise, a Hound Dog test launch was conducted before an audience of national and international dignitaries headed by President John F. Kennedy and Vice-President Lyndon B. Johnson.

On September 22, 1966, Secretary of Defense Robert McNamara recommended retiring all of the remaining Hound Dog missiles within a few years. The Hound Dogs would be retained pending the outcome of the Terrain Contour Matching (TERCOM) guidance system development program. Secretary McNamara's recommendation was not acted upon, and the Hound Dog remained in service.

After thirteen years of service with the Air Force, the last Hound Dog missile was removed from alert deployment on June 30, 1975. The Hound Dog missiles were kept in dead storage for a number of years. The last Hound Dog was retired for scrapping on June 15, 1978, from the 42nd Bomb Wing at Loring Air Force Base, Maine.

No Hound Dog missile was ever used in combat, since it was strictly a weapon for nuclear warfare.

Missile tail numbers
GAM-77	GAM-77A
59-2791 to 59–2867	60–5574 to 60–5603
60–2078 to 60–2247	60–6691 to 60–6699
	61–2118 to 61–2357
	62–0030 to 62–0206

=== Numbers in service ===
The number of Hound Dog missiles in service, by year:

1959	1960	1961	1962	1963	1964	1965	1966	1967	1968	1969	1970	1971	1972	1973	1974	1975	1976	1977	1978
1	54	230	547	593	593	542	548	477	312	349	345	340	338	329	327	308	288	249	0

== Variants ==
- XGAM-77 — 25 prototype missiles produced
- GAM-77 — 697 missiles produced.
- GAM-77A — 452 missiles upgraded from GAM-77 to GAM-77A configuration.
- AGM-28A — The GAM-77 was redesignated the AGM-28A in June 1963
- AGM-28B — The GAM-77A was redesignated the AGM-28B in June 1963
- AGM-28C — Proposed Hound Dog that would have been equipped with a TERCOM guidance system.

== Operator ==
United States

- United States Air Force

=== Units using the Hound Dog ===
- 2d Bombardment Wing – Barksdale AFB, Louisiana
  - 20th Bombardment Squadron
  - 62d Bombardment Squadron
  - 596th Bombardment Squadron
- 5th Bombardment Wing, Heavy – Travis AFB, California / Minot AFB, North Dakota
  - 23d Bombardment Squadron
- 6th Bombardment Wing, Heavy – Walker AFB, New Mexico
  - 24th Bombardment Squadron
  - 40th Bombardment Squadron
- 11th Bombardment Wing, Heavy – Altus AFB, Oklahoma
  - 26th Bombardment Squadron
- 17th Bombardment Wing, Heavy – Wright-Patterson AFB, Ohio
  - 34th Bombardment Squadron
- 19th Bombardment Wing, Heavy – Homestead AFB, Florida / Robins AFB Georgia
  - 28th Bombardment Squadron
- 28th Bombardment Wing, Heavy – Ellsworth AFB, South Dakota
  - 77th Bombardment Squadron
- 39th Bombardment Wing – Eglin AFB, Florida
  - 62d Bombardment Squadron
- 42d Bombardment Wing, Heavy – Loring AFB, Maine
  - 69th Bombardment Squadron
  - 70th Bombardment Squadron
- 68th Bombardment Wing – Seymour Johnson AFB, North Carolina
  - 51st Bombardment Squadron
- 70th Bombardment Wing – Clinton-Sherman AFB, Oklahoma
  - 6th Bombardment Squadron
- 72d Bombardment Wing, Heavy – Ramey AFB, Puerto Rico
  - 60th Bombardment Squadron
- 92d Bombardment Wing, Heavy – Fairchild AFB, Washington
  - 325th Bombardment Squadron
- 97th Bombardment Wing, Heavy – Blytheville AFB, Arkansas
  - 340th Bombardment Squadron
- 306th Bombardment Wing – McCoy AFB, Florida
  - 367th Bombardment Squadron
- 319th Bombardment Wing, Heavy – Grand Forks AFB, North Dakota
  - 46th Bombardment Squadron
- 320th Bombardment Wing – Mather AFB, California
  - 441st Bombardment Squadron
- 340th Bombardment Wing – Bergstrom AFB, Texas
  - 486th Bombardment Squadron
- 379th Bombardment Wing, Heavy – Wurtsmith AFB, Michigan
  - 524th Bombardment Squadron
- 397th Bombardment Wing – Dow AFB, Maine
  - 341st Bombardment Squadron
- 410th Bombardment Wing – K. I. Sawyer AFB, Michigan
  - 644th Bombardment Squadron
- 416th Bombardment Wing – Griffiss AFB, New York
  - 668th Bombardment Squadron
- 449th Bombardment Wing – Kincheloe AFB, Michigan
  - 716th Bombardment Squadron
- 450th Bombardment Wing – Minot AFB, North Dakota
  - 721st Bombardment Squadron
- 454th Bombardment Wing – Columbus AFB, Mississippi
  - 736th Bombardment Squadron
- 456th Bombardment Wing – Beale AFB, California
  - 744th Bombardment Squadron
- 465th Bombardment Wing – Robins AFB Georgia
  - 781st Bombardment Squadron
- 484th Bombardment Wing – Turner AFB Georgia
  - 864th Bombardment Squadron
- 4038th Strategic Wing – Dow AFB, Maine
  - 341st Bombardment Squadron
- 4039th Strategic Wing – Griffiss AFB, New York
  - 75th Bombardment Squadron
- 4042d Strategic Wing – K.I. Sawyer AFB, Michigan
  - 526th Bombardment Squadron
- 4043d Strategic Wing – Wright-Patterson AFB, Ohio
  - 42d Bombardment Squadron
- 4047th Strategic Wing – McCoy AFB, Florida
  - 347th Bombardment Squadron
- 4123d Strategic Wing – Clinton-Sherman AFB, Oklahoma
  - 98th Bombardment Squadron
- 4126th Strategic Wing – Beale AFB, California
  - 31st Bombardment Squadron – Beale AFB, California
- 4130th Strategic Wing – Bergstrom AFB, Texas
  - 335th Bombardment Squadron
- 4133d Strategic Wing – Grand Forks AFB, North Dakota
  - 30th Bombardment Squadron
- 4134th Strategic Wing – Mather AFB, California
  - 72d Bombardment Squadron
- 4135th Strategic Wing – Eglin AFB, Florida
  - 301st Bombardment Squadron
- 4136th Strategic Wing – Minot AFB, North Dakota
  - 525th Bombardment Squadron
- 4137th Strategic Wing – Robins AFB, Georgia
  - 342d Bombardment Squadron
- 4138th Strategic Wing – Turner AFB, Georgia
  - 336th Bombardment Squadron
- 4228th Strategic Wing – Columbus AFB, Mississippi
  - 492d Bombardment Squadron
- 4238th Strategic Wing – Barksdale AFB, Louisiana
  - 436th Bombardment Squadron
- 4239th Strategic Wing – Kincheloe AFB, Michigan
  - 93d Bombardment Squadron
- 4241st Strategic Wing – Seymour Johnson AFB, North Carolina
  - 73d Bombardment Squadron

== Surviving missiles ==
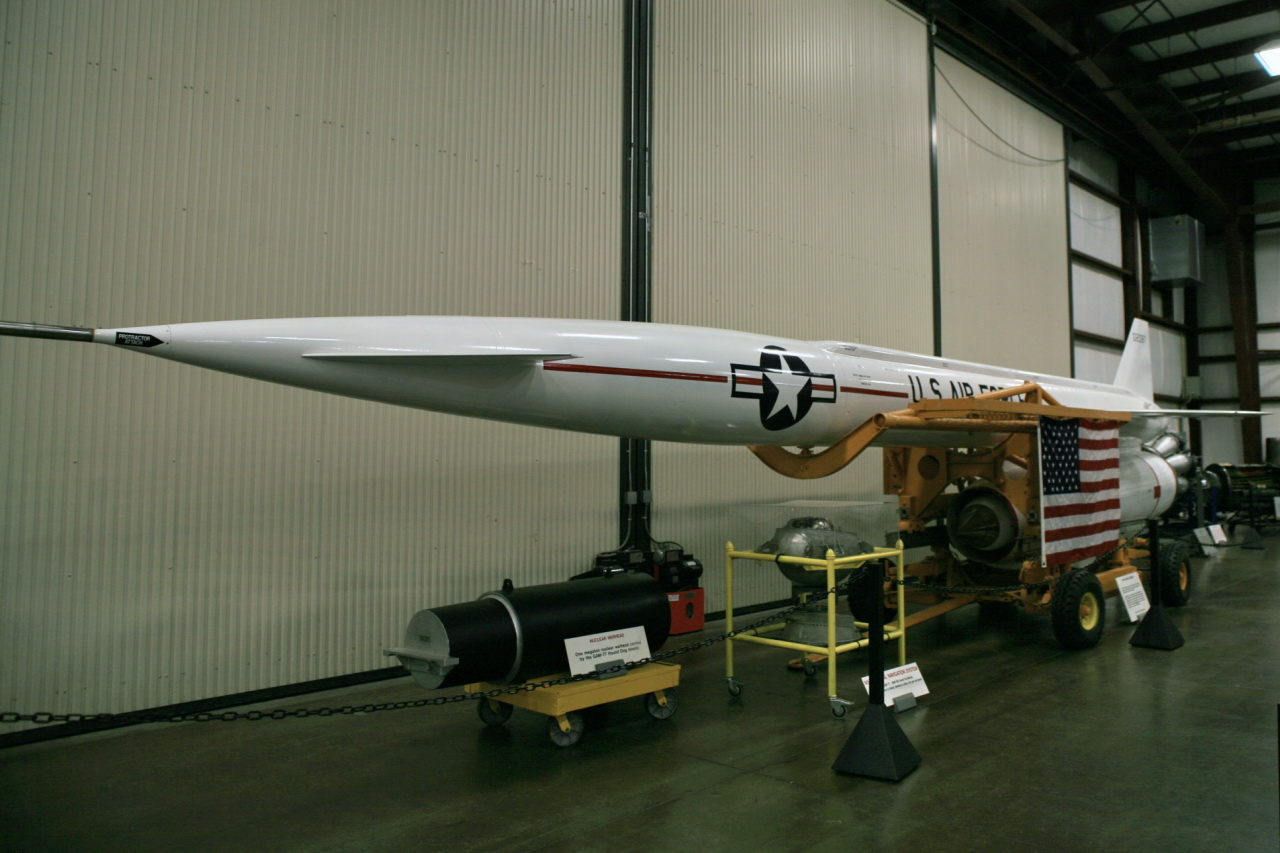
Display missile at the New England Air Museum, Connecticut.The black cylinder below represents the W-28 nuclear warhead.

All of the surviving missiles are located in the contiguous United States.

- AGM-28 S/N 60-2176 located at the Eighth Air Force Museum, Barksdale Air Force Base, Bossier City, Louisiana
- AGM-28 located at the Aerospace Museum of California, former McClellan Air Force Base, Sacramento, California
- AGM-28 S/N 33792 located at the Air Force Space & Missile Museum, Cape Canaveral Air Force Station, Florida
- AGM-28 S/N 62-0003 located at the Castle Air Museum, former Castle Air Force Base, Atwater, California
- AGM-28 S/N 60-2192 located at the Dyess Linear Air Park, Dyess Air Force Base, Texas
- AGM-28 marked as S/N 59-2794, located at the Air Force Armament Museum, Eglin Air Force Base, Florida
- AGM-28 located at Grand Forks Air Force Base, North Dakota
- AGM-28 located at the Joe Davies Heritage Airpark, Air Force Plant 42, Palmdale, California
- AGM-28 located at Mars Hill Town Park, Mars Hill, North Carolina
- AGM-28 S/N 61-2206 located at Minot Air Force Base, North Dakota
- AGM-28 S/N 60-2141 located at the National Atomic Museum, adjacent to Kirtland Air Force Base, Albuquerque, New Mexico
- AGM-28 S/N 62-0072 located at the National Museum of the United States Air Force, Wright-Patterson Air Force Base, Dayton, Ohio. It was transferred to the museum in 1975.
- AGM-28 S/N 60-505 located at the New England Air Museum, Windsor Locks, Connecticut
- AGM-28 S/N 59-2796 Museum of Aviation, Robins Air Force Base, Warner Robins, Georgia. Formerly at Octave Chanute Aerospace Museum, former Chanute Air Force Base, Rantoul, Illinois.
- AGM-28 S/N 59-2866 located at the Pima Air & Space Museum, adjacent to Davis-Monthan Air Force Base, Tucson, Arizona
- AGM-28 S/N 60-2092 located at the Pima Air & Space Museum, adjacent to Davis-Monthan Air Force Base, Tucson, Arizona
- AGM-28 located at the Pratt & Whitney Engine Museum and Hangar, East Hartford, Connecticut
- AGM-28 located at Veterans Park in Presque Isle, Maine
- GAM-77 S/N 61-2213 located in front of the Loring Military Heritage Center, on former Loring AFB, Limestone, Maine.
- AGM-28 S/N 61-2148 located at the Museum of Aviation, Robins Air Force Base, Georgia
- AGM-28 S/N 59-2791 located at the South Dakota Air and Space Museum, Ellsworth Air Force Base, Rapid City, South Dakota
- AGM-28 S/N 60-2110 located at the U.S. Space and Rocket Center, Huntsville, Alabama
- AGM-28 located at the Strategic Air Command & Aerospace Museum, adjacent to Ashland, Nebraska
- AGM-28 located at the American Legion in Tecumseh, Oklahoma
- XGAM-77 located at the Travis Air Museum, Travis Air Force Base, California
- AGM-28 S/N 59-2847 located at the Veterans Home of Wyoming in Buffalo, Wyoming
- AGM-28 located at the White Sands Missile Range Missile Park, New Mexico
- AGM-28 S/N 60-2971 located at the Wings of Eagles Discovery Center, Horseheads, New York

== Popular culture ==
Where it received the name Hound Dog has been the source of argument for decades. In recent years, however, people have given credit to fans in the Air Force of Elvis Presley's version of "Hound Dog". When the missile was flying at low altitude (200 ft) in test flights using ground avoidance radar, it followed the terrain, often in a soft rise and fall pattern, much like a hound dog when chasing prey.

== See also ==
Aircraft of comparable role, configuration, and era

- P-270 Moskit
- Raduga Kh-20
- Blue Steel (missile)

Related lists

- List of military aircraft of the United States
- List of missiles
