= Forty Mile =

Forty Mile, Fortymile, or variation, may refer to:

== Australia ==
- Forty Mile, Queensland, a locality in the Shire of Mareeba
- Forty Mile Scrub National Park, park in Queensland

== North America ==
- Fortymile River, a tributary of the Yukon River in Alaska (USA) and the Yukon (CanadA)

=== Canada ===
- Forty Mile, Yukon, a ghost town in Yukon
- Fortymile, Yukon; a former community; see List of communities in Yukon
- County of Forty Mile No. 8, a municipal district in Alberta

=== United States ===
- Forty Mile Point Light, a lighthouse in Michigan
- Lahontan Valley, known as the Forty Mile Desert during the era of the California Trail

== See also ==
- Forty (disambiguation)
- Mile (disambiguation)
