= 40th Street station =

40th Street station may refer to:

- 40th Street station (BMT Fifth Avenue Line), a former elevated station in Brooklyn, New York
- 40th Street station (SEPTA), a subway station in Philadelphia, Pennsylvania
- 40th Street–Lowery Street station, an elevated station in Queens, New York
- 40th Street Portal, a light rail stop in Philadelphia, Pennsylvania

== See also ==
- 40th Street (disambiguation)
