= 449th Air Expeditionary Group =

449th Air Expeditionary Group

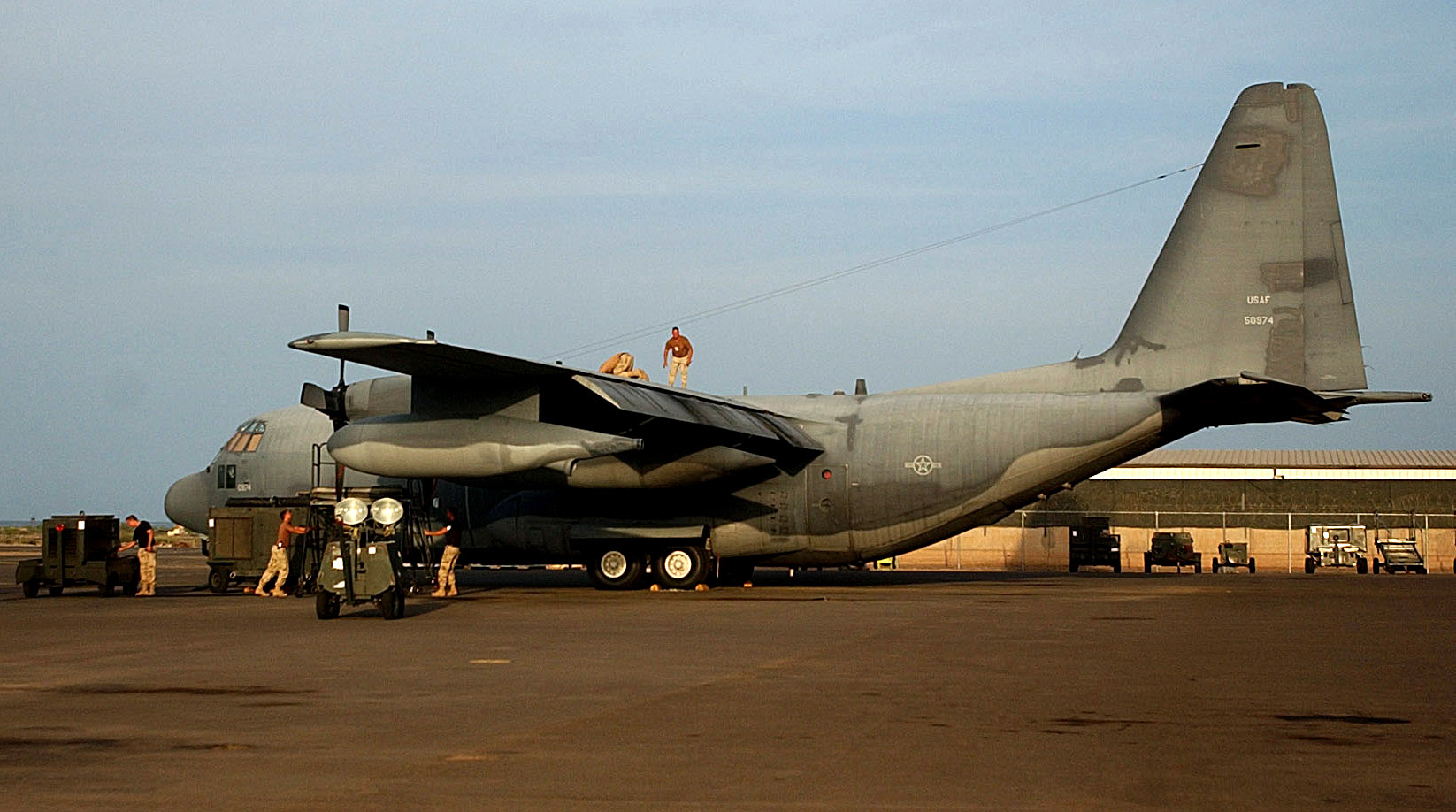
- Airmen from the 449th Expeditionary Rescue Squadron prepare an HC-130 for a Combined Task Force-Horn of Africa mission.
- Active: 1943–1946; 1963–1977; 2005-present
- Country: United States
- Branch: United States Air Force
- Part of: United States Air Forces in Europe – Air Forces Africa: Third Air Force; 406th Air Expeditionary Wing
- Garrison/HQ: Camp Lemonnier, Djibouti
- Nickname: Flying Horsemen World War II
- Motto: Nunquam non Paratus (Latin for 'Never Unprepared')
- Engagements: Mediterranean Theater of Operations; Global war on terrorism
- Decorations: Distinguished Unit Citation; Air Force Outstanding Unit Award

Commanders
- Current commander: Col. Andrew Crabtree
- Notable commanders: Darr H. Alkire

Insignia
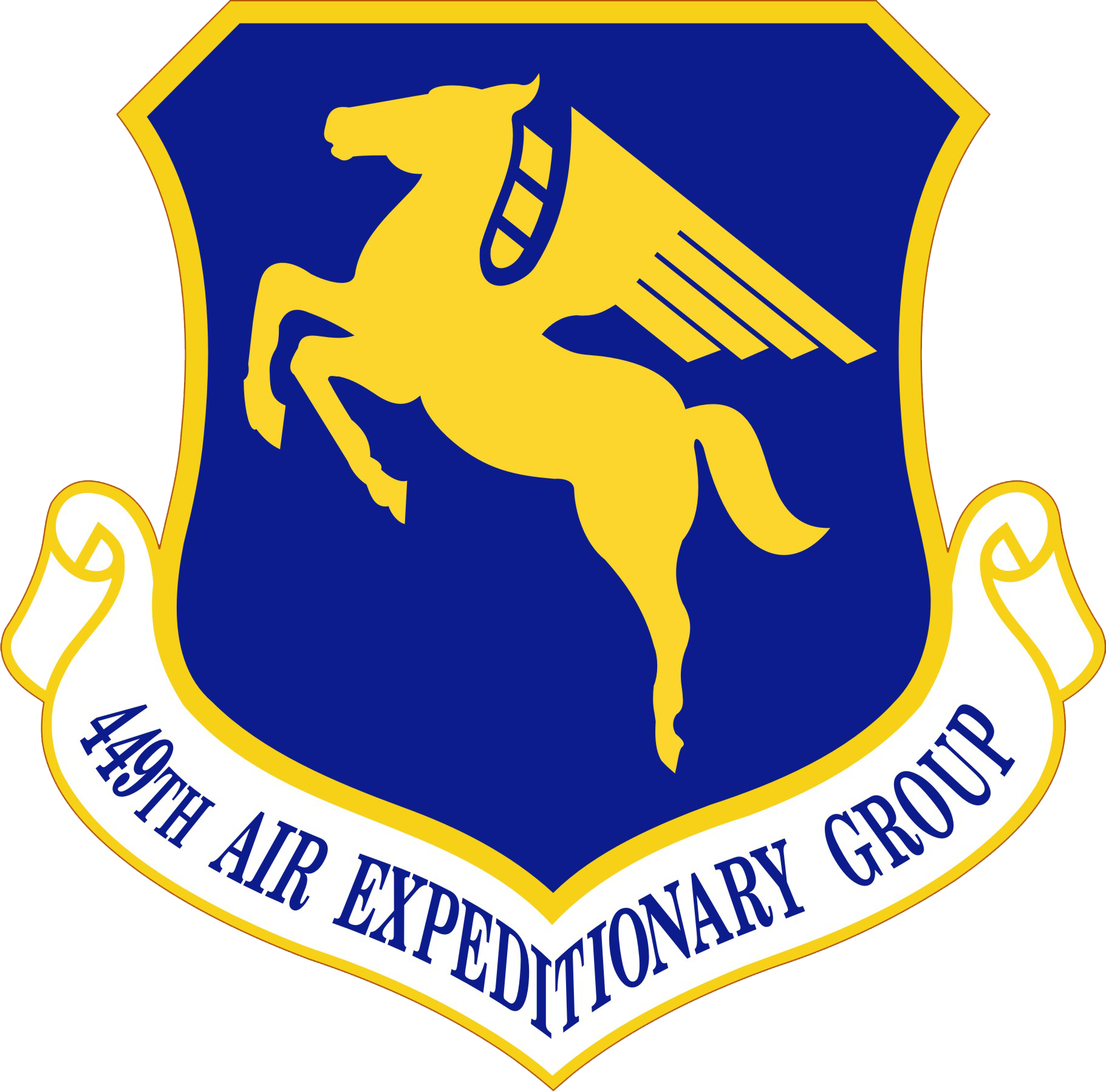
- 449th Air Expeditionary Group Emblem
- World War II Tail marking: Upward-pointing black triangle outline within a white circle

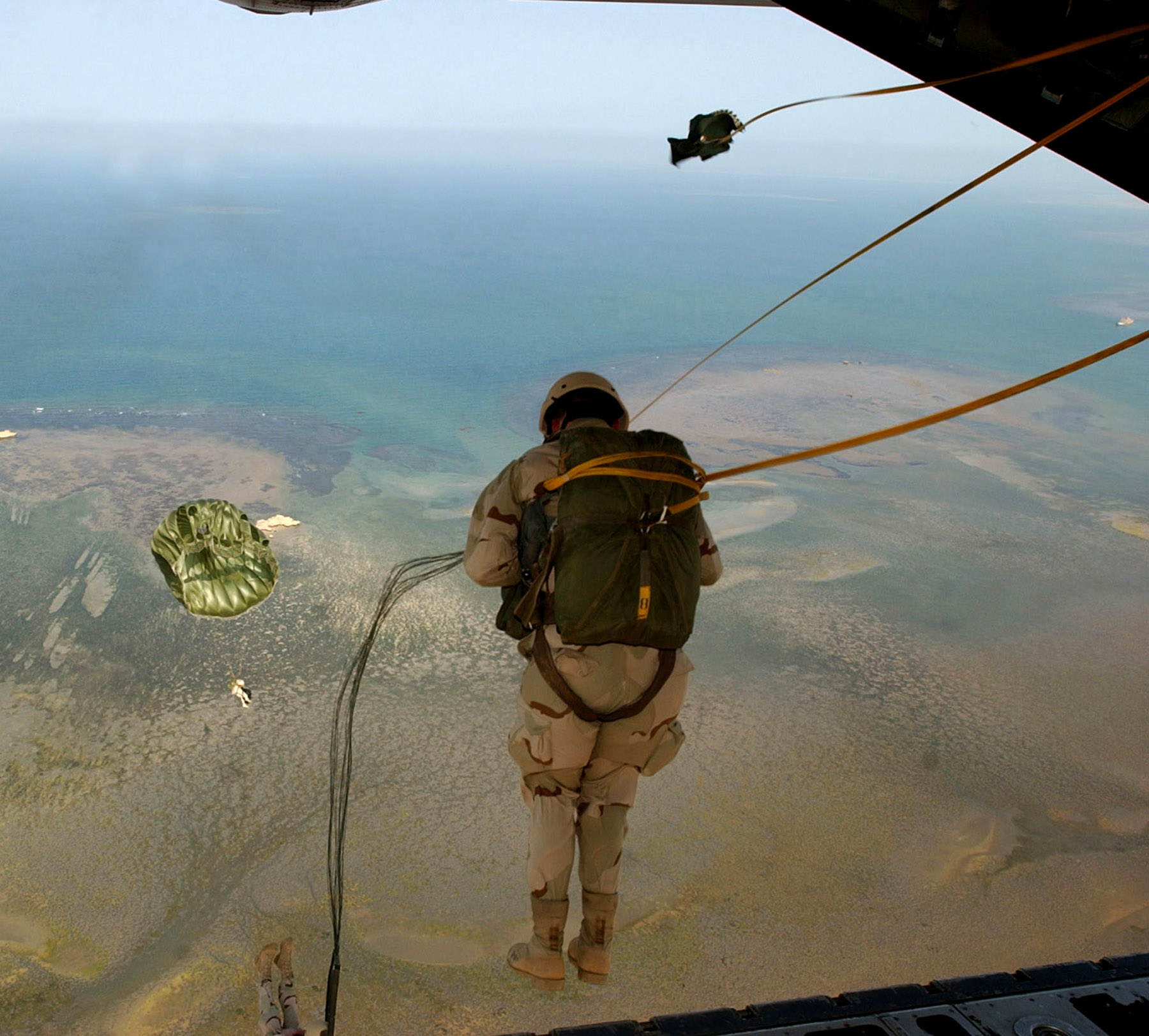
A pararescueman from the 131st Rescue Squadron jumps from an HC-130 during a training mission recently. The 131st works with the 449th Air Expeditionary Group

The 449th Air Expeditionary Group is a provisional United States Air Force unit assigned to the Third Air Force supporting United States Africa Command. It is stationed at Camp Lemonnier, Djibouti. It flies missions for Africa Command and Combined Joint Task Force – Horn of Africa, supporting varied U.S. objectives in the area.

The group began as the World War II 449th Bombardment Group (Heavy) in the spring of 1943. The group prepared for combat with Consolidated B-24 Liberator strategic heavy bombers. It moved to Italy by January 1944, and was assigned to the 47th Bombardment Wing of Fifteenth Air Force. It bombed oil refineries, communications centers, aircraft factories, and industrial areas in Italy, Germany, Austria, Czechoslovakia, Hungary, Rumania, Bulgaria, Albania, and Greece, and earned two Distinguished Unit Citations in combat. After returning to the United States at the end of May 1945, the unit was assigned to Second Air Force, transitioned to B-29 Superfortresses, and was redesignated a Very Heavy bomb group.

In the postwar era, the 449th Bombardment Group was one of the original ten bombardment groups assigned to Strategic Air Command (SAC). The unit was inactivated on 4 August 1946 at Grand Island Army Air Field, Nebraska and its mission, aircraft, and personnel were transferred to the 28th Bombardment Group which was simultaneously activated.

The 449th Bombardment Wing, Heavy was activated in 1963 at Kincheloe AFB, Michigan, assuming the mission, aircraft and equipment of the 4239th Strategic Wing and trained for strategic operations flying Boeing B-52 Stratofortresses and Boeing KC-135 Stratotankers as part of Strategic Air Command. The wing inactivated in 1977 with the closure of Kincheloe AFB.

In 1985 the group and the wing were consolidated, but remained inactive. In 2003 the unit was redesignated as the 449th Air Expeditionary Group and was assigned to United States Air Forces Europe (USAFE) to activate or inactivate as needed. Since 2008, the unit has controlled USAF activities in the Horn of Africa.

== Units ==
The 449th AEG is currently made up of:

- 12th Special Operations Squadron (Expeditionary SOS) (Chabelley Airfield, Djibouti)
- 75th Expeditionary Airlift Squadron
- 82nd Expeditionary Rescue Squadron
- 475th Expeditionary Air Base Squadron (Manda Bay Airfield, Kenya)
- 726th Expeditionary Mission Support Squadron
- 776th Expeditionary Air Base Squadron (Chabelley Airfield, Djibouti)

== History ==
=== World War II ===
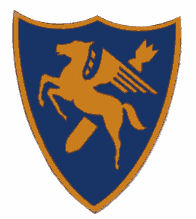
Emblem of the 449th Bombardment Group

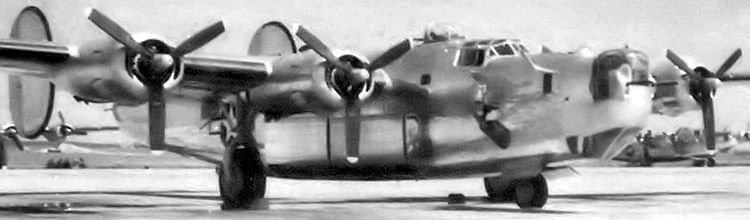
717th Bomb Squadron B-24J 42-51327 at Bruning AAF just after delivery from Douglas-Tulsa where it was manufactured.

The group was constituted as 449th Bombardment Group (Heavy) on 6 April 1943 and activated on 1 May at Davis–Monthan Field, Arizona. its original components were the 716th, 717th, 718th, and 719th Bombardment Squadrons.

It was assigned to II Bomber Command for combat training with B-24 Liberators. The first morning report was issued on 27 May 1943and listed as 52 officers and 33 enlisted men available for duty. Over the next seven months the Group steadily increased to full strength as the training program progressed. In July 1943 the group moved to Alamogordo Army Airfield, New Mexico where second phase training was performed. In September the group again relocated, this time to Bruning Army Air Field, Nebraska. The move to Bruning was completed on 18 September 1943. At that time the 449th consisted of a total complement of 184 officers and 1,203 enlisted men. At Bruning the group received its new operational Consolidated B-24 Liberators.

By December 1943, training was complete and the 449th was ordered overseas to the Mediterranean Theater of Operations (MTO). Each crew flew its aircraft overseas by the South Atlantic Transport Route which took them to Morrison Field, Florida, then to Puerto Rico and Brazil. The Atlantic crossing was made from Brazil to Dakar, French West Africa. From Dakar the planes flew north to Tunis by way of Marrakesh. From Tunis they flew to their forward operating base at Grottaglie Airfield near Taranto, Italy. The 449th was assigned to the 47th Bombardment Wing of the Fifteenth Air Force.

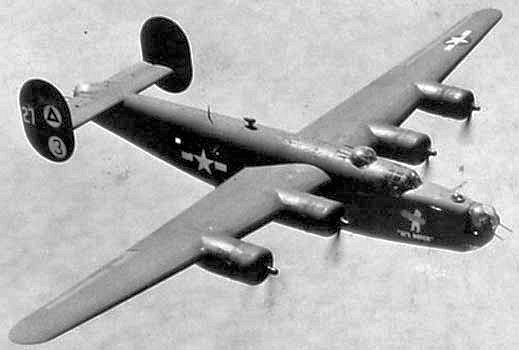
718th Bomb Squadron B-24J 42-64362 in flight over Europe, 1944

The group was a strategic bombardment organization, and bombed oil refineries, communications centers, aircraft factories, and industrial areas in Italy, Germany, Austria, Czechoslovakia, Hungary, Romania, Bulgaria, Albania, and Greece.

The group received a Distinguished Unit Citation (DUC) for a mission on 4 April 1944 when the group, flying without escort, raided marshalling yards in Bucharest. Although heavily outnumbered by German fighters, the group succeeded not only in bombing the target but also in destroying many of the enemy interceptors. Received another DUC for action on 9 July 1944 when the group flew through heavy smoke and intense enemy fire to attack an oil refinery at Ploiești. Other operations of the group included bombing gun emplacements in southern France in preparation for the invasion in August 1944, and attacking troop concentrations, bridges, and viaducts in April 1945 to assist Allied forces in northern Italy.

The group was ordered back to the United States during May after the German capitulation. The 449th was redesignated a Very Heavy bombardment group and was programmed for very long range strategic bombardment operations against the Japanese Home Islands using Boeing B-29 Superfortresses. Many personnel were demobilized upon arrival at the port of embarkation; a small cadre of key personnel was formed and the group was then established at Sioux Falls Army Air Field, South Dakota in late May where the group was reformed with new personnel.

After a period of organization, the group moved to Dalhart Army Air Field, Texas, where initial training was conducted with former II Bomber Command B-17 Flying Fortress; B-25 Mitchells and some B-29s. As the group was so far along in training, it moved to Grand Island Army Air Field, Nebraska in September where it became a regular unit of Continental Air Forces, receiving some of the last new B-29 aircraft manufactured by Boeing. In November, its 719th squadron was converted to a reconnaissance unit and redesignated the 46th Reconnaissance Squadron, Very Long Range (Photographic-Weather).

On 21 March 1946, the 449th Bombardment Group became one of the initial ten B-29 groups assigned to Strategic Air Command (SAC). The group was inactivated on 4 August 1946 and its personnel, mission, and equipment were reassigned to the 28th Bombardment Group.

=== Strategic Air Command ===
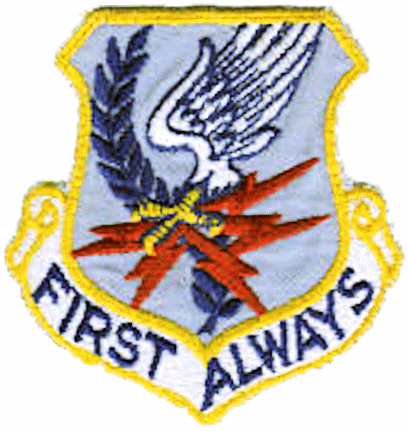
Emblem of the 4239th Strategic Wing

==== 4239th Strategic Wing ====
The origins of the 449th Bombardment Wing began on 1 July 1959 when SAC established the 4239th Strategic Wing (SW) at Kincheloe AFB, Michigan, an Air Defense Command (ADC) base, whose host was the 507th Fighter Group (Air Defense) and assigned it to the 40th Air Division as part of SAC's plan to disperse its Boeing B-52 Stratofortress heavy bombers over a larger number of bases, thus making it more difficult for the Soviet Union to knock out the entire fleet with a surprise first strike. The wing remained a headquarters only until 1 June 1961 when the 70th Munitions Maintenance Squadron was activated to oversee the wing's special weapons.

The 93d Bombardment Squadron (BS), consisting of 15 Boeing B-52 Stratofortresses, moved to Kincheloe from Homestead AFB, Florida where it had been one of the three squadrons of the 19th Bombardment Wing in August 1961. At the same time three maintenance squadrons and a squadron to provide security for special weapons were activated and assigned to the wing. Starting in 1960, one third of the squadron's aircraft were maintained on fifteen-minute alert, fully fueled and ready for combat to reduce vulnerability to a Soviet missile strike. This was increased to half the squadron's aircraft in 1962. The 4239th (and later the 449th) continued to maintain an alert commitment until the 449th was inactivated in 1977. In 1962, the wing's bombers began to be equipped with the GAM-77 Hound Dog and the GAM-72 Quail air-launched cruise missiles, The 4239th Airborne Missile Maintenance Squadron was activated in November to maintain these missiles.

However, SAC Strategic Wings could not carry a permanent history or lineage and SAC looked for a way to make its Strategic Wings permanent.

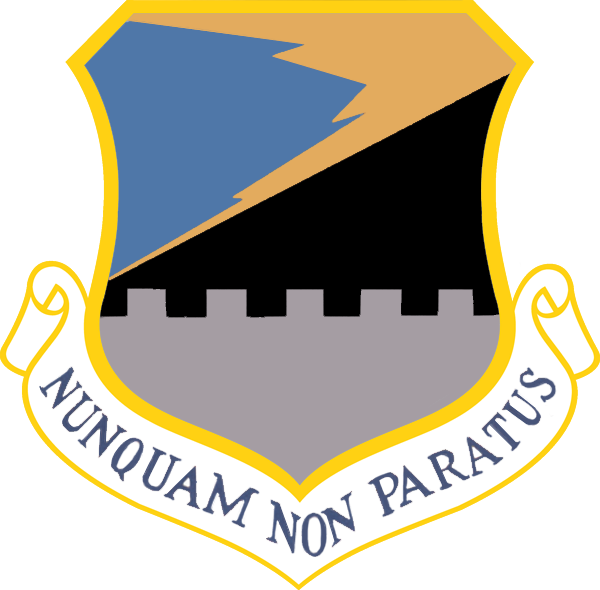
449th Bombardment Wing Emblem

==== 449th Bombardment Wing ====
In 1962, in order to perpetuate the lineage of many currently inactive bombardment units with illustrious World War II records, Headquarters SAC received authority from Headquarters USAF to discontinue its Major Command controlled (MAJCON) strategic wings that were equipped with combat aircraft and to activate Air Force controlled (AFCON) units, most of which were inactive at the time which could carry a lineage and history. As a result, the 4239th SW was replaced by the 449th Bombardment Wing, Heavy which assumed its mission, personnel, and equipment on 1 February 1963.

In the same way the 716th Bombardment Squadron, one of the unit's World War II historical bomb squadrons, replaced the 93d BS. The 70th Munitions Maintenance Squadron was reassigned to the 449th. Under the Dual Deputate organization, all flying and maintenance squadrons were directly assigned to the wing, so no operational group was activated. The 4239th's maintenance and security squadrons were replaced by ones with the 449th numerical designation of the new wing. Each of the new units assumed the personnel, equipment, and mission of its predecessor. In July 1963, the wing added an air refueling capability when the 908th Air Refueling Squadron, equipped with Boeing KC-135 Stratotankers, was organized and assigned to the wing.

The 449th continued the mission of strategic bombardment training and contributing to SAC's worldwide refueling capability. It supported SAC combat operations in Southeast Asia by furnishing KC-135 aircraft and crews from November 1965 through December 1975 and B-52 crews between May 1968 and June 1975.

Although the number of ADC interceptor squadrons remained almost constant in the early 1960s, attrition (and the fact that production lines closed in 1961) caused a gradual drop in the number of planes assigned to fighter interceptor squadrons, from 24 to typically 18 by 1964 and to 12 by 1967. Because of this reduction, in December 1965, the Department of Defense announced it would close Kincheloe by October 1971. ADC terminated its interceptor mission at Kincheloe and inactivated its 507th Fighter Wing in 1968. It then organized the 4609th Air Base Group as a temporary host organization for the base. However, in May 1971, the decision to close the base was reversed and it was instead transferred to SAC, which activated the 449th Combat Support Group as the new host organization and assigned it to the wing. This was only a six-year reprieve, as the base was closed on 30 September 1977 as part of an ongoing reduction in force in the USAF following the end of the Vietnam War. The B-52s and KC-135s of the 449th were reassigned to other SAC units, and the wing was inactivated concurrent with the closure of the base.

=== Europe and Africa ===
From 2008, the 449th Air Expeditionary Group has been assigned to United States Air Forces Europe to activate or inactivate as needed for operations. The group is currently based at Camp Lemonnier, Djibouti. The 449th provides combat search and rescue for the Combined Joint Task Force - Horn of Africa. The group has been assigned various expeditionary rescue squadrons while located in Djibouti. It is composed of HC-130P Hercules aircraft assigned to the 81st Expeditionary Rescue Squadron and pararescuemen from the 82nd Expeditionary Rescue Squadron. While deployed the group performed both combat and civil search and rescue missions. Since the above referenced fact sheet was issued the group has been joined by the 75th Expeditionary Airlift Squadron.

In November 2006, while conducting an air-land mission, Staff Sergeant Joshua C. Sevilla, assigned to the group's 79th Expeditionary Rescue Squadron and his crew were forcibly detained by at El Fasher Airport, Sudan by members of the Sudanese military who accused them of espionage and demanded the surrender of all crew members and the aircraft. SSG Sevilla denied a force of more than 150 Sudanese soldiers the ability to control the aircraft, enabling all 17 American detainees to return.

The 303rd Expeditionary Rescue Squadron, now a provisional Expeditionary Rescue Squadron assigned to USAFE since July 2011, has conducted deployments as part of the 449th AEG as the 303rd ERQS, at least during December 2013.

From November 2016 a detachment of General Dynamics F-16CM Fighting Falcons were deployed here from the 510th Fighter Squadron at Aviano Air Base, Italy with support from the 100th Air Refueling Wing, from RAF Mildenhall, UK using Boeing KC-135 Stratotankers.

It is likely that the 60th Expeditionary Reconnaissance Squadron at Camp Lemonnier was associated with the group in some way until it was inactivated in 2015. The 12th Expeditionary Special Operations Squadron now conducts UAV takeoffs and landings from Chabelley Airport in Djibouti.

== Lineage ==
=== 449th Bombardment Group ===
- Constituted as 449th Bombardment Group (Heavy) on 6 April 1943

Activated on 1 May 1943.
Redesignated 449th Bombardment Group, Heavy ca. August 1943
Redesignated 449th Bombardment Group, Very Heavy on 29 May 1945
Inactivated on 4 August 1946

- Consolidated with 449th Bombardment Wing as 449th Bombardment Wing on 31 January 1984 (remained inactive)

=== 449th Air Expeditionary Group ===
- Constituted as 449th Fighter-Bomber Wing on 23 March 1953

Redesignated 449th Bombardment Wing, Heavy on 15 November 1962 and activated (not organized)
Organized on 1 February 1963
Inactivated on 30 September 1977.

- Consolidated with 449th Bombardment Group on 31 January 1984 (remained inactive)
- Redesignated 449th Air Expeditionary Group and converted to provisional status in 2003.

Activated and inactivated on undetermined dates.

=== Assignments ===
- Fourth Air Force, 1 May 1943
- Second Air Force, 12 September 1943
- 47th Bombardment Wing: 11 December 1943 – 15 May 1945
- 20th Bombardment Wing, 29 May 1945
- Strategic Air Command: 21 March 1946 – 4 August 1946
- Strategic Air Command: 15 November 1962 (not organized)
- 40th Air Division, 1 February 1963 – 30 September 1977
- Air Combat Command to activate or inactivate any time in 2003 (attached to United States Air Forces Central, 2003)
- United States Air Forces in Europe to activate or inactivate any time after 1 October 2008
- Seventeenth Air Force, 1 October 2008 - 20 April 2012
- Third Air Force, 20 April 2012 – present

=== Stations ===
- Davis–Monthan Field, Arizona, 1 May 1943
- Alamogordo Army Air Field, 5 July 1943 (elements trained at Albuquerque Army Air Base New Mexico)
- Bruning Army Air Field, Nebraska, 12 September – 3 December 1943
- Grottaglie Airfield, Italy, c. 4 January 1944 – 16 May 1945
- Sioux Falls Army Air Field, South Dakota, 29 May 1945
- Dalhart Army Airfield, Texas, 24 July 1945
- Grand Island Army Air Field, Nebraska, 8 September 1945 – 4 August 1946.
- Kincheloe AFB, Michigan, 1 February 1963 – 30 September 1977
- Camp Lemonnier, Djibouti (2003–present)

=== Components ===
==== Groups ====
- 449th Combat Support Group, 30 June 1971 – 30 September 1977

==== Operational squadrons ====
1943–1977

- 716th Bombardment Squadron: 1 May 1943 – 4 August 1946, 1 February 1963 – 30 September 1977
- 717th Bombardment Squadron: 1 May 1943 – 4 August 1946
- 718th Bombardment Squadron: 1 May 1943 – 4 August 1946
- 719th Bombardment Squadron (later 46th Reconnaissance Squadron): 1 May 1943 – 11 June 1945
- 908th Air Refueling Squadron: 1 July 1963 – 30 September 1977

From 2011

- 79th Expeditionary Rescue Squadron: unknown dates
- 81st Expeditionary Rescue Squadron: unknown dates
- 82d Expeditionary Rescue Squadron: unknown dates
- 303d Expeditionary Rescue Squadron: unknown dates, but after 22 July 2011

==== Support squadrons ====
- 70th Munitions Maintenance Squadron: 1 July 1963 – 30 September 1972
- 449th Airborne Missile Maintenance Squadron: 1 July 1963 – 30 June 1975
- 449th Armament & Electronics Maintenance Squadron: 1 July 1963 – 30 September 1977
- 449th Combat Defense Squadron (later 449th Security Police Squadron): 1 July 1963 – 30 June 1971
- 449th Field Maintenance Squadron: 1 July 1963 – 30 September 1977
- 449th Munitions Maintenance Squadron: 1 October 1972 – 30 September 1977
- 449th Organizational Maintenance Squadron: 1 July 1963 – 30 September 1977

==== Other ====
- USAF Hospital, Kincheloe: 30 June 1971 – 30 September 1977

=== Aircraft and missiles ===
- Consolidated B-24 Liberator (1943–1945)
- Boeing B-29 Superfortress (1945–1946)
- Boeing B-52 Stratofortress (1963–1977)
- ADM-20 Quail (1963–unknown)
- AGM-28 Hound Dog (1963–1975)
- AGM-69 SRAM (1973–1977)
- Boeing KC-135 Stratotanker (1963–1977)
- Lockheed C-130 Hercules (present)

=== Awards and campaigns ===
Award streamer	Award	Dates	Notes
	Distinguished Unit Citation	4 April 1944	Bucharest, Rumania
	Distinguished Unit Citation	9 July 1944	Ploiești, Romania
	Air Force Outstanding Unit Award	1 July 1974 – 30 June 1976	

Campaign Streamer	Theater	Campaign	Notes
	American Theater of World War II		
	Mediterranean Theater of Operations	Air Combat EAME Theater	
	Mediterranean Theater of Operations	Air Offensive, Europe	
	Mediterranean Theater of Operations	Naples-Foggia	
	Mediterranean Theater of Operations	Anzio	
	Mediterranean Theater of Operations	Rome-Arno	
	Mediterranean Theater of Operations	Normandy	
	Mediterranean Theater of Operations	Northern France	
	Mediterranean Theater of Operations	Southern France	
	Mediterranean Theater of Operations	North Apennines	
	Mediterranean Theater of Operations	Rhineland	
	Mediterranean Theater of Operations	Central Europe	
	Mediterranean Theater of Operations	Po Valley	

== See also ==
- List of B-52 Units of the United States Air Force
