= 40 =

40 or forty commonly refers to:

- 40 (number), the natural number following 39 and preceding 41
- one of the years 40 BC, AD 40, 1940, 2040

40 or forty may also refer to:

== Music ==
- 40 (record producer) (Noah Shebib, born 1983), Canadian hip hop producer
- 40 (Foreigner album), 2017
- 40 (Stray Cats album), 2019
- 40 (Sunnyboys album), 2019
- 40 (Grupo Niche album), 2020
- Forty (album), a 2001 live album by Thomas Dolby
- 40 (video), by the Allman Brothers Band
- "40" (U2 song), 1982
- "40" (Evilgiane, Nettspend and Xaviersobased song), 2024
- 40, an album by Earthshaker
- 40, an album by Peter Morén
- "40'", a song by Franz Ferdinand from Franz Ferdinand, 2004
- "Forty", a song by Karma to Burn from Almost Heathen, 2001

== Other uses ==
- 40 ounce or forty, a bottle of malt liquor
- Forty winks or forty, sleep or nap
- .40 S&W, pistol cartridge
- .40 Super, wildcat pistol cartridge
- (, the ASCII character with code 40
- The international telephone code for Romania
- 40 Harmonia, a main-belt asteroid

== See also ==
- 40th (disambiguation)
- Tessarakonteres (English: Forty), a very large ancient Egyptian galley
- Top 40: a radio format; the current, 40 most-popular songs in the music industry
- This Is 40, a 2012 American film
