= 40th Air Division =

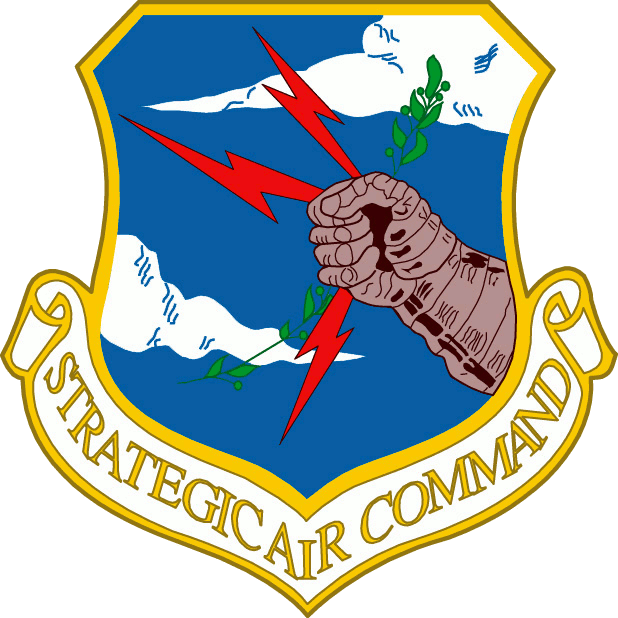
40th Air Division

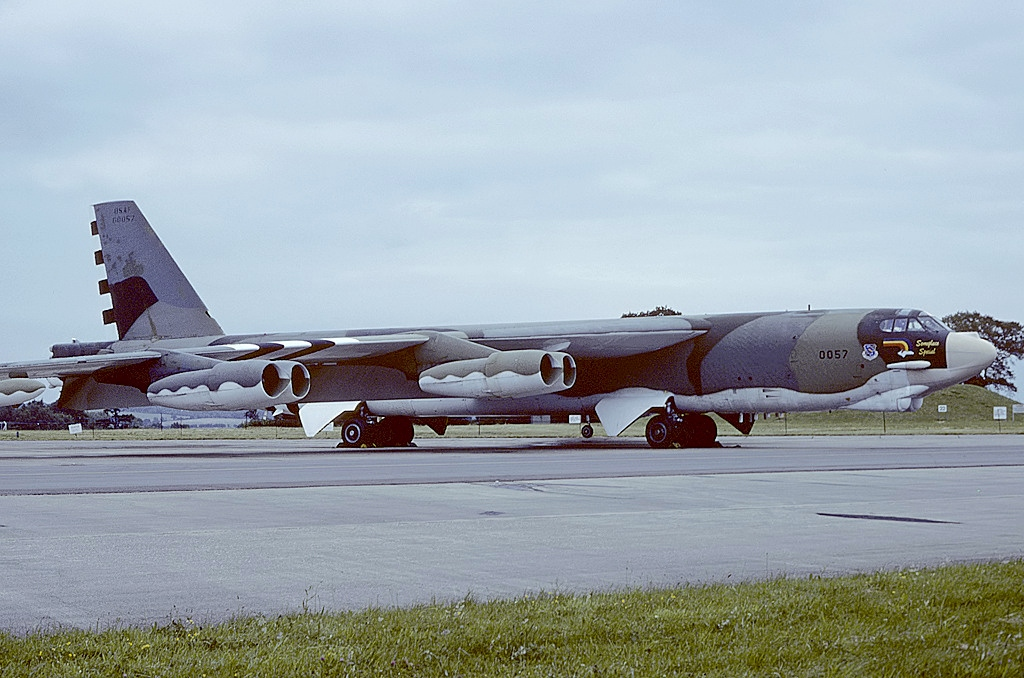
- B-52H Stratofortress of the division's 410th Bombardment Wing
- Active: 1943–1946; 1951–1957; 1959–1988; 1989–1991
- Country: United States
- Branch: United States Air Force
- Role: Command of strategic strike forces
- Decorations: Distinguished Unit Citation

Insignia
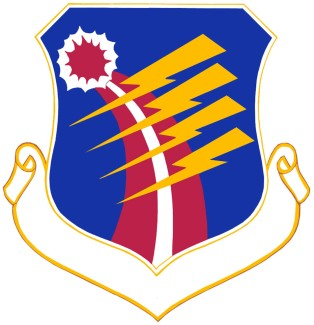
- 40th Air Division emblem (Approved 14 April 1952)

The 40th Air Division is an inactive United States Air Force unit. Its last assignment was with Fifteenth Air Force at Malmstrom Air Force Base, Montana. It was inactivated on 14 June 1991.

As the 40th Bombardment Wing, the unit was one of the primary B-17 Flying Fortress heavy strategic bombardment wings of VIII Bomber Command and later, Eighth Air Force in World War II.

== History ==
The 40th Bomb Wing was established on 15 January 1943 and officially activated on 21 January 1943. In May of that year, the Wing deployed to Brampton Grange, England. During the war, the wing went through a succession of name changes starting on 3 May 1943 when they were redesignated the 40 Bombardment Wing (Heavy). This was quickly followed by another change on 30 August 1943 when they were redesignated the 40 Combat Bombardment Wing (Heavy). In September 1943, the wing received three bombardment groups and began combat operations against Nazi Germany, striking such targets as Nantes, Emden, Wilhelmshaven, and Bremen. Its units participated in a mission to Schweinfurt on 14 October 1943 that resulted in the loss of over half of the aircraft dispatched. The final name change came on 13 August 1943 when they became 40 Combat Bombardment Wing, Heavy. For the remainder of World War II, the wing flew numerous missions against military targets throughout occupied Europe and Germany. Following the end of the war the Wing was inactivated on 25 December 1946.

"Redesignated the 40th Air Division in March 1951, it assumed a supervisory role over assigned units of the Strategic Air Command, ensuring that they were manned, trained, and equipped to conduct long range bombardment missions using either nuclear or conventional weapons. It also developed and maintained the capability for effective air refueling and Minuteman II (intercontinental ballistic missile) operations. In these roles the division conducted staff assistance visits and participated in numerous exercises such as Buy None, Buckskin Rider and Busy Player."

"After July 1989, the 40th Air Division established policies to ensure support for wartime execution of a strategic ICBM wing and a strategic air refueling wing in accordance with the Single Integrated Operational Plan and Joint Chiefs of Staff directed conventional war-fighting commitments."

== Lineage ==
- Established as the 40th Bombardment Wing on 15 January 1943

Activated on 21 January 1943
Redesignated: 40th Bombardment Wing (Heavy) on 3 May 1943
Redesignated: 40th Combat Bombardment Wing (Heavy) on 30 August 1943
Redesignated: 40th Combat Bombardment Wing, Heavy on 13 August 1944
Redesignated: 40th Bombardment Wing, Heavy on 9 June 1945
Inactivated on 25 December 1946

- Redesignated 40th Air Division on 2 March 1951

Organized on 14 March 1951
Discontinued on 1 July 1952

- Activated on 1 July 1952

Inactivated on 1 April 1957

- Activated on 1 July 1959

Inactivated on 8 June 1988

- Activated on 7 July 1989

Inactivated on 14 June 1991

=== Assignments ===
- Third Air Force, 21 January 1943
- Eighth Air Force, 6 June 1943
- VIII Bomber Command, 8 June 1943
- 1st Bombardment Division (later 1 Air Division), 13 September 1943
- United States Air Forces in Europe, c. 31 October 1945
- European Air Materiel Command, 20 – 25 December 1946
- Second Air Force, 14 March 1951 – 1 April 1957
- Second Air Force, 1 July 1959
- Eighth Air Force, 1 January 1975 – 8 June 1988
- Fifteenth Air Force, 7 July 1989 – 14 June 1991

=== Components ===
Wings

- 17th Bombardment Wing: 1 February – 1 July 1963; 1 July 1971 – 1 July 1973
- 31st Fighter-Escort Wing (later 31st Strategic Fighter Wing): 14 March 1951 – 1 July 1952; 1 July 1952 – 1 April 1957 (detached 10 July – 11 October 1952 and 10 November 1953 – 12 February 1954)
- 108th Fighter Wing: 14 March – 16 November 1951
- 146th Fighter Wing: 17 April – c. 1 September 1951
- 301st Air Refueling Wing: 2 July 1966 – 31 March 1970; 1 July 1973 – 1 July 1975; 7 July 1989 – 14 June 1991
- 305th Air Refueling Wing: 1 July 1973 – 1 December 1982
- 341st Strategic Missile Wing: 7 July 1989 – 14 June 1991
- 351st Strategic Missile Wing: 1 July 1973 – 1 December 1982
- 379th Bombardment Wing: 9 January 1961 – 8 June 1988
- 410th Bombardment Wing: 1 February 1963 – 1 September 1964; 31 March 1970 – 8 January 1988
- 416th Bombardment Wing: 30 June 1971 – 1 July 1973; 1 December 1982 – 8 June 1988
- 449th Bombardment Wing: 1 February 1963 – 30 September 1977
- 499th Air Refueling Wing: 1 February 1963 – 30 September 1977
- 500th Air Refueling Wing: 1 July 1963 – 15 December 1964
- 508th Fighter-Escort Wing (later 508 Strategic Fighter Wing): 1 July 1952 – 11 May 1956 (detached c. 8 February -c. 13 May 1953 and 12 February-c. 7 May 1954)
- 4026th Strategic Wing: 1 July 1959 – 9 January 1961
- 4042d Strategic Wing: 1 July 1959 – 1 February 1963
- 4043d Strategic Wing: 1 July 1959 – 1 February 1963
- 4080th Strategic Reconnaissance Wing: 1 May 1956 – 1 April 1957
- 4239th Strategic Wing: 1 July 1959 – 1 February 1963

Groups

- 2d Bombardment Group, 15 December 1945 – 28 February 1946
- 92d Bombardment Group, 13 September 1943 – 28 February 1946
- 305th Bombardment Group, 13 September 1943 – 16 May 1945; 31 December 1945 – 25 December 1946
- 306th Bombardment Group, 13 September 1943 – 16 May 1945; 16 December 1945 – 25 December 1946
- 384th Bombardment Group, 31 May 1945 – 28 February 1946
- 492d Bombardment Group, by 31 October 1944-c. May 1945

Squadron

- 100th Air Refueling Squadron: 20 January – 23 May 1953; 24 – 25 November 1953

=== Stations ===
- MacDill Field, Florida, 21 January–May 1943
- Brampton Grange (AAF-103), England, 6 June 1943
- RAF Thurleigh (AAF-111), England, c. 16 September 1943
- Istres-Le Tubé Airfield (Y-17), France, 26 June 1945
- AAF Station Erlangen, Germany, 15 November 1945 – 25 December 1946
- Turner Air Force Base, Georgia, 14 March 1951 – 1 July 1952; 1 July 1952 – 1 April 1957
- Wurtsmith Air Force Base, Michigan, 1 July 1959 – 8 June 1988
- Malmstrom Air Force Base, Montana, 7 July 1989 – 14 June 1991

=== Aircraft and Missiles ===
- Boeing B-17 Flying Fortress, 1943–1946
- Consolidated B-24 Liberator, 1944–1945
- Douglas C-47 Skytrain, 1944–1945
- Douglas A-26 Invader, 1945
- North American P-51 Mustang, 1945
- de Havilland Mosquito, 1945
- Republic F-84 Thunderjet, 1951–1957
- Boeing KB-29 Superfortress, 1953–1956
- Martin B-57 Canberra, 1956–1957
- Boeing B-52 Stratofortress, 1961–1988
- KC-135 Stratotanker, 1961–1988, 1989–1991
- Boeing KC-97 Stratofreighter, 1963–1964
- Minuteman-II (LGM-30F), 1973–1988, 1989–1991
- Minuteman-III (LGM-30G), 1989–1991

== See also ==
- List of United States Air Force air divisions
