= 40th Division (Yugoslav Partisans) =

Yugoslav Partisan military division formed in 1944

40th Slavonia Division
- Flag of Democratic Federal Yugoslavia (used by the Partisans)
- Active: 1944–1945
- Country: Democratic Federal Yugoslavia
- Allegiance: Yugoslav Partisans
- Branch: Yugoslav Partisan Army
- Type: Infantry
- Size: ~4,700 (24 August 1944)
- Engagements: World War II in Yugoslavia

Commanders
- Notable commanders: Veljko Kovačević(July 1944 - December 1944); Savo Miljanović (December 1944 - May 1945)

The 40th Slavonia Division (Serbo-Croatian Latin: Četrdeseta slavonska divizija) was a Yugoslav Partisan division formed on 15 July 1944. It was formed from the 16th Youth Brigade and 18th Slavonia Brigade. The division was part of the 6th Corps and it mostly fought in Slavonia region. Commander of the division until December 1944 was Veljko Kovačević, after him Savo Miljanović served as the commander.
