= 716th Bombardment Squadron =

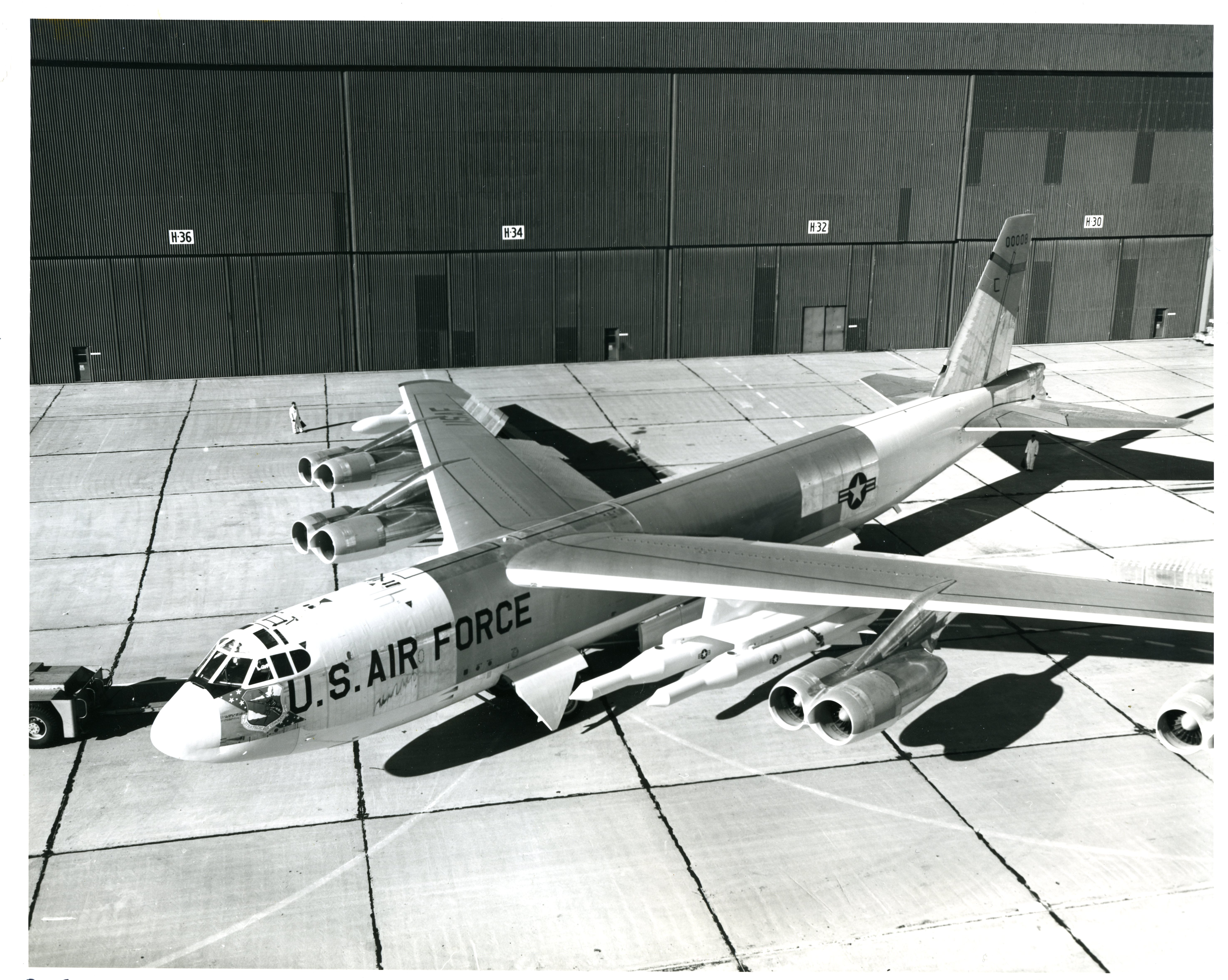
- B-52H Stratofortress as flown by the 716th
- Active: 1943–1946; 1963–1977
- Country: United States
- Branch: United States Air Force
- Role: Heavy bomber
- Engagements: Mediterranean Theater of Operations
- Decorations: Distinguished Unit Citation; Air Force Outstanding Unit Award

Insignia
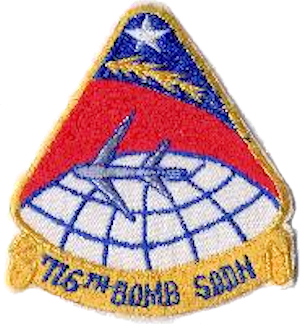
- Patch with 716th Bombardment Squadron emblem (Strategic Air Command)

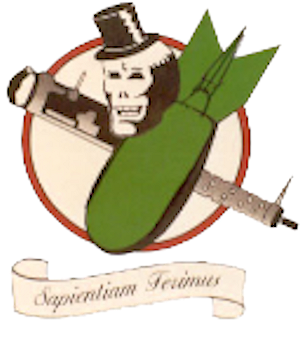
- 716th Bombardment Squadron emblem (World War II)

The 716th Bombardment Squadron is an inactive United States Air Force unit. It was last assigned to the 449th Bombardment Wing at Kincheloe Air Force Base, Michigan, where it was inactivated on 30 September 1977.

The squadron was first activated in May 1943. After training in the United States, the squadron deployed to the Mediterranean Theater of Operations, where it participated in the strategic bombing campaign against Germany. The squadron was awarded two Distinguished Unit Citations for its actions during the war. Following V-E Day, the 716th returned to the United States and trained with Boeing B-29 Superfortresses, becoming one of the first bomber units in Strategic Air Command (SAC) before inactivating in August 1946.

The squadron was reactivated by SAC at Kincheloe in 1963 and served with Boeing B-52 Stratofortress aircraft until inactivating.

== History ==
=== World War II ===
The squadron was first activated in May 1943 at Davis-Monthan Field, Arizona as one of the four original squadrons of the 449th Bombardment Group. It trained with Consolidated B-24 Liberators at Alamogordo Army Air Field, New Mexico and Bruning Army Air Field, Nebraska before departing for the Mediterranean Theater of Operations in November 1943.

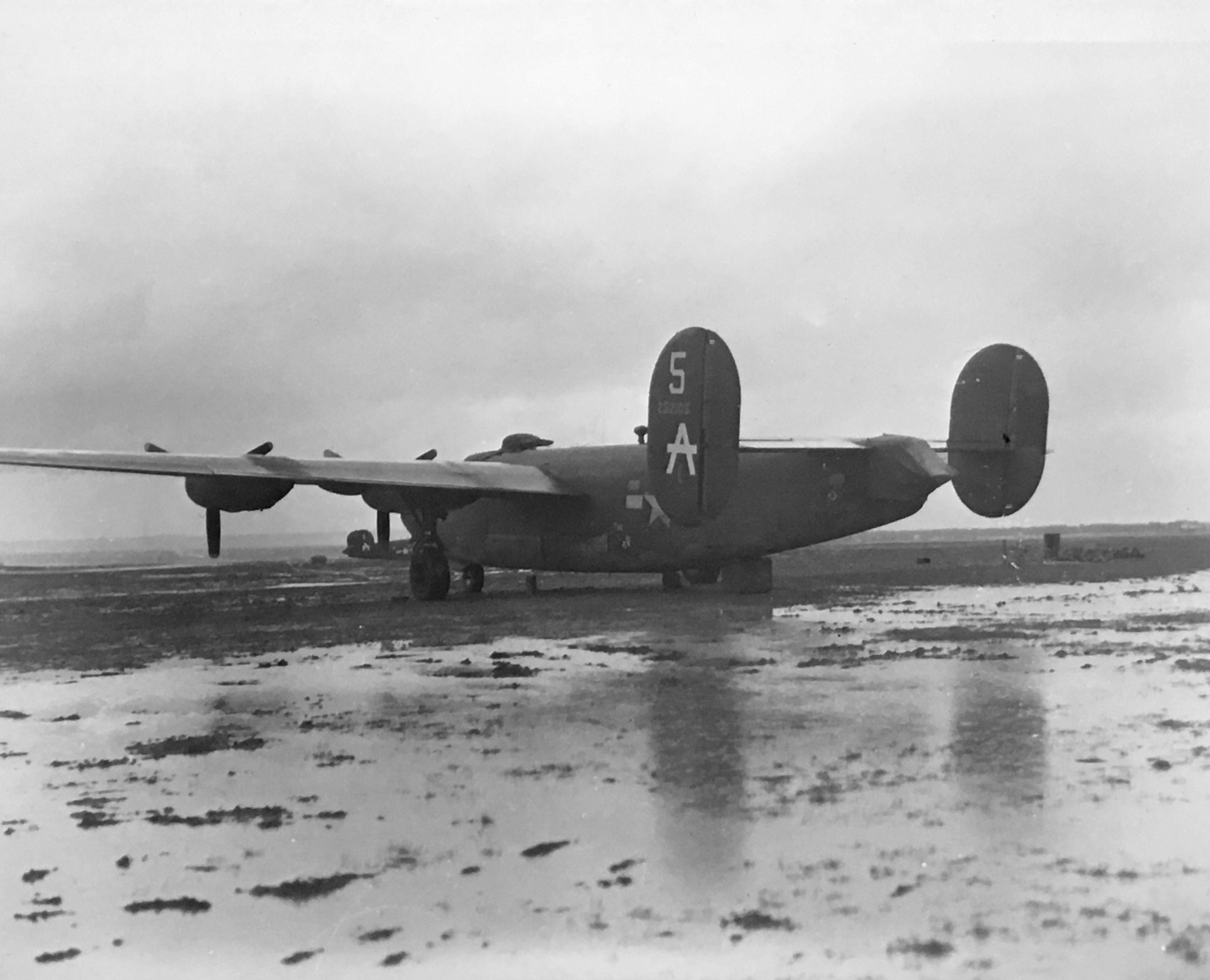
449th Group B-24 in Italy

The squadron assembled at its combat station, Grottaglie Airfield in Southern Italy, in early January 1944, from which it mainly undertook strategic bombing missions. It attacked oil refineries, communications centers, aircraft factories and industrial facilities in Italy, Germany, Czechoslovakia, Hungary, Romania, Albania and Greece. It was awarded a Distinguished Unit Citation (DUC) for its actions on 4 April 1944, when the squadron, along with the other elements of the 449th Group, operated without fighter escort in an attack on railroad marshalling yards near Bucharest. The attacking group was heavily outnumbered by German interceptor aircraft. Despite this, it succeeded in destroying its assigned target and also inflicted heavy losses on the defending fighters. It was awarded a second DUC for an attack against oil refineries near Ploesti, attacking through heavy smoke that obscured the target area and despite intense enemy fire.

The squadron attacked gun emplacements to support Operation Dragoon, the invasion of southern France in August 1944. It attacked troop concentrations, bridges and viaducts during Operation Grapeshot, the Fifteenth Army Group offensive in Northern Italy in the spring of 1945. Shortly after V-E Day, in May 1945, the squadron returned to the United States.

The squadron reformed at Sioux Falls Army Air Field, South Dakota at the end of May. The squadron then began training with Boeing B-29 Superfortress very heavy bombers. After V-J Day and the end of the War in the Pacific, the squadron moved to Grand Island Army Air Field, Nebraska, where it became one of the first bomber units of Strategic Air Command (SAC) in March 1946. In August 1946, the 28th Bombardment Group replaced the 449th Group at Grand Island, and the squadron was inactivated and its personnel and equipment were transferred to the 77th Bombardment Squadron on 4 August 1946.

=== Cold War ===
In February 1963, The 449th Bombardment Wing was organized at Kincheloe Air Force Base, Michigan, where it assumed the aircraft, personnel and equipment of the discontinued 4239th Strategic Wing. The 4239th was a Major Command controlled (MAJCON) wing, which could not carry a permanent history or lineage, and SAC wanted to replace it with a permanent unit. As part of this reorganization, the 716th Squadron was activated and assumed the mission, personnel and equipment of the 93d Bombardment Squadron, which was simultaneously inactivated.

One half of the squadron's Boeing B-52H Stratofortresses were maintained on fifteen minute alert, fully fueled and ready for combat to reduce vulnerability to a Soviet missile strike. In addition, the squadron trained for strategic bombardment missions. From May 1968 through June 1975, the squadron provided aircrews to support SAC operations in Southeast Asia. In July 1977, the squadron began to draw down in anticipation of the closing of Kinchloe, and it was inactivated when the base closed in September 1977.

== Lineage ==
- Constituted as the 716th Bombardment Squadron (Heavy) on 6 April 1943

Activated on 1 May 1943
Redesignated 716th Bombardment Squadron, Heavy c. 1944
Redesignated 716th Bombardment Squadron, Very Heavy on 23 May 1945
Inactivated on 4 August 1946

- Redesignated 716th Bombardment Squadron, Heavy and activated, on 15 November 1962 (not organized)

Organized on 1 February 1963
Inactivated on 30 September 1977

=== Assignments ===
- 449th Bombardment Group, 1 May 1943 – 4 August 1946
- Strategic Air Command, 15 November 1962 (not organized)
- 449th Bombardment Wing, 1 February 1963 – 30 September 1977

=== Stations ===
- Davis-Monthan Field, Arizona, 1 May 1943
- Alamogordo Army Air Field, New Mexico, 5 July 1943
- Bruning Army Air Field, Nebraska, 12 September-26 November 1943
- Grottaglie Airfield, Italy, c. 6 January 1944 – 15 May 1945
- Sioux Falls Army Air Field, South Dakota, 29 May 1945
- Dalhart Army Air Field, Texas, 24 July 1945
- Grand Island Army Air Field, Nebraska, 8 September 1945 – 4 August 1946
- Kincheloe Air Force Base, Michigan, 1 February 1963 – 30 September 1977

=== Aircraft ===
- Consolidated B-24 Liberator, 1943–1945
- Boeing B-17 Flying Fortress, 1945
- Boeing B-29 Superfortress, 1946
- Boeing B-52H Stratofortress, 1963–1977

=== Awards and campaigns ===
Award streamer	Award	Dates	Notes
	Distinguished Unit Citation	4 April 1944	Bucharest, Rumania
	Distinguished Unit Citation	9 July 1944	Ploesti, Rumania
	Air Force Outstanding Unit Award	1 July 1974-30 June 1976	
	Air Force Outstanding Unit Award	1 July 1976-30 June 1977	

Campaign Streamer	Campaign	Dates	Notes
	American Theater without inscription	1 May 1943 – 26 November 1943	
	Air Offensive, Europe	c. 6 January 1944 – 5 June 1944	
	Naples-Foggia	c. 6 January 1944 – 21 January 1944	
	Air Combat, EAME Theater	c. 6 January 1944 – 11 May 1945	
	Anzio	22 January 1944 – 24 May 1944	
	Rome-Arno	22 January 1944 – 9 September 1944	
	Central Europe	22 March 1944 – 21 May 1945	
	Normandy	6 June 1944 – 24 July 1944	
	Northern France	25 July 1944 – 14 September 1944	
	Southern France	15 August 1944 – 14 September 1944	
	North Apennines	10 September 1944 – 4 April 1945	
	Rhineland	15 September 1944 – 21 March 1945	
	Po Valley	3 April 1945 – 8 May 1945	

== See also ==
- B-24 Liberator units of the United States Army Air Forces
- List of B-29 Superfortress operators
- List of B-52 Units of the United States Air Force
