= 93rd Bomb Squadron =

US Air Force Reserve unit

93rd Bomb Squadron

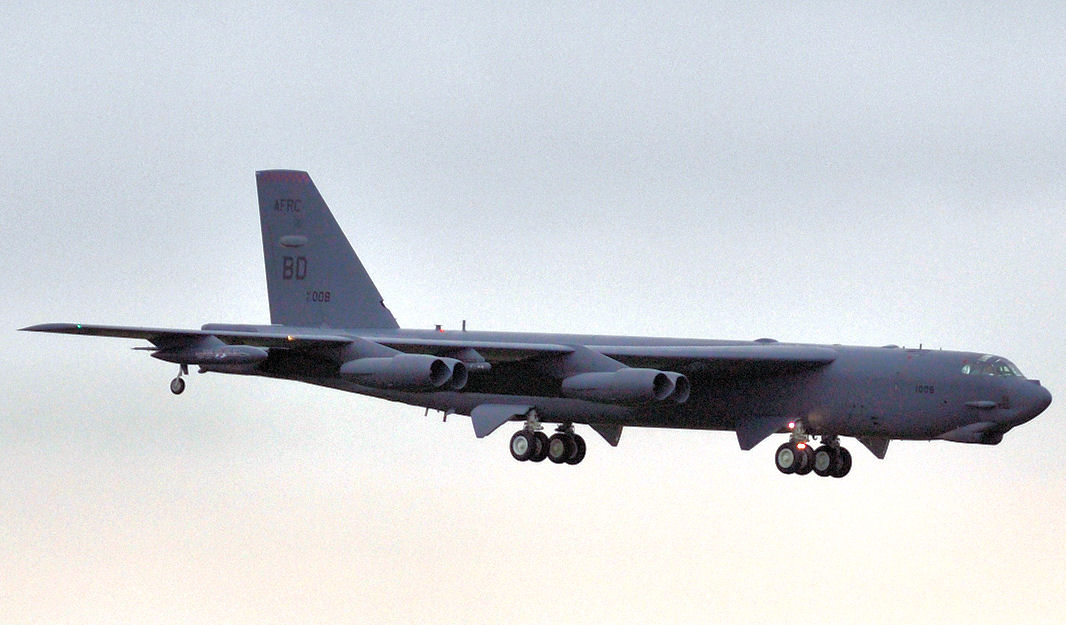
- 93rd Bomb Squadron B-52H Stratofortress (Note: Aircraft is Boeing B-52H-135-BW Stratofortress serial 61-0008.)
- Active: 1917–1919; 1935–1936; 1939–1944; 1944–1963; 1993–present
- Country: United States
- Branch: United States Air Force
- Type: Squadron
- Role: Bombardment
- Part of: Air Force Reserve Command
- Garrison/HQ: Barksdale Air Force Base, Louisiana
- Nickname: Indian Outlaws
- Engagements: World War I; World War II – Asia-Pacific Theater; Korean War; War in Afghanistan; Iraq War

- Decorations: Presidential Unit Citation (9x); Air Force Outstanding Unit Award (2x); Philippine Presidential Unit Citation; Republic of Korea Presidential Unit Citation

Insignia
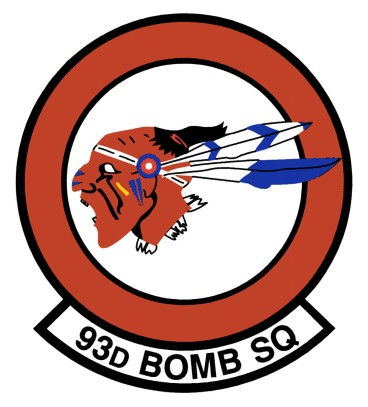
- 93rd Bomb Squadron emblem

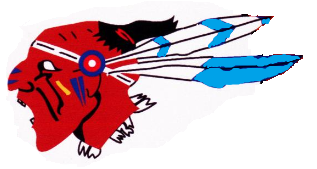
- 93rd Bombardment Squadron emblem (Note: Approved 24 April 1942.)

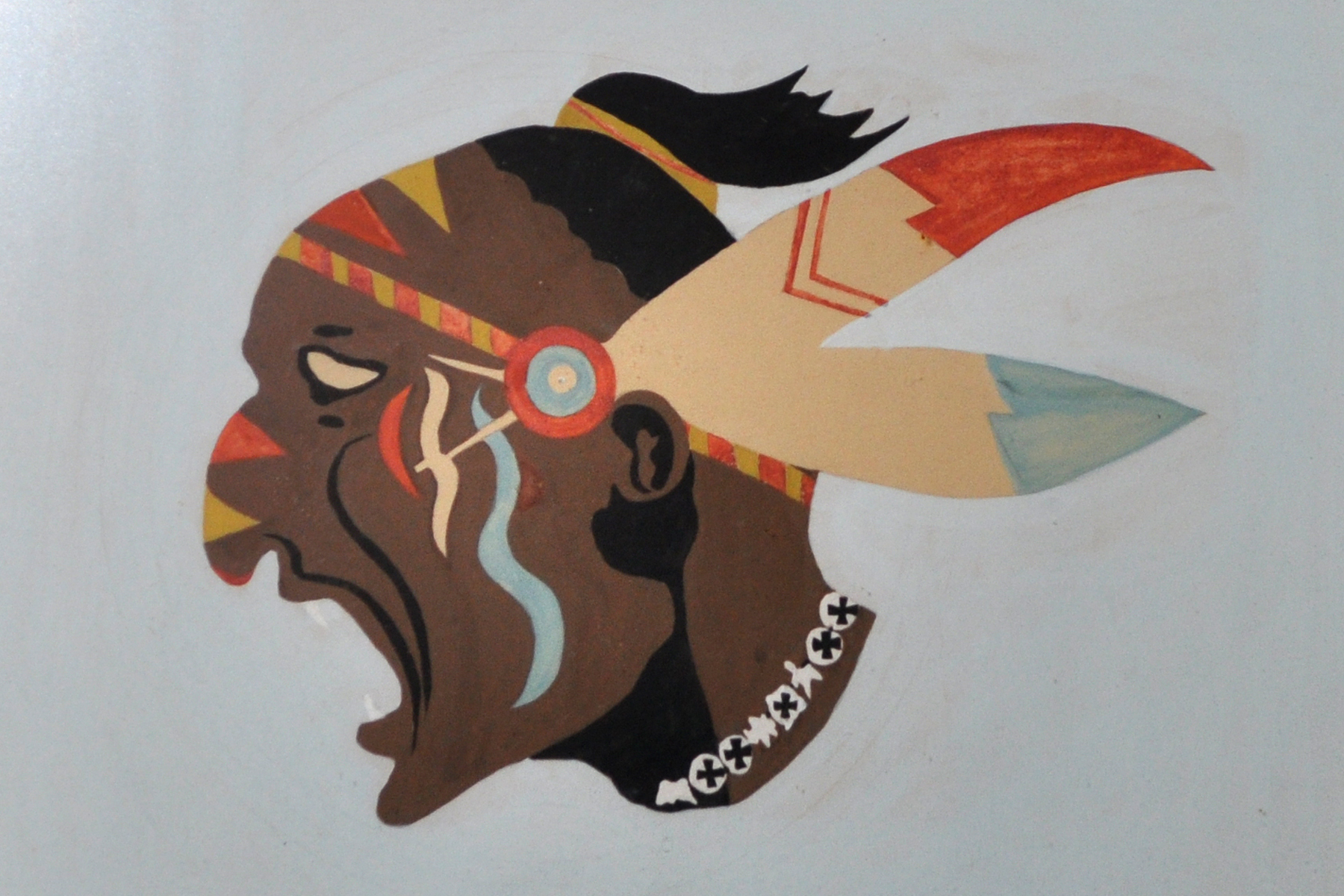
- 93rd Aero Squadron fuselage marking (Note: Approved by AEF 18 November 1918.)
- Tail Code: BD

The 93rd Bomb Squadron, sometimes written as 93d Bomb Squadron, is a squadron of the United States Air Force Reserve. It is assigned to the 307th Operations Group of Air Force Reserve Command, stationed at Barksdale Air Force Base, Louisiana. The squadron is equipped with the Boeing B-52H Stratofortress, and is the Air Force's B-52 Formal Training Unit (F.T.U.).

It is one of two reserve bomber squadrons in the United States Air Force. The 93rd is one of the oldest and most decorated units in the United States Air Force. Its lineage goes back to 1917, and it has been awarded the Presidential Unit Citation- the highest award an American military unit can receive- a total of nine times, along with receiving the presidential citations of the Philippines and South Korea.

== History ==
=== World War I ===
Established as the 93d Aero Squadron in the Air Service during the summer of 1917 in Texas during World War I. Its first predecessor was organized as the 93rd Aero Squadron on 21 August 1917 at Kelly Field, Texas. The squadron deployed to France in October 1917 and trained for aerial combat with the French Air Force. The 93d fought on the Western Front during World War I as a pursuit squadron from 11 August until 10 November 1918. The unit was demobilized after the war in March 1919. The squadron's second predecessor was constituted as the 93rd Attack Squadron in 1929 as part of the United States Army Air Corps.

The squadron was reactivated in 1939 as part of the General Headquarters Air Force as the 93d Bombardment Squadron and assigned to the 19th Bombardment Group at March Field, California. Initially equipped with Martin B-10s, later Douglas B-18 Bolos, receiving early model Boeing B-17C Flying Fortresses before the end of the year.

=== B-17 Service in the Philippines and Australia ===
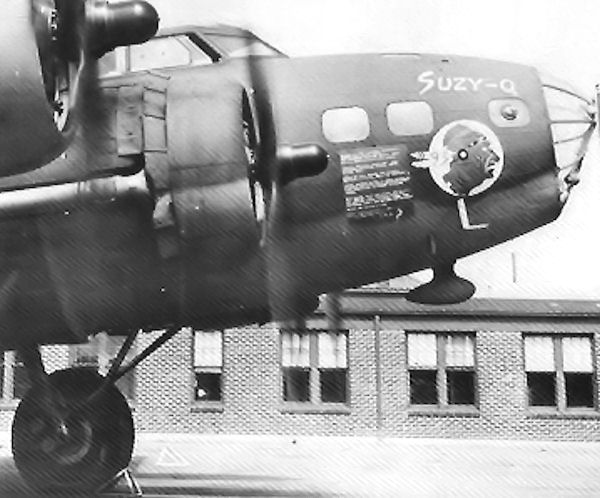
93d Squadron B-17E, Suzy-Q (Note: This aircraft was a Boeing B-17E Flying Fortress, serial 41-2489. "Suzy-Q" was one of the most famous Flying Fortresses of the Pacific War. It was assigned to the squadron on 7 February 1942 and took part in all of the early Pacific battles except Midway. Its gunners claimed no fewer than 26 Japanese aircraft destroyed. It was named after the wife of the pilot, Major Felix Hardison, squadron commander. Deployed to the Pacific, the aircraft operated from airfields in Australia and New Guinea before being returned to the United States in July 1944 and was operated from Hamilton Field, California until the end of the war. It was scrapped sometime after July 1946.)

The squadron deployed to the Philippines as the 93rd Bombardment Squadron in 1941, engaging in combat during the 1941–42 Battle of the Philippines at the beginning of World War II. Withdrawn to Australia, it fought in the Dutch East Indies campaign before returning to the United States and being re-equipped with Boeing B-29 Superfortress bombers. It returned to the Pacific Theater of Operations in early 1945 to carry out strategic bombing missions over the Japanese Home Islands.

The 93rd deployed with part of the 19th Group to the Philippines Air Force at Clark Field, Philippines in October 1941 as a reinforcement unit for the Far East Air Force when tensions were escalating between the United States and the Japanese Empire. On 6 December the 93d was sent to Del Monte Field, a new field established on Mindanao as a dispersal measure.

On 8 December 1941 nearly half of the 19th Group's bombers were destroyed on the ground during an air raid at Clark. The survivors at Del Monte engaged in combat from secondary airfields against the invading Japanese forces until the situation in the Philippines became untenable and they were withdrawn to Australia. The survivors of the ground echelon fought as infantry during Battle of Bataan and after their surrender, were subjected to the Bataan Death March, although some did escape to Australia and some presumably fought on as unorganized guerrilla forces during the Japanese occupation.

In Australia, the escaped airmen and aircraft of the squadron reformed into a combat unit; engaging in combat during the Dutch East Indies and New Guinea Campaigns flying heavy bomber combat missions from Australia.

In late 1942, the B-17C/D and a few F models in Australia were replaced by long-range Consolidated B-24 Liberators, and the unit was returned to the United States and became an operational training unit with Second Air Force for replacement B-17 personnel.

==== Harl Pease Medal of Honor ====
On 7 August 1942, Captain Harl Pease led an all-volunteer crew from the 93d in a B-17 with a makeshift, hand-pumped fuel system on a mission over Rabaul, New Britain. While the crew was successful in bombing their target, Pease and his crew were shot down, captured and beheaded by Japanese forces. Pease posthumously received the Medal of Honor for his bravery, and Pease Air Force Base (now Pease Air National Guard Base) in Portsmouth, New Hampshire was named in his honor in 1957.

=== B-29 Superfortress operations against Japan ===
It was redesignated on 1 April 1944 as a Boeing B-29 Superfortress very heavy bombardment squadron. When training was completed moved to North Field (Guam) in the Mariana Islands of the Central Pacific Area in January 1945 and assigned to XXI Bomber Command, Twentieth Air Force. Its mission was the strategic bombardment of the Japanese Home Islands and the destruction of its war-making capability.

Its groups flew "shakedown" missions against Japanese targets on Moen Island, Truk, and other points in the Caroline Islands and Marianas. The squadron began combat missions over Japan on 25 February 1945 with a firebombing mission over Northeast Tokyo. The squadron continued to participate in wide area firebombing attack, but the first ten-day blitz resulting in the Army Air Forces running out of incendiary bombs. Until then the squadron flew conventional strategic bombing missions using high explosive bombs.

The squadron continued attacking urban areas until the end of the war in August 1945, its subordinate units conducted raids against strategic objectives, bombing aircraft factories, chemical plants, oil refineries, and other targets in Japan. The squadron flew its last combat missions on 14 August when hostilities ended. Afterwards, its B-29s carried relief supplies to Allied prisoner of war camps in Japan and Manchuria.

it remained on Guam after the war conducted sea-search, photographic mapping, and training missions in the western Pacific.

=== Korean War ===
Deployed to Kadena Air Base, Okinawa in June 1950 as a result of the Korean War. Flew strategic bombing missions over North Korea; targets included an oil refinery and port facilities at Wonsan, a railroad bridge at Pyongyang, and Yonpo Airfield. After United Nations ground forces pushed the communists out of South Korea, the squadron turned to strategic objectives in North Korea, including industrial and hydroelectric facilities. It also continued to attack bridges, marshalling yards, supply centers, artillery and troop positions, barracks, port facilities, and airfields.

During the Cold War it carried out B-29 bombardment missions over North Korea during the Korean War, later being a Boeing B-47 Stratojet and Boeing B-52 Stratofortress squadron as part of Strategic Air Command.

Continued bombardment operations until the June 1953 armistice in Korea; returned to the United States in May 1954; the squadrons B-29s being sent to reclamation.

=== Strategic Air Command ===
Re-equipped with Boeing B-47 Stratojets in 1954 as part of Strategic Air Command (SAC). Flew strategic bombardment training missions until 1962 when B-47s were being phased out of the inventory. In 1960 was reassigned to SAC 4239th Strategic Wing, being re-equipped with Boeing B-52H Stratofortress intercontinental heavy bombers. The squadron moved to Kincheloe Air Force Base, Michigan to disperse its heavy bomber force. Conducted worldwide strategic bombardment training missions and providing nuclear deterrent. Was inactivated in 1963 when SAC inactivated its provisional Strategic Wings, redesignating them permanent Air Force Wings. Squadron was inactivated with aircraft, personnel and equipment being transferred to the 716th Bombardment Squadron, which was simultaneously activated.

=== Air Force reserve ===
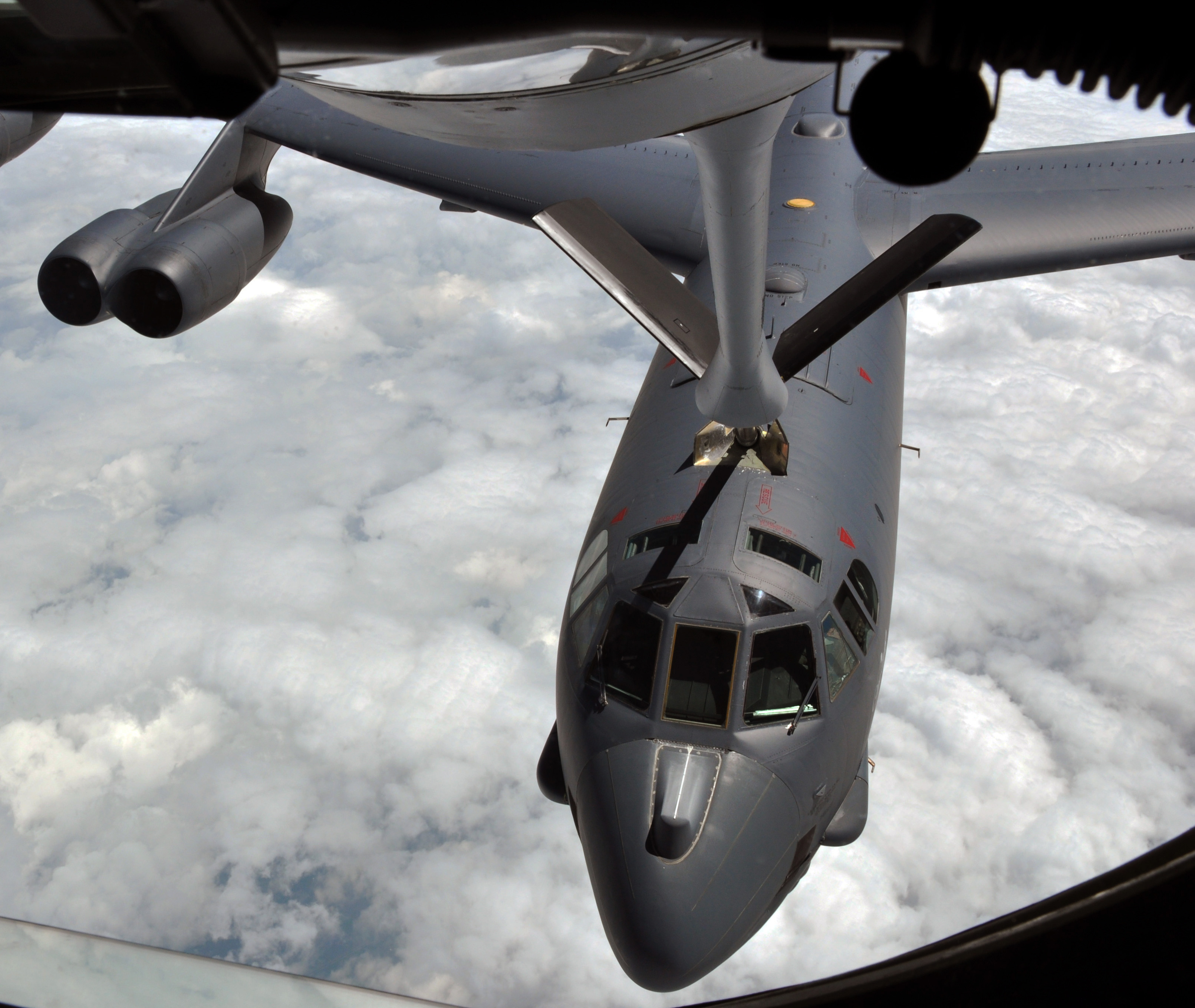
B-52H being refueled from a KC-135 Stratotanker tanker

Reactivated in the Air Force Reserve in 1993, conducting bombardment training. It won the B-52 category of the 1995 Gunsmoke competition and participated in training exercises through the 1990s.

In September 2001 deployed in support of Operation Enduring Freedom where it flew 88 combat missions before redeploying to Barksdale Air Force Base in January 2002. It deployed in support of operations in Afghanistan again from May–September 2002. In March 2003 the 93d deployed to RAF Fairford and Diego Garcia in support of Operation Iraqi Freedom. Between March and August 2003 the 93d flew more than 100 combat sorties and dropped over 1 million pounds of munitions. From January–March 2005 the squadron deployed to Anderson Air Force Base, Guam as part of an ongoing bomber rotation to demonstrate the U.S. commitment to the Asian-Pacific region by the U.S. Pacific Command.

On 3 March 2017, Lt. Col. Steven R. Smith became the first WSO to reach 10,000 hours on the B-52. As a flight instructor with the 93rd Bomb Squadron, Lt. Col. Smith had 496 combat hours and over 30 Years on B-52.

=== B-52 Formal Training Unit ===
In March 2009 the unit assigned the responsibility of being Air Force's Formal Training Unit and will train and prepare Air Combat Command and AFRC B-52 aircrews for worldwide missions. The squadron's aircraft complement grew from eight to 16, with the new assets transferring over from Barksdale's active duty 2nd Bomb Wing. The 2nd BW's 11th BS, the current B-52 FTU, became an active associate to the 93rd BS. The squadron will provide aircraft and produce sorties for the 340th Weapons School and the 49th Test and Evaluation Squadron, a B-52 test organization, at Barksdale AFB.

Although the 93rd BS will no longer be an operational squadron once the FTU stands up, a small classic association comprised four crews will maintain combat proficiency with the 2nd BW.

== Lineage ==
93d Aero Squadron

- Organized as the 93d Aero Squadron on 21 August 1917

Redesignated 93d Aero Squadron (Pursuit) on 26 July 1918
Demobilized on 31 March 1919
Reconstituted and consolidated with the 93d Bombardment Squadron as the 93d Bombardment Squadron on 14 October 1936

93d Bomb Squadron

- Constituted as the 93d Attack Squadron on 8 May 1929

Redesignated 93d Bombardment Squadron on 1 March 1935 (Note: Haulman gives this as the constitution date.)
Organized as a Regular Army Inactive unit on 23 August 1935 (Note: The vast majority of Regular Army Inactive units were organized with only Organized Reserve personnel assigned, while remaining on the inactive list as regular units. Clay, p. vii.)
Consolidated with the 93d Aero Squadron on 14 October 1936
Inactivated on 31 October 1936

- Activated on 20 October 1939

Redesignated 93d Bombardment Squadron (Heavy) on 6 December 1939
Redesignated 93d Bombardment Squadron, Very Heavy on 28 March 1944
Inactivated on 1 April 1944

- Activated on 1 April 1944

Redesignated 93d Bombardment Squadron, Medium on 10 August 1948
Redesignated 93d Bombardment Squadron, Heavy on 1 July 1961
Discontinued and inactivated on 1 April 1963

- Redesignated 93d Bomb Squadron and activated in the reserve on 1 October 1993

=== Assignments ===
- Post Headquarters, Kelly Field, 21 August 1917
- Aviation Concentration Center, 13 October 1917
- Air Service Headquarters, AEF, British Isles (attached to the Royal Flying Corps for training, 30 October 1917 – 1 June 1918)
- Air Service Production Center No. 2, 14 June 1918
- Third Aviation Instruction Center, 7 July 1918
- 3d Pursuit Group, 26 July 1918
- 1st Air Depot, 15 December 1918
- Air Service Production Center No. 2, 1 February 1919 (Note: Haulman says the assignment to the 1st Air Depot lasted until 4 March.)
- Advanced Section Services of Supply, 4 March 1919
- Eastern Department, 13–31 March 1919
- 33d Attack Group, 8 May 1929
- 19th Bombardment Group, 20 October 1939 – 1 April 1944 (Note: Clay indicates this assignment began on 1 March 1935, while the squadron was a Regular Army Inactive unit.) (ground echelon attached to 5th Interceptor Command, c. 19 December 1941 – May 1942)
- 19th Bombardment Group, 1 April 1944
- 19th Bombardment Wing, 1 June 1953
- 4239th Strategic Wing, 1 August 1961 – 1 February 1963
- 917th Operations Group, 1 October 1993 – 8 January 2011
- 307th Operations Group, 8 January 2011 – present

=== Stations ===
- Kelly Field, Texas, 21 August – 29 September 1917
- Garden City, New York, 13 October 1917
- Liverpool, England, 29 October 1917
- Camp Sorden, England (dispersed to several Royal Flying Corps stations in England
- RAF Beaulieu, England, January–24 June 1918
- Flower Down Rest Camp, Winchester, England, 1 June 1918
- Le Havre, France, 7 June 1918
- Romorantin Aerodrome, 14 June 1918
- Issoudun Aerodrome, 7 July 1918
- Vaucouleurs Aerodrome, 28 July 1918
- Lisle-en-Barrois Aerodrome, France, 24 September 1918
- Foucaucourt Aerodrome, France, 6 November 1918
- Colombey-les-Belles Airdrome, France, c. 15 December 1918
- Romorantin Aerodrome, France, 2 February 1919
- Brest, France, 4 March 1919
- Garden City, New York, 13–31 March 1919
- March Field, California, 20 October 1939
- Fort Crockett, Texas, 23 August 1935 – 31 October 1936
- Albuquerque Army Air Base, New Mexico, June–27 September 1941
- Clark Field, Luzon, Philippines, c. 23 October 1941
- Batchelor Airfield, Northern Territory, Australia, c. 19 December 1941 (ground Echelon on Luzon and Mindanao until May 1942)
- Singosari Airfield, Java, Netherlands East Indies, c. 1 January 1942
- Melbourne, Australia, c. 1 March 1942
- Cloncurry Airport, Queensland, Australia, 29 March 1942
- Longreach Airport, Queensland, Australia, 18 May 1942
- Mareeba Airfield, Queensland, Australia, 23 July–c. 25 October 1942
- Pocatello Army Air Field, Idaho, c. 28 December 1942
- Pyote Army Air Base, Texas, c. 18 January 1943 – 1 April 1944
- Great Bend Army Air Field, Kansas, 1 April – 7 December 1944
- North Field, Guam (later Anderson Air Force Base), 16 January 1945
- Kadena Air Base, Okinawa, 27 June 1950 – 18 May 1954
- Pinecastle Air Force Base, Florida, c. 2 June 1954
- Homestead Air Force Base, Florida, c. 25 June 1956
- Kincheloe Air Force Base, Michigan, 1 August 1961 – 1 February 1963
- Barksdale Air Force Base, Louisiana, 1 October 1993 – present

=== Aircraft operated ===
- SPAD S.XIII (1918)
- SPAD S.VII (1918)
- B-17 Flying Fortress (1939–1944)
- Douglas B-18 Bolo (1939–1941)
- Consolidated B-24 Liberator (1941–1942)
- LB-30 (1941–1942)
- Boeing B-29 Superfortress (1944–1954)
- B-47 Stratojet (1954–1961)
- B-52 Stratofortress (1961–1963, 1993–Present)

== See also ==
- Leslie Rummell
- Chester Wright
- Charles R. d'Olive
- List of American Aero Squadrons
- List of B-52 Units of the United States Air Force
