= 40th Tactical Squadron =

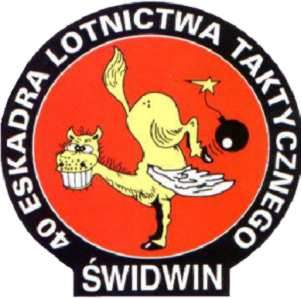
- 40.ELT Logo
- Active: 2000 - present
- Country: Poland
- Allegiance: Polish Air Force
- Type: Tactical Squadron
- Role: Attack
- Base: 21st Tactical Air Base

Commanders
- Squadron Leader: Col. pil.Ireneusz Łyczek

Aircraft flown
- Attack: Su-22 M4K, Su-22 M3K
- Trainer: PZL TS-11 Iskra

40th Tactical Squadron (known as 40.ELT - 40 Eskadra Lotnictwa Taktycznego in Poland) is a fighter squadron of Polish Air Force established in 2000. Squadron is stationed in 21st Air Base and operates 18 Sukhoi Su-22 ground attack aircraft.
