= 40th Division =

40th Division or 40th Infantry Division may refer to:

== Infantry divisions ==
- 40th Division (German Empire), Imperial German Army
- 40th Infantry Division "Cacciatori d'Africa", Italian division of World War II
- 40th Division (Imperial Japanese Army)
- 40th Infantry Division (Russian Empire)
- 40th Guards Rifle Division, Soviet Union
- 40th Rifle Division, Soviet Union
- 40th Division (Syria)
- 40th Division (United Kingdom)
- 40th Infantry Division (United States)
- 40th Division (Yugoslav Partisans)
- 40th Infantry Division Slavonska, Yugoslav Army

== Armoured divisions ==
- 40th Armored Division, United States

== Artillery divisions ==
- 40th Anti-Aircraft Artillery Division, Soviet Union

== Aviation divisions ==
- 40th Air Division, United States Air Force

== See also ==
- List of military divisions by number
- 40th Brigade (disambiguation)
- 40th Regiment (disambiguation)
- 40th Battalion (disambiguation)
- 40th Squadron (disambiguation)
