= 40th Anti-Aircraft Artillery Division =

- Active: June 1943–August 1945
- Country: Soviet Union
- Branch: Red Army
- Type: Anti-Aircraft Artillery
- Engagements: World War II: Svir-Petrozavodsk Offensive; Petsamo-Kirkenes Offensive
- Decorations: Order of the Red Banner
- Battle honours: Pechenga

The 40th Anti-Aircraft Artillery Division (Russian: 40-я зенитная артиллерийская дивизия) was an anti-aircraft artillery division of the Soviet Union's Red Army during World War II. Formed in the Volga Military District in June 1943, the division was sent into combat a year later with the 7th Army, fighting in the Svir-Petrozavodsk Offensive. The division then transferred to the 14th Army in October, and fought in the Petsamo–Kirkenes Offensive. After the end of the offensive the division served with the army in northern Norway until the end of the war. The division was disbanded postwar.

== History ==
The division was formed in June 1943 in the Volga Military District. It included the 1407th, 1411th, 1415th, and the 1527th Anti-Aircraft Artillery Regiments. Its first and only wartime commander, Colonel Ivan Khramov, was assigned on 30 August.

The division was part of the active army from 12 June 1944, and was sent to the Karelian Front's 7th Army. The division fought in the Svir-Petrozavodsk Offensive from late June. From September the division was part of the 14th Army. The division fought in the Petsamo–Kirkenes Offensive in October. The division fought in the capture of Petsamo on 15 October and was awarded the honorific "Pechenga" for its actions. The division then fought in the capture of Kirkenes, and its 1411th Regiment, commanded by Lieutenant Colonel Pavel Stavoverov, was awarded the honorific "Kirkenes". For its actions at Kirkenes, the 40th also received the Order of the Red Banner on 14 November. After the capture of Petsamo and Kirkenes the combat role of the 14th Army was finished and it advanced into Norway. The division served with the army until the end of the war.

The division was disbanded in the Belomorsky Military District together with its 1411th, 1415th, and 1527th Regiments in August 1945. Khramov later took command of the 47th Anti-Aircraft Artillery Division in November.
