= 40 Squadron =

40 Squadron, No. 40 Squadron or 40th Squadron may refer to:

- No. 40 Squadron RAAF, a unit of the Australian Air Force
- 40th Squadron Heli (Belgium), a unit of the Belgian Air Force
- No. 40 Squadron RNZAF, a unit of the Royal New Zealand Air Force
- 40th Tactical Squadron, a unit of the Polish Air Force
- No. 40 Squadron SAAF, a unit of the South African Air Force
- No. 40 Squadron RAF, a unit of the United Kingdom Royal Air Force
- 40th Flight Test Squadron, a unit of the United States Air Force
- 40th Airlift Squadron, a unit of the United States Air Force

== See also ==
- 40th Division (disambiguation)
- 40th Brigade (disambiguation)
- 40th Regiment (disambiguation)
- 40th Battalion (disambiguation)
