= 40th Street =

40th Street may refer to:

- 40th Street (Newport Beach), an attraction in Newport Beach, California

== See also ==
- 40th Street station
