= 40th Battalion =

40th Battalion may refer to:

- 40th Battalion (Australia), an infantry battalion 1916–1987
- 40th Battalion (Nova Scotia), CEF, a Canadian infantry battalion during World War I
- Sparrow Force (2/40th Australian Infantry Battalion), a unit of the Australian Army
- 40 Commando, a unit of the United Kingdom Royal Marine Corps

== See also ==
- 40th Division (disambiguation)
- 40th Brigade (disambiguation)
- 40th Regiment (disambiguation)
- 40th Squadron (disambiguation)
