= 40th Regiment =

40th Regiment, 40th Infantry Regiment or 40th Armoured Regiment may refer to:

== Infantry regiments ==
- 40th (2nd Somersetshire) Regiment of Foot, a unit of the United Kingdom Army
- 40th Infantry Regiment, a unit of the United States Army

== Armoured regiments ==
- 40th Armor Regiment, a unit of the United States Army
- 40th Cavalry Regiment, a unit of the United States Army
- 40th (The King's) Royal Tank Regiment, a unit of the United Kingdom Army
- 40th/41st Royal Tank Regiment, a unit of the United Kingdom Army

== Artillery regiments ==
- 40th Regiment Royal Artillery, a unit of the United Kingdom Army

== Aviation regiments ==
- 40th Fighter Aviation Regiment, a unit of the Yugoslav Air Force

== Communications regiments ==
- 40 (Ulster) Signal Regiment, a unit of the United Kingdom Army

== American Civil War regiments ==
- 40th Illinois Volunteer Infantry Regiment, a unit of the Union (Northern) Army during the American Civil War
- 40th Iowa Volunteer Infantry Regiment, a unit of the Union (Northern) Army during the American Civil War
- 40th Wisconsin Volunteer Infantry Regiment, a unit of the Union (Northern) Army during the American Civil War
- 40th New York Volunteer Infantry Regiment, a unit of the Union (Northern) Army during the American Civil War

== See also ==
- 40th Division (disambiguation)
- 40th Brigade (disambiguation)
- 40th Battalion (disambiguation)
- 40th Squadron (disambiguation)
