= 40th Brigade =

40th Brigade may refer to:

== British India ==
- 40th Indian Infantry Brigade

== Russia/Soviet Union ==
- 40th Air Assault Brigade
- 40th Separate Guards Naval Infantry Brigade, a unit of the Russian Navy

== Ukraine ==
- 40th Artillery Brigade (Ukraine)
- 40th Marine Brigade (Ukraine)
- 40th Tactical Aviation Brigade, an aviation unit of the Ukrainian Air Force

== United Kingdom ==
- 40th Anti-Aircraft Brigade (United Kingdom)
- 40th Brigade (United Kingdom)
- 40th Brigade Royal Field Artillery

== United States ==
- 40th Combat Aviation Brigade
- 40th Division Sustainment Brigade
- 40th Infantry Brigade Combat Team (United States), a unit of the United States Army

== See also ==
- 40th Division (disambiguation)
- 40th Regiment (disambiguation)
- 40th Battalion (disambiguation)
- 40th Squadron (disambiguation)
