= 912th Air Refueling Squadron =

912th Air Refueling Squadron

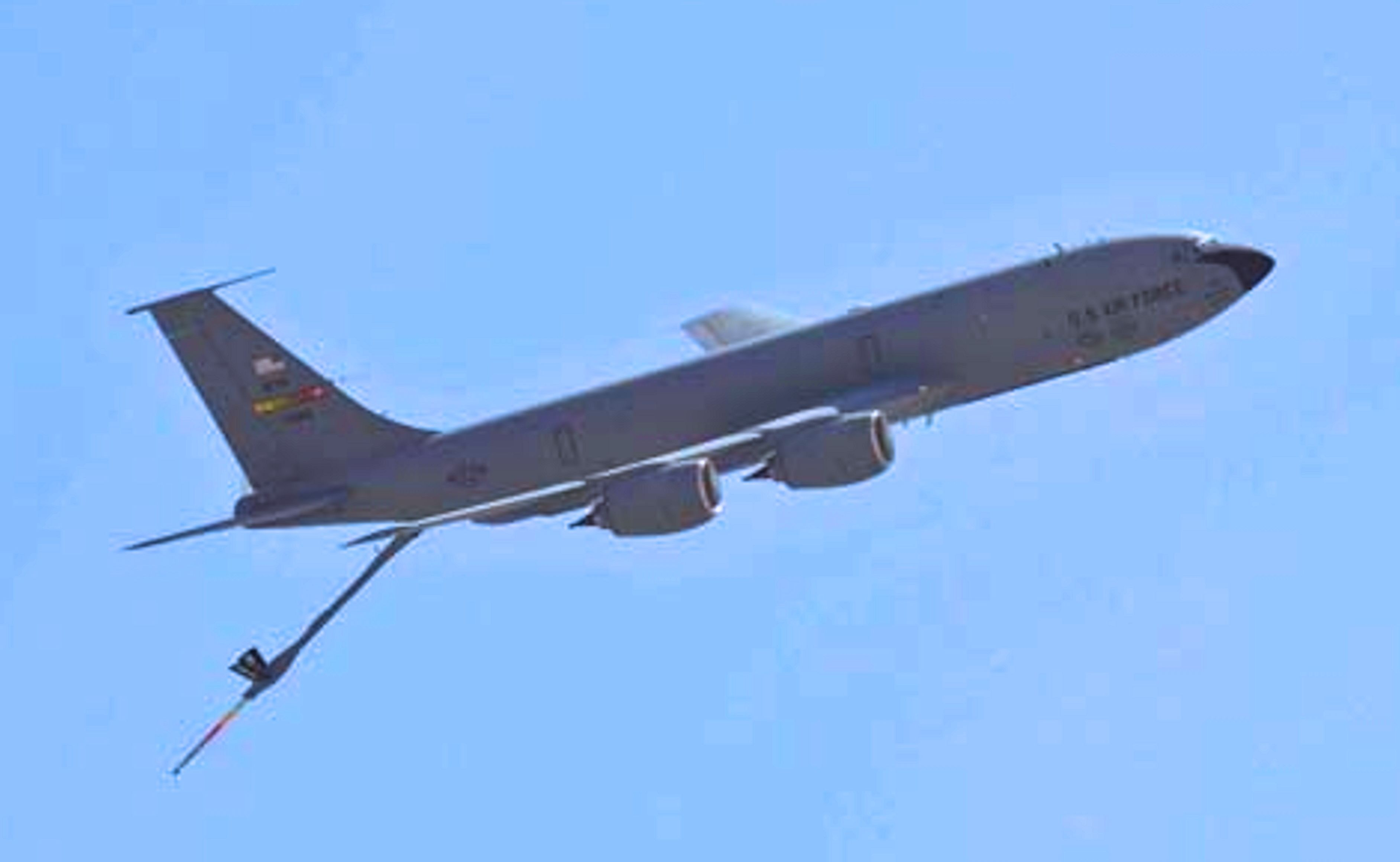
- 452d Air Mobility Wing KC-135 Stratotanker. The 912th is an active duty associate of the 452nd
- Active: 1942–1945; 1947–1949; 1961–present
- Country: United States
- Branch: United States Air Force
- Role: Air Refueling
- Size: Approximately 30 aircrew and 130 maintainers
- Part of: Air Mobility Command; 4th Air Force; 452d Air Mobility Wing; 452d Operations Group
- Garrison/HQ: March Air Reserve Base
- Engagements: European Theater of World War II
- Decorations: Distinguished Unit Citation; Air Force Outstanding Unit Award

Insignia
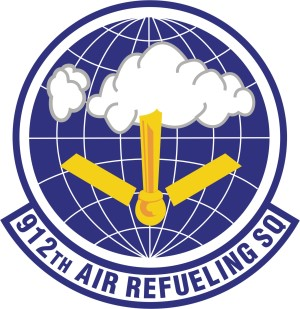
- 912th Air Refueling Squadron emblem (Note: Approved 28 September 1964, slightly modified 27 August 2007. Description: On an Air Force Blue globe with White grid lines, two White clouds, detailed and shaded Silver Gray, fesswise above center of globe, small cloud in far dexter, large cloud extends from center dexter to far distant sinister issuant from large cloud above center point of globe palewise an Air Force Yellow refueling boom tip shaded Tangerine, all within a White band with a narrow Air Force Blue border. Endicott, p. 892.)

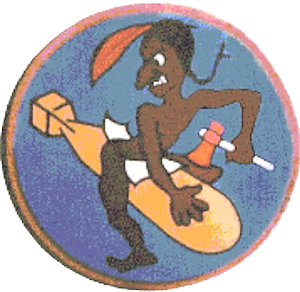
- 412th Bombardment Squadron emblem(World War II)
- World War II Squadron fuselage code (Note: After December 1944, squadrons of the 95th Bombardment Group no longer displayed their fuselage codes. Watkins, p. 42): QW
- World War II 95th group tail code: Square B

Aircraft flown
- Tanker: Boeing KC-135 Stratotanker

The 912th Air Refueling Squadron is a United States Air Force squadron assigned to the 92d Operations Group and stationed at March Air Reserve Base, California. The squadron is an active duty associate unit of the reserve 336th Air Refueling Squadron of the 452d Operations Group.

The squadron was first activated in June 1942 as the 412th Bombardment Squadron. It saw combat in the European Theater of World War II, where it was assigned to the 95th Bombardment Group, the only group in Eighth Air Force to earn three Distinguished Unit Citations.

The 912th Air Refueling Squadron was activated in late 1961 as the air refueling element of the 4137th Strategic Wing and has been active since then. During the Cold War the squadron maintained a portion of its strength on alert. It also supported airborne alert operations during the 1980s.

In 1985 the 412th Bombardment Squadron was consolidated with the 912th Air Refueling Squadron, making them a single unit. The consolidated squadron has supported contingency operations, including Operation Urgent Fury and Operation Just Cause. It participated in combat in Southeast Asia from 1990 to 1991.

== Overview ==
The squadron operates Boeing KC-135 Stratotanker aircraft assigned to Air Force Reserve Command at March Air Force Base, California along with air reservists, conducting air refueling and other air mobility missions. Its personnel also augment maintainers in the reserve 452d Maintenance Group and augment the reserve 452d Air Mobility Wing life support, intelligence, supply, command post, crew communications, medical and support staff.

== History ==
=== World War II ===
==== Training in the United States ====
The squadron was constituted in early 1942 as the 22d Reconnaissance Squadron. Since a reorganization of General Headquarters Air Force in September 1936, each bombardment group of the Army Air Forces (AAF) had an attached reconnaissance squadron, which operated the same aircraft as that group's assigned bombardment squadrons. However, it was renamed the 412th Bombardment Squadron before activating at Barksdale Field, Louisiana in June as one of the four original squadrons of the 95th Bombardment Group. The squadron began training in August at Geiger Field, Washington, where it was equipped with Boeing B-17 Flying Fortresses. The unit trained for combat operations until moving overseas starting in March.

The air echelon processed at Kearney Army Air Field, Nebraska and flew its Forts via the southern route, flying to Florida, Trinidad, the northern coast of Brazil, Dakar, Senegal, and Marrakesh, Morocco to RAF Alconbury in the United Kingdom. The ground echelon moved to Camp Kilmer, then sailed on the RMS Queen Elizabeth to Scotland, arriving in May. The squadron then reunited at RAF Framlingham.

==== Combat with Eighth Air Force ====
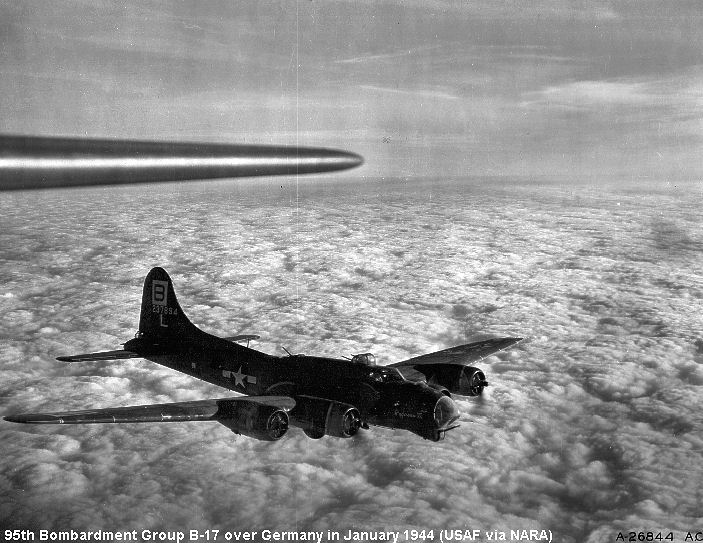
95th Bombardment Group B-17 over Germany showing Square B tail marking

The squadron arrived in England equipped with late model B-17F aircraft equipped with "Tokyo Tanks", additional fuel cells located outboard in the wings that gave this model additional range. It flew its first combat mission on 13 May 1943 against an airfield near Saint-Omer, France. For the next two months the squadron focused on attacking airfields and V-1 flying bomb launch sites in France.

Eighth Air Force's early experience with its Martin B-26 Marauders convinced it that the Marauders were stationed too far from the continent of Europe to reach a selection of targets. It determined to move them closer to the target areas, and an exchange of bases began. The entire 95th group moved to RAF Horham in June, where they replaced the 323d Bombardment Group, which departed the previous day. A few days later their place at Framlingham was taken by the newly arrived 390th Bombardment Group.

The 412th began strategic bombing operations in July and continued until flying its last operation on 20 April 1945. Its targets included harbors, marshalling yards and other industrial targets along with attacks on cities. The squadron received its first Distinguished Unit Citation (DUC) during an attack on an aircraft factory at Regensburg, Germany on 17 August 1943 when it maintained its defensive formation despite severe attacks by enemy interceptor aircraft.

On 10 October, during an attack on marshalling yards at Münster, Germany, the squadron was subjected to concentrated fighter attacks on the approach to the target and intense flak over the objective. Despite these obstacles, the group's bombs were clustered close to the target. It was awarded a second DUC for withstanding these attacks to bomb its objective. From 20 to 25 February 1944 the group participated in the Big Week offensive against the German aircraft manufacturing industry. A few days later, on 4 March, the squadron attacked Berlin despite adverse weather that led other units to either abandon the operation or attack secondary targets. Despite snowstorms and heavy cloud cover, the unit struck its target while under attack from enemy fighters, although the cloud cover required the group to rely on a pathfinder from the 482d Bombardment Group to determine the release point. It received its third DUC for this operation. This mission was the first time any unit from Eighth Air Force had bombed Berlin.

The squadron was diverted to bombing priority tactical targets during the preparation for and execution of Operation Overlord, the invasion of Normandy in June 1944, attacking communications and coastal defenses. It hit enemy troop concentrations to facilitate the Allied breakout at Saint-Lô. The 412th attacked enemy troop concentrations during the Battle of the Bulge from December 1944 to January 1945 and bombed airfields to support Operation Varsity, the airborne assault across the Rhine in March.

One of the unit's more unusual missions was flown on 18 September 1944, when it led the 13th Combat Bombardment Wing to Warsaw to drop ammunition, food and medical supplies to Polish Resistance forces fighting against German occupation forces. The squadron had previously participated in shuttle missions to the Soviet Union.

The unit flew its last mission on 20 April 1945, when it attacked marshalling yards near Oranienburg. In the first week of May, it airdropped food to Dutch citizens in Operation Chow Hound. From V-E Day until departing the theater in June, it transported liberated prisoners of war and displaced persons. The air echelon flew their planes back to Bradley Field, Connecticut, while the ground echelon sailed once more on the Queen Elizabeth. The squadron was reunited at Sioux Falls Army Air Field, South Dakota, where it was inactivated on 28 August 1945.

=== Air Force Reserve ===
The 412th Bombardment Squadron was reactivated as a reserve unit under Air Defense Command (ADC) at Knoxville Municipal Airport, Tennessee in July 1947 as a Boeing B-29 Superfortress unit. It is not clear whether or not the squadron was fully staffed or equipped. In 1948 Continental Air Command assumed responsibility for managing reserve units from ADC. The 412th was inactivated when Continental Air Command reorganized its reserve units under the wing base organization system in June 1949 and ended its reserve flying operations at Knoxville.

=== Strategic Air Command ===
The 912th Air Refueling Squadron was activated in December 1961 at Robins Air Force Base, Georgia, where it was assigned to the 4137th Strategic Wing and equipped with Boeing KC-135 Stratotankers. The 4137th wing was established by SAC in a program to disperse its Boeing B-52 Stratofortress bombers over a larger number of bases, thus making it more difficult for the Soviet Union to knock out the entire fleet with a surprise first strike. The squadron provided air refueling primarily to the B-52s of the 4137th wing. Once the squadron became combat ready, one third of the squadron's aircraft were maintained on fifteen-minute alert, fully fueled and ready for combat to reduce vulnerability to a Soviet missile strike. This was increased to half the squadron's aircraft in 1962. 912th continued to maintain an alert commitment until the end of the Cold War, except for periods it deployed aircraft to support other operations. The squadron also conducted world wide air refueling missions.

In February 1963, The newly activated 465th Bombardment Wing assumed the aircraft, personnel and equipment of the discontinued 4137th wing. The 4137th was a Major Command controlled (MAJCON) wing, which could not carry a permanent history or lineage, and SAC wanted to replace it with a permanent unit. The 912th was reassigned to the 465th wing. As the need for refueling support of tactical aircraft in Southeast Asia increased, the squadron deployed crews and aircraft to support Operation Young Tiger in Thailand.

A little over five years later, when SAC terminated operations at Homestead Air Force Base, Florida and transferred the base to Tactical Air Command, it moved the 19th Bombardment Wing on paper to Robins, where it took over the assets of the 465th wing and became the 912th's new parent.

The 912th provided crews and planes to support the Alaskan, European and Pacific Tanker Task Forces. It supported Operation Urgent Fury, the restoration of the government of Grenada on 23 and 24 October 1983. The unit also flew EC–135 airborne command post missions from 1984 to 1989 for United States Central Command. These missions included deployed missions flown in the Middle East. In September 1985 the 912th Air Refueling Squadron was consolidated with the 412th Bombardment Squadron.

Starting in 1986 the squadron began to replace the KC-135A aircraft it had been flying for 25 years with re-engined KC-135Rs. The 912th supported Operation Just Cause, the United States incursion into Panama to replace Manuel Noriega's government from 18 to 21 December 1989. It participated in combat in Southwest Asia from August 1990 until March 1991, where its crews and tankers operated primarily as part of the 1701st Air Refueling Wing, Provisional.

=== Air Mobility Command ===
With the inactivation of SAC in June 1992, most of its air refueling assets, including the 912th, were transferred to Air Mobility Command. In 1994 the 912th moved without personnel or equipment to Grand Forks Air Force Base, North Dakota as Robins prepared to replace its refueling wing with a J-STARS unit At Grand Forks it was reassigned to the 319th Operations Group as the third tanker squadron of the 319th Air Refueling Wing, which was being transformed into a "super tanker wing."

With the 319th the squadron deployed KC-135Rs and crews to support tanker activities in Operation Deny Flight, the United Nations no-fly zone over Bosnia and Herzegovina; Operation Uphold Democracy, the United Nations action to remove the military junta and restore the elected president of Haiti; and Operation Constant Vigil from Howard Air Force Base in Panama. In 1995 the squadron deployed to Riyadh, Saudi Arabia to support Operation Southern Watch the Southwest Asia Task Force operation to monitor and control airspace in southern Iraq. From June through August 2000 the squadron moved its operations to MacDill Air Force Base, Florida while the runways at Grand Forks were being repaired.

After the 11 September 2001 attacks, the 912th contributed personnel and aircraft to the 319th Air Expeditionary Group in support of homeland defense.

The squadron was reduced to cadre status on 20 March 2009 pursuant to Base Realignment and Closure 2005 action which directed the transition of Grand Forks AFB from an air refueling mission to an unmanned reconnaissance aircraft mission with the RQ-4 Global Hawk.

An advance party arrived at March Air Reserve Base, California in October 2010, and began to organize the squadron once again. However, it was not until December that the ceremony to mark the 912th's new status as an active associate organization, an active duty Regular Air Force flying unit operating the same aircraft as the 336th Air Refueling Squadron and operationally controlled by the 452d Air Mobility Wing, was celebrated. The 912th is under the administrative control of the active duty 92d Air Refueling Wing at Fairchild Air Force Base, Washington.

== Lineage ==
412th Bombardment Squadron

- Constituted as the 22d Reconnaissance Squadron (Heavy) on 28 January 1942

Redesignated 412th Bombardment Squadron (Heavy) on 22 April 1942

- Activated on 15 June 1942

Redesignated 412th Bombardment Squadron, Heavy on 20 August 1943

- Inactivated on 28 August 1945

Redesignated 412th Bombardment Squadron, Very Heavy on 9 July 1947

- Activated in the Reserve on 16 July 1947
- Inactivated on 27 June 1949
- Consolidated on 19 September 1985 with the 912th Air Refueling Squadron as the 912th Air Refueling Squadron

912th Air Refueling Squadron

- Constituted as the 912th Air Refueling Squadron, Heavy on 3 August 1961 and activated (not organized)
- Organized on 1 December 1961
- Consolidated on 19 September 1985 with the 412th Bombardment Squadron

Redesignated 912th Air Refueling Squadron on 1 September 1991

=== Assignments ===
- 95th Bombardment Group, 15 June 1942 – 28 August 1945
- 95th Bombardment Group, 16 July 1947 – 27 June 1949
- Strategic Air Command, 3 August 1961 (not organized)
- 4137th Strategic Wing, 1 December 1961
- 465th Bombardment Wing, 1 February 1963
- 19th Bombardment Wing (later 19th Air Refueling) Wing), 25 July 1968
- 19th Operations Group, 1 September 1991
- 319th Operations Group, 1 April 1994
- 92d Operations Group, 1 October 2010 – Present

=== Stations ===
- Barksdale Field, Louisiana, 15 June 1942
- Pendleton Field, Oregon, 26 June 1942
- Geiger Field, Washington, 28 August 1942
- Ephrata Army Air Base, Washington, 31 October 1942
- Geiger Field, Washington, 24 November 1942
- Rapid City Army Air Base, South Dakota, 17 December 1942 – 18 April 1943
- RAF Framlingham (AAF-153), England, 11 May 1943
- RAF Horham (AAF-119), England, 15 June 1943 – 6 August 1945
- Sioux Falls Army Airfield, South Dakota, 14 August 1945 – 28 August 1945
- Knoxville Municipal Airport, Tennessee, 16 July 1947 – 27 June 1949
- Robins Air Force Base, Georgia, 1 December 1961
- Grand Forks Air Force Base, North Dakota, 1 April 1994
- March Air Reserve Base, California, 1 October 2010 – Present

=== Aircraft ===
- Boeing B-17 Flying Fortress, 1942–1945
- Boeing KC-135 Stratotanker, 1962 – present
- Boeing EC-135, 1984–1989

=== Awards and campaigns ===
Award streamer	Award	Dates	Notes
	Distinguished Unit Citation, Regensburg, Germany	17 August 1943	412th Bombardment Squadron
	Distinguished Unit Citation, Münster, Germany	10 October 1943	412th Bombardment Squadron
	Distinguished Unit Citation, Berlin, Germany	4 March 1944	412th Bombardment Squadron
	Air Force Outstanding Unit Award	[1 December] 1961-31 March 1962	912th Air Refueling Squadron
	Air Force Outstanding Unit Award	1 July 1976 – 30 June 1978	912th Air Refueling Squadron
	Air Force Outstanding Unit Award	1 July 1982 – 30 June 1984	912th Air Refueling Squadron
	Air Force Outstanding Unit Award	1 July 1984 – 30 June 1986	912th Air Refueling Squadron
	Air Force Outstanding Unit Award	1 October 1993 – 30 June 1995	912th Air Refueling Squadron
	Air Force Outstanding Unit Award	1 July 1995 – 30 June 1997	912th Air Refueling Squadron
	Air Force Outstanding Unit Award	1 July 2000 – 30 June 2002	912th Air Refueling Squadron
	Air Force Outstanding Unit Award	1 July 2002 – 30 June 2004	912th Air Refueling Squadron
	Air Force Outstanding Unit Award	1 July 2004 – 30 June 2005	912th Air Refueling Squadron
	Air Force Outstanding Unit Award	1 July 2005 – 30 June 2006	912th Air Refueling Squadron
	Air Force Outstanding Unit Award	1 July 2006 – 30 June 2007	912th Air Refueling Squadron
	Air Force Outstanding Unit Award	1 July 2007 – 20 March 2009	912th Air Refueling Squadron
	Air Force Outstanding Unit Award	1 August 2011 – 31 August 2012	912th Air Refueling Squadron
	Air Force Outstanding Unit Award	1 September 2012 – 31 August 2013	912th Air Refueling Squadron

Campaign Streamer	Campaign	Dates	Notes
	Air Offensive, Europe	11 May 1943 – 5 June 1944	412th Bombardment Squadron
	Normandy	6 June 1944 – 24 July 1944	412th Bombardment Squadron
	Northern France	25 July 1944 – 14 September 1944	412th Bombardment Squadron
	Rhineland	15 September 1944 – 21 March 1945	412th Bombardment Squadron
	Ardennes-Alsace	16 December 1944 – 25 January 1945	412th Bombardment Squadron
	Central Europe	22 March 1944 – 21 May 1945	412th Bombardment Squadron
	Air Combat, EAME Theater	11 May 1943 – 11 May 1945	412th Bombardment Squadron
	Defense of Saudi Arabia	2 August 1990 – 16 January 1991	912th Air Refueling Squadron
	Liberation and Defense of Kuwait	17 January 1991 – 11 April 1991	912th Air Refueling Squadron

== See also ==
- B-17 Flying Fortress units of the United States Army Air Forces
- List of MAJCOM wings of the United States Air Force
- List of United States Air Force air refueling squadrons
