= 822d Air Division =

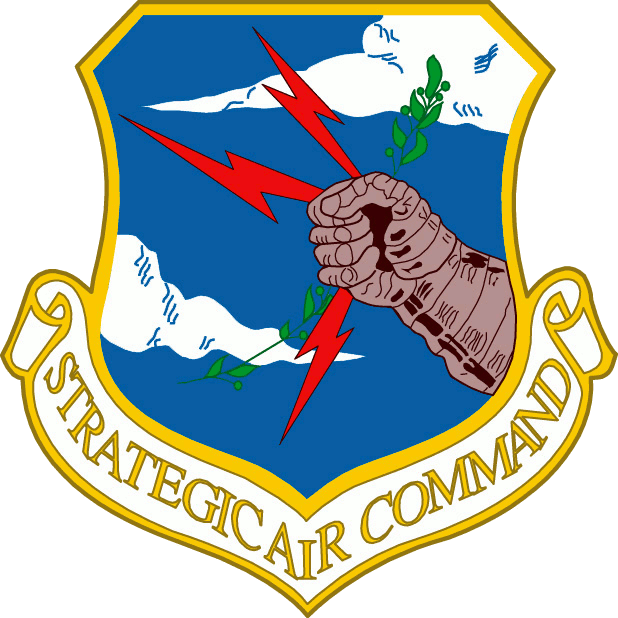
822d Air Division

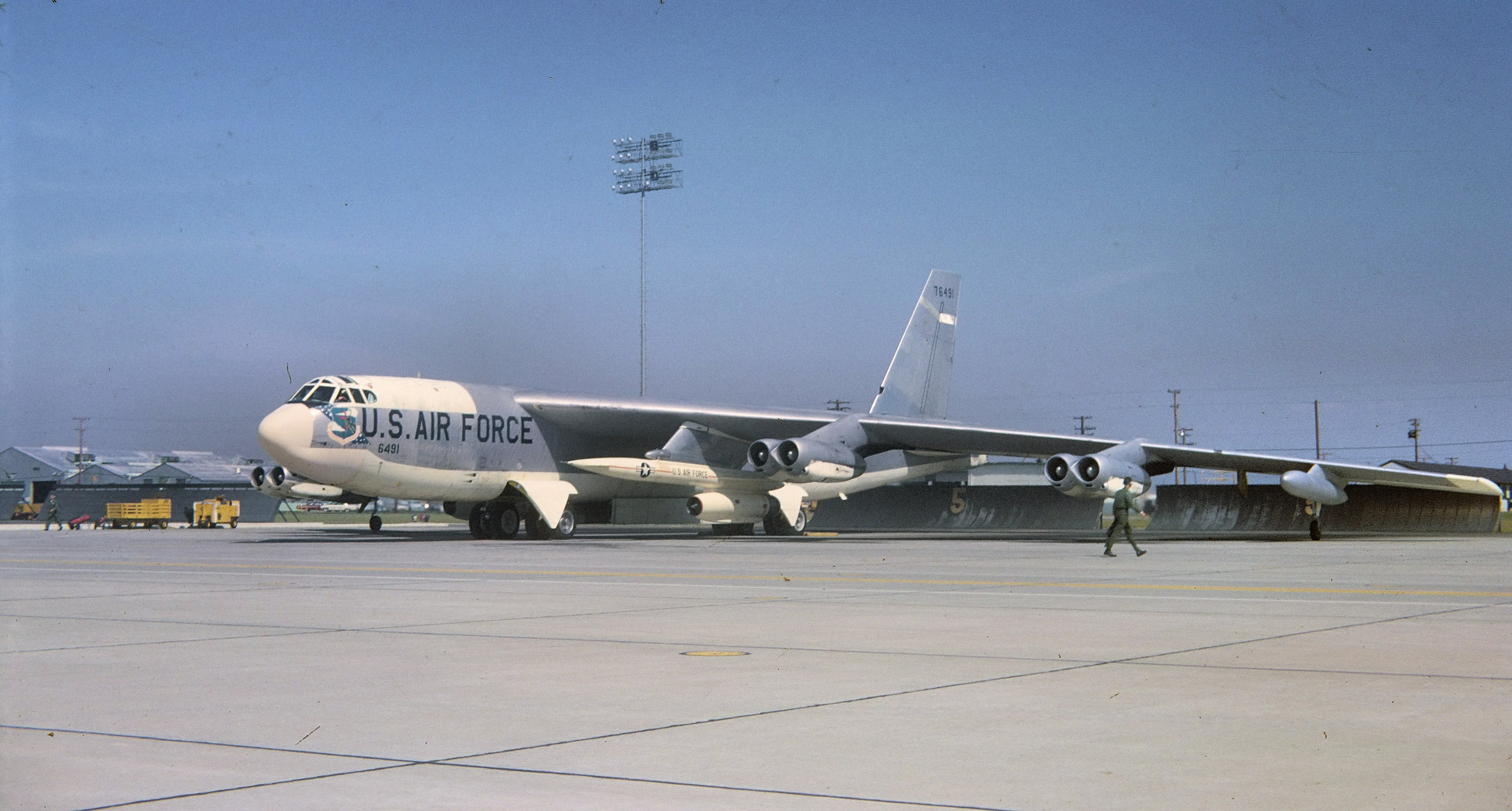
- B-52G with GAM-77 Hound Dog missiles as tested by the division's 4135th Strategic Wing
- Active: 1958–1966
- Country: United States
- Branch: United States Air Force
- Role: Command of strategic strike forces
- Part of: Strategic Air Command

Commanders
- Notable commanders: Jack J. Catton

Insignia
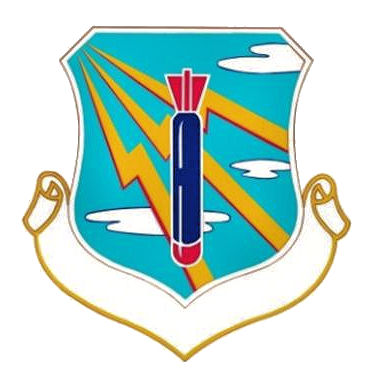
- 822d Air Division emblem (approved 5 August 1959)

The 822d Air Division is an inactive United States Air Force organization. Its last assignment was with Strategic Air Command (SAC) at Turner Air Force Base, Georgia, where it was inactivated on 2 September 1966.

The division was formed to command four strategic wings that were formed in the Southeastern United States as part of SAC's program to disperse its B-52 force to minimize attrition from a possible Soviet first strike. Once the division's wings were organized and equipped, they maintained a portion of their aircraft on airborne and ground alert. During the Cuban Missile Crisis, all combat aircraft of the division were placed on increased alert status. In addition to its SAC mission, the division's wing at Eglin Air Force Base, Florida was involved in testing armament for the Boeing B-52 Stratofortress.

The division was inactivated in 1966 as SAC began to withdraw its older B-52s from operational service.

== History ==
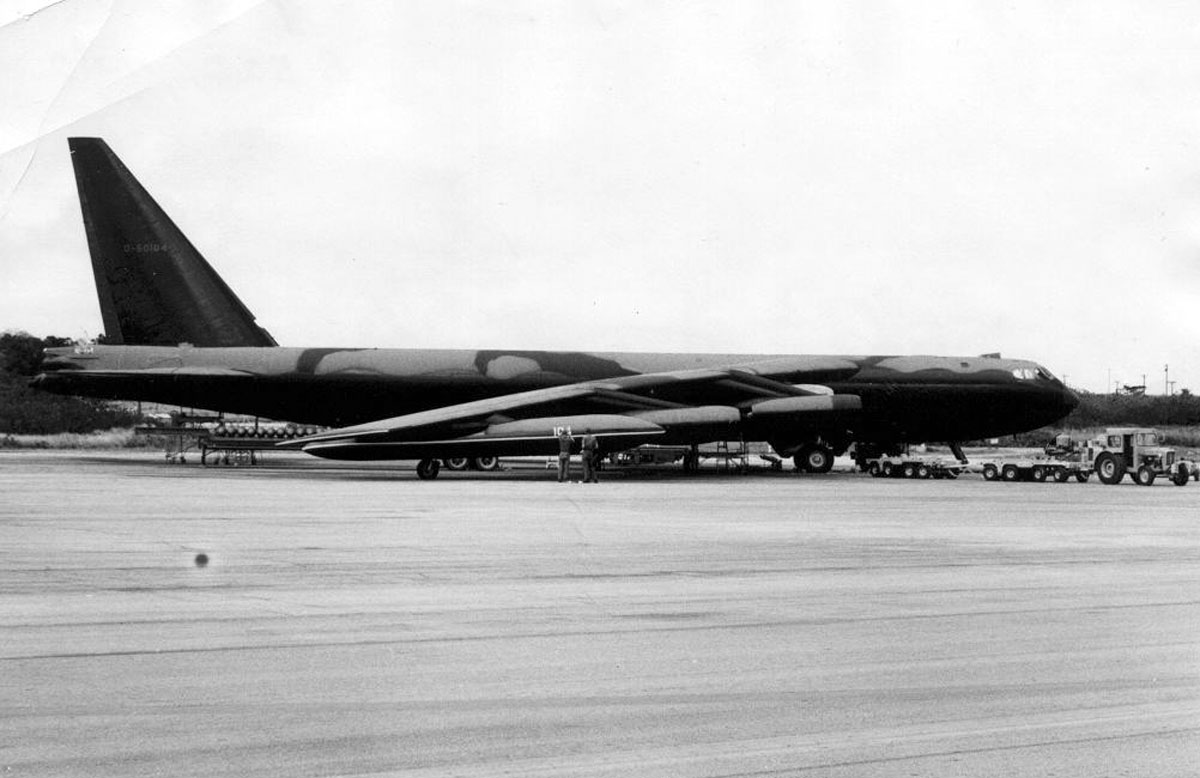
Boeing B-52D of the division's 484th Bombardment Wing deployed at Andersen AFB, Guam

As Strategic Air Command (SAC) began to equip with the Boeing B-52 Stratofortress, it was concerned that bases with large concentrations of the new jet bombers made attractive targets. SAC's response was to break up its B-52 wings and scatter their aircraft over a larger number of bases, thus making it more difficult for the Soviet Union to knock out the entire fleet with a surprise first strike. In 1959, Tactical Air Command (TAC) was in the process of withdrawing its fighters from Turner Air Force Base, which had been a SAC fighter aircraft and reconnaissance base until the spring of 1957. On 1 January 1959, SAC resumed control of Turner and activated the 822d Air Division and 4138th Strategic Wing to prepare Turner for the arrival of SAC heavy bombers and tankers. The 4134th Strategic Wing at Eglin Air Force Base, Florida and the 4241st Strategic Wing at Seymour Johnson Air Force Base, North Carolina, both of which had been organized a few months earlier, were also assigned to the division when it activated. Six months later, the 4137th Strategic Wing at Robins Air Force Base, Georgia was organized and assigned to the 822d. None of these bases had served as heavy bomber locations before, and only Turner belonged to SAC. Eglin was an Air Force Systems Command base, Seymour Johnson was a TAC base, and Robins was an Air Force Logistics Command base.

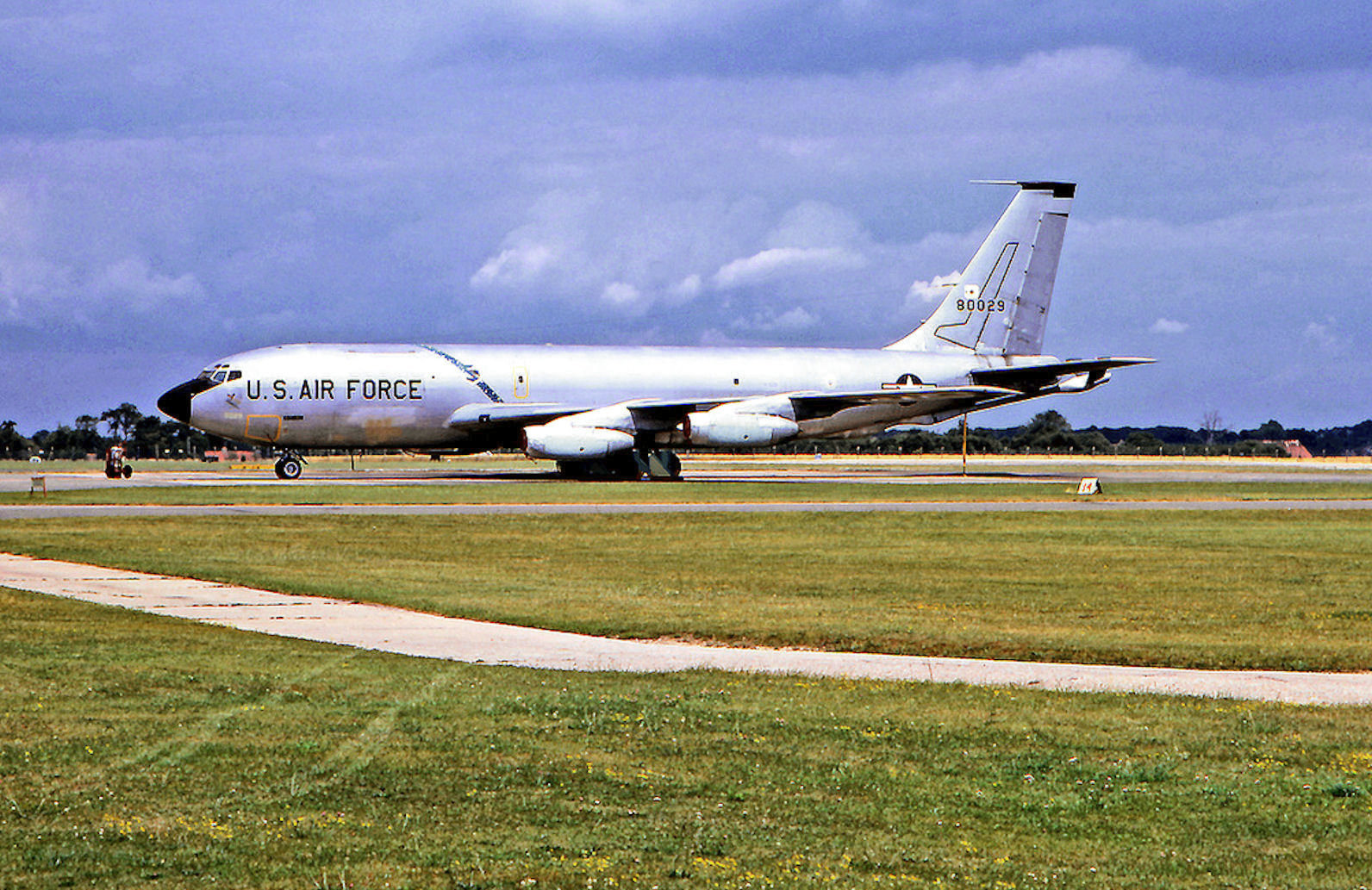
KC-135A of the division's 911th Air Refueling Squadron

However, the establishment of wings did not immediately disperse the bomber force. Although the 73d Bombardment Squadron moved to Seymour Johnson from Ramey Air Force Base, Puerto Rico five days after the division activated, it was not until summer that the wings at Turner and Eglin were able to activate their B-52 squadrons, and the 342d Bombardment Squadron did not move to Robins from Blytheville Air Force Base, Arkansas until May 1960. By February 1960, all wings except for the 4137th were combat ready. The B-52 squadron moves were paper moves only, and each unit began to equip and train with the Stratofortress from scratch. It would be the end of December 1960 before all the division's squadrons were fully equipped. As their squadrons became combat ready, one third of each wing's aircraft were maintained on fifteen-minute alert, fully fueled, armed and ready for combat to reduce vulnerability to a Soviet missile strike. This was increased to half their aircraft in 1962.

The division conducted long range bombardment training missions from activation through inactivation. Because of its location at Eglin Air Force Base, home of the Air Poriving Ground Center, the 4135th wing (and later the 39th) would be involved with operational testing of weapons for the B-52. One of the first of these was the GAM-77 Hound Dog missile, which would eventually equip all four of the division's wings. The 4135th wing was flying borrowed B-52s even before its 301st Bombardment Squadron was assigned, with Hound Dog testing as its initial mission. The division conducted numerous staff assistance visits and monitored tactical exercises, including Operation Chrome Dome, B-52 airborne alert operations.

On 20 October 1962, at the start of the Cuban Missile Crisis, each of the division's wings were directed to put two additional B-52s on alert. Two days later 1/8 of the B-52s were placed on airborne alert. Additional division KC-135s were placed on alert to replace KC-135s devoted to maintaining the increased B-52 bomber force on airborne alert. On 24 October SAC went to DEFCON 2, placing all aircraft on alert. This posture was maintained until 21 November, when SAC returned to its normal airborne alert status and assumed DEFCON 3, but the 822d maintained an increased number of bombers and tankers on ground alert for another week.

The division's three strategic wings were Major Command controlled (MAJCON) units that could not carry a permanent history or lineage. SAC received authority from Headquarters USAF to discontinue them and activate Air Force controlled (AFCON) units to replace them without altering their missions. On 1 February 1963, the 39th Bombardment Wing replaced the 4135th at Eglin, the 68th Bombardment Wing replaced the 4241st at Seymour Johnson the 465th Bombardment Wing replaced the 4137th at Robins, and the 484th Bombardment Wing replaced the 4138th at Turner. Each of the new wings absorbed the personnel and aircraft of their predecessors.

In June 1965, the 39th Bombardment Wing was inactivated and its bombers moved to Barksdale Air Force Base, Louisiana. The division formed Detachment 1, 822d Air Division at Eglin to wind up SAC B-52 operations there. The division was inactivated in the fall of 1966 as Turner prepared for closure and its subordinate wings were reassigned to the 57th Air Division. The inactivation was originally planned for July 1967, but this was accelerated with the phase out of early model B-52s from the Air Force inventory.

== Lineage ==
- Established as the 822 Air Division on 22 August 1958

Activated on 1 January 1959
Discontinued and inactivated on 2 September 1966

=== Assignments ===
- Eighth Air Force, 1 January 1959 – 2 September 1966

=== Stations ===
- Turner Air Force Base, Georgia, 1 January 1959 – 2 September 1966

=== Components ===
Wings

- 39th Bombardment Wing: 1 February 1963 – 25 June 1965

Eglin Air Force Base, Florida

- 68th Bombardment Wing: 15 April 1963 – 1 July 1964; 1 July 1965 – 2 September 1966

Seymour Johnson Air Force Base, North Carolina

- 465th Bombardment Wing: 1 February 1963 – 2 September 1966 (attached to 57th Air Division after 10 August 1966)

Robins Air Force Base, Georgia

- 484th Bombardment Wing: 1 February 1963 – 2 September 1966
- 4135th Strategic Wing, 1 January 1959 – 1 February 1963
- Eglin Air Force Base, Florida
- 4137th Strategic Wing: 1 July 1959 – 1 February 1963

Robins Air Force Base, Georgia

- 4241st Strategic Wing: 1 January 1959 – 15 April 1963

Seymour Johnson Air Force Base, North Carolina

- 4138 Strategic Wing: 1 January 1959 – 1 February 1963

=== Aircraft and missiles ===
- Boeing B-52 Stratofortress, 1959–1966
- Boeing KC-135 Stratotanker, 1959–1964, 1965–1966
- North American GAM-77 (later AGM-28) Hound Dog, 1960–1966
- GAM-72 Quail (later ADM-22), c. 1962–1966

=== Commanders ===
- Col William E. Ruark Jr., 1 January 1959
- Brig Gen Austin J. Russell, 7 January 1959
- Brig Gen Jack J. Catton, 10 July 1961
- Brig Gen Woodrow P. Swancutt, 30 June 1962 – unknown

== See also ==
- List of United States Air Force air divisions
- List of USAF Bomb Wings and Wings assigned to Strategic Air Command
- List of USAF Strategic Wings assigned to the Strategic Air Command
- List of B-52 Units of the United States Air Force

== Bibliography ==
- Kipp, Robert; Peake, Lynn; Wolk, Herman. "Strategic Air Command Operations in the Cuban Crisis of 1962, SAC Historical Study No. 90 (Top Secret NOFORN, FRD, redacted and declassified)" (PDF). Strategic Air Command.
- Knaack, Marcelle Size (1988). Encyclopedia of US Air Force Aircraft and Missile Systems. Vol. 2, Post-World War II Bombers 1945–1973. Washington, DC: Office of Air Force History. ISBN 0-912799-59-5.
- Mueller, Robert (1989). Air Force Bases, Vol. I, Active Air Force Bases Within the United States of America on 17 September 1982 (PDF). Washington, DC: Office of Air Force History. ISBN 0-912799-53-6.
- Ravenstein, Charles A. (1984). Air Force Combat Wings, Lineage & Honors Histories 1947–1977. Washington, DC: Office of Air Force History. ISBN 0-912799-12-9.
- Ravenstein, Charles A. (1984). A Guide to Air Force Lineage and Honors (2d, Revised ed.). Maxwell AFB, AL: USAF Historical Research Center.
