= 39th Air Base Wing =

United States Air Force unit

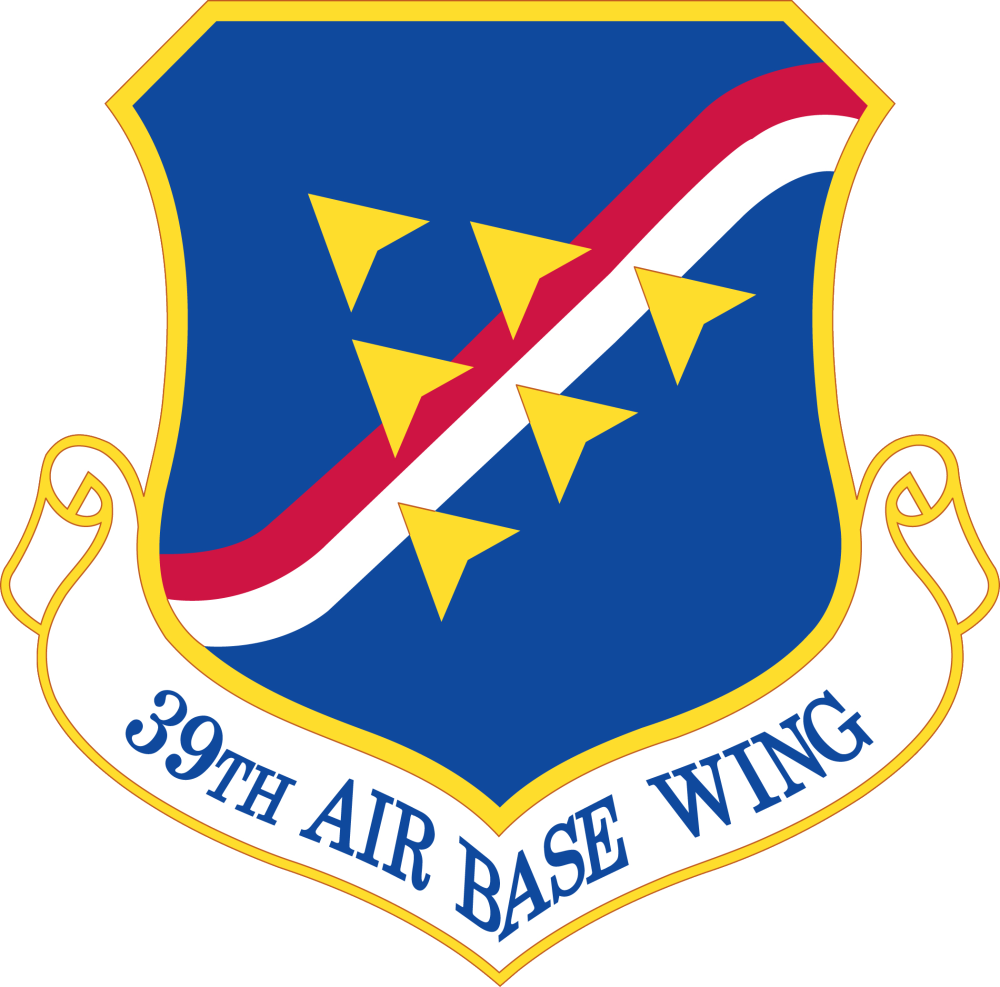
- Wing emblem
- Active: 1941–1945; 1963–1965; 1966 – present
- Country: United States
- Branch: United States Air Force
- Type: Air base wing
- Role: Installation management
- Part of: US Air Forces in Europe – Air Forces Africa (Third Air Force)
- Base: Incirlik Air Base, Turkey
- Motto: Larger than life
- Mascot: Titans
- Website: Official website

Commanders
- Current commander: Colonel Albert M. Esposito

The 39th Air Base Wing (39 ABW) is a United States Air Force unit assigned to the Third Air Force. It is stationed at Incirlik Air Base, Turkey. The wing is also the host unit at Incirlik.

The mission of the 39 ABW is to support and protect NATO assets and people throughout Turkey while providing a full spectrum of capabilities to the warfighter. A non-flying unit, the 39 ABW also supports three geographically separated units.

The wing's heraldic predecessor was the 39th Bombardment Group (39th BG), established in 1941, which became part of Twentieth Air Force. The 39th Bomb Group's flew very heavy bombardment B-29 Superfortress sorties against Japan. Its aircraft were identified by a solid black square painted on the tail with a "P" inside. From 1963 to 1965, the 39th Bombardment Wing flew nuclear-armed bombers as part of Strategic Air Command.

== Mission ==
The wing has no permanently assigned aircraft, it provides facilities and supports the following areas:

- Training deployments and regional exercises—besides its real-world operational support, Incirlik offers many training facilities. These facilities complement the area's cooperative weather, sparsely populated terrain and uncongested airspace. Pilots fly training sorties, including air-to-air, air-to-ground and low-altitude operations.
- Communications for National Command Authority taskings—Incirlik is a key communications link in the southern region.
- Hub support for various units—Incirlik provides vital support for numerous tenant and three geographically separated units located throughout Turkey. Key support includes medical services, supply, security and force protection, base infrastructure maintenance, communications support, transportation services, airlift, services and personnel support.

For US personnel stationed in other Turkish locations and surrounding countries, the 39th ABW acts as a hub of support. Key areas include supply, base infrastructure maintenance, security, medical services, airlift, and other services.

The wing provided transit support to a variety of transport aircraft flying supplies and troops to the War in Iraq and the War in Afghanistan (2001-2021).

The 425th Air Base Squadron provides mission and administrative agent support to US personnel assigned to NATO HQ Allied Land Command Izmir and associate units, and administer the Çiğli Air Base Turnover Agreement.

The 717th Air Base Squadron operates the Ankara Support Facility providing support to the entire American community in the Ankara area, including the diverse military community and the U.S. Embassy in Ankara.

In 2016, the 39th ABW adopted the Titans from Greek mythology as its mascot alongside the motto 'larger than life'.

== Component units ==
As of December 2025, the 39th Air Base Wing comprises the following units. Unless otherwise indicated, units are based at Incirlik Air Base, Turkey.

- Headquarters, 39th Air Base Wing
  - 39th Comptroller Squadron
  - 39th Medical Group
    - 39th Medical Operations Squadron
    - 39th Medical Support Squadron
  - 39th Mission Support Group
    - 39th Civil Engineer Squadron
    - 39th Communications Squadron
    - 39th Contracting Squadron
    - 39th Force Support Squadron
    - 39th Logistics Readiness Squadron
    - 425th Air Base Squadron (Izmir Air Station, Turkey)
    - 717th Air Base Squadron (Ankara Support Facility, Turkey)
  - 39th Weapons System Security Group
    - 39th Maintenance Squadron
    - 39th Operations Support Squadron
    - 39th Security Forces Squadron

== History ==
=== World War II ===
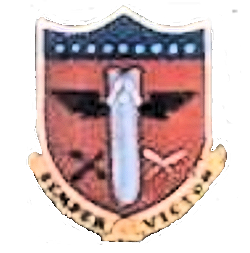
Emblem of the 39th Bombardment Group

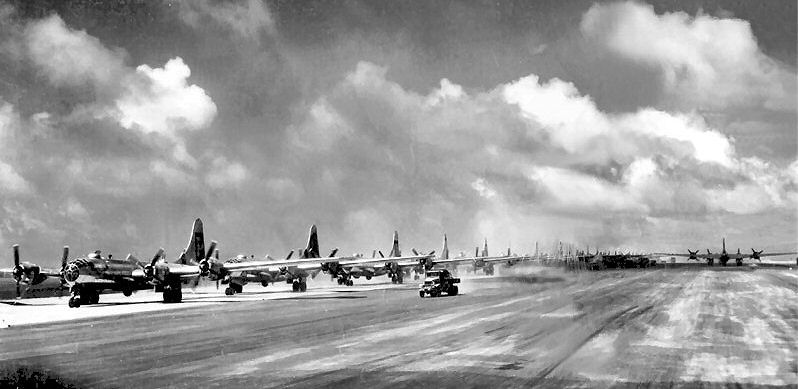
39th BG B-29s at North Field Guam – Summer 1945

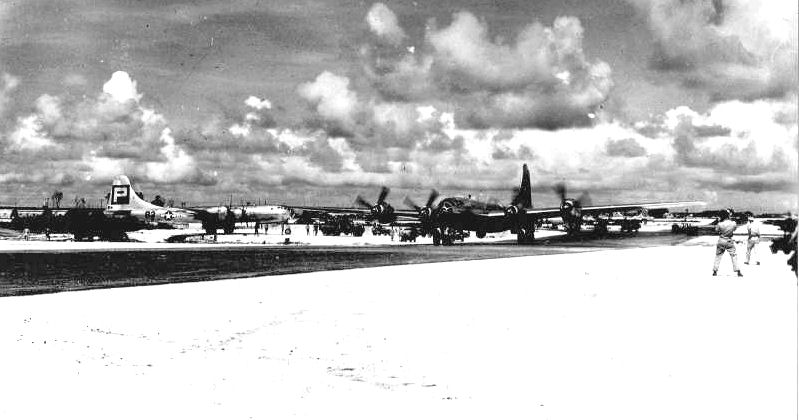
39th Bombardment Group B-29s

Established as the 39th Bombardment Group as a pre-World War II B-17 Flying Fortress bomb group, activated at Fort Douglas, Utah in January 1941. After training, was assigned to Gieger Field, Washington as part of the Army Air Corps Northwest Air District in July. After the Pearl Harbor Attack, the group initially flew antisubmarine patrols along the Northwest Pacific Coastline.

Reassigned to II Bomber Command at Davis–Monthan Field, Arizona in February 1942 where the group became a B-17 Operational Training (OTU) unit for newly formed heavy bomb groups; later a Replacement Training Unit (RTU) for replacement bomber crew members. Inactivated on 1 April 1944 with the end of heavy bomber training.

Reactivated the same day at Smoky Hill Army Airfield, Kansas as a Very Heavy B-29 Superfortress bomb group, it began training under Second Air Force for deployment to the Asiatic-Pacific Theater. During April and the early part of May 1944, personnel was being assigned to the new Group in small numbers, but no aircraft were yet available. Four squadrons, the 60th, 61st, 62d and 402d were assigned to the group. On 10 May the 402d was inactivated due to personnel shortages, with its assets redistributed to other squadrons in the group. On 15 May the group was reassigned to Dalhart Army Airfield, Texas where the ground echelon was formed, and the operational squadrons trained with old II Bomber Command B-17s. In August, the unit returned to Smoky Hill where limited B-29 training was begun while waiting for the 499th Bomb Group to complete training and deploy to the Pacific.

Full-time training was finally initiated in October 1944 and ground school instruction began for all men of the unit. In January 1945, the air echelon deployed to Batista Army Airfield, Cuba for flying and bombing training. The ground echelon departed on 8 January for Seattle, where it embarked on the S. S. Howell Lykes for North Field, Guam. In the meantime, the air echelon had returned from Cuba and the Group was in the last stages of preparation for the ferrying of personnel and the new operational B-29s received from Boeing-Wichita.

The unit formed at North Field, Guam in mid-February 1945. On 18 February, the group was assigned to its permanent unit, the 314th Bomb Wing, which had just arrived from Colorado. Upon arrival the group's personnel were engaged in Quonset hut construction. By mid-March most personnel were able to move into the huts from the initial tents which they were assigned on arrival

The group conducted its first mission against the Japanese home islands in April 1945. Supported Allied invasion of Okinawa by attacking airfields that served as bases for kamikaze pilots. Bombed military and industrial targets in Japan and participated in incendiary raids on urban areas from mid-May until the end of the war.

The 39th Bomb Group received a Distinguished Unit Citation for an attack against the Otake oil refinery and storage area on Honshū on 10 May 1945. Received a second Distinguished Unit Citation for bombing industrial and dock areas in Yokohama and manufacturing districts in Tokyo, 23–29 May 1945.

The group returned to the United States in November–December 1945 for inactivation. Actor and Hollywood star Charles Bronson served as an aerial gunner on a B-29 Superfortress in the 39th Bombardment Group in 1945. He was awarded a Purple Heart for wounds received during his combat missions against the Japanese home islands.

=== Strategic Air Command ===
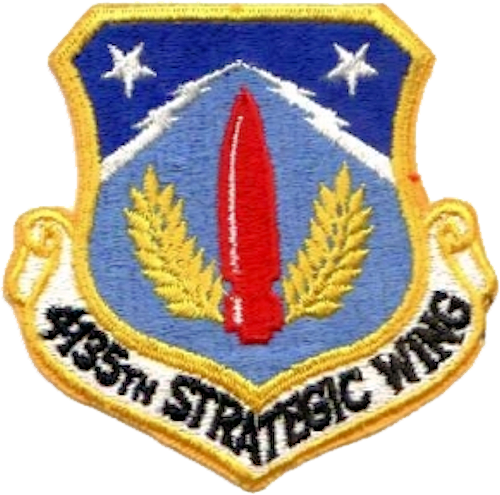
4135th Strategic Wing Patch

4135th Strategic Wing

The origins of the 39th Bombardment Wing began on 1 December 1958 when Strategic Air Command established the 4135th Strategic Wing at Eglin Air Force Base, Florida and assigned it to Second Air Force as part of SAC's plan to disperse its Boeing B-52 Stratofortress heavy bombers over a larger number of bases, thus making it more difficult for the Soviet Union to knock out the entire fleet with a surprise first strike. On 1 January 1959 the wing was reassigned to the 822d Air Division. The wing remained a headquarters only until 1 April 1959 when three maintenance squadrons and a squadron to provide security of the wing's special weapons were activated and assigned to the wing. It became fully organized in July, when the 301st Bombardment Squadron (BS), consisting of 15 Boeing B-52 Stratofortresses moved to Eglin from Ramey AFB, Puerto Rico where it had been one of the three squadrons of the 72d Bombardment Wing and the 54th Aviation Depot Squadron was activated to oversee the wing's special weapons. Starting in 1960, one third of the squadron's aircraft were maintained on fifteen-minute alert, fully fueled and ready for combat to reduce vulnerability to a Soviet missile strike. This was increased to half the squadron's aircraft in 1962. The 4135th (and later the 39th) continued to maintain an alert commitment until inactivated. In addition, the wing conduct final testing of the GAM-77 Hound Dog and the GAM-72 Quail air-launched cruise missiles from its B-52s as part of the testing program carried out by the Armament Division of Air Force Systems Command. The first launch of a Hound Dog by SAC was made by a wing crew on 29 February 1960 and the first Quail launch a few months later, on 8 June. In 1962 the 4135th Airborne Missile Maintenance Squadron was activated in November 1962 to maintain these missiles.

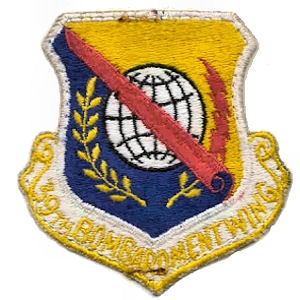
39th Bombardment Wing Patch

39th Bombardment Wing

However, SAC Strategic Wings could not carry a permanent history or lineage and SAC looked for a way to make its Strategic Wings permanent. In 1962, in order to perpetuate the lineage of many currently inactive bombardment units with illustrious World War II records, Headquarters SAC received authority from Headquarters USAF to discontinue its Major Command controlled (MAJCON) strategic wings that were equipped with combat aircraft and to activate Air Force controlled (AFCON) units, most of which were inactive at the time which could carry a lineage and history. As a result, the 4135th SW was replaced by the newly constituted 39th Bombardment Wing, Heavy (39th BW), which assumed its mission, personnel, and equipment on 1 February 1963. In the same way the 62d Bombardment Squadron, one of the unit's World War II historical bomb squadrons, replaced the 301st BS. The 54th Munitions Maintenance Squadron was also reassigned to the 39th. The 4135th's component maintenance and security units were replaced by units with the 39th designation of the newly established wing. Under the Dual Deputate organization, all flying and maintenance squadrons were directly assigned to the wing, so no operational group element was activated. Each of the new units assumed the personnel, equipment, and mission of its predecessor.

The 39th BW trained to maintain combat readiness for strategic bombardment on global scale, maintaining airborne alert, ground alert, and participated in numerous exercises. On 25 June 1965 The growing United States commitment to the Vietnam War meant funds were also needed to cover the costs of combat operations in Indochina and the 39th Bombardment Wing was inactivated on 25 June 1965. The wing's 62d BS was reassigned to the 2d Bombardment Wing at Barksdale AFB, Louisiana to support SAC Arc Light combat operations over Southeast Asia but its other components were discontinued. SAC's place at Eglin was taken by Tactical Air Command, which organized the 33d Tactical Fighter Wing, which took over the SAC facilities at the base.

=== United States Air Forces in Europe ===
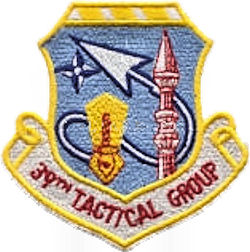
39th Tactical Group Patch (1966–1993)

The 39th Bombardment Group was redesignated 39th Tactical Group and activated on 1 April 1966 at Incirlik Air Base, Turkey, and replaced the 7216th Combat Support Group to control permanent support units and deployed weapons training detachments. The redesignation was part of the USAFE takeover of the base and its support functions. Known as The United States Logistics Group (TUSLOG) Detachment 10 within Turkey until 1 October 1982, it supported the USAFE and NATO operational missions in the Middle East. It provided disaster relief and mercy missions as required during fires, floods, earthquakes, and other such disasters. The group provided support for US and NATO forces during operations in Southwest Asia, Eastern Europe, and Iraq, August 1990–present.

On 31 January 1984, the group was consolidated with the 39th Bombardment Wing. The consolidated unit retained the designation of 39th Tactical Group. It was attached to the 7440th Composite Wing (Provisional) during the Gulf War of 1991. It was then redesignated the 39th Wing and resumed wing status on 1 October 1993. Since then the unit has provided operational and logistical support for all U.S. forces in Turkey and operated a Supreme Allied Command Europe Quick Reaction Alert Force.

From September 1997 – May 2003, the wing became the major force provider for the provisional 39th Air and Space Expeditionary Wing, which supported Operation Northern Watch, Operation Enduring Freedom and Operation Iraqi Freedom.

The wing's subordinate 39th Expeditionary Operations Group received the newly activated 414th Expeditionary Reconnaissance Squadron upon its activation on 15 October 2011.

== Lineage ==
39th Air Base Wing

- Constituted as 39th Bombardment Group (Heavy) on 20 November 1940

Activated on 15 January 1941
Redesignated 39th Bombardment Group, Very Heavy on 28 March 1944
Inactivated on 1 April 1944
Activated on 1 April 1944
Inactivated on 27 December 1945.
Redesignated 39th Tactical Group, and activated, on 14 March 1966 (not organized)

- Organized on 1 April 1966

Consolidated with 39th Bombardment Wing, Heavy, on 31 January 1984
Redesignated 39th Wing on 1 October 1993
Redesignated 39th Air Base Group on 6 July 2003.
Redesignated 39th Air Base Wing on 12 March 2004

39th Bombardment Wing

- Constituted as 39th Bombardment Wing, Heavy on 15 November 1962 and activated (not organized)

Organized on 1 February 1963
Discontinued and inactivated on 25 June 1965
Consolidated with 39th Tactical Group as 39th Tactical Group on 31 January 1984

=== Assignments ===
- 5th Bombardment Wing, 15 January 1941
- II Bomber Command, 5 September 1941
- 16th Bombardment Operational Training Wing, 4 September 1943 – 1 April 1944
- XXI Bomber Command, 1 April 1944

Attached to 17th Bombardment Operational Training Wing, c. 15 April 1944 – 8 January 1945

- 314th Bombardment Wing, Very Heavy, c. 18 February-27 December 1945
- Strategic Air Command, 15 November 1962
- 822d Air Division, 1 February 1963 – 25 June 1965
- United States Air Forces in Europe, 14 March 1966
- 7217th Air Division (Command), 1 April 1966
- Sixteenth Air Force, 9 September 1970
- The United States Logistics Group (TUSLOG), 15 October 1971

Attached to 7440th Composite Wing (Provisional), 16 January 1991 – 30 November 1995

- Sixteenth Air Force, 17 July 1992
- United States Air Forces in Europe, 1 November 2005
- Air Command Europe, 18 November 2005
- Third Air Force (Air Forces Europe), 1 December 2006–present

=== Stations ===
- Fort Douglas, Utah, 15 January 1941
- Geiger Field, Washington, 2 July 1941
- Davis–Monthan Field, Arizona, 5 February 1942 – 1 April 1944
- Smoky Hill Army Air Field, Kansas, 1 April 1944 – 8 January 1945
- North Field, Guam, Mariana Islands, 18 February – 17 November 1945
- Camp Anza, California, 15 – 27 December 1945
- Eglin Air Force Base, Florida, 1 February 1963 – 25 June 1965
- Incirlik Air Base, Turkey, 1 April 1966 –

=== Operational Units ===
==== World War II ====
- 60th Bombardment Squadron (VH): 15 January 1941 – 1 April 1944; 1 April 1944 – 27 December 1945.
- 61st Bombardment Squadron: 15 January 1941 – 1 April 1944; 1 April 1944 – 27 December 1945.
- 62d Bombardment Squadron: 15 January 1941 – 1 April 1944; 1 April 1944 – 27 December 1945; 1 February 1963 – 25 June 1965.
- 27th Photographic Laboratory Section: c. 1 April 1944 – c. 27 December 1945
- 12th Reconnaissance (later, 402d Bombardment) Squadron: attached 15 January 1941 – 24 February 1942, assigned 25 February 1942 – 1 April 1944; assigned 1 Apr-10 May 1944.

==== post World War II ====
- 39th Operations Group: 1 October 1993 – 16 July 2003

39th Operations Squadron: 16 July 2003 –
414th Expeditionary Reconnaissance Squadron, October 2011 - unknown

=== Aircraft ===
- B-17 Flying Fortress, 1941–1942
- B-25 Mitchell, 1941
- B-24 Liberator, 1942–1944
- B-29 Superfortress, 1944–1945
- B-52 Stratofortress, 1963–1965
- Controlled deployed aircraft, 1966–1997

== See also ==
- B-17 Flying Fortress units of the United States Army Air Forces
- List of B-29 Superfortress operators
- List of B-52 Units of the United States Air Force
- List of wings of the United States Air Force

== Notes ==
=== Bibliography ===
- Knaack, Marcelle Size (1988). Encyclopedia of US Air Force Aircraft and Missile Systems (PDF). Vol. 2, Post-World War II Bombers 1945–1973. Washington, DC: Office of Air Force History. ISBN 0-912799-59-5.
- Mueller, Robert (1989). Air Force Bases, Vol. I, Active Air Force Bases Within the United States of America on 17 September 1982 (PDF). Washington, DC: Office of Air Force History. ISBN 0-912799-53-6.
- Ravenstein, Charles A. (1984). Air Force Combat Wings, Lineage & Honors Histories 1947–1977. Washington, DC: Office of Air Force History. ISBN 0-912799-12-9.
- Ravenstein, Charles A. (1984). A Guide to Air Force Lineage and Honors (2d, Revised ed.). Maxwell AFB, AL: USAF Historical Research Center.
