= 465th Bombardment Wing =

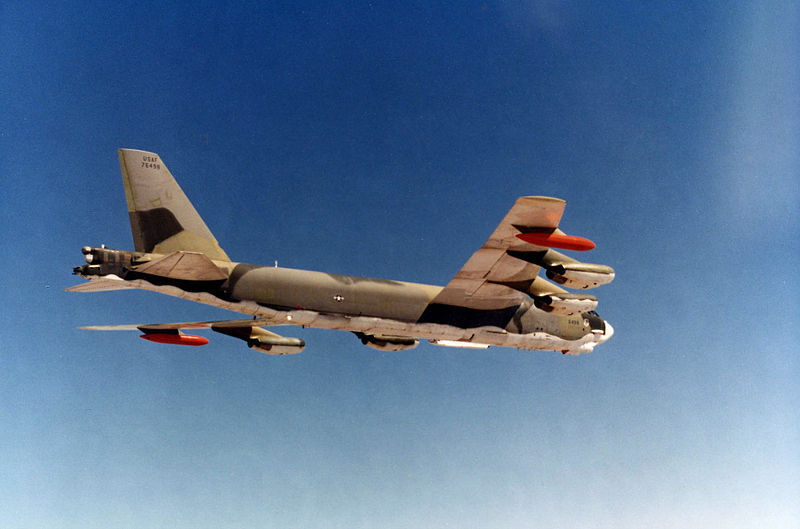
- B-52G Stratofortress (Note: Aircraft is Boeing B-52G-75-BW Stratofortress, serial 57-6475.) over the skies of Vietnam, 1968
- Active: 1953–1957; 1962–1968
- Country: United States
- Branch: United States Air Force
- Role: Heavybomber
- Motto: Checkmate to Aggression

Insignia
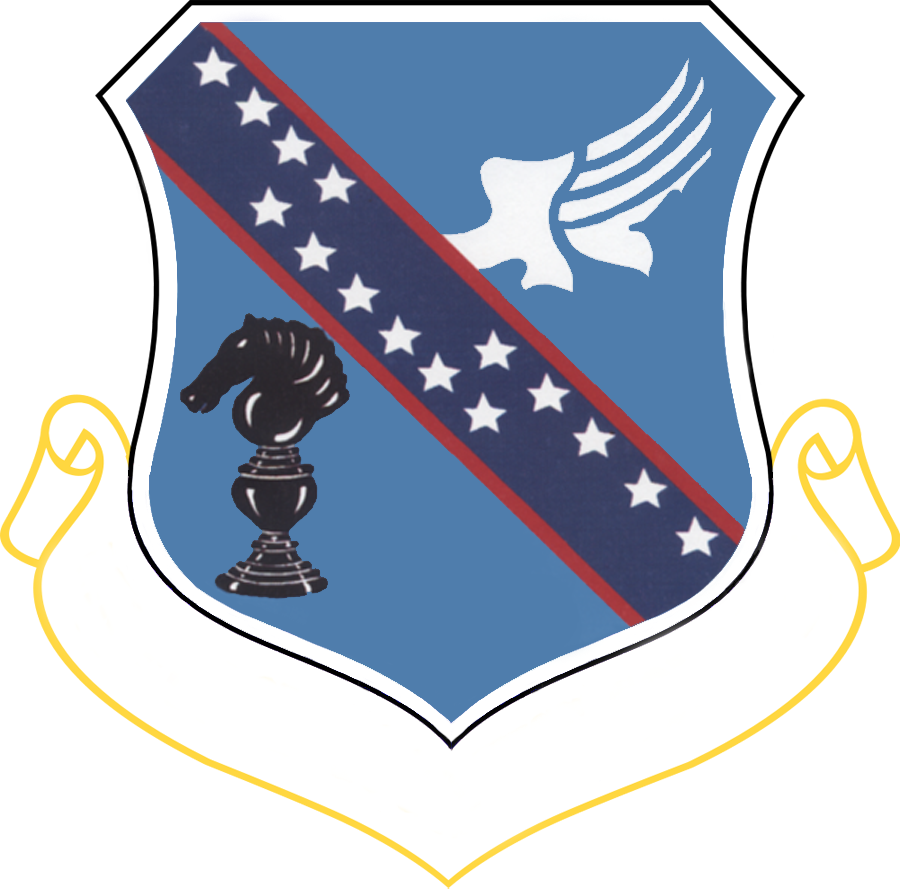
- 465th Bombardment Wing emblem (Note: Approved 24 March 1964.)

The 465th Bombardment Wing is an inactive United States Air Force unit. It was last assigned to the 57th Air Division of Strategic Air Command at Robins Air Force Base, Georgia, where it was inactivated on 21 July 1968.

Originally activated in 1953 as the 465th Troop Carrier Wing, it moved to Europe where it served as a theater airlift unit until 1957.

In November 1962 the wing was designated the 465th Strategic Bombardment Wing and was stationed at Robins as a Boeing B-52 Stratofortress Strategic Air Command heavy bomber wing. The wing conducted strategic bombardment training and air refueling operations until being inactivated in July 1968 when SAC transferred the 19th Bombardment Wing to Robins and it assumed the 465th's mission, personnel and equipment.

== History ==
=== World War II ===
The 465th Bombardment Group served as a Consolidated B-24 Liberator heavy bomb group in the Mediterranean Theater of Operations during World War II. It earned two Distinguished Unit Citations in 1944. The 456th wing is entitled to the group's history and these awards through temporary bestowal.

=== United States Air Forces in Europe ===
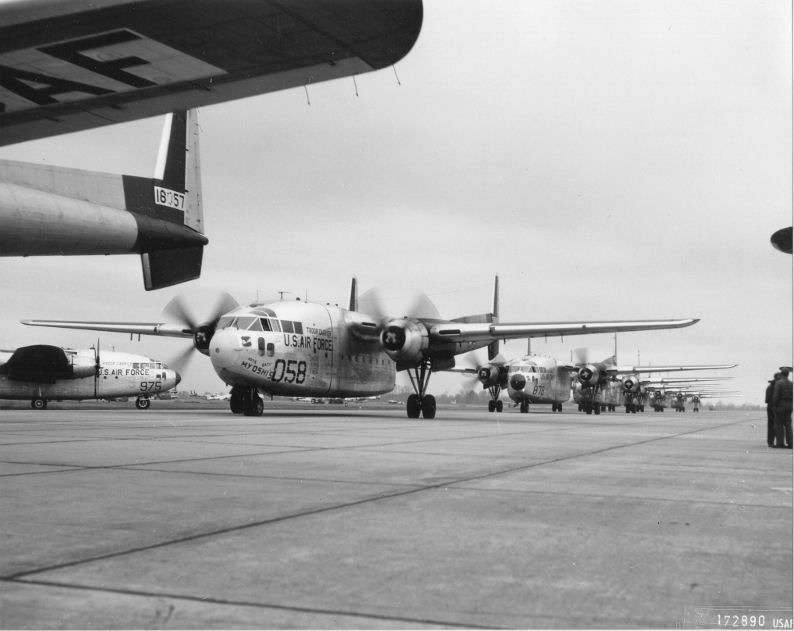
465th Troop Carrier Group Fairchild C-119G Flying Boxcars taxiing at Évreux-Fauville Air Base, France, 1956

The unit was originally activated at Mitchel Air Force Base, New York as the 465th Troop Carrier Wing, Medium on 21 August 1953. Upon activation, the wing was assigned the 465th Troop Carrier Group as its operational element. However, the 465th group was located at Donaldson Air Force Base, South Carolina, and the wing controlled flying units assigned to the 313th Troop Carrier Group, which was attached to the wing at Mitchel until late September, when it moved to Sewart Air Force Base, Tennessee.

The loss of the 313th group and the reassignment of the 465th group in December left the wing without an operational element until it moved to Toul-Rosières Air Base, France in April 1954, where it was assigned to the 322d Air Division of United States Air Forces in Europe (USAFE) and reunited with the 465th group. The group was made non-operational in December 1956 and its operational squadrons were attached to the Wing.

In Europe, the Wing participated in numerous troop carrier and airlift operation's, tests, and exercises in the European area in support of USAFE and the North Atlantic Treaty Organization. In March 1957 At Toul three Lockheed C-130A Hercules squadrons, the 39th, 40th and 41st Troop Carrier Squadrons, were assigned to the wing as USAFE prepared to turn Neubiberg Air Base, Germany over to the German Air Force.

In July 1957 the wing was inactivated and its squadrons were assigned to the 317th Troop Carrier Wing, which assumed its mission, personnel and equipment after moving to France from Neubiberg.

=== Strategic Air Command ===
4137th Strategic Wing

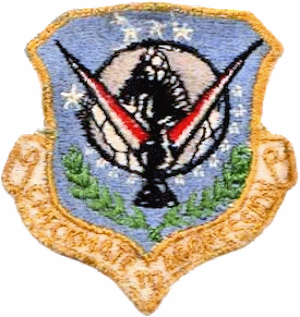
Patch with 4137th Strategic Wing emblem

On 1 February 1959, Strategic Air Command (SAC) established the 4137th Strategic Wing at Robins Air Force Base, Georgia and assigned it to the 822d Air Division as part of SAC's plan to disperse its Boeing B-52 Stratofortress heavy bombers over a larger number of bases, thus making it more difficult for the Soviet Union to knock out the entire fleet with a surprise first strike. The wing remained a headquarters only until 1 January 1960 when the 64th Aviation Depot Squadron was activated to oversee the wing's special weapons. At the beginning of May the 342d Bombardment Squadron (BS), consisting of 15 Boeing B-52G Stratofortresses moved to Robins from Blytheville Air Force Base, Arkansas where it had been one of the three squadrons of the 97th Bombardment Wing and three maintenance squadrons and a squadron to provide security for special weapons were activated and assigned to the wing.

Two additional squadrons rounded out the wing. In December 1961 the 912th Air Refueling Squadron, flying Boeing KC-135 Stratotankers was activated and assigned to the wing and in November 1962 the 4137th Airborne Missile Maintenance Squadron stood up to maintain the wing's GAM-77 Hound Dog and GAM-72 Quail missiles. One third of the wing's aircraft were maintained on fifteen-minute alert, fully fueled and ready for combat to reduce vulnerability to a Soviet missile strike. This was increased to half the wing's aircraft in 1962. The 4137th (and later the 465th) continued to maintain an alert commitment until inactivation. However, SAC Strategic Wings could not carry a permanent history or lineage and SAC looked for a way to make its Strategic Wings permanent.

465th Bombardment Wing In 1962, in order to perpetuate the lineage of many currently inactive bombardment units with illustrious World War II records, Headquarters SAC received authority from Headquarters USAF to discontinue its Major Command controlled (MAJCON) strategic wings that were equipped with combat aircraft and to activate Air Force controlled (AFCON) units, most of which were inactive at the time which could carry a lineage and history. (Note: MAJCON units could not carry a permanent history or lineage. Ravenstein, Charles A. (1984). A Guide to Air Force Lineage and Honors (2d, Revised ed.). Maxwell AFB, AL: USAF Historical Research Center. p. 12..)

As a result, the 4137th was replaced by the 465 Bombardment Wing, Heavy, which assumed its mission, personnel, and equipment on 1 February 1963. (Note: The 465th continued, through temporary bestowal, the history, and honors of the World War II 465th Bombardment Group. It was also entitled to retain the honors (but not the history or lineage) of the 4137th. This temporary bestowal ended when the wing was inactivated.) In the same way the 781st Bombardment Squadron, one of the unit's World War II historical bomb squadrons, replaced the 342d BS. The 64th Munitions Maintenance Squadron and the 912th Air Refueling Squadron were reassigned to the 465th. Component support units were replaced by units with numerical designation of the newly established wing. Under the Dual Deputate organization, all flying and maintenance squadrons were directly assigned to the wing, so no operational group element was activated. Each of the new units assumed the personnel, equipment, and mission of its predecessor.

The 465th Bomb Wing continued to conduct strategic bombardment training and air refueling operations to meet operational commitments of Strategic Air Command, including deployments to Southeast Asia during the Vietnam War. By 1968, Intercontinental ballistic missiles had been deployed and become operational as part of the United States' strategic triad, and the need for B-52s had been reduced. In addition, funds were also needed to cover the costs of combat operations in Indochina. The 465th Bombardment Wing was inactivated on 25 July 1968 and B-52Gs were transferred to the 28th Bombardment Squadron, 19th Bombardment Wing when the 19th moved to Robins from Homestead Air Force Base, Florida in a designation-only move.

== Lineage ==
- Constituted as 465th Troop Carrier Wing, Medium on 21 August 1953

Activated on 25 August 1953
Inactivated on 8 July 1957

- Redesignated 465th Bombardment Wing, Heavy on 15 November 1962 and activated

Organized on 1 February 1963
Discontinued and inactivated, on 25 July 1968.

=== Assignments ===
- Eighteenth Air Force, 25 August 1953
- Twelfth Air Force, 1 April 1954 (attached to: 322d Air Division (Combat Cargo) until 31 July 1955)
- 322d Air Division (Combat Cargo), 1 August 1955 – 8 July 1957
- Strategic Air Command, 15 November 1962 (not organized)
- 822d Air Division, 1 February 1963 (attached to 57th Air Division, 10 August – 1 September 1966)
- 57th Air Division, 2 September 1966 – 25 July 1968

=== Components ===
Groups

- 313th Troop Carrier Group: attached 25 August 1953 – 30 September 1953
- 465th Troop Carrier Group: 25 August 1953 – 26 December 1953 (attached to 64th Troop Carrier Wing until 30 November 1953, then to the 63d Troop Carrier Wing); 1 April 1954 – 12 March 1957
- 465th Air Base Group: 25 August 1953 – 8 July 1957
- 465th Maintenance and Supply Group: 25 August 1953 – 12 March 1957
- 465th Medical Group (later 465th Tactical Hospital): 25 August 1953 – 8 July 1957

Operational Squadrons

- 39th Troop Carrier Squadron: Attached December 1956 – 11 March 1957, Assigned 12 March – 8 July 1957
- 40th Troop Carrier Squadron: Attached 10 April – 7 July 1957
- 41st Troop Carrier Squadron: Attached 15 March – 7 July 1957
- 780th Troop Carrier Squadron: 1 March 1957 – 8 July 1957
- 781st Troop Carrier Squadron (later 781st Bombardment Squadron): 1 March 1957 – 8 July 1957; 1 February 1963 – 25 July 1968
- 782d Troop Carrier Squadron: 1 March 1957 – 8 July 1957
- 912th Air Refueling Squadron: 1 February 1963 – 25 July 1968

Maintenance Squadrons

- 465th Airborne Missile Maintenance Squadron: 1 February 1963 – 25 July 1968
- 465th Armament and Electronics Maintenance Squadron: 1 February 1963 – 25 July 1968
- 465th Consolidated Aircraft Maintenance Squadron (later 465th Field Maintenance Squadron):12 March 1957 – 8 July 1957, 1 February 1963 – 25 July 1968
- 465th Organizational Maintenance Squadron: 1 February 1963 – 25 July 1968

=== Stations ===
- Mitchel Air Force Base, New York 25 August 1953 – 23 March 1954
- Toul-Rosières Air Base, France, 2 April 1954
- Évreux-Fauville Air Base, France, 23 May 1955 – 8 July 1957
- Robins Air Force Base, Georgia, 1 February 1963 – 25 July 1968.

=== Aircraft flown ===
- Fairchild C-119 Flying Boxcar, 1953, 1954–1957
- Boeing B-52G Stratofortress, 1963–1968
- Boeing KC-135 Stratotanker, 1963–1968.

== See also ==
- List of B-52 Units of the United States Air Force
