= 62nd Bombardment Squadron =

62nd Bomb Squadron (Formerly 62nd Bombardment Squadron)
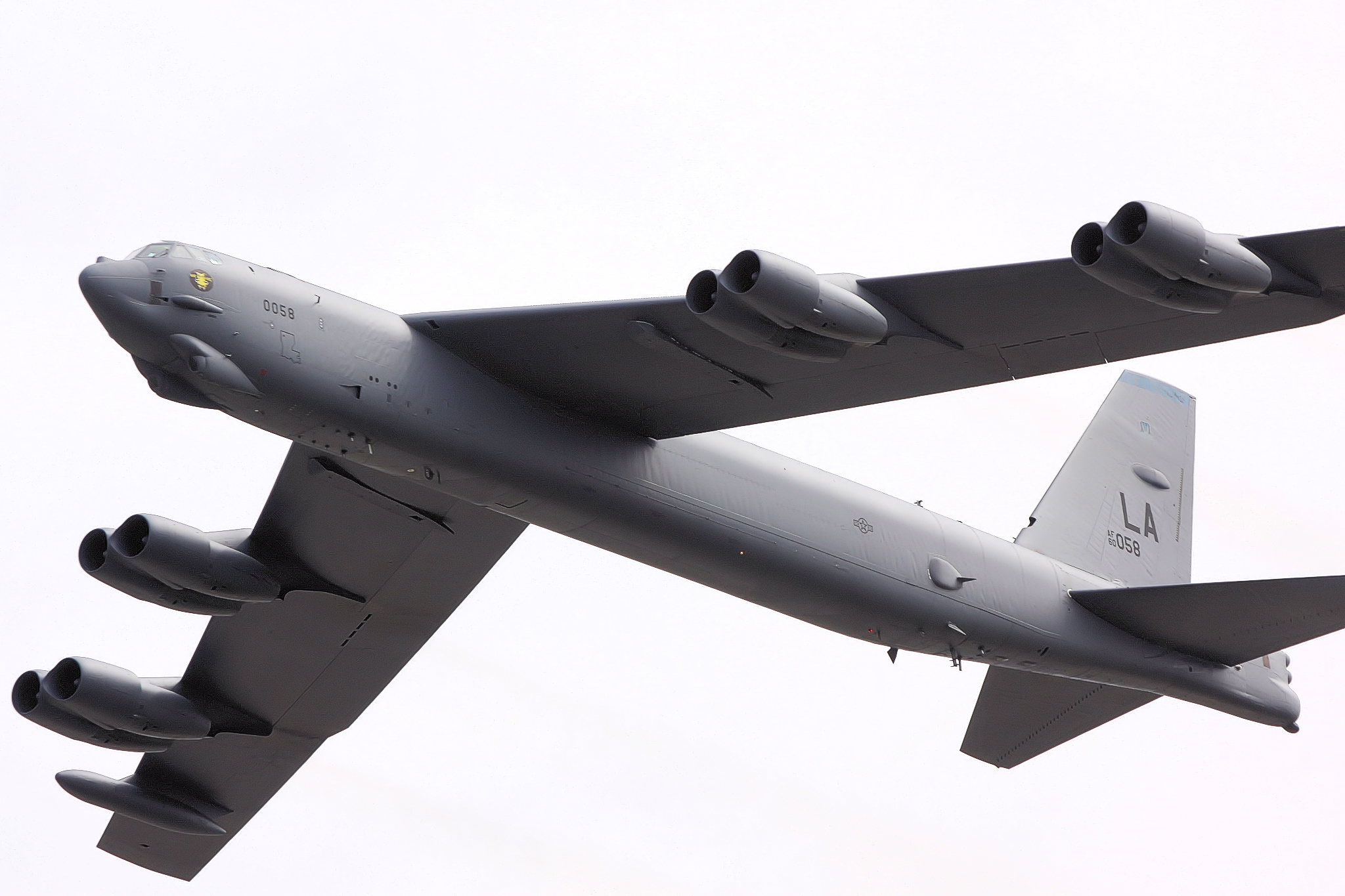
- 2nd Bomb Wing B-52H Stratofortress
- Active: 1941-1944; 1944-1945; 1963-1993
- Country: United States
- Branch: United States Air Force
- Role: Strategic bombardment
- Engagements: Air Offensive, Japan; Western Pacific
- Decorations: Distinguished Unit Citation; Air Force Outstanding Unit Award

Insignia
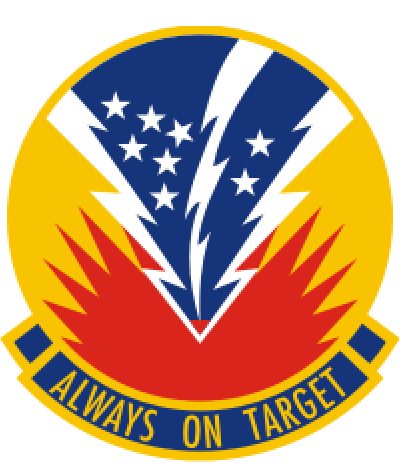
- 62nd Bomb Squadron emblem (Note: The emblem, designed by Maj. John P. Salvucci, was approved for use in August 1967. The emblem bears the national and USAF colors, golden yellow and ultramarine blue. The gold field refers to the excellence required of Air Force personnel. Against the gold field, the blue of the pile depicts the sky, the primary theater of USAF operations. Lightning represents the squadron's swift and accurate striking power. The blue pile and lightning descending upon the red sun denotes the squadron's World War II participation in the air offensive against Japan. The stars allude to the Strategic Air Command banner and their position in the groups of six and two indicate the squadron's numerical designation.)
- 1991-1993 tail marking: LA
- World War II tail marking: Square P

The 62nd Bombardment Squadron is an inactive United States Air Force unit. Its predecessor was activated in January 1941, one of the three original bombardment squadrons of the 39th Bombardment Group. It was then transferred to conducting anti-submarine patrols off Australia, and then became a training unit. After this it was transferred to B-29's and flew missions in Japanese theatre. It was inactivated in 1945, and for the final time reactivated in 1963. It then flew B-52's in a nuclear alert role, and took part in air operations over Vietnam as part of Operation Arc Light. It was last assigned to the 2nd Operations Group at Barksdale Air Force Base, Louisiana on 18 January 1993.

== History ==
=== World War II ===
==== Organization and crew training ====
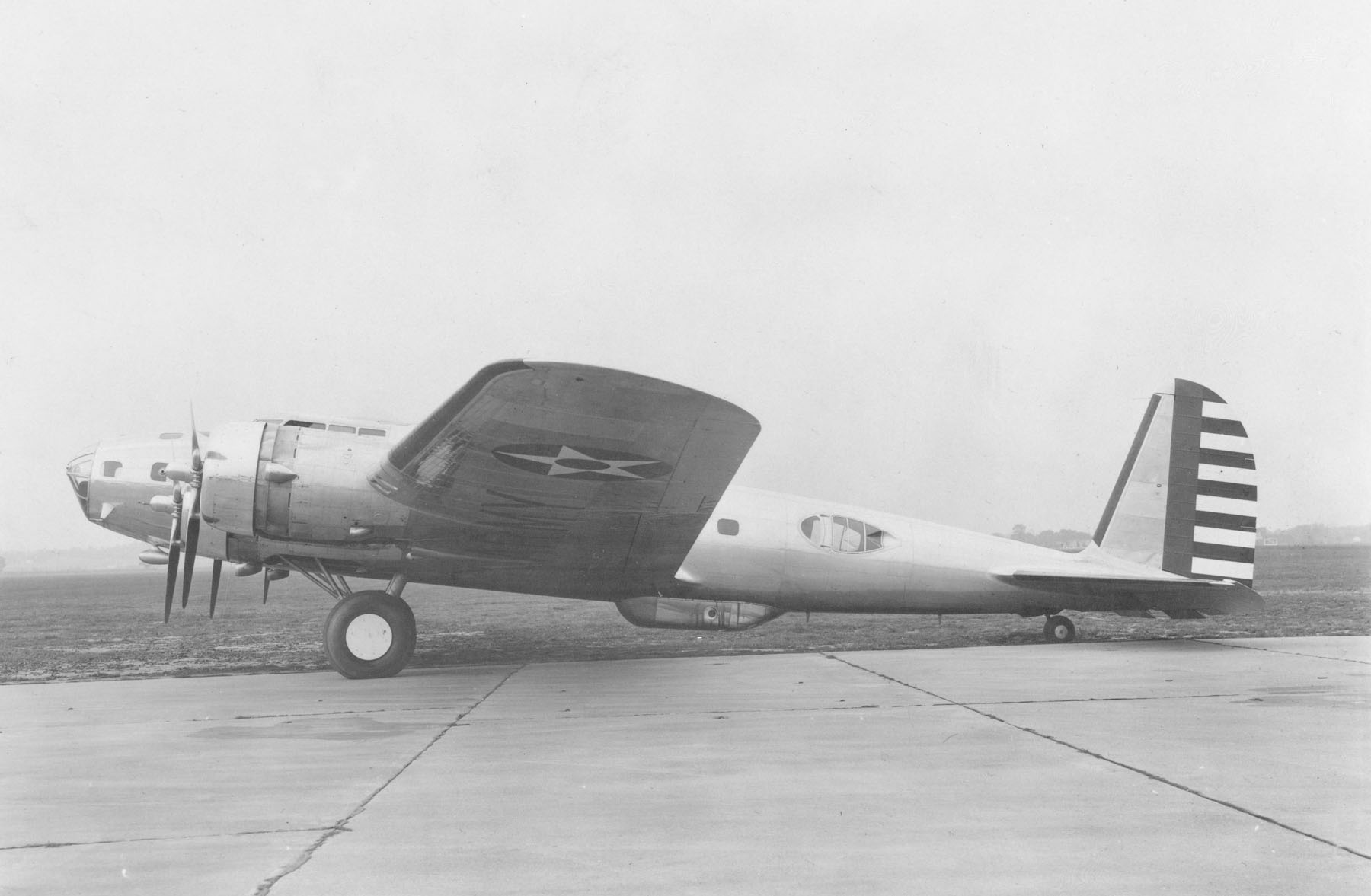
Boeing B-17C

The first predecessor of the squadron was initially activated at Fort Douglas, Utah in January 1941 as the 62nd Bombardment Squadron, one of the three original bombardment squadrons of the 39th Bombardment Group. (Note: The 39th Group also had an attached reconnaissance squadron. This soon became the fourth bombardment squadron of the group. Maurer, Combat Squadrons, pp. 491-492.) The squadron flew Boeing B-17 Flying Fortresses. While stationed at Fort Douglas, the squadron conducted flight operations from Salt Lake City Municipal Airport. In July 1941, the squadron moved with the 39th Group to Geiger Field, Washington. Its aircraft and crews were sent to Australia in early 1942, they were assigned to Fifth Air Force units being formed there after the withdrawal of B-17s from Clark Field in January 1942 after operations from Clark became untenable during the 1942 Battle of the Philippines.

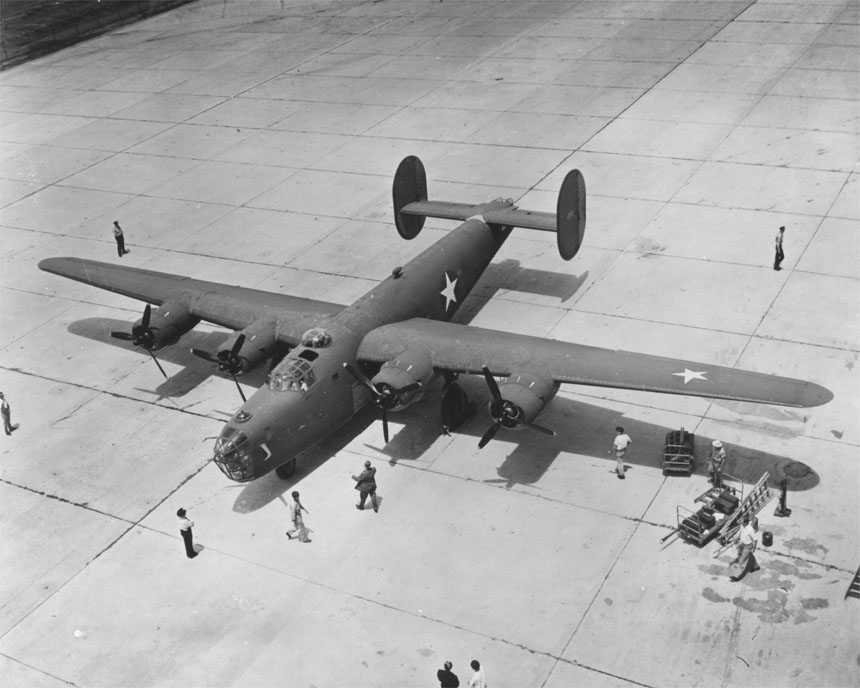
Consolidated B-24E

Following the Attack on Pearl Harbor, the squadron flew anti-submarine patrols off the Pacific Coast until February 1942, when it moved to Davis-Monthan Field, Arizona. At Davis-Monthan, it converted to Consolidated B-24 Liberators. With its Liberators, the squadron became an Operational Training Unit (OTU). The OTU program involved the use of an oversized parent unit to provide cadres to "satellite groups" It then assumed responsibility for their training and oversaw their expansion with graduates of Army Air Forces Training Command schools to become effective combat units. The OTU program was patterned after the unit training system of the Royal Air Force. Phase I training concentrated on individual training in crewmember specialties. Phase II training emphasized the coordination for the crew to act as a team. The final phase concentrated on operation as a unit.

By late 1943 most of the Army Air Forces (AAF)'s units had been activated and almost three quarters of them had deployed overseas. With the exception of special programs, like forming Boeing B-29 Superfortress units, training “fillers” for existing units became more important than unit training. The squadron mission changed to that of a Replacement Training Unit (RTU). The RTU was also an oversized unit, but its mission was to train individual pilots or aircrews.

However, the AAF was finding that standard military units like the 62nd, whose manning was based on relatively inflexible tables of organization were proving not well adapted to the training mission, even more so to the replacement mission. Accordingly, the Army Air Forces adopted a more functional system in which each base was organized into a separate numbered unit. Most of the OTUs and RTUs were inactivated or disbanded and training activities given to these base units. The 39th Group and its components were inactivated on 1 April 1944, and along with supporting units at Davis-Monthan, replaced by the 233rd AAF Base Unit (Combat Crew Training School, Bombardment, Heavy).

==== B-29 Superfortress operations against Japan ====
The squadron was reactivated the same day as a Boeing B-29 Superfortress very heavy bombardment squadron. When training was completed moved to North Field Guam in the Mariana Islands of the Central Pacific Area in January 1945 and assigned to XXI Bomber Command, Twentieth Air Force. Its mission was the strategic bombardment of the Japanese Home Islands and the destruction of its war-making capability.

Flew "shakedown" missions against Japanese targets on Moen Island, Truk, and other points in the Carolines and Marianas. The squadron began combat missions over Japan on 25 February 1945 with a firebombing mission over Northeast Tokyo. The squadron continued to participate in wide area firebombing attack, but the first ten-day blitz resulting in the Army Air Forces running out of incendiary bombs. Until then the squadron flew conventional strategic bombing missions using high explosive bombs.

The squadron continued attacking urban areas with incendiary raids until the end of the war in August 1945, attacking major Japanese cities, causing massive destruction of urbanized areas. Also conducted raids against strategic objectives, bombing aircraft factories, chemical plants, oil refineries, and other targets in Japan. The squadron flew its last combat missions on 14 August when hostilities ended. Afterwards, its B 29s carried relief supplies to Allied prisoner of war camps in Japan and Manchuria.

The squadron remained in Western Pacific, although largely demobilized in the fall of 1945. Some aircraft were scrapped on Tinian; others flown to storage depots in the United States. It was inactivated as part of Army Service forces at the end of 1945.

=== Strategic Air Command ===
It was reactivated as a Strategic Air Command Boeing B-52G Stratofortress strategic bombardment squadron in 1963, receiving the mission, personnel, aircraft, and equipment of the 301st Bombardment Squadron, which was inactivated. This was part of a Strategic Air Command (SAC) program to provide units with a combat lineage. The squadron performed operational testing of new equipment at Eglin Air Force Base between 1963 and 1965. It moved to Barksdale Air Force Base in 1965 and stood nuclear alert duties. It deployed aircraft and crews to the western Pacific and engaged in combat operations over Indochina as part of Operation Arc Light from 1966 to 1972. The unit returned to training status and stood nuclear alert after the end of the Vietnam War. Aircraft and personnel of the squadron deployed to the 806th Bombardment Wing, Provisional at RAF Fairford, England, Jan-Mar 1991 (Operation Desert Storm). It was inactivated in 1993 as part of the USAF drawdown after the end of the Cold War and retirement of the B-52G.

== Lineage ==
- Constituted as the 62d Bombardment Squadron (Heavy) on 20 November 1940

Activated on 15 January 1941
Inactivated on 1 April 1944
Redesignated 62d Bombardment Squadron, Very Heavy and activated on 1 April 1944
Inactivated on 27 December 1945

- Redesignated 62d Bombardment Squadron, Heavy and activated, on 15 November 1962 (not organized)

Organized on 1 February 1963
Redesignated 62d Bomb Squadron on 1 September 1991
Inactivated on 18 January 1993

=== Assignments ===
- 39th Bombardment Group, 15 January 1941 – 1 April 1944
- 39th Bombardment Group, 1 April 1944 – 27 December 1945
- Strategic Air Command, 15 November 1962 (not organized)
- 39th Bombardment Wing, 1 February 1963
- 2d Bombardment Wing, 25 June 1965
- 2d Operations Group, 1 September 1991 – 18 January 1993

=== Stations ===
- Fort Douglas, Utah, 15 January 1941
- Geiger Field, Washington, 2 July 1941
- Davis-Monthan Field, Arizona, 5 February 1942 – 1 April 1944
- Smoky Hill Army Air Field, Kansas, 1 April 1944
- Dalhart Army Air Field, Texas, 27 May 1944
- Smoky Hill Army Air Field, Kansas, 17 July 1944 – 8 January 1945
- North Field, Guam, Northern Mariana Islands, 18 February 1945 – 16 November 1945
- Camp Anza, California, 14 December 1945 – 27 December 1945
- Eglin Air Force Base, Florida, 1 February 1963
- Barksdale Air Force Base, Louisiana, 25 June 1965 – 18 January 1993

=== Aircraft ===
- Boeing B-17 Flying Fortress, 1941–1942
- Consolidated B-24 Liberator, 1942–1944
- Boeing B-29 Superfortress, 1944–1945
- Boeing B-52 Stratofortress, 1963–1993

== See also ==
- List of B-52 Units of the United States Air Force

== Bibliography ==
- Craven, Wesley F.; Cate, James L., eds. (1955). The Army Air Forces in World War II (PDF). Vol. VI, Men & Planes. Chicago, IL: University of Chicago Press. LCCN 48003657. OCLC 704158. Archived from the original (PDF) on 20 December 2016.

Goss, William A. (1955). "The Organization and its Responsibilities, Chapter 2 The AAF". In Craven, Wesley F.; Cate, James L. (eds.). The Army Air Forces in World War II (PDF). Vol. VI, Men & Planes. Chicago, IL: University of Chicago Press. LCCN 48003657. OCLC 704158.
Greer, Thomas H. (1955). "Recruitment and Training, Chapter 18 Combat Crew and Unit Training". In Craven, Wesley F.; Cate, James L. (eds.). The Army Air Forces in World War II (PDF). Vol. VI, Men & Planes. Chicago, IL: University of Chicago Press. LCCN 48003657. OCLC 704158.

- Maurer, Maurer, ed. (1983) [1961]. Air Force Combat Units of World War II (PDF) (reprint ed.). Washington, DC: Office of Air Force History. ISBN 0-912799-02-1. LCCN 61060979. Archived from the original (PDF) on 20 December 2016.
- Maurer, Maurer, ed. (1982) [1969]. Combat Squadrons of the Air Force, World War II (PDF) (reprint ed.). Washington, DC: Office of Air Force History. ISBN 0-405-12194-6. LCCN 70605402. OCLC 72556. Archived from the original (PDF) on 20 December 2016.
- Ravenstein, Charles A. (1984). Air Force Combat Wings, Lineage & Honors Histories 1947-1977 (PDF). Washington, DC: Office of Air Force History. ISBN 0-912799-12-9.
