= 301st Bombardment Squadron =

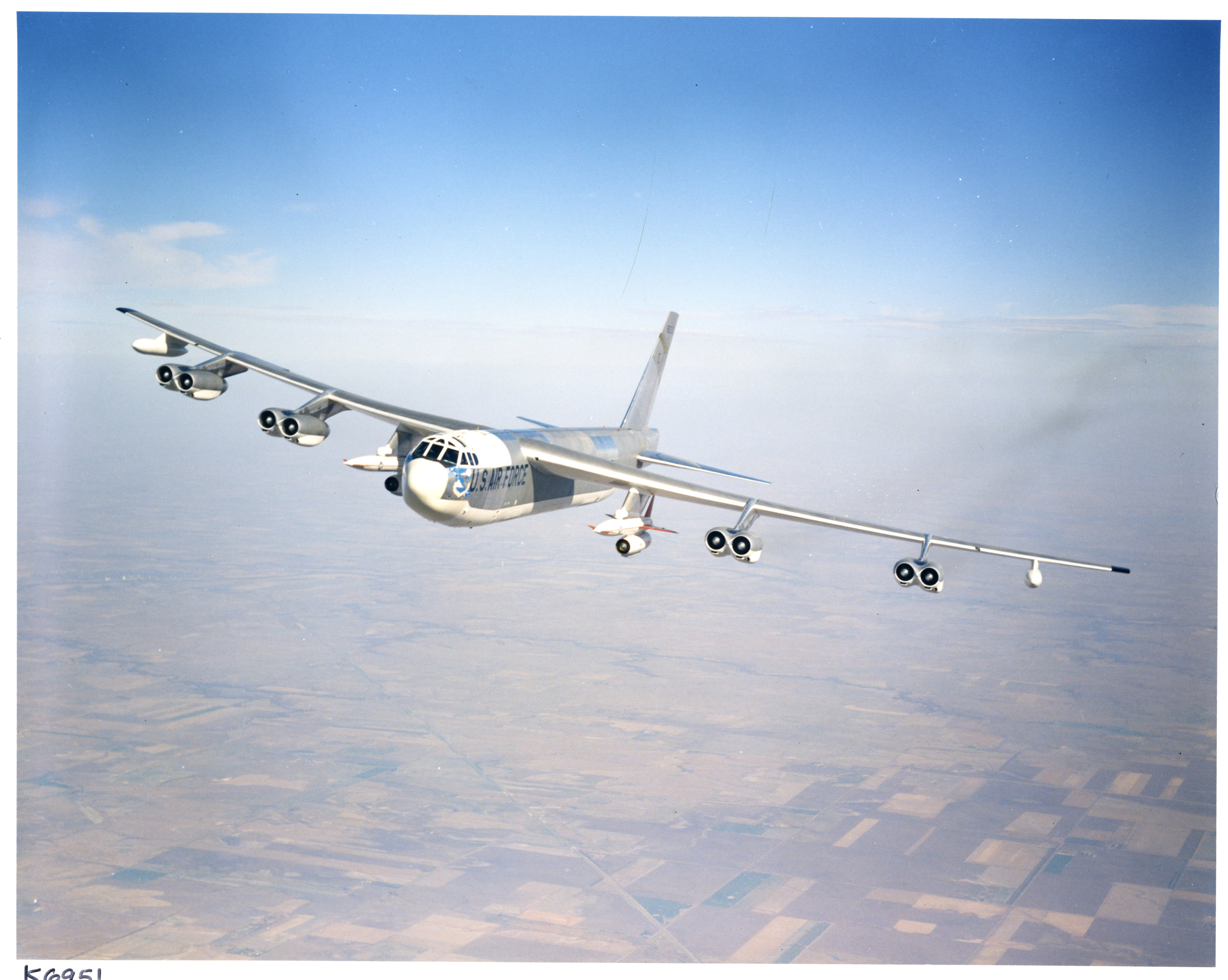
- B-52G Stratofortress flight testing AGM-28 Hound Dogs
- Active: 1952–1963
- Country: United States
- Branch: United States Air Force
- Role: Strategic bomber
- Decorations: Air Force Outstanding Unit Award

Insignia
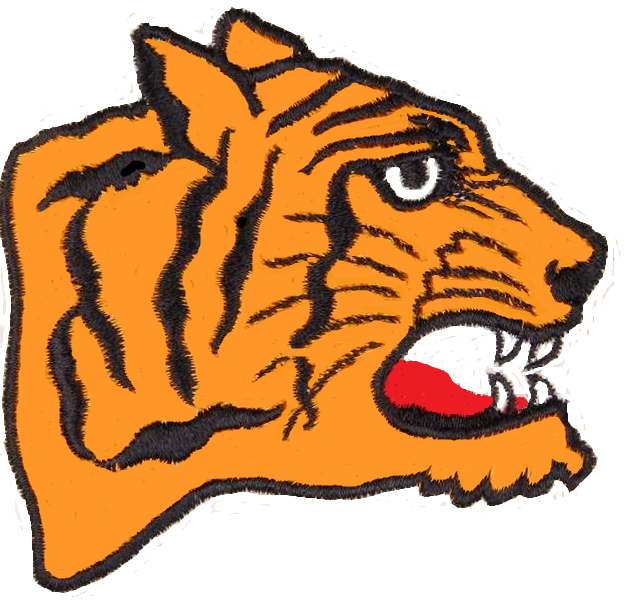
- 301st Bombardment Squadron patch (Note: The squadron apparently had no officially approved emblem, but members wore this patch while at Ramey.)

The 301st Bombardment Squadron is an inactive United States Air Force unit. It was activated at Ramey Air Force Base, Puerto Rico in June 1952 as the 301st Strategic Reconnaissance Squadron and equipped with Convair RB-36 Peacemakers. From Ramey, it trained for long range reconnaissance and, later, as the 301st Bombardment Squadron, bombardment missions. It became non-operational in 1958 as its parent wing prepared to transition to the Boeing B-52 Stratofortress. As Strategic Air Command dispersed its strategic bomber force, it moved to Eglin Air Force Base, Florida, where it was assigned to the 4135th Strategic Wing and began to equip with B-52s. At Eglin, it stood alert and participated in the testing of the AGM-28 Hound Dog missile. It was inactivated on 1 February 1963, transferring its personnel, equipment and mission to another unit.

== History ==
=== B-36 Operations at Ramey Air Force Base ===
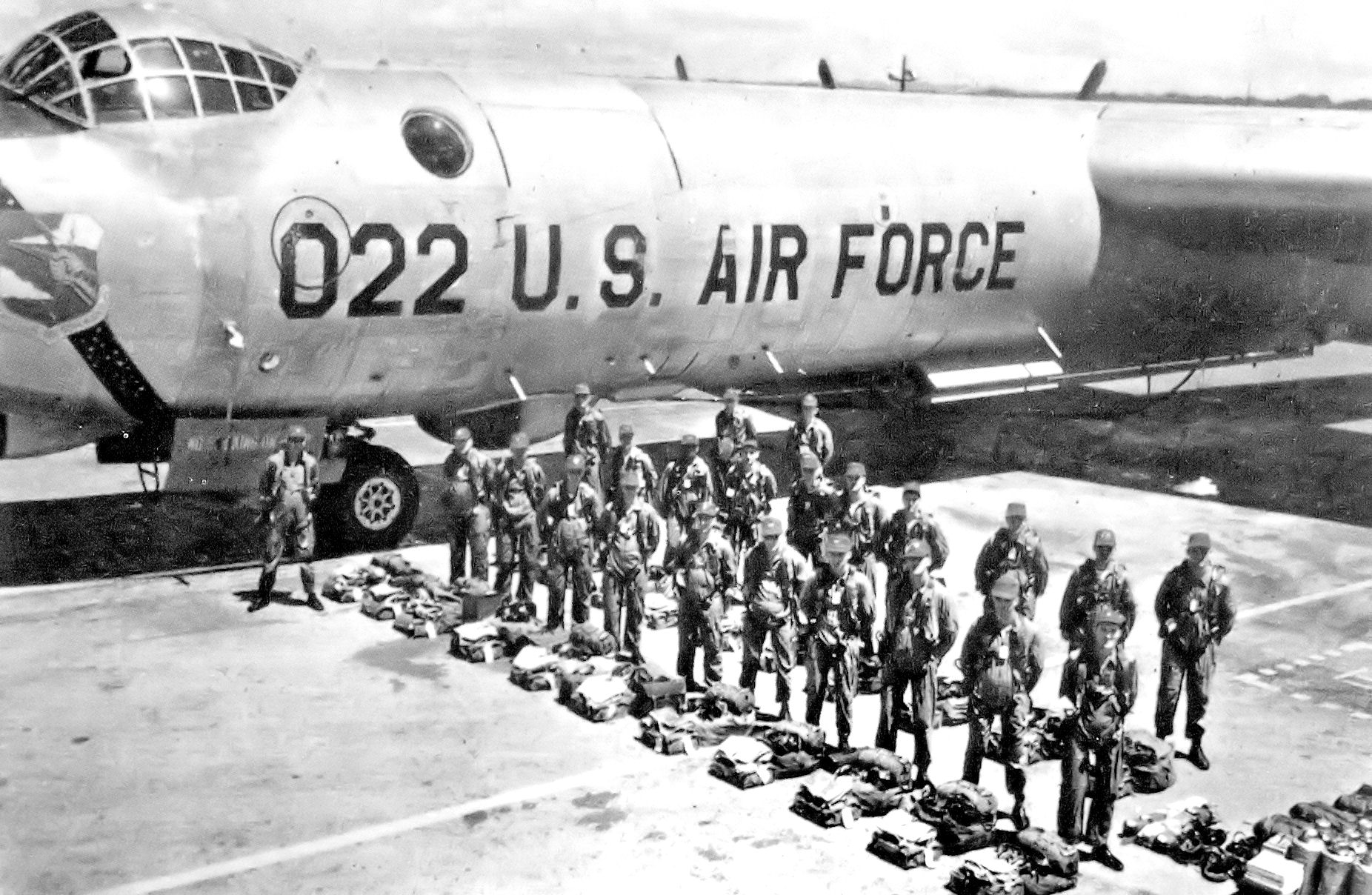
72d Strategic Reconnaissance Wing crew with a RB-36 Peacemaker

The squadron was activated along with the 72d Strategic Reconnaissance Wing at Ramey Air Force Base, Puerto Rico in June 1952. The wing and squadron remained non-operational until October, when the 55th Strategic Reconnaissance Wing moved from Ramey to Forbes Air Force Base, Kansas. The 72d Wing absorbed the residual resources of the 55th Wing at Ramey.

Convair RB-36 Peacemakers began arriving at Ramey in early 1953, and by March the squadron had received five aircraft. The squadron performed global strategic reconnaissance in the form of radar scope photography and photographic charting for development of maps and targeting materials. On 16 June 1954 the squadron, along with Strategic Air Command (SAC)'s other B-36 reconnaissance units, was assigned bombing as its primary mission, although it retained its designations as a reconnaissance unit, and secondary reconnaissance capability until October 1955, when it became the 301st Bombardment Squadron.

In September 1958, the squadron became nonoperational as the 72d Wing began preparations to transition to the Boeing B-52 Stratofortress.

=== B-52 Operations at Eglin Air Force Base ===
However, SAC bases with large concentrations of bombers made attractive targets. SAC's response was to break up its wings and disperse its B-52 force to smaller wings with 15 bombers each at a larger number of bases This not only complicated Soviet targeting planning, but with more runways, it would take less time to launch the bomber force. Implementing this plan, the 301st moved to Eglin Air Force Base, Florida, where it was assigned to the 4135th Strategic Wing. The squadron received its first Boeing B-52G Stratofortress at Eglin in July 1959.

General Thomas S. Power established an initial goal of maintaining one third of SAC's planes on fifteen minute ground alert, fully fueled and ready for combat to reduce vulnerability to a Soviet missile strike. Twenty per cent of SAC's bombers and tankers were on alert by 1959, although the squadron did not begin to stand alert until January 1960. The command's goal of one third of its bombers on alert was finally reached in 1960. The SAC alert commitment was increased to half the squadron's aircraft in 1962.

At Eglin, the squadron also participated in testing for the North American GAM-77 Hound Dog (Note: When a uniform Department of Defense designation system was adopted in 1962, the Hound Dog became the AGM-28.) air launched cruise missile. On 7 January 1959, the squadron received its first B-52G modified to launch the Hound Dog. The first air launch of a prototype Hound Dog at Eglin took place on 23 April 1959, but the squadron did not receive operational Hound Dogs until December. During testing, one Hound Dog crashed near the town of Samson, Alabama when it failed to self-destruct. In May 1962, the squadron participated in Operation Silk Hat. During this exercise a low level Hound Dog test launch was conducted before an audience including President John F. Kennedy and Vice President Lyndon B. Johnson.

The squadron was also the first B-52 unit with the McDonnell GAM-72 Quail, (Note: The Quail's post-1962 designation was ADM-20.) receiving a flight test model of the decoy missile on 27 February 1960. It made its first test launch of the Quail over the Gulf Test Range on 8 June, and in October, it became the first B-52 unit to receive operational missiles. The squadron became the first in SAC to be operational with the Quail in February 1961. (Note: Although combat evaluation launches of the Quail were performed at Eglin in late 1961, they were not performed by the 301st, but by the 73rd Bombardment Squadron, deployed from Seymour Johnson Air Force Base, North Carolina. SAC Missile Chronology, p. 33.) As SAC equipped B-52 units with the Hound Dog and Quail, the 4135th Wing became the initial schoolhouse for training them on the missiles.

SAC planners were looking into additional methods to protect their forces in addition to the ground alert program as early as 1957. Tests under the name Operation Head Start were precursors to Operation Chrome Dome. In January 1961, SAC disclosed it was maintaining an airborne force for "airborne alert training." On 1 April 1962, the squadron began periodically flying Chrome Dome airborne alert missions.

Soon after detection of Soviet missiles in Cuba, SAC brought all degraded and adjusted alert sorties up to full capability. It withdrew its forces from MacDill, McCoy, and Homestead Air Force Bases as these bases became saturated with tactical forces. By 24 October, all bombers from these bases had left Florida in Operation Riders Up, leaving the 301st's B-52s the closest to Cuba. On 20 October, the squadron was directed to put two additional planes on alert. On 22 October, the squadron began to launch two airborne alert sorties daily. On 24 October SAC went to DEFCON 2, placing all the squadron's aircraft on alert. As tensions began to ease, on 21 November SAC went to DEFCON 3 and returned to its normal airborne alert posture. On 27 November SAC returned to its normal ground alert posture.

The 4135th Wing was a Major Command controlled (MAJCON) wing. (Note: MAJCON units could not carry a permanent history or lineage. Ravenstein, Charles A. (1984). A Guide to Air Force Lineage and Honors (2d, Revised ed.). Maxwell AFB, AL: USAF Historical Research Center. p. 12..) SAC received authority from Headquarters USAF to discontinue its MAJCON strategic wings that were equipped with combat aircraft and to activate Air Force controlled (AFCON) units, most of which were inactive at the time, but which could carry a permanent lineage and history. When the 4135th was replaced by the 39th Bombardment Wing in February 1963, The 301st Squadron was inactivated with it and its mission, aircraft and personnel were transferred to the 62d Bombardment Squadron, which was simultaneously activated.

== Lineage ==
- Constituted as the 301st Strategic Reconnaissance Squadron, Heavy on 4 June 1952

Activated on 16 June 1952
Redesignated 301st Bombardment Squadron, Heavy on 1 October 1955
Discontinued, and inactivated on 1 February 1963

=== Assignments ===
- 72d Strategic Reconnaissance Wing (later 72d Bombardment Wing), 16 June 1952 – 17 June 1959 (not operational 16 June – 15 March 1953 and after 11 September 1958)
- 4135th Strategic Wing, 17 June 1959 – 1 February 1963

=== Stations ===
- Ramey Air Force Base, Puerto Rico, 16 June 1952
- Eglin Air Force Base, Florida, 17 June 1959 – 1 February 1963

=== Aircraft ===
- Convair RB-36 Peacemaker (later B-36), 1952–1958
- Boeing B-52 Stratofortress, 1959–1963

=== Awards and campaigns ===
Award streamer	Award	Dates	Notes
	Air Force Outstanding Unit Award	1 October 1957 – 1 June 1958	301st Bombardment Squadron

== See also ==
- List of B-52 Units of the United States Air Force
