= Knoxville Municipal Airport =

- IATA: OXV; ICAO: KOXV; FAA LID: OXV

Summary
- Airport type: Public
- Owner: City of Knoxville, IA
- Serves: Knoxville, Iowa
- Location: Knoxville, Iowa, U.S.
- Opened: 1981
- Elevation AMSL: 928.3 ft (282.9 m)
- Coordinates: 41°17′57″N 093°06′49″W

Map
- Location of airport in Iowa/ United States OXV (the United States)

Runways
Direction	Length		Surface
Direction	ft	m	Surface
15/33	4,000	1,219
- Sources: FAA

Knoxville Municipal Airport (also known as Jim Bellamy Field) (IATA: OXV, ICAO: KOXV) is an airport in Knoxville, Iowa, United States.

== See also ==
- List of airports in Iowa
