= Embassy of the United States, Ankara =

Embassy of the US in Ankara, Turkey

Embassy of the United States in Ankara
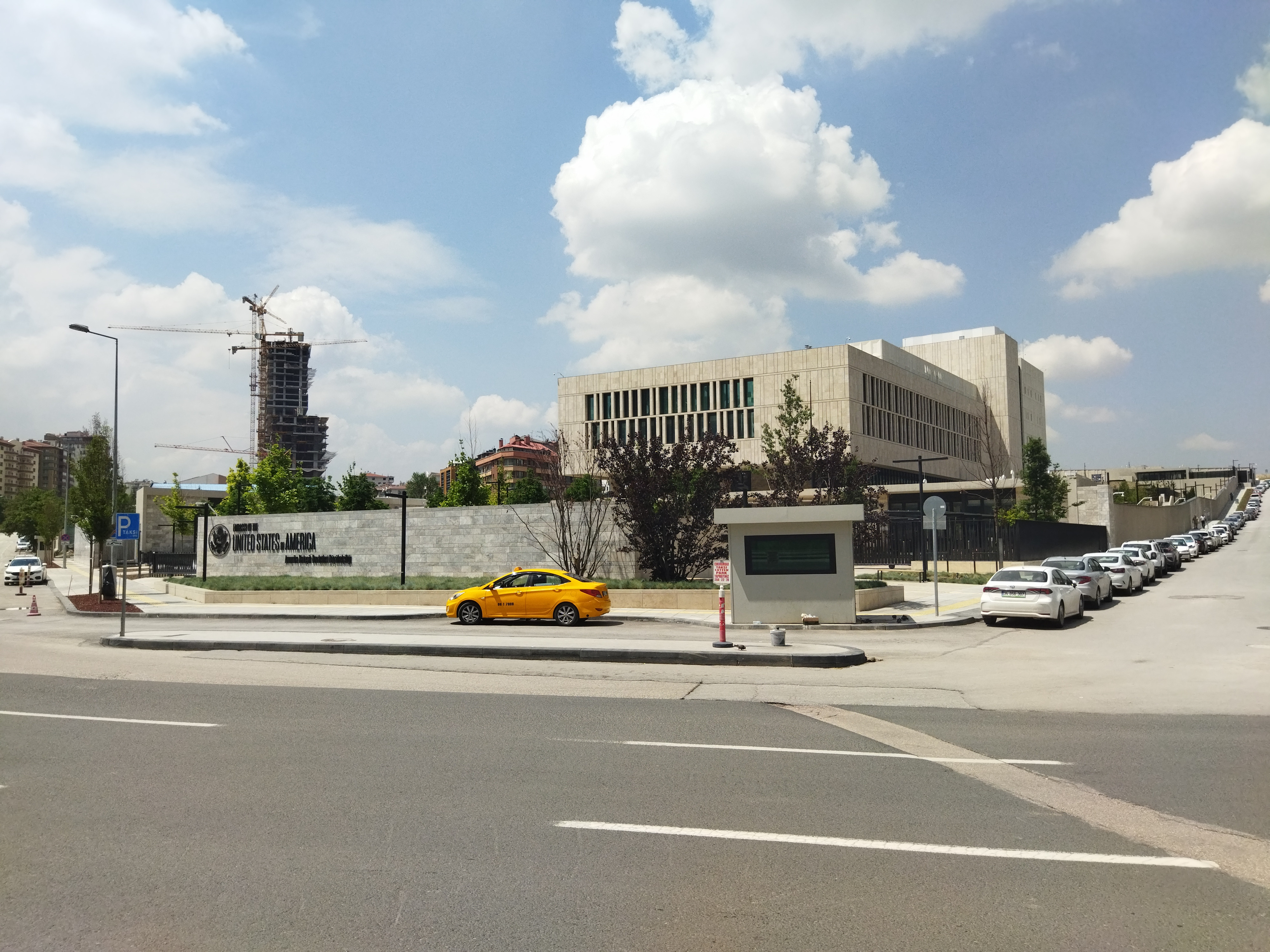
- Location: Çankaya, Ankara
- Address: Çukurambar Mah. 1480 Sok. No: 1 06530, Çankaya, Ankara
- Coordinates: 39.90906023274922°N 32.803214633336054°E
- Opened: 1906
- Website: Official website

The Embassy of the United States in Ankara (Turkish: Amerika Birleşik Devletleri'nin Ankara Büyükelçiliği) is the embassy of the United States located in the capital city of Ankara, Turkey. The embassy is situated next to the Besa Kule Business Centre in Çankaya at 1480. Sk. No:1 Çukurambar. The diplomatic mission of the United States was established in April 1831 as a legation, and was elevated to an embassy in 1906.

== History ==
The United States and Turkey's diplomatic relationship began in the early 19th century when Turkey was part of the Ottoman Empire. The two nations officially recognized each other on February 11, 1830. A treaty of navigation and commerce was successfully negotiated by U.S. representatives, Captain James Biddle, David Offley, and Charles Rhind, with the Turkish Minister of Foreign Affairs. The formal U.S. diplomatic mission in the Ottoman Empire was established on September 13, 1831, when David Porter became the Charges d’Affaires at the American Legation in Constantinople (present-day Istanbul).

On June 18, 1906, the American Legation in Constantinople was upgraded to embassy status. John G. A. Leishman confirmed his role as the official Ambassador on October 5, 1906.

The outbreak of World War I led to a rupture in Turkey–United States relations. After the U.S. declared war on Germany in April 1917, Turkey cut off its diplomatic ties with the U.S. on April 20, 1917. This hiatus lasted for ten years. With the dissolution of the Ottoman Empire post-WWI and the establishment of modern-day Turkey, both countries took steps to mend their diplomatic ties. Relations were formally reinstated on February 17, 1927, through an exchange of notes in Ankara.

== Mission ==
The primary objective of the Embassy of the United States in Ankara is to uphold the interests of the United States and safeguard its citizens in Turkey. The mission carries out a multifaceted role that includes:

- Promoting American commercial interests in Turkey, which the U.S. Department of Commerce recognizes as a significant emerging market.
- Advocating for Turkish democracy, economic prosperity, human rights, and territorial sovereignty.
- Ensuring strong security collaboration based on mutual interests.
- Aiming for improved relations between Turkey and Greece and a lasting solution to the Cyprus problem.
- Collaborating in counter-terrorism efforts, promoting peace in regions like the Middle East and the Balkans, countering drug trafficking and money laundering, facilitating oil and gas transportation from the Caspian basin through Turkey, and maintaining robust defense cooperation.

== See also ==
- United States–Turkey relations
