= Operation Chrome Dome =

1960s US military operation patrolling Soviet territory

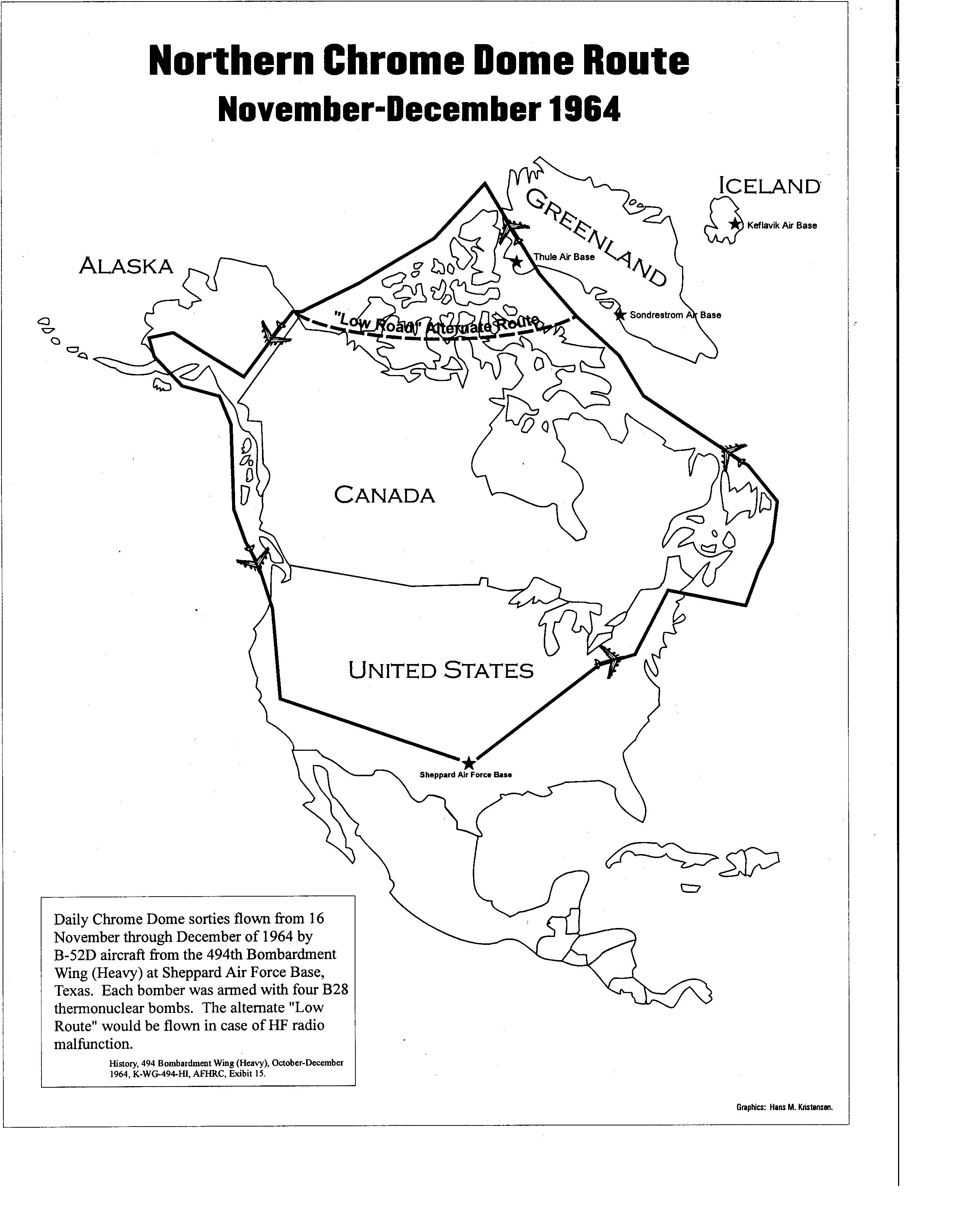
1964 Operation Chrome Dome Map from Sheppard Air Force Base, TX

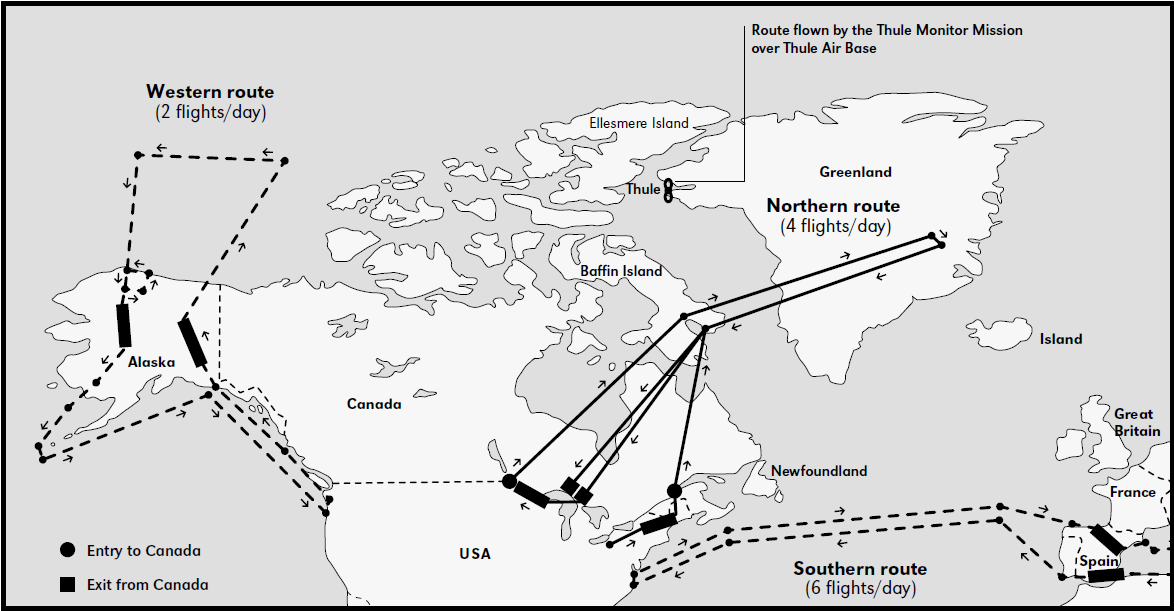
1966 overview of US airborne alert routes, based on a document used by White House staff.

Operation Chrome Dome was a United States Air Force Cold War-era mission from 1961 to 1968 in which B-52 strategic bomber aircraft armed with thermonuclear weapons remained on continuous airborne alert, flying routes that put them in positions to attack targets in the Soviet Union if they were ordered to do so. The exact routes varied by year, but in general there were routes that went to positions over the Canadian arctic, Alaska, Greenland, and the Mediterranean Sea. Many American Air Force bases in the 1960s allocated at least one bomber crew to "Chrome Dome" duty on a regular basis, and many other bases, including foreign bases, were involved in the refueling operations. Over the years the mission involved overflights of American, Canadian, Danish (Greenland), and Spanish territory, among others.

The goal of "Chrome Dome" was to keep a number of nuclear-armed aircraft in a position to help guarantee nuclear retaliation against the Soviet Union in the event that the latter was able to destroy the majority of US nuclear weapons still on the ground. The operation also ensured that Strategic Air Command bomber crews had experience with airborne alert procedures so that, in the event of heightened concern, the number of patrolling bombers could be increased dramatically.

Several high-profile nuclear accidents were associated with the "Chrome Dome" program, including the accidental release of nuclear weapons on foreign territory, and the mission ended following one such accident, the 1968 Thule Air Base B-52 crash.

== Background: airborne alert ==
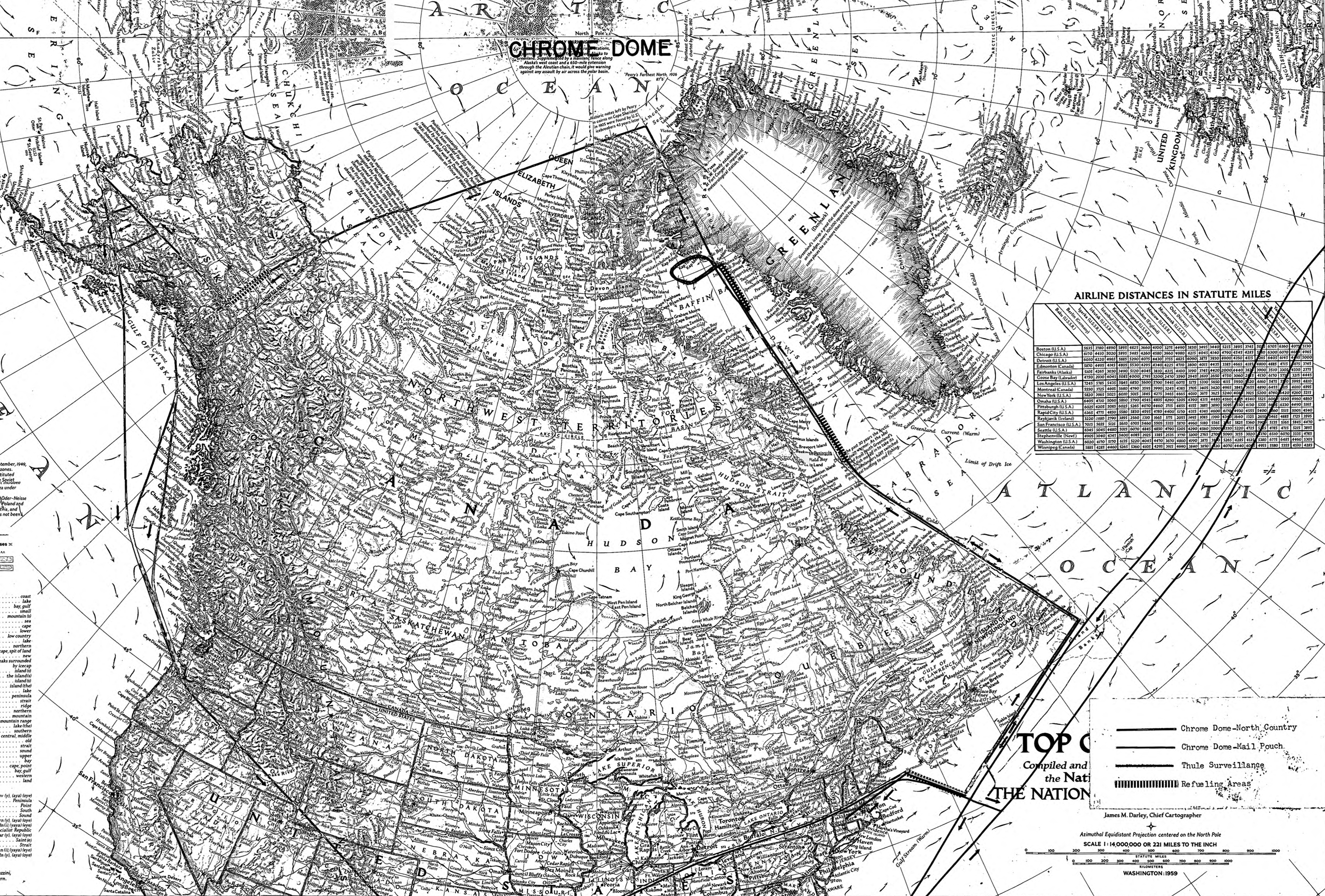
Operation Chrome Dome flight routes proposed in October 1961; this image comes from Royal Canadian Air Force files and so is focused on the aspects of the flight that overlapped with Canadian airspace, but part of the Mediterranean route is also visible, as is the observation of the Thule early warning site.

After the Soviet Union's launch of Sputnik 1 and Sputnik 2 satellites in 1957, US military planners feared that intercontinental ballistic missiles could under some circumstances destroy the bomber forces of the Strategic Air Command (SAC) prior to their taking off. General Curtis LeMay had, prior to this, worked to reduce the ground-based alert time for SAC's B-52 bomber forces to 15 minutes, but the new SAC commander, General Thomas S. Power, pushed to augment this with a full airborne-alert program, in which some portion of the American B-52 bomber force would be airborne and armed with nuclear weapons 24 hours a day. This would make it impossible for an incoming attack to destroy the entirety of the US continental nuclear forces, guaranteeing the possibility of a retaliatory strike.

The initial pilot program in 1958 saw one bomb wing launching a combat-ready B-52 every six hours. Over the years, this expanded to SAC launching 12 sorties per day by late 1961. By 1960–1961, the alerts followed "ladder" routes that went from the United States up into the Canadian arctic. Over the course of 1961, there were several distinct operations that gradually increased the number of planes involved. The purpose of all of these named missions was "indoctrination": while acting as an active airborne alert operation, they were also meant to be training missions for a more general airborne alert with many more planes. The ultimate plans called for the ability to maintain at least 1/16th of the entire SAC bomber forces in the air at any given time in a period of high alert. The operations of 1961, each using 12 bomber sorties, were: "Cover All" (15 January–31 March), "Clear Road" (1 April–30 June), "Keen Axe" (1 July–30 September), and "Wire Brush" (1 October–5 November). "Wire Brush," for example, involved at least 11 B-52s, each launched from a different American airbase, traveling along 6 different routes over Canadian airspace.

During Operation "Cover All", there were at least two serious accidents involving B-52s and nuclear weapons, one near Goldsboro, North Carolina, and another a few weeks later near Yuba City, California.

As the number of bombers increased, the route became congested in a way that made it clear that getting to 1/16th airborne alert status, or an even more ambitious 1/8th status, would jeopardize flight safety. Operation "Chrome Dome" was conceived of as a revision to the original "ladder" routine, as well as an attempt to make the airborne alert program a "regular" one, rather than the short-term alert programs that had preceded it. The new plan would use two routes, one circumnavigating Canada known as "North Country", the other traversing the Atlantic to the Western Mediterranean Sea (known as "Mail Pouch"). These planes would be refueled in-flight by KC-135 aircraft operating out of bases in the northeast United States, Alaska, and Spain. "Chrome Dome" was approved by the Department of Defense and began in November 1961, with four strategic wings and two bomb wings flying one sortie a day, and one bomb wing flying two sorties a day, on the northern route, and four strategic wings flying one sortie a day on the southern route. Two of these 12 bombers per day were sent to monitor the BMEWS facility near Thule, Greenland. After several weeks of operation, the planners judged "Chrome Dome" a success in addressing the problems created in previous operations. It was explicitly planned that, in times of high alert, the number of B-52s on the "Chrome Dome" routes could be increased far above the twelve daily flights.

"Chrome Dome" is the best-known of the SAC airborne alert programs, in part because several high-profile "Broken Arrow" nuclear weapons accidents became associated with it, including the 1968 accident at Thule which ended the program. But it was not the only such program; it existed side-by-side with other, more-temporary airborne alert programs with names like "Hard Head", "Round Robin", and "Butterknife". As an official history put it, "Operation Chrome Dome was only the most dramatic and best known program requiring that nuclear weapons be kept aloft."

== Cuban Missile Crisis ==
On 22 October 1962, during the Cuban Missile Crisis, the airborne alert was immediately increased 1/8th level under an order by General Power for the first and only time. This involved using existing "Chrome Dome" procedures, including those designed to enable the scaling up of forces dramatically and quickly, as well as the existing "Chrome Dome" flight routes. The greatest increase in traffic during this period was on the southern route because of refueling limitations at the Eielson AFB in Alaska. The increase meant that initially 66 B-52s launched daily (28 on the northern route, 36 on the southern route, with still only 2 monitoring Thule). Such was the priority in increasing the number of flights that on 24 October, SAC authorized that B-52s could still run their "sorties" even if one of their engines was shut down. By 5 November the total number of daily B-52s launches was increased to 75 (42 planes on the northern route, 31 on the southern route, 2 on Thule duty). This level of alert was maintained until 21 November, almost 30 days, at which point the alert level was reduced to the previous "indoctrination" level. During that month, 2,088 B-52 aircraft sorties were launched, all carrying multiple thermonuclear bombs, and they logged 41,168 flying hours. At peak strength, approximately 65 planes were "target effective" at any given time. President John F. Kennedy presented Power with a flight safety award in December 1962 as a result of the fact that no accidents of significance were reported during this period.

== Primary mission ==
The missions in 1964 involved a B-52D that left Sheppard Air Force Base, Texas, and flew across the United States to New England and headed out to the Atlantic Ocean. The aircraft refueled over the Atlantic heading north to and around Newfoundland. The bomber changed course and flew northwesterly over Baffin Bay towards Thule Air Base, Greenland. It then flew west across Queen Elizabeth Islands of Canada. Continuing to Alaska, it refueled over the Pacific Ocean, again heading southeast, and returned to Sheppard AFB.

By 1966, three separate missions were being flown: one east over the Atlantic and the Mediterranean, another north to Baffin Bay, and a third over Alaska.

== Military units ==
The following military units were involved:

- Strategic Air Command Divisions:
  - 306th Bombardment Wing
  - 494th Bombardment Wing, Sheppard Air Force Base
  - 821st Strategic Aerospace Division
  - 822d Air Division
- Homestead Air Force Base
- Strategic Air Command in the United Kingdom
- 2nd Bomb Wing, 62nd Bomb Squadron Barksdale AFB, Bossier City, Louisiana
- Strategic Air Command 42 Bomb Wing Loring AFB, Limestone, Maine
- 4126/456th bomb wing Beale AFB Marysville California

== Accidents ==
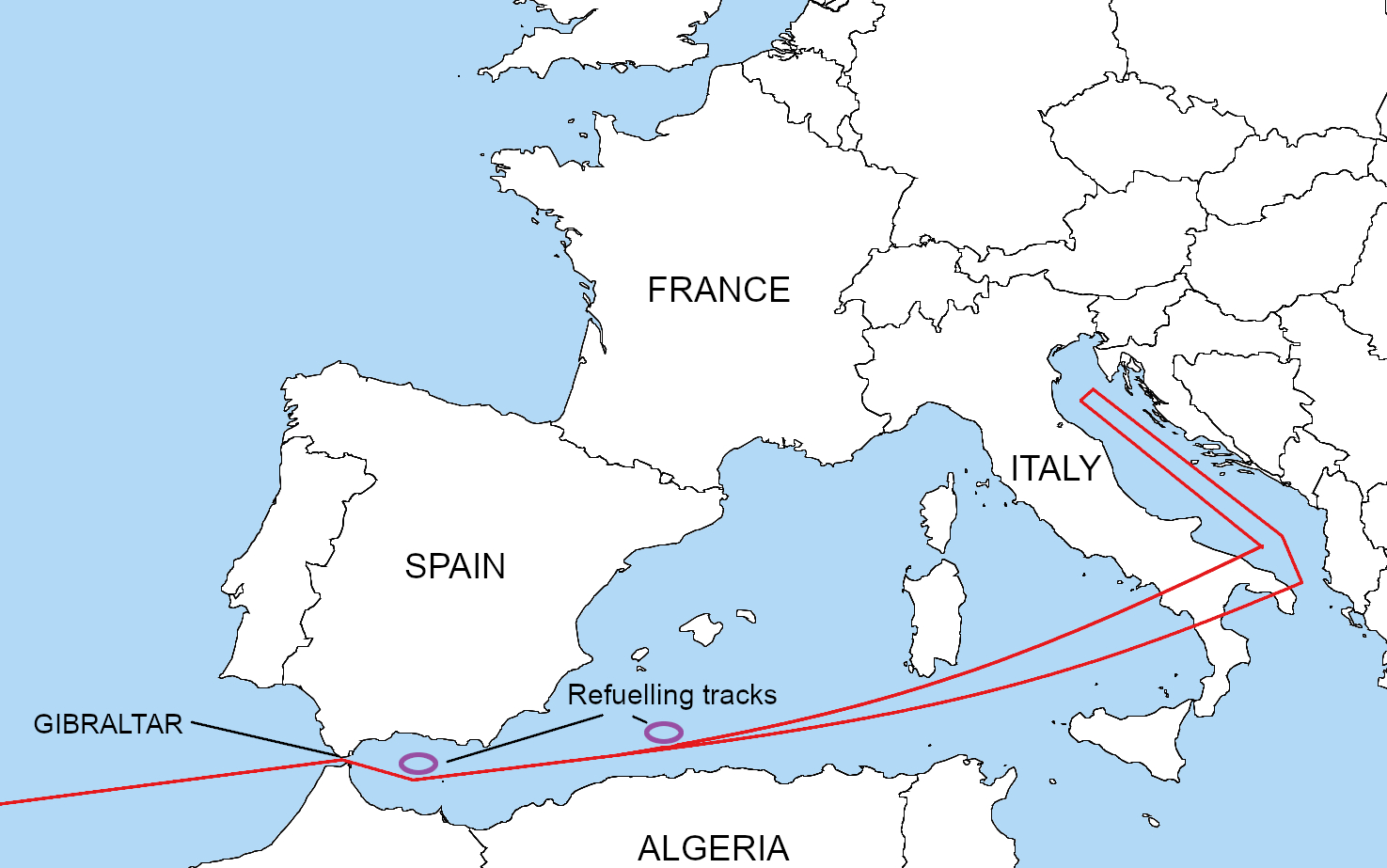
B-52 Airborne Nuclear Alert route from Homestead AFB, FL to Italy

The program and its antecedents was involved in the following nuclear-weapons accidents:

- 1961 Goldsboro B-52 crash (project "Cover All")
- 1961 Yuba City B-52 crash (project "Cover All")
- 1964 Savage Mountain B-52 crash (Note: Accident happened while the aircraft was returning to its home base, having already completed its alert mission.)
- 1966 Palomares B-52 crash
- 1968 Thule Air Base B-52 crash. The Thule accident signaled the end of the program on January 22, 1968.

== See also ==
- Fail-Safe (1964 film), a film about a strategic bomber aircraft that receives an attack order while patrolling the Soviet border.
- Dr. Strangelove (1964 film), a black comedy about a mad American general ordering nuclear bombers under his control on a Chrome Dome type alert, to attack the Soviet Union.
