= 501 (disambiguation) =

501 is a year in the Common Era.

501 may also refer to:

- 501 BC, a year in the era B.C.
- 501 (number)

== Military ==
- Avro 501, a military seaplane
- 501 Squadron (disambiguation), several units
- 501 Organization, a fictional unit from a Japanese anime series Ghost in the Shell: Arise

== Transportation ==
- List of highways numbered 501
- Flight 501 (disambiguation), several flights
- 501 Queen, a streetcar route in Toronto
- Allison 501, an aircraft turboprop engine
- BMW 501, a luxury car produced by BMW
- British Rail Class 501, an electric multiple unit train type
- Fiat 501, a small family car produced by Fiat

== Other uses ==
- 501, the name of a game of darts
- Section 501, a provision of the Australian Migration Act 1958
- The record score in first-class cricket by Brian Lara, and also Lara's brand of clothing in honour of this event
- a type of Levi's jeans
- an HTTP status code meaning Not implemented
- SMTP Error - 501, an SMTP status code meaning Syntax error in parameters or arguments
- 501(c), a type of tax exemption for non-profit organizations in the United States
- Area code 501, covering part of Arkansas, U.S.
- Year 501: The Conquest Continues, a book by Noam Chomsky
- 501 Urhixidur, an asteroid
- SARS-CoV-2 Beta variant, variant of COVID-19 also known as 501.V2 or 501Y.V2

== See also ==
- 501st (disambiguation)
