= 501st =

501st may refer to:

== Fiction ==
- 501st Legion (Star Wars), fictional legion within the Star Wars expanded universe
- 501st Joint Fighter Wing "Strike Witches", a fictional air force unit in the anime series Strike Witches

== Military ==
- 501st Heavy Panzer Battalion
- 501st Squadron (disambiguation), several units

=== United States ===
- 501st Combat Support Wing
- 501st Infantry Regiment (United States), an airborne forces regiment of the US Army
  - 501st Parachute Battalion, the first battalion-sized unit in the US Army airborne forces history
- 501st Military Intelligence Battalion (United States)
- 501st Military Intelligence Brigade (United States)
- 501st Sustainment Brigade (United States)
- 501st Aircraft Control and Warning Battalion, a forerunner of the 603rd Air Control Squadron
- 501st Reconnaissance Battalion, a former unit of the 15th Cavalry Regiment
- 501st Bombardment Group, a forerunner of the 501st Combat Support Wing
- 501st Tactical Missile Wing, a former unit of the United States Third Air Force

== Other uses ==
- 501st Legion, a fan-based organization dedicated to screen-accurate replicas of villain costumes from the Star Wars universe

== See also ==
- 501 (disambiguation)
