= 501st Regiment =

501st Regiment may refer to:

- 501st Aviation Regiment, United States
- 501st Infantry Regiment, United States
- 501e Régiment de chars de combat, France

== See also ==
- 501st (disambiguation)
