= Air Mobility Rodeo =

International airlift competition

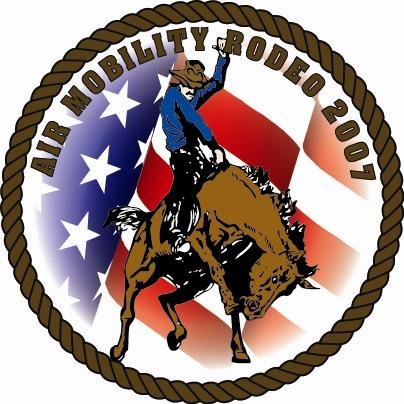
2007 Air Mobility RODEO Logo

The Air Mobility Rodeo was a biennial, international airlift competition hosted by the United States Air Force (USAF) Air Mobility Command (AMC). AMC gathers wings from active duty, reserve, and Air National Guard units from across the United States and around the world to test and improve tactics in a competitive environment. In this environment units are able to demonstrate capabilities, improve procedures, compare notes, and enhance standardization for global operations.

The final Air Mobility Rodeo was held at McChord Air Force Base, during July 2011. The USAF decided to replace it with a new AMC exercise called Mobility Guardian. The first Mobility Guardian exercise took place 30 July to 12 August 2017 at JB Lewis-McChord

== Operations ==
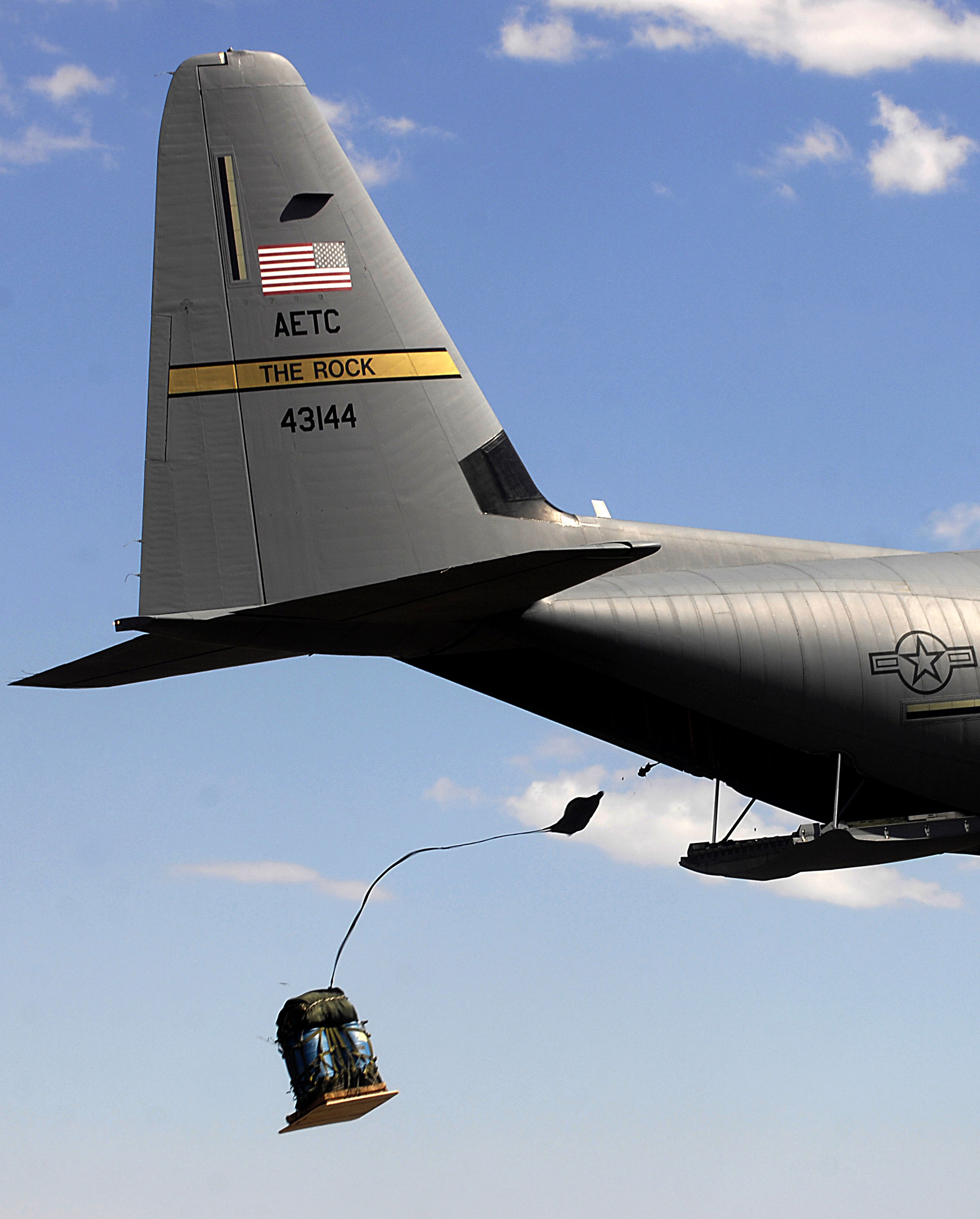
A C-130 conducting an airdrop during the 2007 Air Mobility Rodeo

The competition tests the flight and ground skills of security forces, aerial port operations, aeromedical evacuation, and maintenance team members.

== History ==
=== Background ===
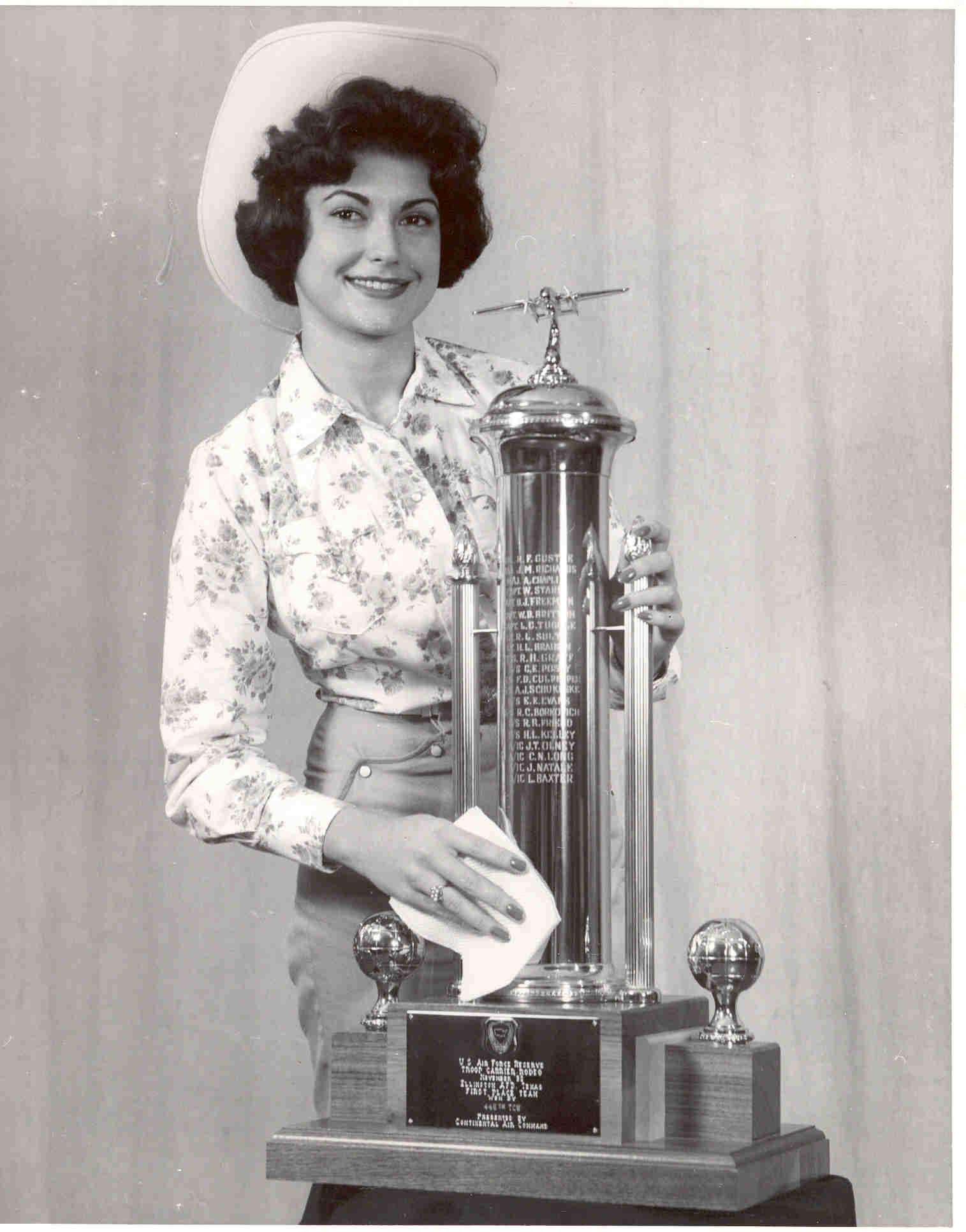
Air Mobility Command's Rodeo can trace its roots back to 1956 and the Continental Air Command's Rodeo competition. Pictured here is a display of the trophy from 1959.

The Rodeo competition name stems from the 1956 Reserve Troop Carrier Rodeo at Bakalar Air Force Base, Indiana hosted by the Continental Air Command.

The active-duty force of the early 1960s received its direction from Presidents Dwight Eisenhower and John F. Kennedy. The Eisenhower Administration recommended the Military Air Transport Service (MATS) change its mission from a passenger service to strictly military airlift as well as aligning tactical U.S. Army deployments under MATS.

The Kennedy Administration further stressed the importance of rapid global mobility in his first State of the Union Address stating “Obtaining air transport mobility—and obtaining it now—will better assure the ability of our conventional forces to respond, with discrimination and speed, to any problem at any spot on the globe at a moment's notice.” The President wanted the U.S. to have the capability to prevent both limited and guerrilla wars by being able to rapidly deploy military forces around the world.

Up to this direction from the Kennedy Administration MATS had only required troop carrier units equipped with C-124 Globemaster II aircraft to be qualified in its Computed Air Release Point (CARP) aerial delivery technique. The CARP technique required the aircrew to file a detailed flight plan detailing the route along with the exact Time on Target (TOT). Using the CARP process correctly would ensure that an airdrop would be made based on time and would allow the airdrop to take place even if at night or if the drop zone was obscured by weather. Beginning in January 1961, however, MATS required all C-124 units to become CARP qualified.

=== CARP Rodeo ===
Armed with this new direction in April 1961 the commander of the 1501st Air Transport Wing, Brigadier General Richard Bromiley, proposed a command-wide CARP Rodeo as a method to foster CARP training. While MATS was working out the details of such a competition the Western Transport Air Force (WESTAF) held its own CARP Rodeo between the 1501st Air Transport Wing and the 62d Air Transport Wing. On 11 July three crews for each wing flew low-level navigation routes and dropped miniature parachutes over part of Winters-Davis Airport near Travis Air Force Base, California. The 1501st won the competition over the 62d which had more experience with CARP operations.

Meanwhile, MATS was planning an annual, command-wide competition similar to Strategic Air Command's bombing competition and Tactical Air Command's William Tell Competition. The first of these was held at Scott Air Force Base, Illinois 16 – 22 April 1962. Seven wings, the 62d Air Transport Wing, 63d Troop Carrier Wing, 1501st Air Transport Wing, 1502d Air Transport Wing, 1503d Air Transport Wing, 1607th Air Transport Wing, and 1608th Air Transport Wing, each sent one aircraft and two crews to participate. This first official CARP Rodeo consisted of three events: a low-level, daylight, navigational mission, a similar night mission, and second daylight mission following a different route. During each mission the team dropped a 25 ounce shot bag attached to a miniature parachute simulating a 225 pound load. During the night missions a small flashlight taken from Mae West life preserver to aid in recovery. Combat Control teams from the 62d and 63d wings were stationed at the drop zones to recover and score drop accuracy.

On 1 April 1963 MATS required all units with airdrop capability to train formation flying, and the aerial delivery of personnel and equipment using CARP. This directive coupled with MATS’ desire to add realism led to the inclusion of formation flying, heavy cargo drops, and troop drops event in the 1963 CARP Rodeo. Because of the unavailability of a drop zone suitable for heavy cargo and paratroops near Scott Air Force Base the second competition was held at Dover Air Force Base, Delaware and took place 22 – 28 September. The same seven wings participated again with two crews and one C-124. However, both the 1501st and 1608th also entered a C-130 Hercules aircraft. Each crew flew a morning, afternoon, and night cargo drop. Additionally, each crew was required to drop a team from the 101st Airborne Division over Fort Campbell, Kentucky. The wings each also sent a ten-man maintenance team, their performance, however, was not part of the competition.

The third CARP Rodeo, held 9 – 13 November 1964 at Hunter Air Force Base, Georgia, expanded to include nine wings, including C-130 teams from the Naval Air Transport Wing, Atlantic and the Naval Air Transport Wing, Pacific. The 1964 competition followed the same format as the previous year's using drop zones on Fort Stewart, Georgia. The MATS commander, General Howell M. Estes II, named the trophies awarded in 1964 after former MATS commanders: the Lieutenant General Laurence S. Kuter Trophy was awarded to the C-124 team with the highest aggregate score, the Lieutenant General Joseph Smith Trophy went to the C-130 team with the highest aggregate score, the Lieutenant General William H. Tunner Trophy went to the team, C-124 or C-130, with the best single drop, and the General Joe W. Kelly Trophy was awarded the best crew, either C-124 or C-130.

As involvement in the Vietnam War began to escalate military resources were shifted toward supporting the fighting in Southeast Asia. Consequently, no Rodeo competitions were held after 1964.

=== Combat Airlift Competition ===
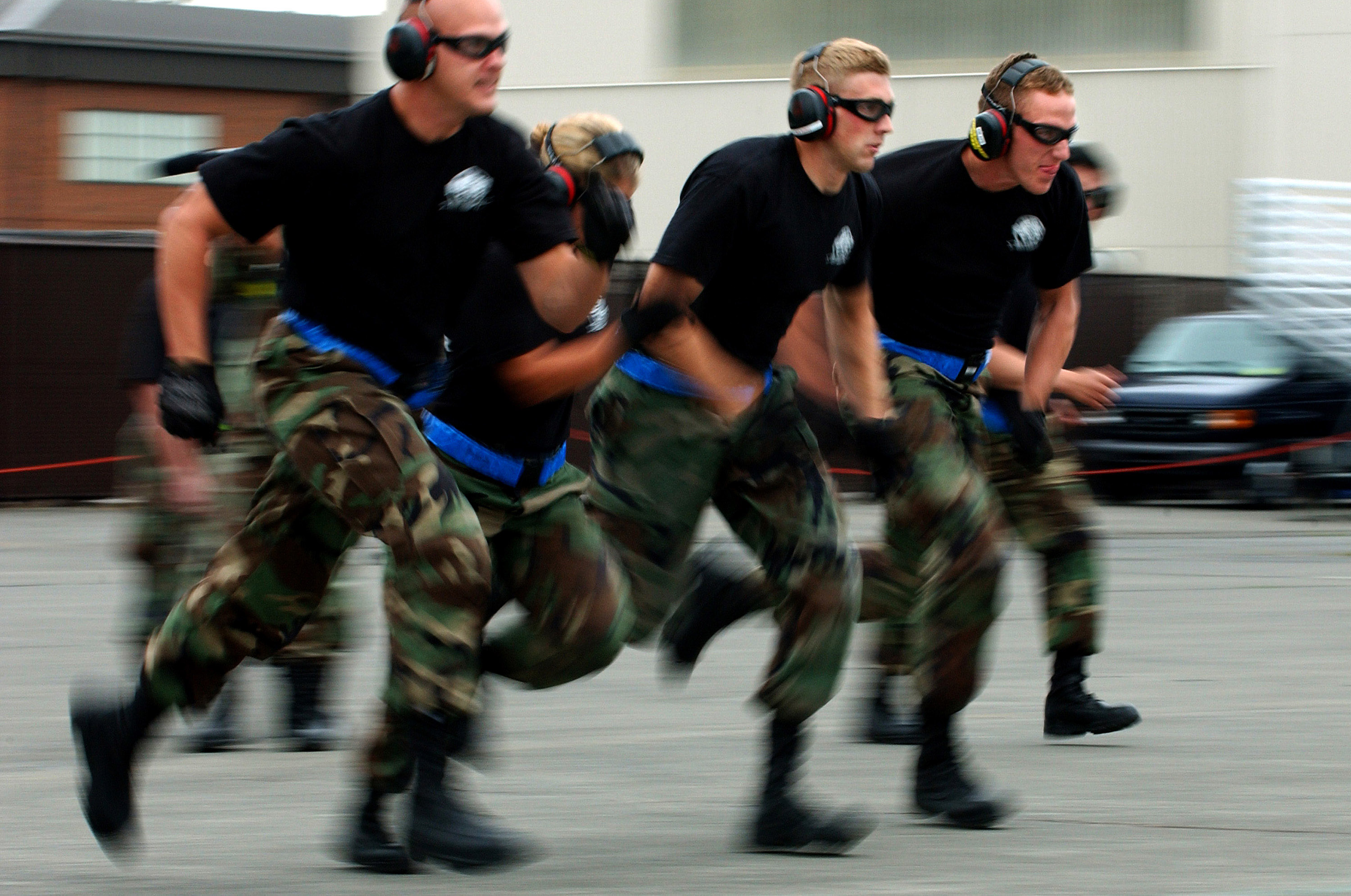
An aerial port team conducting an Engine Running Offload (ERO) during Rodeo 2007

MATS airdrop capabilities were greatly enhanced with the addition of the new C-141 Starlifter in late 1964. Two years later the Military Air Transport Service was redesignated the Military Airlift Command (MAC). By 1969 airlift requirements to Vietnam had declined to the level that allowed renewing an airdrop competition. Declining theater requirements coincided with the clear need for C-141 airdrop training. So, MAC held a Combat Airlift Competition from 12 – 20 July 1969 at Charleston Air Force Base, South Carolina for C-141 wings. The 60th, 62d, 63d, 436th, 437th, and 438th Military Airlift Wings each sent two aircrews, one maintenance crew, and one C-141 to participate. The competition involved using CARP procedures delivering both personnel and equipment during both day and night flying utilizing drop zones at Fort Bragg, North Carolina and Strategic Air Command's Radar Bomb Scoring Site at Richmond, Kentucky. For the first time the maintenance team received an evaluation and each team participated in an Engine Running Offload (ERO).

The second Combat Airlift Competition was held at Travis Air Force Base from 20 – 24 July 1970. This competition was the first to include Reserve associate aircrews. The number of participating wings grew to eight, however, each wing only sent one aircrew in addition to a single aircraft and maintenance team. Additionally, the two MAC numbered air forces, the 21st Air Force and the 22nd Air Force, each dispatched a Combat Control Team and an Aerial Delivery Team to compete. The 1970 competition was the first to include competitive events for the combat controllers including a physical fitness test, marksmanship, and a four-mile (6 km) orienteering course. Also, airdrops were conducted at four different drop zones: Mountain Home Air Force Base, Idaho, Wendover Auxiliary Field, Utah, Naval Air Station Fallon, Nevada, and Camp Roberts, California.

The Combat Airlift Competition was held at Charleston Air Force Base in 1971 and at Travis Air Force Base in 1972. Throughout these competitions MAC leadership noted that the increased emphasis on airdrop training had led to greater accuracy. The Circular Error Average (CEA) had been over 200 yards (180 m) during the first CARP Rodeo in 1962. By 1971 it was down to 77 yards (70 m) and in 1972 the CEA for the Combat Airlift Competition was only 24.33 yards (22.25 m).

As the Vietnam War ended the U.S. military began to restructure. In MAC part of that restructuring including cutting back on airdrop training, and in 1973 airdrop training was halted at Dover, McChord, McGuire, and Travis Air Force Bases and reduced its total air drop crew force to 40 active duty and eight associate reserve crews. Additionally, due to budgetary constraints MAC discontinued Combat Airlift Competitions.

Over the next two years tactical airlift units were transferred from Tactical Air Command to Military Airlift Command. These units were composed primarily of C-7 Caribou, C-123 Provider, and C-130 aircraft. Following this transfer the MAC commander, General Paul K. Carlton established the USAF Airlift Center at Pope Air Force Base to conduct testing of tactical airlift procedures and equipment.

=== Volant Rodeo ===
By the late 1970s the U.S. military focus was shifting away from Southeast Asia and toward supporting NATO in Europe. Department of Defense leadership mandated capability to rapidly reinforce Europe while also dispatching forces to deal simultaneous crises in other parts of the world. With this direction MAC decided to renew its emphasis on airdrop procedures as a means of rapid delivery. MAC leadership again considered a competition format as an excellent way to gauge the level of proficiency and refine airdrop techniques.

In 1979 the MAC commander, General William Moore, directed each MAC wing to participate in the first Volant Rodeo, held at Pope Air Force Base from 3 – 9 June that year. He also invited the Air Force Reserve Command and the Air National Guard to participate. In all 31 teams competed flying C-7, C-123, C-130, and C-141 aircraft. Events included airdrops of both equipment and personnel, ERO, assault takeoffs and landings, maintenance inspections, aerial delivery inspections, as well as Combat Control and Security Police marksmanship and a tactical exercise guarding a C-130 against a group of simulated terrorists. The XVIII Airborne Corps at Fort Bragg also supported the Rodeo by providing paratroops, equipment, and drop zones for the air drop events.

The following year the Rodeo was again held at Pope Air Force Base from 13 – 19 July. A total of 37 team participated in the 1980 event including four international teams from Australia, Canada, the Federal Republic of Germany, and the United Kingdom. The German team competed in the C-130 category flying Transall C-160 aircraft. The event was won by the 40th TAS commanded by Major Richard Mandas with Capt Robert Arnett, copilot, Capt Randall Hill, navigator, Sgt H. Clark, engineer and Sgt Ray Quinones, loadmasters. The team flew C-130E 70-1259 (Aerospace Chicken), Sgt. Jack Koeneman, Dedicated Crew Chief.

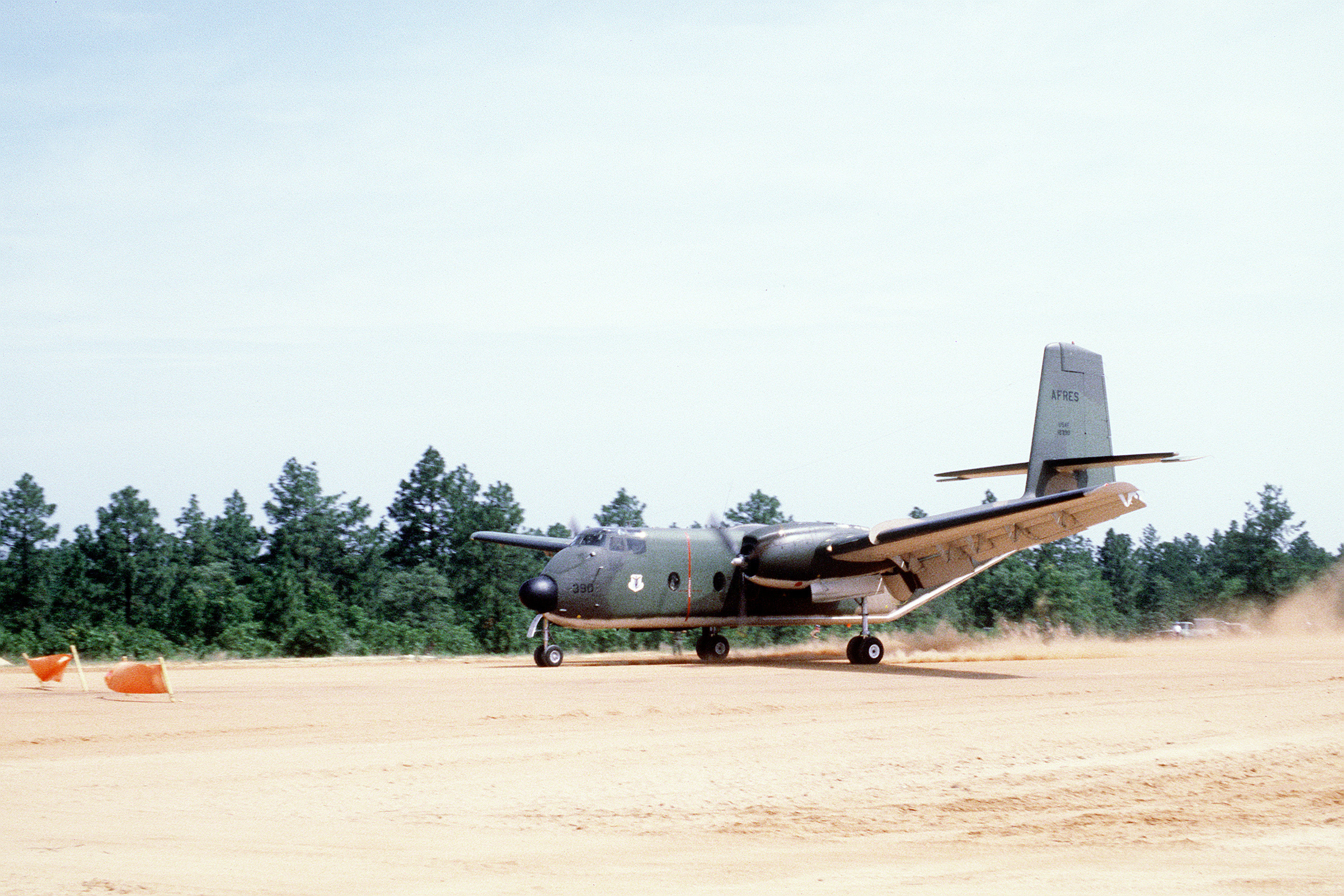
A 94th Airlift Wing C-7A during "Volant Rodeo '81".

Allied interaction was expanded during the 1981 Rodeo, held 7 – 13 June at Pope Air Force Base. Allied aircrews were given opportunities to fly in MAC aircraft and in at least one case MAC adopted British procedures, using copilots to assists the navigators during low level missions.

By this time the C-7 and C-123 airframes were being phased out of the inventory, so they did not compete in the 1982 Rodeo at Pope Air Force Base from 13 – 18 June. The 1982 Rodeo was also the first that saw an allied nation win the overall competition as Italy's 46th Air Brigade won the Best Wing Award.

The Rodeo format remained relatively unchanged over the subsequent four years. The 94th Tactical Airlift Wing became first Reserve unit to win the Best Wing Award in 1985 and the 136th Tactical Airlift Wing was the first Air National Guard unit to win best wing in 1986.

=== Airlift Rodeo ===
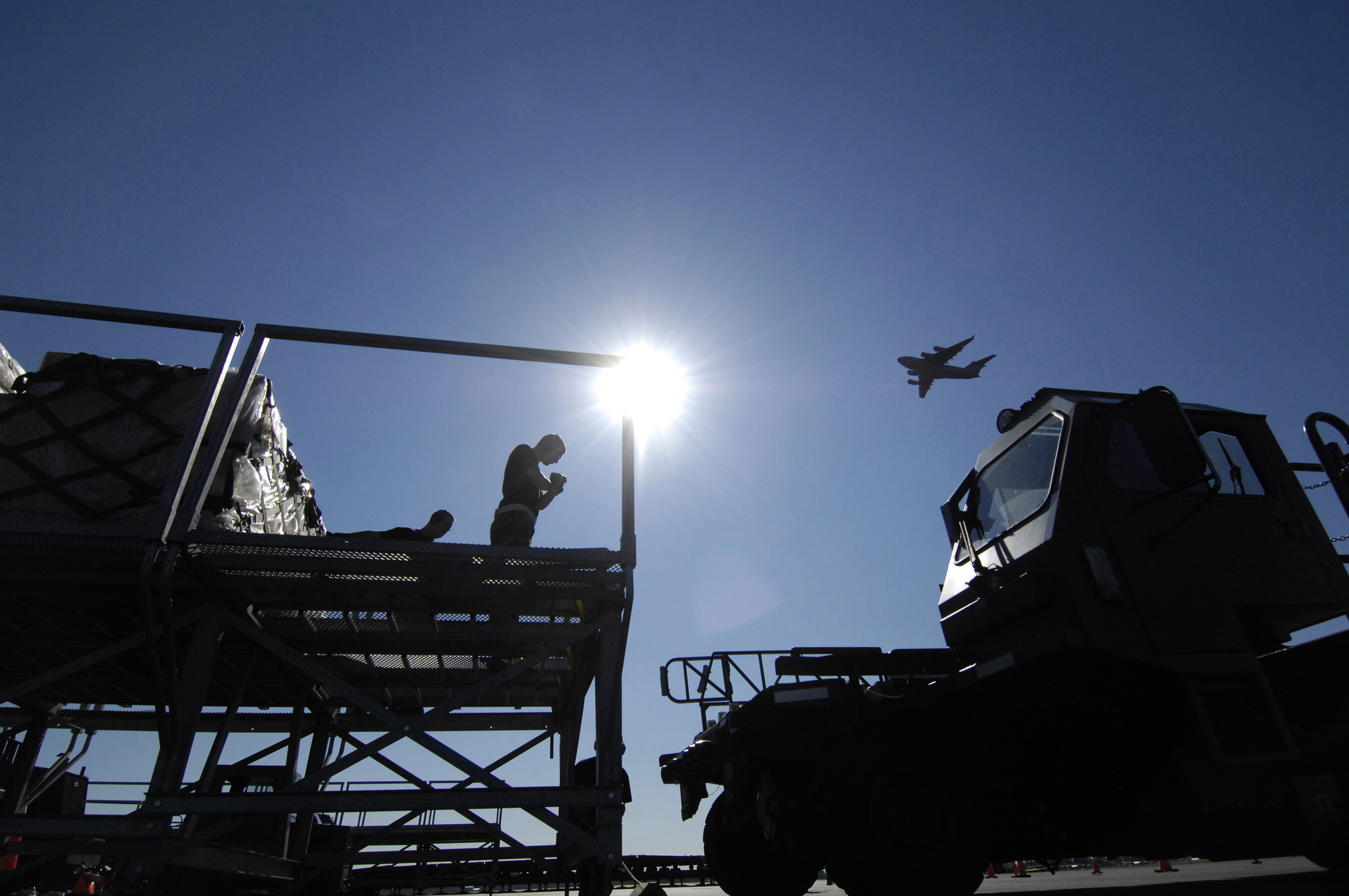
An aerial port team getting ready for a Rodeo event

The Rodeo competition was renamed Airlift Rodeo beginning in 1987 by the MAC commander General Duane Cassidy in an effort to more accurately reflect the purpose of the event. The roles of the maintenance, Security Police, and Combat Control teams also expanded in 1987. The latter two participated in overland infiltration event using Multiple Integrated Laser Engagement System (MILES) gear help to create realism, and the Combat Control teams conducted High Altitude-Low Opening (HALO) jumps and established drop zones. Additionally, comedian Bob Hope performed at Rodeo, filming a two-hour program for his 84th birthday. President Ronald Reagan and Secretary of the Air Force Edward Aldridge Jr. were also on hand for Bob Hope's performance.

No Rodeo was held in 1988 because of budget constraints. However, the Rodeo returned in 1989. This Rodeo was the first to showcase the airdrop capability of the C-5 Galaxy. The C-5 set a world record by dropping four M551 Sheridan light tanks and 73 paratroopers from the 82nd Airborne Division totaling 190,346 pounds.

=== Air Mobility Rodeo ===
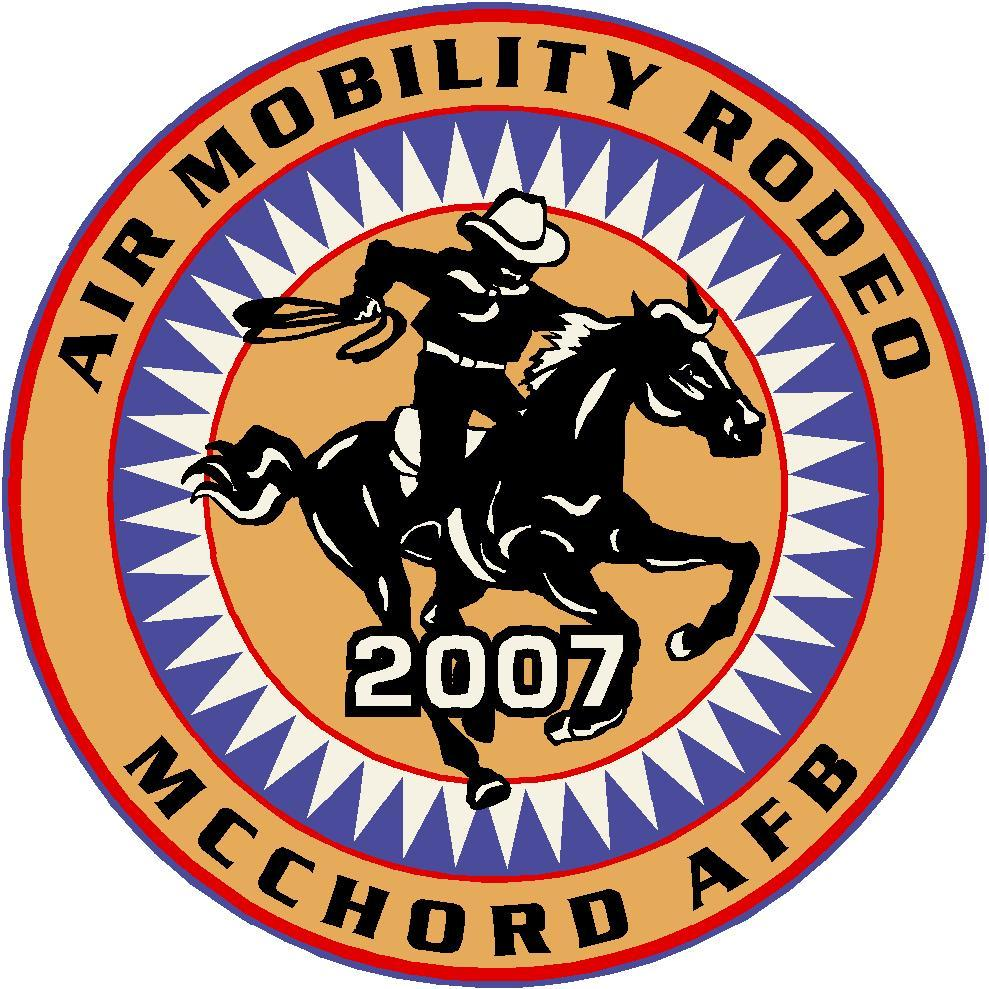
2007 Air Mobility RODEO Logo for McChord AFB.

No competition was held from 2001–2004 because of the increased operations tempo as a result of the Global War on Terror.

The 2005, 2007, 2009, and 2011 Rodeos were held at McChord Air Force Base, Washington. At the 2007 Rodeo more than 40 teams and 2,500 personnel from around the world participated. At the 2011 Rodeo, The 97th Air Mobility Wing from Altus Air Force Base took top honors as the best Air Mobility Wing. In March 2013, it was decided that years Air Mobility Rodeo would be cancelled due to budgetary reasons.

=== List of Winners ===
- CARP Rodeo
  - 1962–1502d Air Transport Wing
  - Major Joe Lodrige and his crew with the 1502nd Air Transport Wing from Hickam AFB, Hawaii, won the first active-duty Rodeo competition in 1962.
  - 1963 – 62d Air Transport Wing
  - 1964–1608th Air Transport Wing
- Combat Airlift Competition
  - 1969 – 63d Military Airlift Wing
  - 1970 – 436th Military Airlift Wing
  - 1971 – 63d Military Airlift Wing
  - 1972 – 436th Military Airlift Wing
- Volant Rodeo

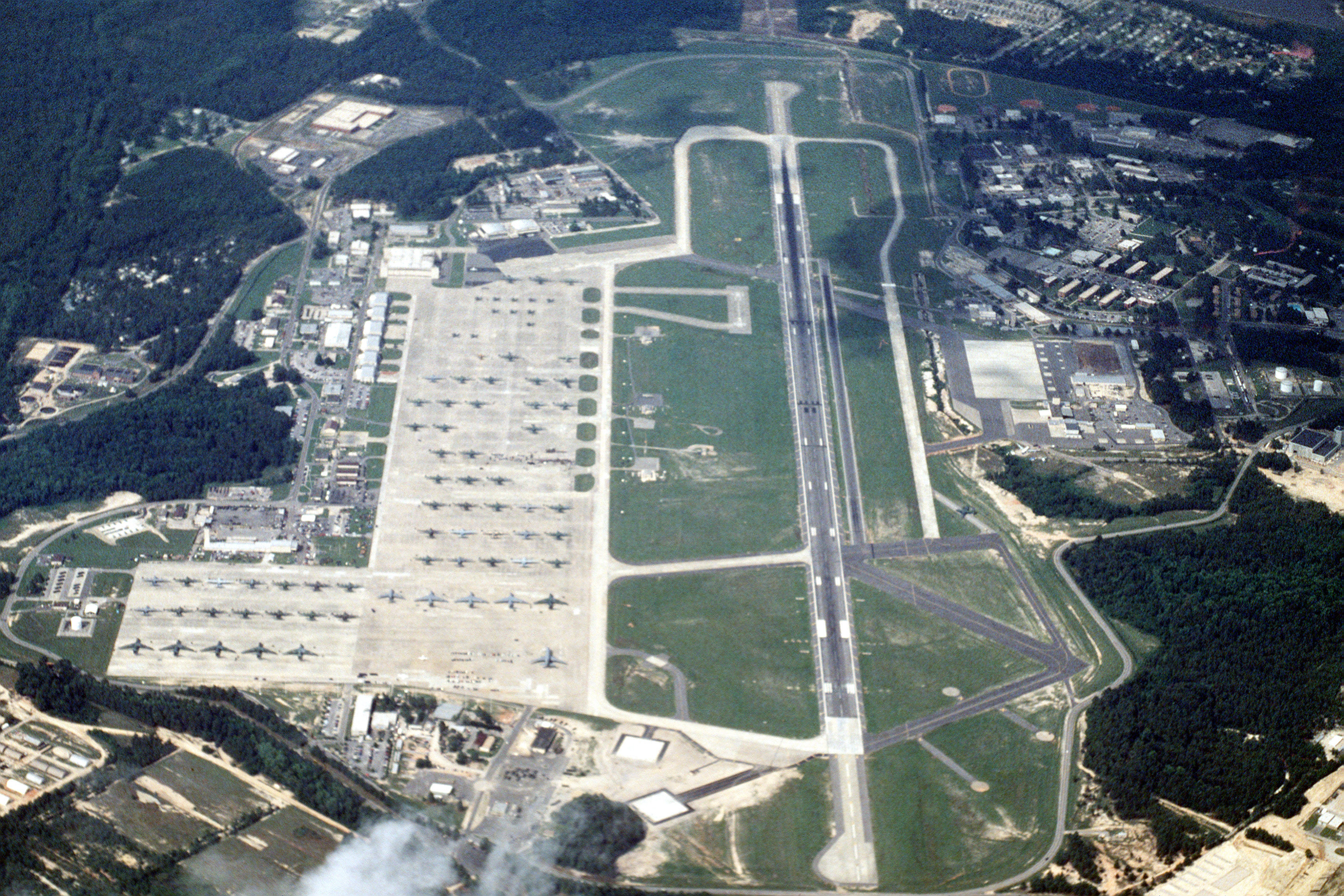
Pope Air Force Base at the state of Air Mobility Rodeo '92

  - 1979 – 443d Military Airlift Wing
  - 1980 – 317th Tactical Airlift Wing
  - 1981 – 314th Tactical Airlift Wing
  - 1982 – 50°Gruppo -46^ Brigata Aerea - Italian Air Force
  - 1983 – 314th Tactical Airlift Wing
  - 1984 – 50°Gruppo -46^ Brigata Aerea - Italian Air Force
  - 1985 – 94th Tactical Airlift Wing
  - 1986 – 145th Tactical Airlift Group North Carolina Air National Guard
- Airlift Rodeo
  - 1987 – LTG 62 German Air Force
  - 1989 – Royal Australian Air Force
  - 1990 – 63d Military Airlift Wing
- Air Mobility Rodeo

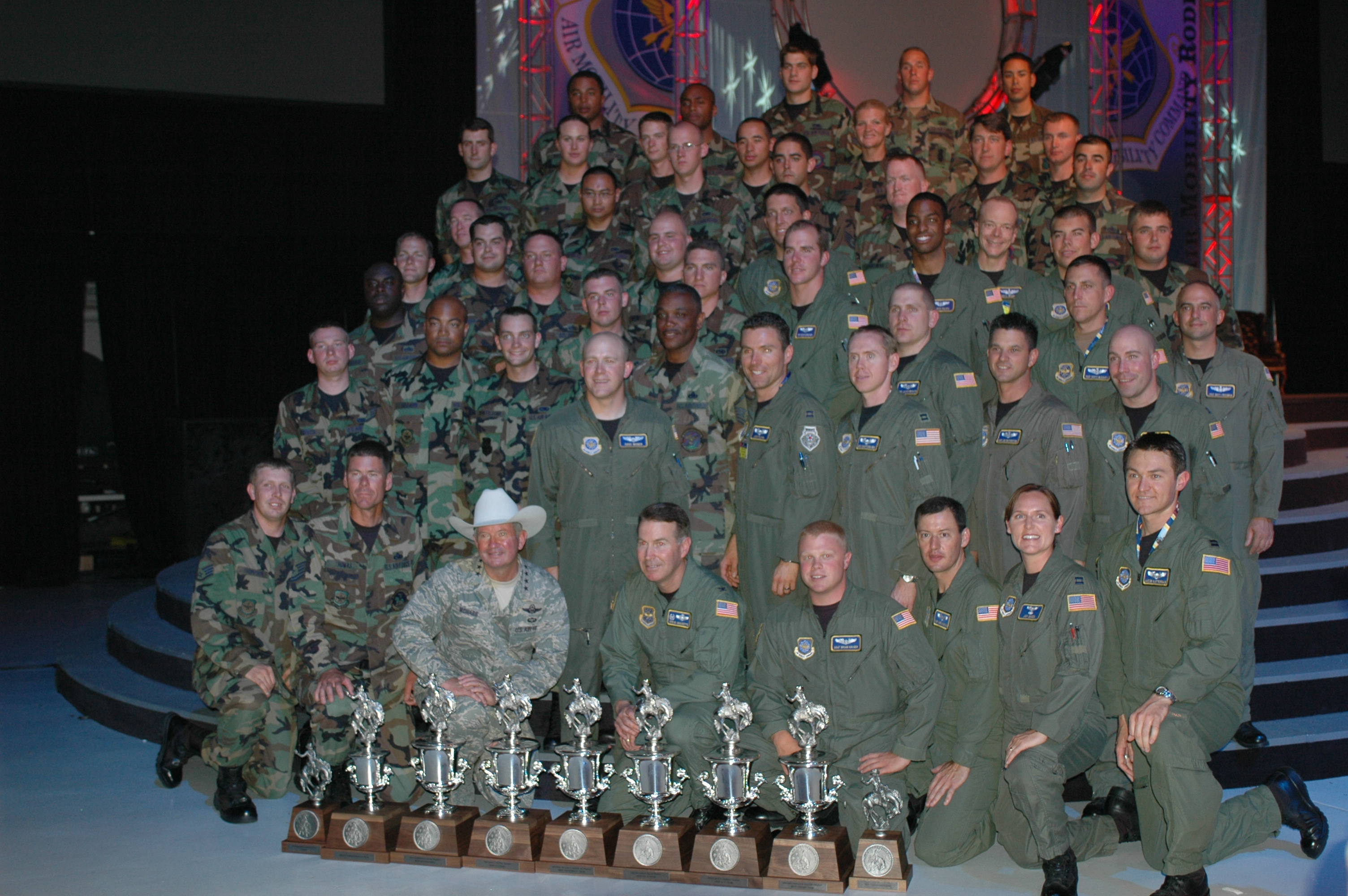
The 60 AMW team celebrating their win with General Duncan McNabb

  - 1992 – 446th Airlift Wing
  - 1993 - 440th Airlift Wing
  - 1994 – 19th Air Refueling Wing
  - 1996 – 19th Air Refueling Wing
  - 1998 – 3d Wing
  - 2000 – 6th Air Mobility Wing
  - 2005 – 6th Air Mobility Wing
  - 2007 – 60th Air Mobility Wing
  - 2009 – 62d Airlift Wing
  - 2011 - 314th Airlift Wing
- Best Foreign Team
  - 1983 - 501 Squadron - Bisontes, Portuguese Air Force
  - 1987 - LTG 62, German Air Force
  - 1992 - 501 Squadron - Bisontes, Portuguese Air Force

== 2007 Participants ==
=== United States Air Force ===
- 6th Air Mobility Wing
- 15th Airlift Wing
- 18th Wing
- 19th Air Refueling Group
- 19th Airlift Wing
- 22d Air Refueling Wing
- 43d Airlift Wing
- 48th Flying Training Squadron
- 60th Air Mobility Wing
- 62d Airlift Wing
- 71st Flying Training Squadron
- 73d Special Operations Squadron
- 86th Airlift Wing
- 86th Flying Training Squadron
- 89th Airlift Wing
- 92d Air Refueling Wing
- 97th Air Mobility Wing
- 99th Flying Training Squadron
- 100th Air Refueling Wing
- 109th Airlift Wing
- 121st Air Refueling Wing
- 143d Airlift Wing
- 305th Air Mobility Wing
- 314th Airlift Wing
- 317th Airlift Group
- 319th Air Refueling Wing
- 374th Airlift Wing
- 375th Airlift Wing
- 436th Airlift Wing
- 437th Airlift Wing
- 439th Airlift Wing
- 446th Airlift Wing
- 514th Air Mobility Wing
- 615th Contingency Response Wing
- 715th Air Mobility Operations Group
- 910th Airlift Wing
- 916th Air Refueling Wing

=== United States Marine Corps ===
- Marine Aerial Refueler Transport Squadron 234
- Marine Aerial Refueler Transport Squadron 352
- Marine Aerial Refueler Transport Squadron 452

=== International Competitors ===
- Belgium
- Brazil
- Germany
- Netherlands
- Pakistan
- Saudi Arabia
- South Korea
- Turkey
- Portugal
- United Arab Emirates

=== International Observers ===
- Algeria
- Australia
- Argentina
- Botswana
- Canada
- Chile
- Colombia
- Denmark
- Finland
- Greece
- India
- Indonesia
- Kuwait
- Malaysia
- New Zealand
- Nigeria
- Oman
- Poland
- Romania
- Switzerland
- Ukraine
- United Kingdom

== 2009 Award Winners ==
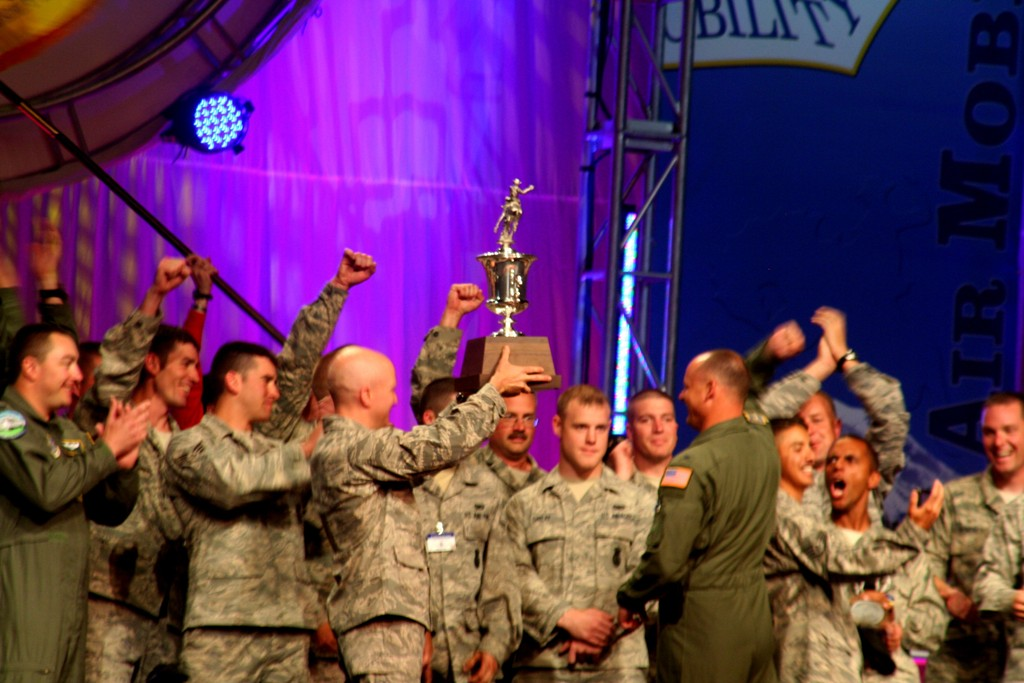
62d Airlift Wing celebrating their Rodeo win

A list of 2009 winners:

- Best Air Mobility Team: 62d Airlift Wing, McChord AFB, Washington
- Knuckle Buster Award: 374th Airlift Wing, C-130, Yokota Air Base, Japan
- Best Aerial Port Team: 19th Airlift Wing, Little Rock Air Force Base, Arkansas
- Best Contingency Response Team: 621st Contingency Response Wing, McGuire AFB, New Jersey
- Best Security Forces Team: 446th Airlift Wing, McChord AFB, Washington
- Best International Team: Republic of Korea
- Best Aeromedical Evacuation Team: 86th Airlift Wing, Ramstein AB, Germany
- Best Aerial Refueling Team (Tanker): 22d Air Refueling Wing, KC-135, McConnell AFB, Kansas
- Best C-5 Team: 60th Air Mobility Wing, Travis AFB, California
- Best C-130/C-160 Team: 19th Airlift Wing, Little Rock AFB, Arkansas
- Best C-17 Team: 62d Airlift Wing, McChord AFB, Washington
- Best KC-10 Team: 60th Air Mobility Wing, Travis AFB, California
- Best KC-135 Team: 916th Air Refueling Wing, Seymour-Johnson AFB, North Carolina
- Best Air-land Team: 60th Air Mobility Wing, Travis AFB, California
- Best Tanker Team: 97th Air Mobility Wing, Altus AFB, Oklahoma
- Best Airdrop Team: 62d Airlift Wing, McChord AFB, Washington
- Best Aircrew Team: 103 Squadron, IDF team, Nevatim AB, Israel
