= 501 Squadron =

501 Squadron or 501st Squadron may refer to:

- No. 501 Squadron RAF, United Kingdom
- 501 Squadron (Portugal)
- 501 Squadron, Air Force Mobile Deployment Wing SAAF, South Africa
- 501st Tactical Reconnaissance Squadron (JASDF), Japan
- 501st Aero Squadron, Air Service, United States Army, see list of American aero squadrons
- 501st Bombardment Squadron, United States Air Force
- VMFAT-501, United States Marine Corps
