= 62nd Airlift Wing =

Unit of US Air Force, part of Air Mobility Command

62nd Airlift Wing

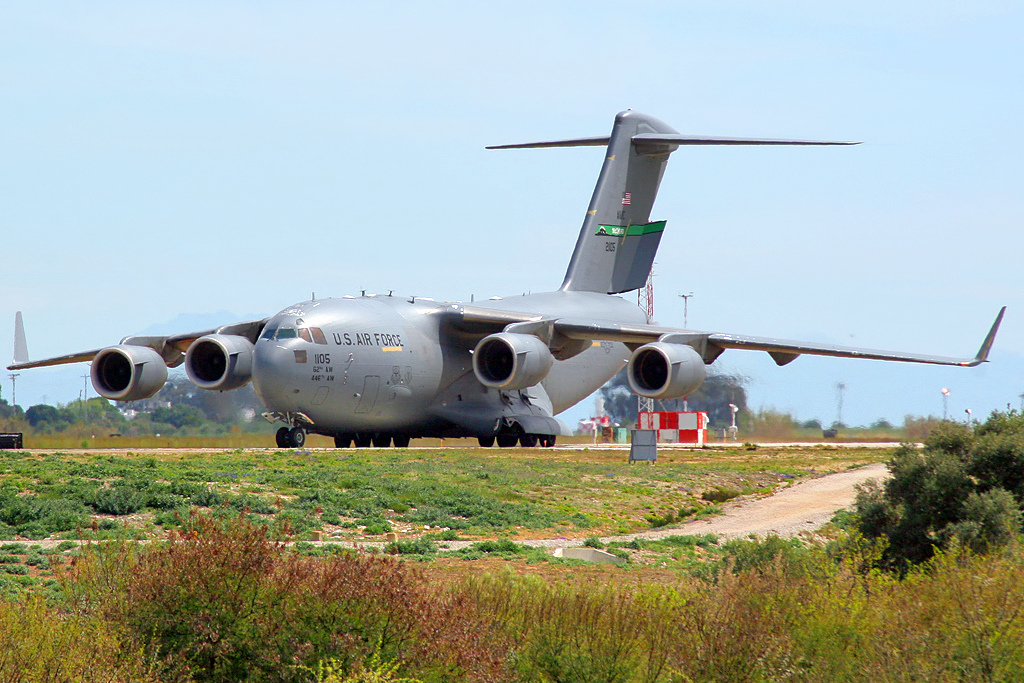
- 62nd Airlift Wing C-17A Globemaster III
- Active: 1947–1948; 1948–1950; 1951–present
- Country: United States
- Role: Airlift
- Size: ~2300 Airmen
- Part of: Air Mobility Command
- Garrison/HQ: McChord Air Force Base, Washington
- Motto: In Omnia Paratus (Latin for 'In All Things Ready') Combat Airlift
- Engagements: Armed Forces Expeditionary Grenada, 1983

- Decorations: Meritorious Unit Award Air Force Outstanding Unit Award (12x)

Commanders
- Current commander: Colonel Jessica L. Regni
- Notable commanders: Duncan McNabb; George Scratchley Brown

Insignia
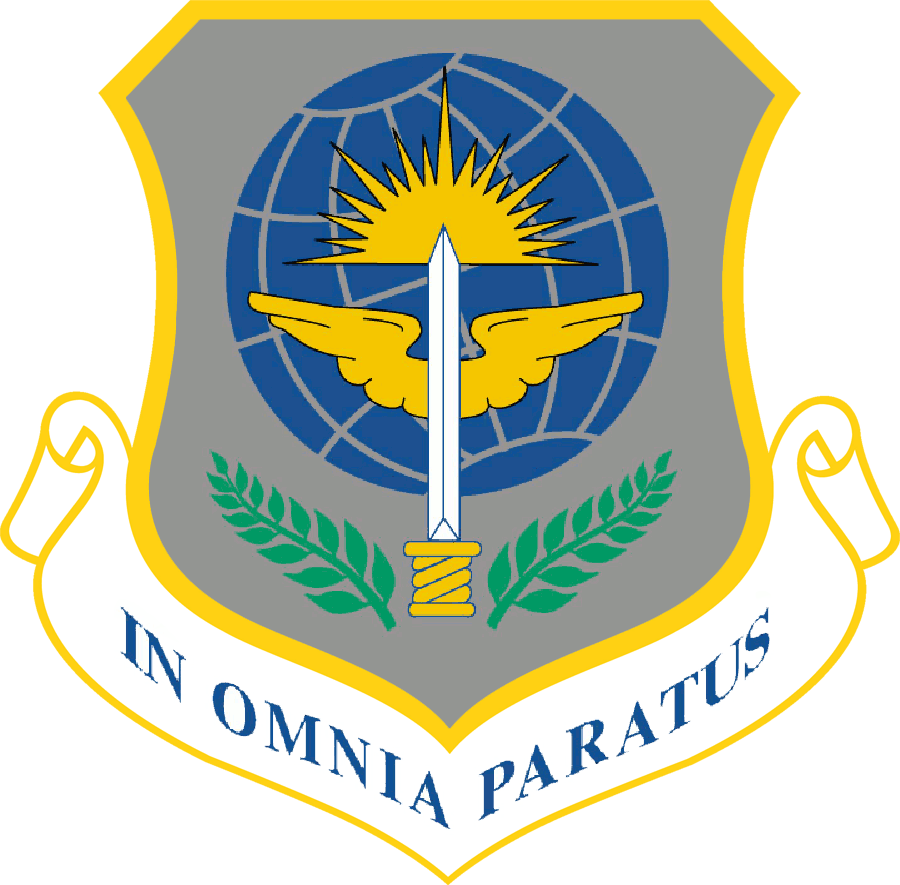
- 62nd Airlift Wing emblem (Note: Approved 17 November 1969. Description: Gray, a globe with axis bendwise Azure gridlined of the first [color] above in base two arched olive branches, one to dexter and one to sinister vert, overall in pale a sword with blade Argent, hilt Or, the blade winged of the last [color], the point of the blade surmounting a sunburst of the like [color], all within a diminished bordure Or.)

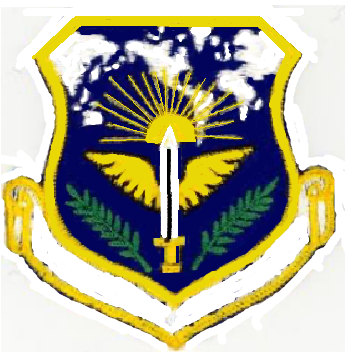
- 62nd Troop Carrier Wing emblem (Note: Approved 18 August 1955)

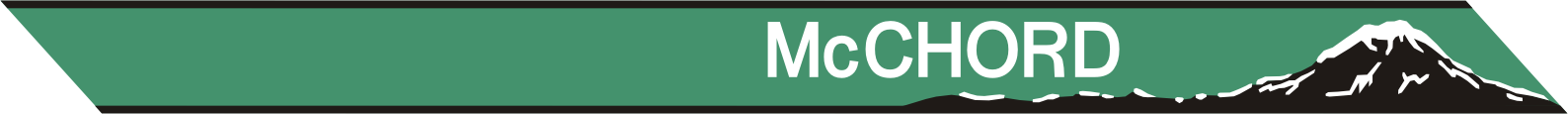
- 62nd Airlift Wing tail stripe

The 62nd Airlift Wing, officially 62d Airlift Wing, is a wing of the United States Air Force stationed at McChord AFB, Joint Base Lewis–McChord, Washington. It is assigned to the Eighteenth Air Force of Air Mobility Command and is active duty host wing on McChord. The wing is composed of more than 2,200 active duty military and civilian personnel. It is tasked with supporting worldwide combat and humanitarian airlift contingencies. Aircraft of the 62nd fly worldwide, conducting airdrop training; it also carries out the Antarctic resupply missions.

== Units ==
- 62d Operations Group (62 OG)

4th Airlift Squadron (4 AS)
7th Airlift Squadron (7 AS)
8th Airlift Squadron (8 AS)
62d Operations Support Squadron (62 OSS)

- 62d Maintenance Group (62 MXG)

62d Aerial Port Squadron (62 APS)

- 627th Air Base Group (627 ABG) )
- 62d Medical Squadron (62 MDS)
- 62d Comptroller Squadron (62 CPTS)

== History ==
The 62d Airlift Wing was first constituted as the 62nd Troop Carrier Wing on 28 July 1947, at McChord Field, Washington. It owes its numerical designation, and its first seven years of history prior to 1947, to the present day 62d Operations Group.

=== Cold War ===
After the wing was established in 1947 it conducted troop carrier operations, tactical exercises, and humanitarian missions. The wing operated from McChord Air Force Base, Washington until late 1951 when it moved to Larson Air Force Base. From Larson the wing routinely performed troop carrier, air transport, and humanitarian missions on a global scale: flying mail to Japan for U.S. troops in Korea in 1952; bringing medical supplies to the flooded areas of Pakistan in 1954; and transporting French troops and equipment from France to Indochina as part of Operation Bali-Hai from April–May 1954. The wing airlifted radar equipment and supplies to help construct the Distant Early Warning Line in northern Alaska and Canada from 1955–1956, and thereafter periodically resupplied DEW Line stations. During the International Geophysical Year 1957–1958, and subsequently through 1962 the wing supported scientific stations in the Arctic Ocean by airlanding and airdropping supplies on the drifting ice. It helped transport United Nations troops and supplies to the Congo in 1960 ("Operation New Tape"). In 1963 the wing assumed responsibility for worldwide airlift of nuclear weapons and associated equipment, continuing this mission through early 1971. It also assumed airlift of Minuteman missiles from depots to operating sites in April 1971. In 1972 it supported Presidential trips to China and the Soviet Union. From 12 February to 1 April 1973 the wing transported former prisoners of war from North Vietnam to the Philippines and the United States. That same year it transported United Nations troops from Indonesia to Israel and Egypt as part of a peacekeeping effort.

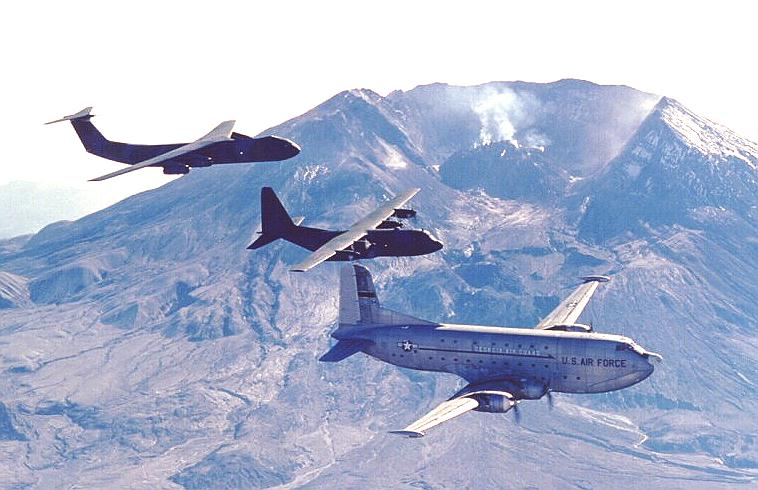
C-124, C-130, and C-141 with Mount St. Helens in the background

In the summer of 1975, the wing assumed control of the 36th Tactical Airlift Squadron (36 TAS) and their C-130E aircraft, which transferred from Langley AFB, Virginia following the transfer of all Lockheed C-130 Hercules aircraft from Tactical Air Command (TAC) to Military Airlift Command (MAC), and the disestablishment of the 316th Tactical Airlift Wing at Langley to make way for the arrival of the 1st Tactical Fighter Wing (1 TFW) and their F-15A and F-15B aircraft. From October 1975 to October 1977, the 62 MAW maintained a detachment of C-130Es in the Panama Canal Zone to support USAF needs in Central and South America. The 62nd airlifted troops and supplies during invasion of Grenada and airlifted university students to safety from, October–November 1983. During 1988 62 AW aircraft were used to transport inspectors to the Soviet Union under terms of the Intermediate-Range Nuclear Forces Treaty. 62 AW aircraft were also used that year to transport firefighters and supplies to Wyoming to fight major forest fires in Yellowstone National Park. It participated in the airdrop of heavy equipment and personnel during military action in Panama, 20 December 1989. During Operation Desert Shield the 62nd airlifted personnel and equipment to Southwest Asia and operated airlift control elements at Zaragoza, Spain, to direct cargo and personnel destined for Southwest Asia from, August 1990 – March 1991. Additionally, during 1991, 62 AW personnel and aircraft facilitated the evacuation of Clark Air Base and Subic Bay Naval Station following the eruption of Mount Pinatubo in the Philippines.

In addition, some activities of the 62nd Military Airlift Wing did not take place at McChord AFB. For instance, one unit that belonged to the 62nd MAW—the 602 Military Airlift Support Squadron (MASS) – was assigned to Elmendorf Air Force Base during the rapid buildup of forces in Vietnam. The 602 MASS supported the flights of C-141 and C-130 aircraft from bases in the continental USA along the great circle route to Japan and Southeast Asia (SEA) by providing refueling services and basic mechanical maintenance for aircraft while en route to and from SEA. The 602 MASS was in operation at Elmendorf around the mid-1960s to about the end of America's involvement in Vietnam.

=== End of the Century ===
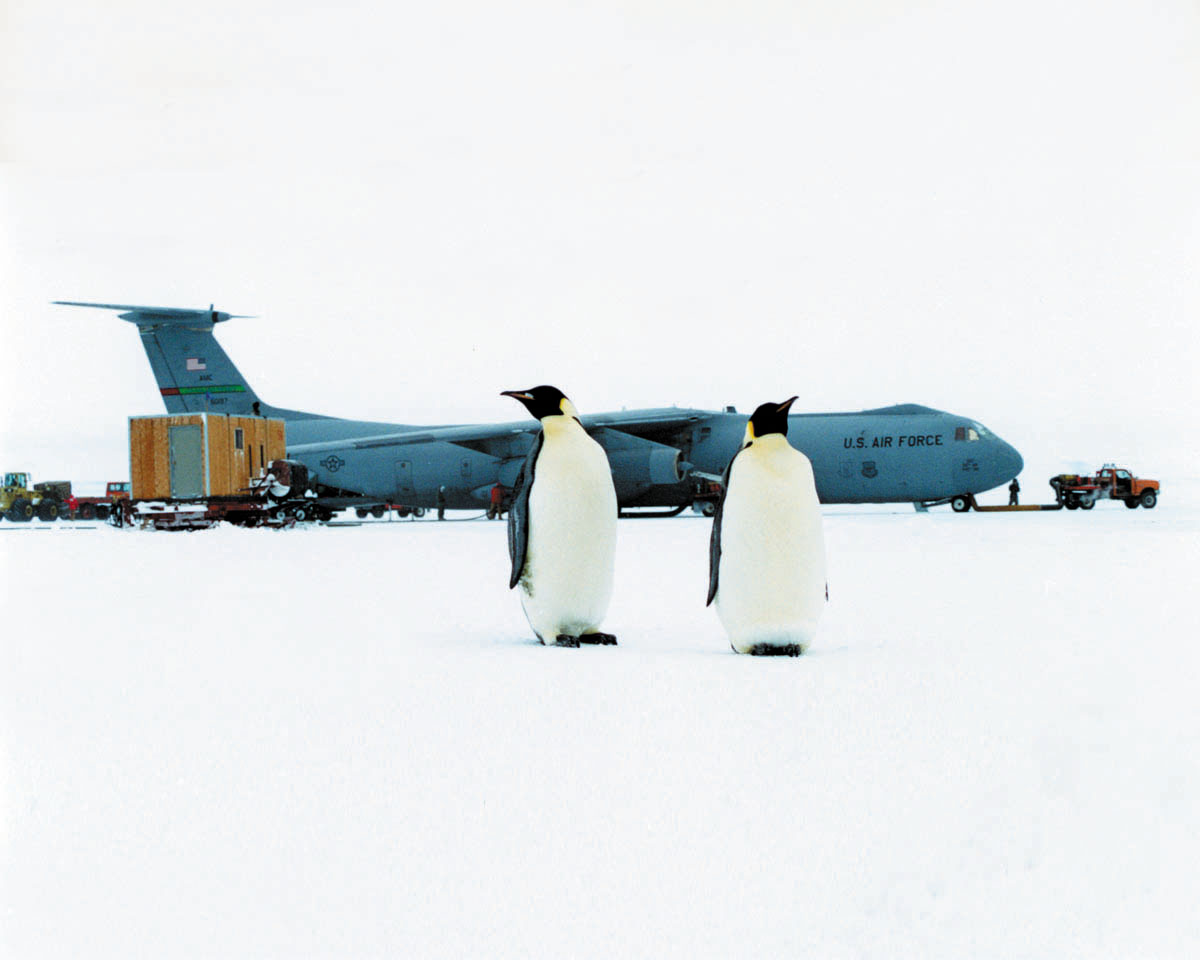
C-141 participating in Operation Deep Freeze

In 1992, 62 AW flew relief mission to Guam following Typhoon Omar, Hawaii following Hurricane Iniki, Florida following Hurricane Andrew, as well as Somalia, the former Yugoslavia, and the former Soviet Union. In 1993, the 62 AW divested itself of the then-redesignated 36th Airlift Squadron (36 AS), transferring the squadron and its C-130E aircraft to the 374th Airlift Wing (374 AW) at Yokota AB, Japan. In 1994, the 62 AW dispatched personnel and aircraft to deliver equipment and supplies in support of Operation Support Hope in Rwanda. During 1995, the 62 AW deployed personnel and aircraft to the U.S. Virgin Islands following Hurricane Marilyn and to Bosnia in support of Operation Joint Endeavor. 62 AW personnel delivered relief supplies to Ho Chi Minh City, Vietnam following torrential rains and flooding spawned by Typhoon Linda in 1997. In 1998, the 62 AW delivered relief supplies to Guam following Super Typhoon Paka, to Papua New Guinea following a tsunami, to Changsha, China following severe flooding, and to Nairobi, Kenya following the bombing of the U.S. Embassy there.

=== 2009 Air Mobility Rodeo ===
In 2009 the 62 AW won the Best Air Mobility Wing at the Air Mobility Rodeo, a biennial, international airlift competition hosted by the United States Air Force Air Mobility Command. In addition to taking the top prize, the 62 AW also won Best C-17 Team and Best Airdrop Team. Beyond the major awards, sub-category awards won include Best Aerial Port Challenge Course Team, Best Joint Inspection Team, Best C-17 Low-level Airdrop Crew, Best C-17 Aircrew, and Best C-17 Post-flight Team.

=== Recent activities ===
Following the September 11 attacks in 2001 the wing flew missions supporting the War in Afghanistan (2001–2021) (Operation Enduring Freedom), and homeland defence activities under Operation Noble Eagle. In 2003 the wing assisted in the troop buildup leading up to the 2003 invasion of Iraq (Operation Iraqi Freedom) and conducted the airdrop of the 173rd Airborne Brigade into northern Iraq at the beginning of the war. In late 2004 and early 2005 the 62 AW was dispatched with emergency relief supplies to areas throughout Southeast Asia in response to the tsunami that struck on 26 December 2004.

On 8 May 2020, the 62 AW saluted the healthcare workers at the forefront in the fight against COVID-19 by performing a 2.5-hour C-17 Globemaster III two-ship formation flyover throughout Washington State's Puget Sound Region.

In August 2021, aircraft from 62 AW joined efforts to evacuate Americans and Afghan Allies from Kabul during the fall of the Afghan government to the Taliban, during the 2021 Taliban offensive and the subsequent Fall of Kabul.

== Lineage ==
- Established as 62nd Troop Carrier Wing on 28 July 1947

Organized on 15 August 1947
Redesignated: 62nd Troop Carrier Wing, Medium, on 22 August 1948
Redesignated: 62nd Troop Carrier Wing, Heavy, on 12 October 1949
Inactivated on 1 June 1950

- Activated on 17 September 1951

Redesignated: 62nd Air Transport Wing, Heavy, on 1 January 1965
Redesignated: 62nd Military Airlift Wing on 8 January 1966
Redesignated: 62d Airlift Wing on 1 December 1991.

- Designated 62d Air Expeditionary Wing in September 2001 when wing elements deployed to combat areas.

=== Assignments ===
- Twelfth Air Force, 15 August 1947
- Fourth Air Force, 10 December 1948 – 1 June 1950
- Eighteenth Air Force, 17 September 1951
- Twenty-Second Air Force, 1 July 1957
- Fifteenth Air Force, 1 July 1993
- Eighteenth Air Force, 1 October 2003–present
- Air Mobility Command when wing elements deployed to combat areas any time after 11 September 2001.

=== Components ===
Wings

- 302d Troop Carrier Wing: attached 27 June 1949 – 5 May 1950

Groups

- 61st Troop Carrier Group: attached 21 November 1952 – 24 August 1954
- 62nd Troop Carrier (later, 62 Operations) Group: 15 August 1947 – 1 June 1950 (detached 2 May – 1 June 1950); 1 October 1951 – 15 January 1960; 1 December 1991–present

Squadrons

- 4th Troop Carrier (later, 4 Air Transport; 4 Military Airlift; 4 Airlift) Squadron: attached 8–14 January 1960, assigned 15 January 1960 – 1 December 1991
- 7th Troop Carrier (later, 7 Air Transport; 7 Military Airlift) Squadron: attached 8–14 January 1960, assigned 15 January 1960 – 22 December 1969
- 8th Troop Carrier (later, 8 Air Transport; 8 Military Airlift) Squadron: attached 8–14 January 1960, assigned 15 January 1960 – 1 December 1991.
- 10th Airlift Squadron: 1 October 2003 – 6 December 2016
- 19th Air Transport (later 19th Military Airlift) Squadron: 1 July 1963 – 22 December 1969
- 28th Air Transport (later 28th Military Airlift) Squadron: 1 July 1963 – 22 December 1969
- 36th Tactical Airlift (later, 36 Military Airlift) Squadron: 1 July 1975 – 1 December 1991.

=== Stations ===
- McChord Field (later, McChord AFB), Washington, 15 August 1947 – 1 June 1950; 17 September 1951
- Larson AFB, Washington, 21 April 1952
- McChord Air Force Base (Later became part of Joint Base Lewis-McChord), Washington, 13 June 1960–present

=== Aircraft ===
- C-82, 1947–1950
- C-54, 1949–1950
- C-124, 1951–1969
- C-54, 1952
- C-141, 1966–2002
- C-130, 1975–1989
- C-17, 1999–present

=== Operations ===
- Operation Deep Freeze
- Operation Iraqi Freedom
- Operation Enduring Freedom
- Joint Task Force Katrina
- Operation Urgent Fury
- Operation Desert Shield
- Operation Desert Storm
- Operation Just Cause
- Operation Support Hope
- Operation Joint Endeavor
- Operation Noble Eagle
- Operation Enduring Freedom
- Operation Iraqi Freedom
- Operation Northern Delay
- Operation Unified Assistance

== Unit shields ==
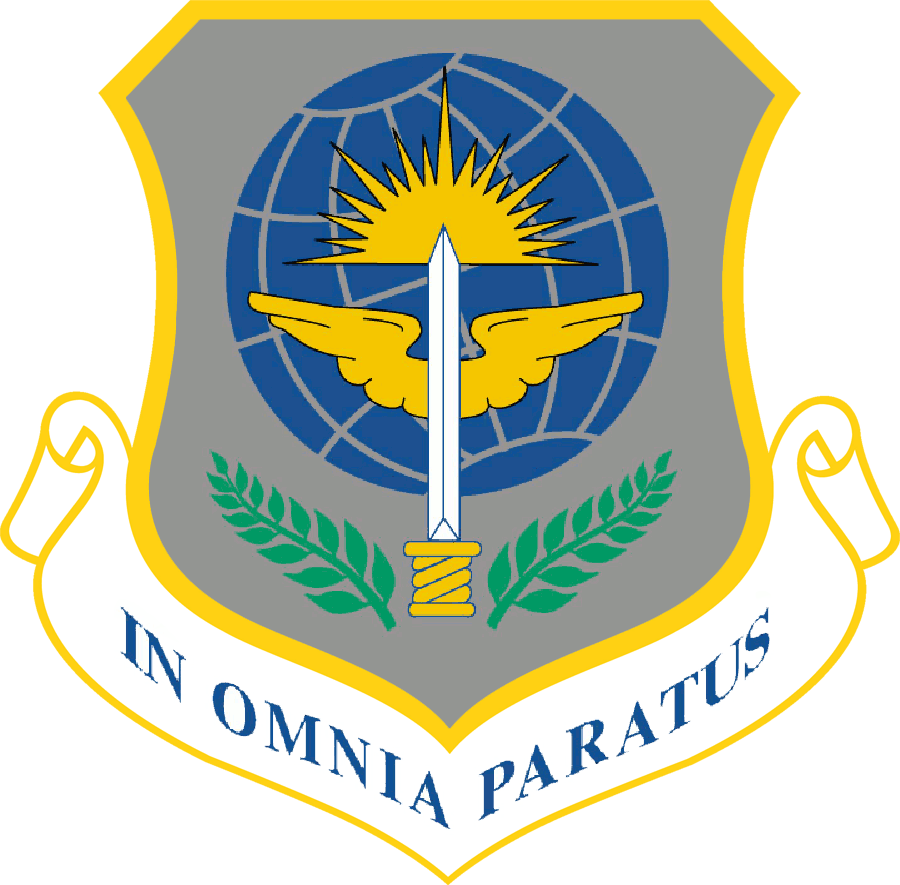
62 AW

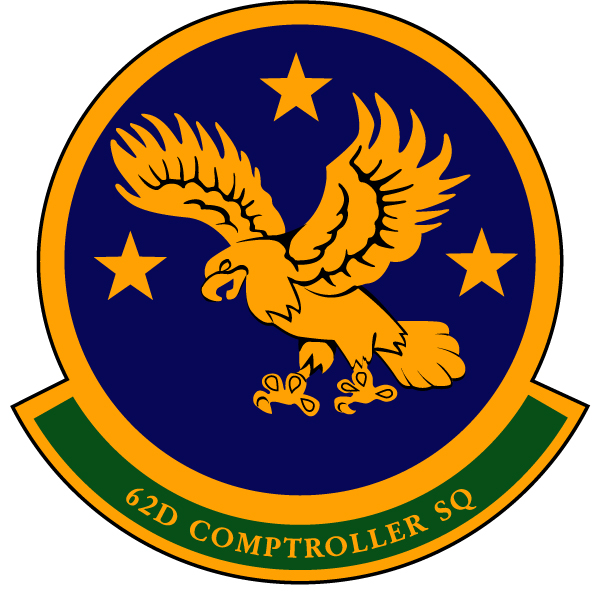
62 CPTS

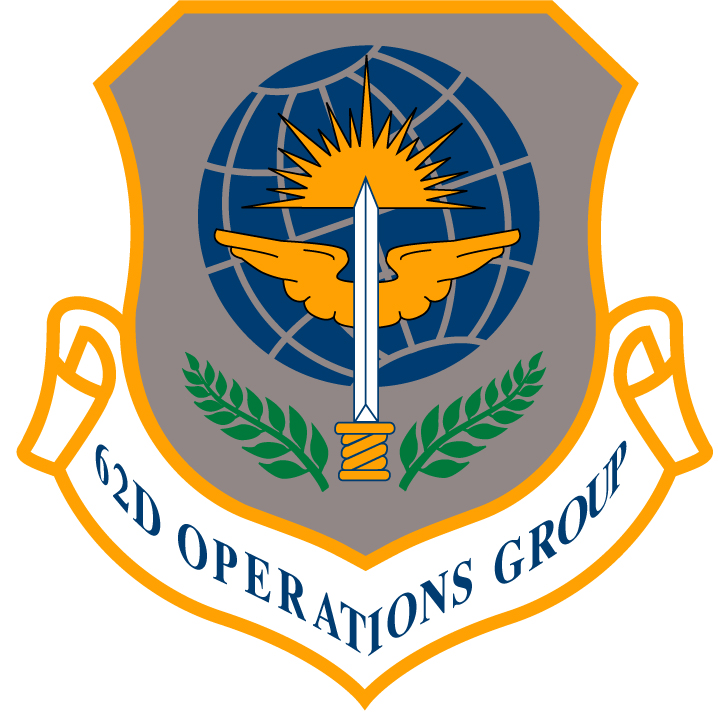
62 OG

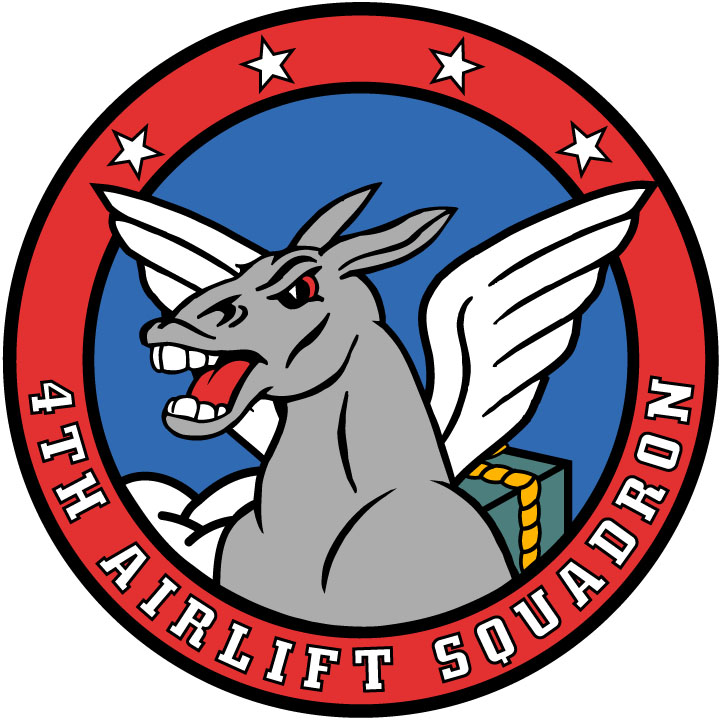
4 AS

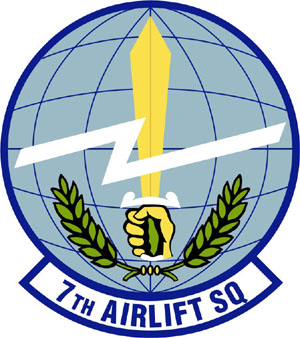
7 AS

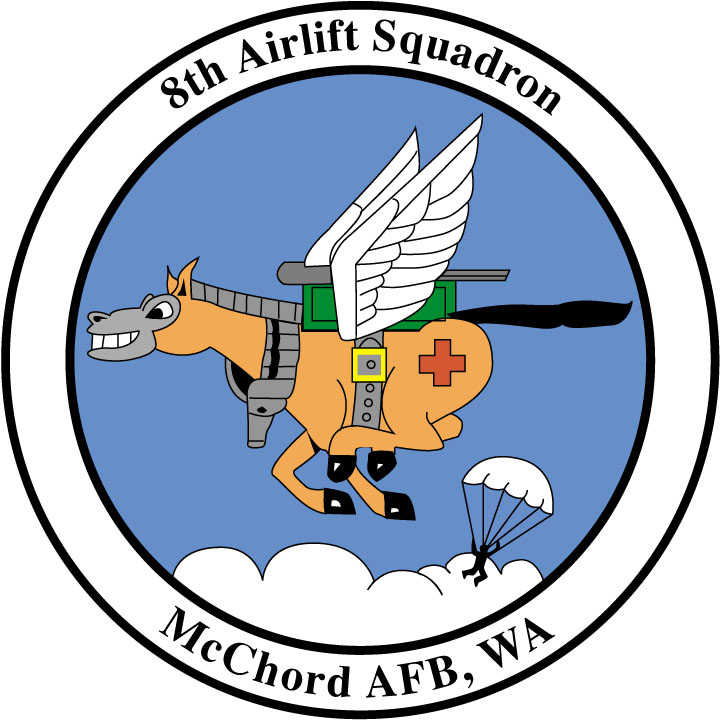
8 AS

10 AS

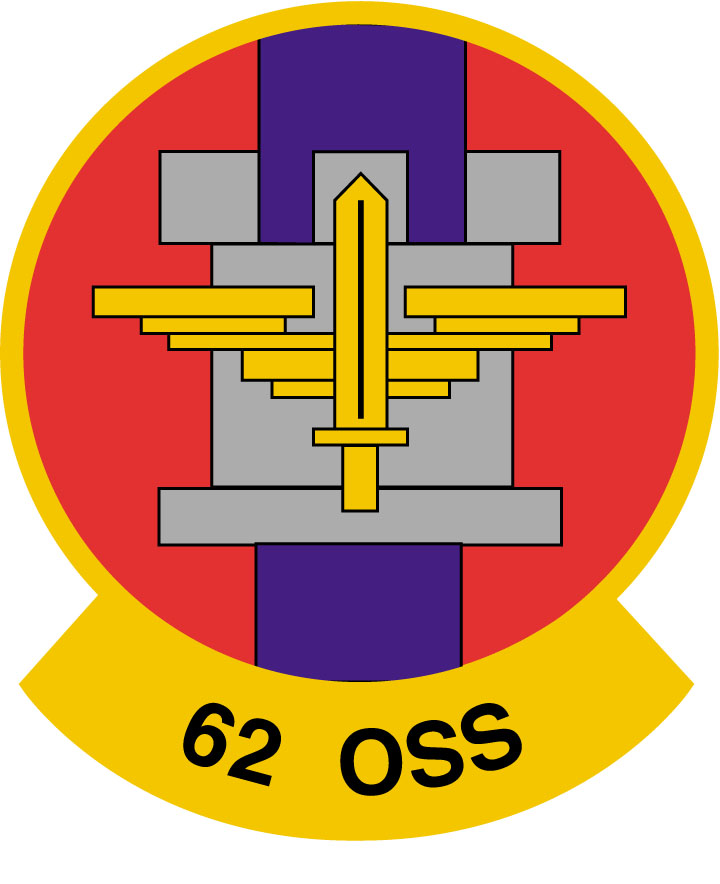
62 OSS

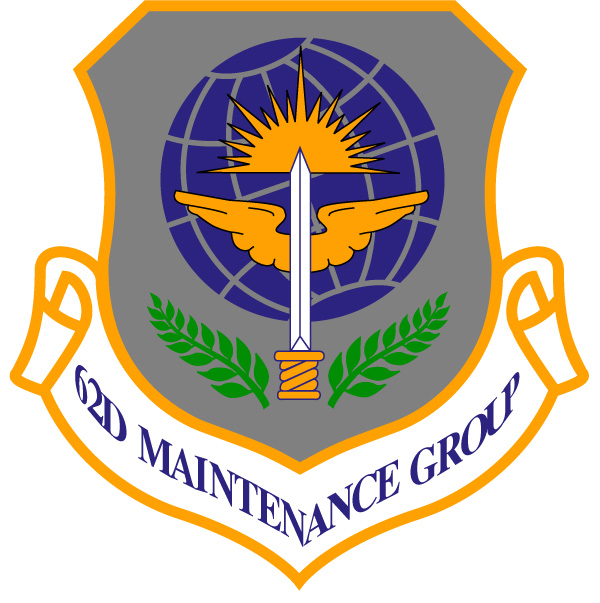
62 MXG

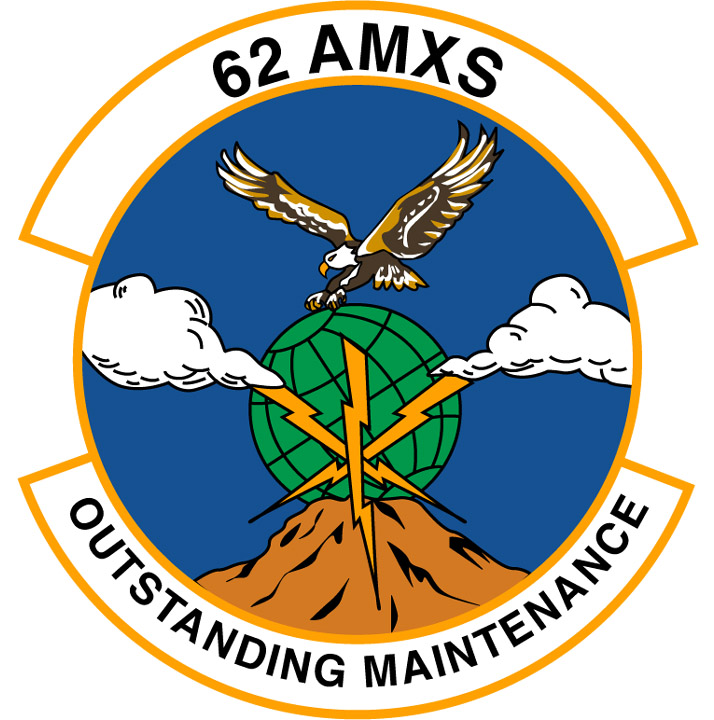
62 AMXS

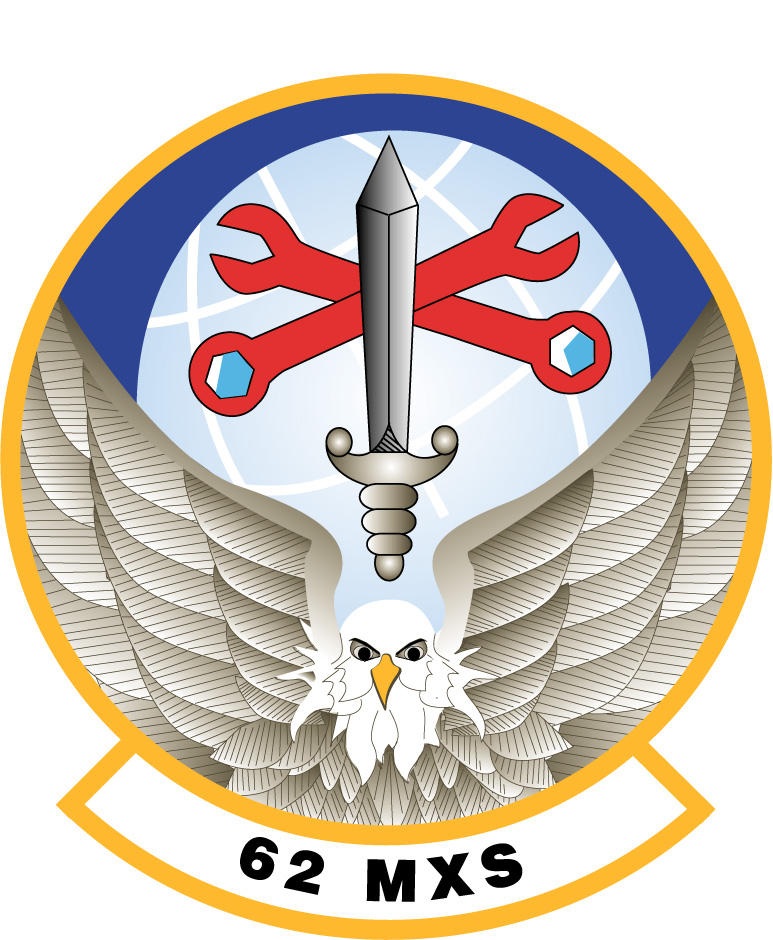
62 MXS

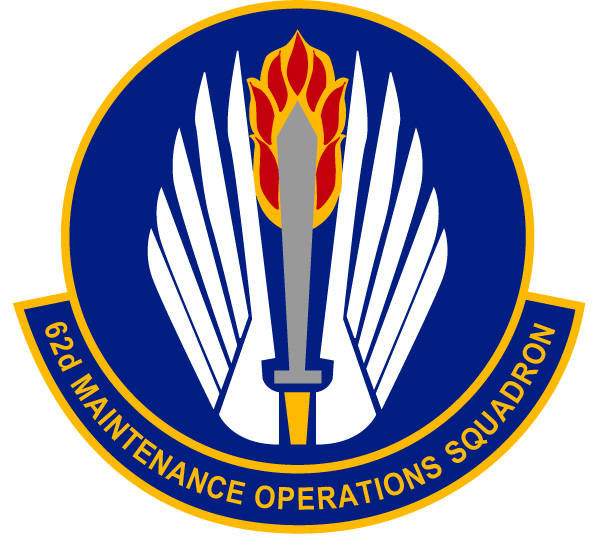
62 MOS

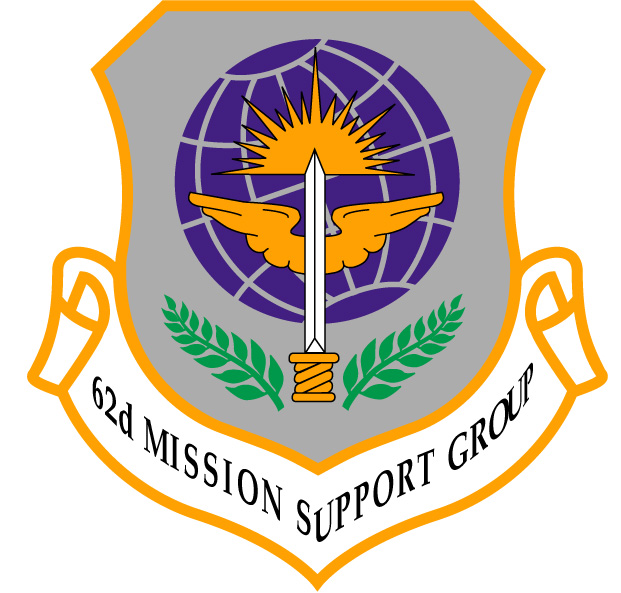
62 MSG

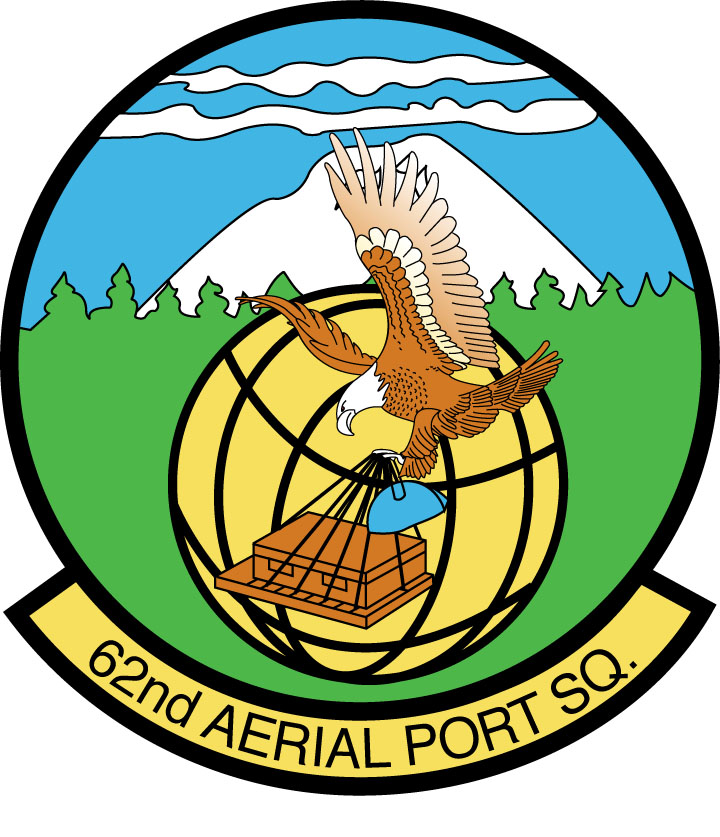
62 APS

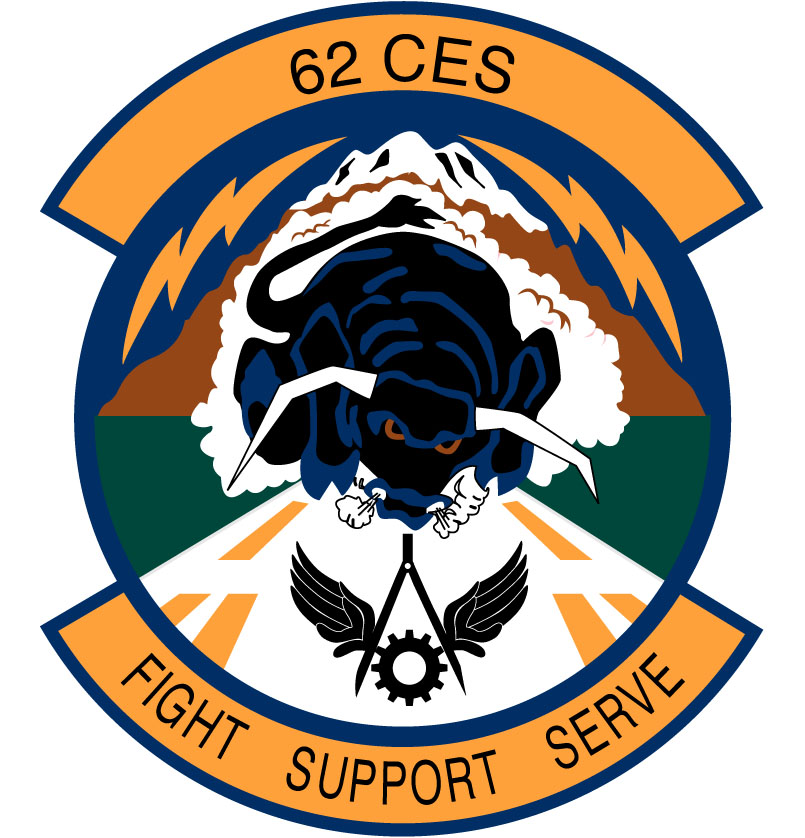
62 CES

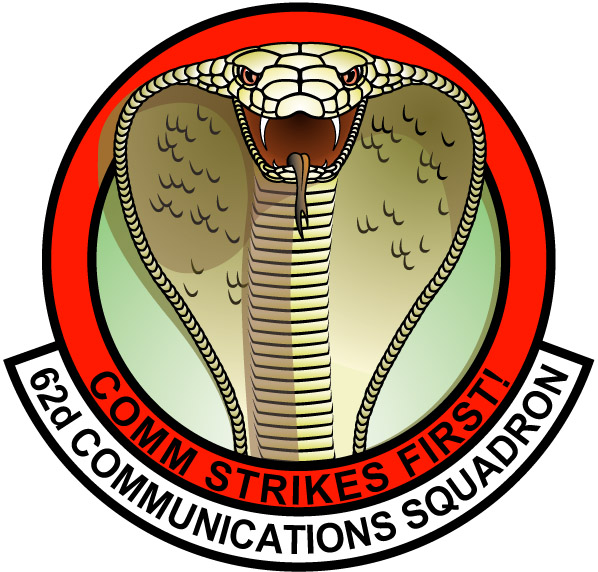
62 CS

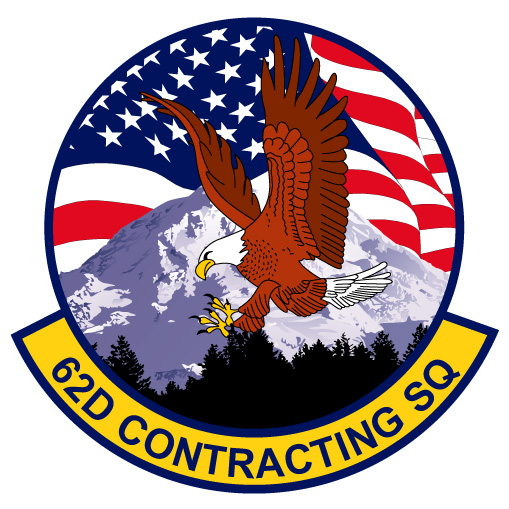
62 CONS

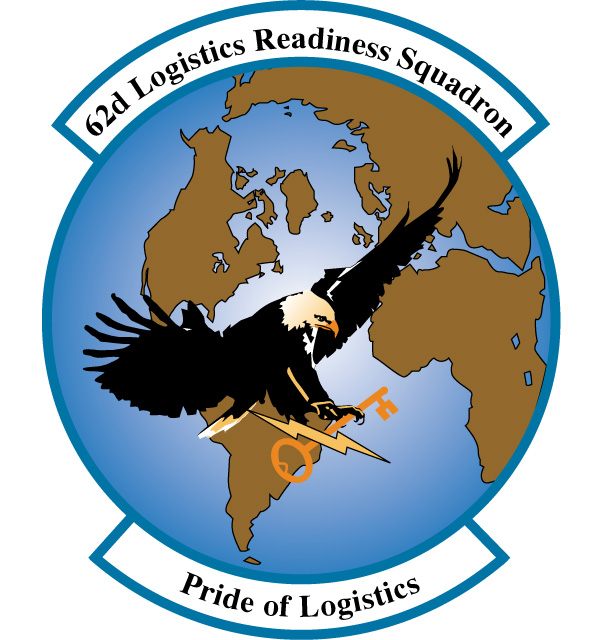
62 LRS

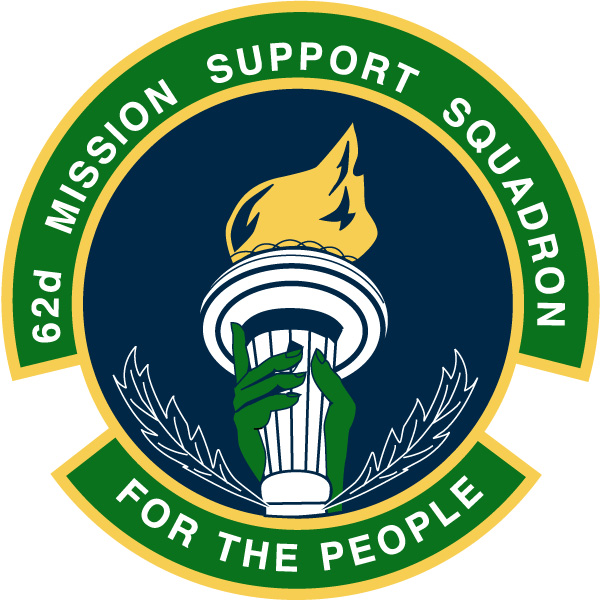
62 MSS

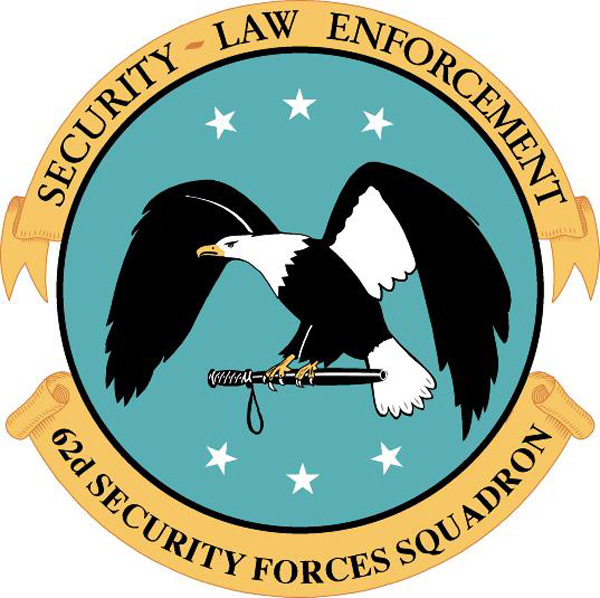
62 SFS

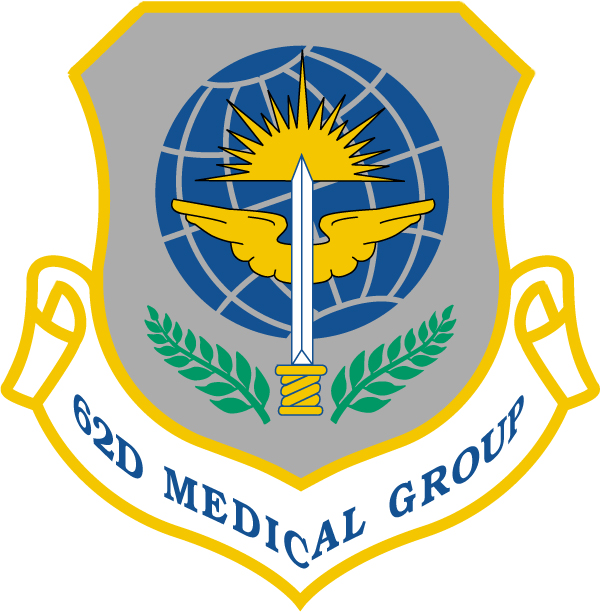
62 MDG

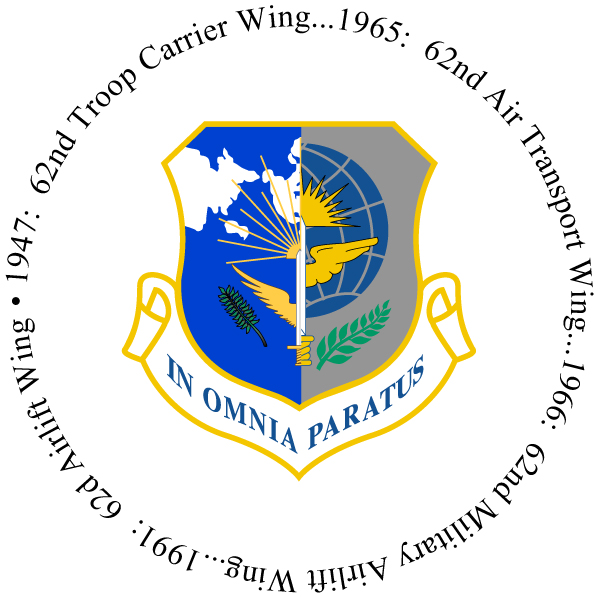
Historical Wing Shields
