= Flight 501 =

Flight 501 may refer to:

- Pacific Western Airlines Flight 501, caught fire during takeoff on 22 March 1984
- LANSA Flight 501, crashed on 27 April 1966
- Ariane 5 Flight 501, a launch failure of the spacecraft Cluster on 4 June 1996
- Vietnam Civil Aviation Flight 501, hijacked flight in 1978
