= 501st Military Intelligence Battalion (United States) =

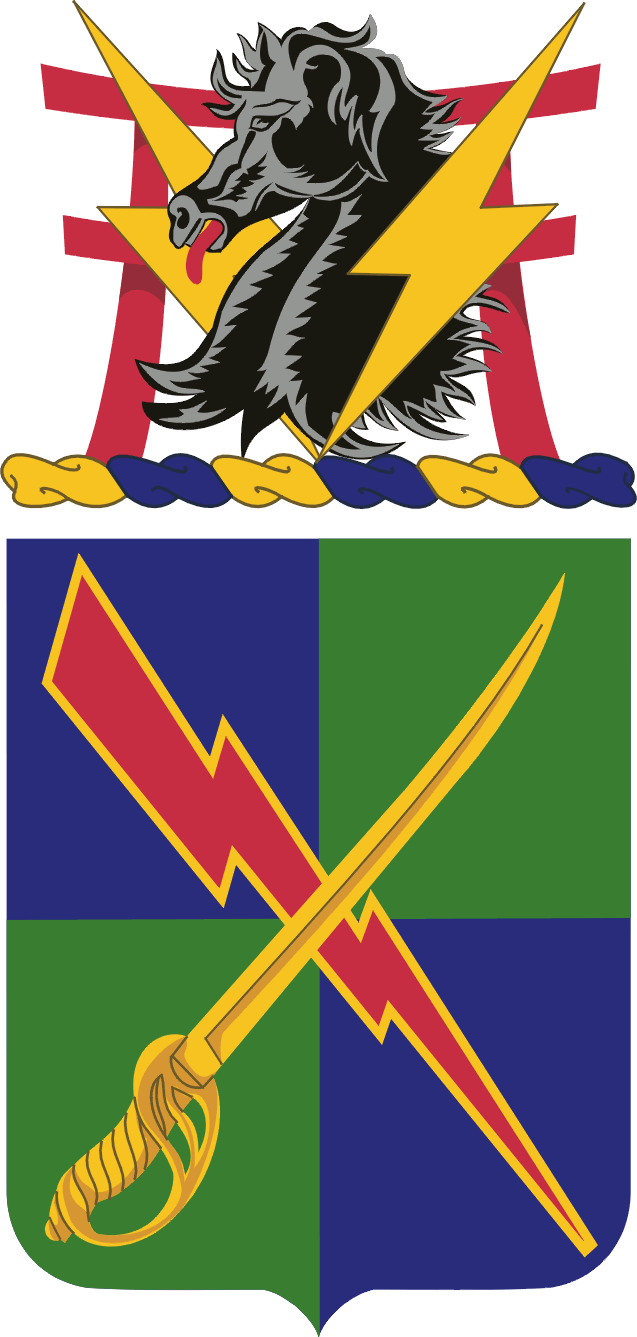
- Battalion coat of arms
- Active: October 20, 1950–May 2007
- Disbanded: May 2007
- Country: United States
- Branch: United States Army
- Role: Military intelligence
- Headquarters: Wackernheim, Germany
- Motto(s): Out Front
- Engagements: Korean War; Gulf War; Iraq War
- Decorations: Meritorious Unit Commendation; Republic of Korea Presidential Unit Citation

Insignia
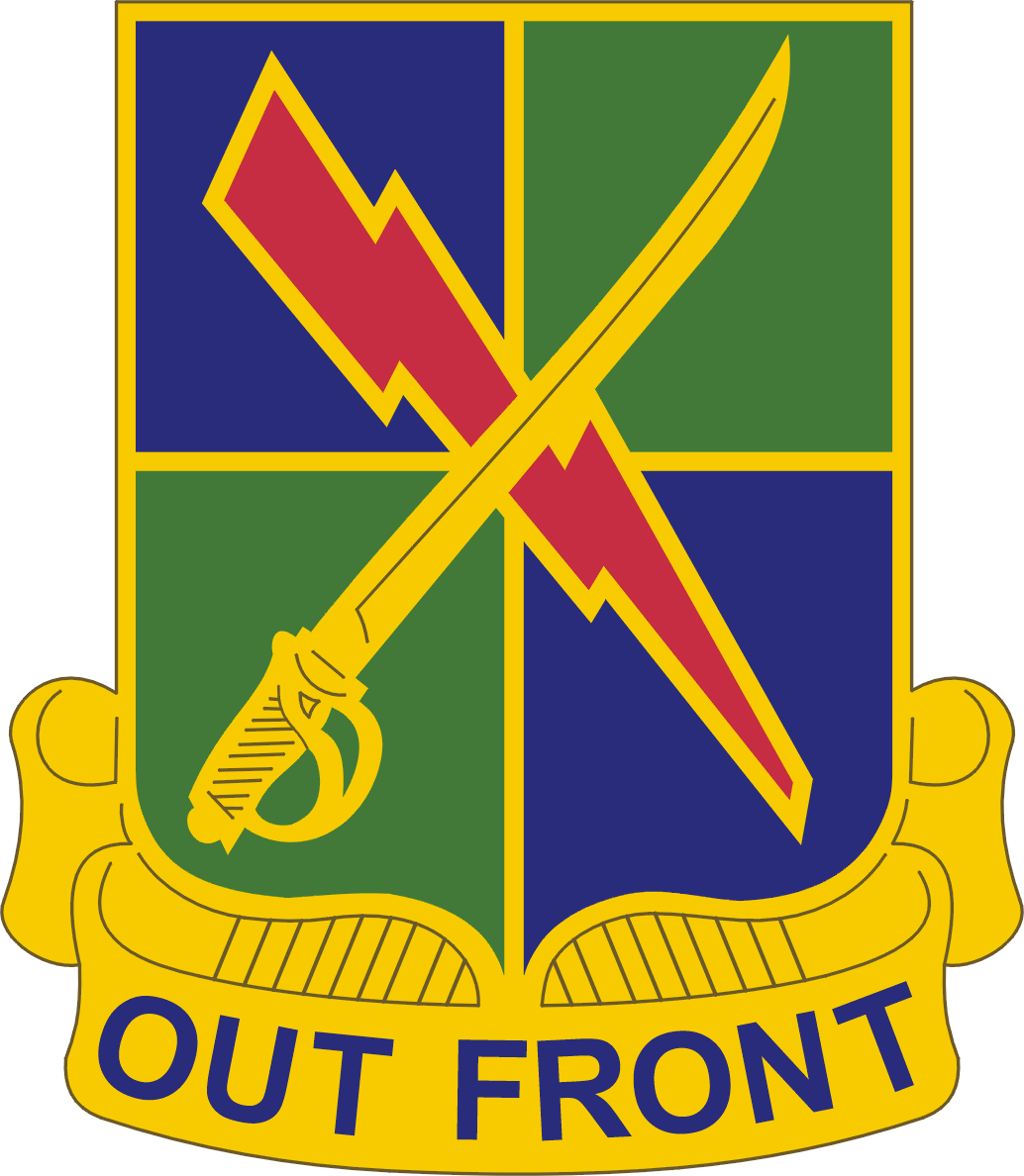
- Distinctive Unit Insignia

The 501st Military Intelligence Battalion is an inactive unit of the United States Army Military Intelligence Corps, which operated during the Korean War and throughout campaigns in the Middle East. It was last headquartered at Wackernheim in the German state of Rhineland Pfalz.

== Lineage and honors ==
- Constituted 13 October 1950 in the Regular Army as Headquarters and Headquarters Detachment, 301st Communication Reconnaissance Battalion
- Activated 20 October 1950 at Camp Pickett, Virginia
- Reorganized and redesignated 25 June 1955 as Headquarters and Headquarters Company, 301st Communication Reconnaissance Battalion (356th Communication Reconnaissance Company [activated 15 January 1946] and 329th Communication Reconnaissance Company [activated 1 November 1943] concurrently reorganized and redesignated as Companies A and B)
- Redesignated 1 July 1956 as the 301st Army Security Agency Battalion
- Inactivated 15 October 1957 in Korea
- Headquarters and Headquarters Company activated 15 December 1965 at Fort Bragg, North Carolina
- Inactivated 18 June 1971 at Fort Bragg, North Carolina
- (Companies A and B redesignated 1 November 1975 as the 356th and 329th Army Security Agency Companies – hereafter separate lineages)
- Headquarters and Headquarters Company, 301st Army Security Agency Battalion, redesignated 16 September 1980 Headquarters, Headquarters and Operations Company, 501st Military Intelligence Battalion, assigned to the 1st Armored Division, and activated in Germany (Army Security Agency Company [see ANNEX 1] concurrently reorganized and redesignated as Company A; 501st Military Intelligence Detachment [see ANNEX 2] redesignated as company B and activated)
- Bravo Company tasked to border operations at Camp Pittman in Weiden, FRG.

Prior to being headquartered in Wackernheim, Germany, the 501st Military Intelligence Battalion was located in Dexheim, Germany, at Anderson Barracks and Ansbach, Germany, Katterbach Kaserne.

ANNEX 1

- Constituted 15 July 1967 in the Regular Army as the 202d Army Security Agency Company and activated at Fort Hood, Texas
- Inactivated 19 April 1971 at Fort Hood, Texas
- Activated 1 July 1974 in Germany

ANNEX 2

- Organized 26 August 1943 in Algeria as the 2678th Headquarters Company, Counter Intelligence Corps (Provisional)
- Disbanded 26 April 1944 and personnel transferred to the 6779th Counter Intelligence Corps Detachment (Provisional)
- Disbanded 18 August 1944 and personnel transferred to the 501st Counter Intelligence Corps Detachment (constituted 12 July 1944 in the Army of the United States)
- Disbanded 26 June 1945 in Italy
- Reconstituted 6 April 1951 in the Regular Army as the 501st Counter Intelligence Corps Detachment
- Activated 11 May 1951 at Fort Holabird, Maryland
- Reorganized and redesignated 25 January 1958 as the 501st Military Intelligence Detachment
- Inactivated 31 March 1971 at Fort Hood, Texas
- Inactivated in 2007. B Co relocates to Baumholder and becomes 502d MI Co with the 2nd Brigade 1 AD. HHC and C Co deactivate. A Co joins 1st Brigade, 1 AD.

== Campaign participation credit ==
- Korean War:
1. Second Korean Winter Korea, Summer-Fall 1952
2. Third Korean Winter Korea, Summer 1953
- Southwest Asia
1. Defense of Saudi Arabia
2. Liberation and Defense of Kuwait
3. Cease-fire
- Operation Joint Endeavor Dec 1995 - Nov 1996

Task Force Falcon

- Operation Iraqi Freedom - April 2003 - July 2004

Company B additionally entitled to:

World War II – EAME Naples-Foggia Anzio Rome-Arno North Apennines Po Valley

- Additionally, both A and B companies deployed with their respective brigades in 1st Armored Division (1st and 2nd Brigade), with Alpha Company deploying January 2006-February 2007, and Bravo Company deploying November 2005-November 2006.

== Decorations ==
1. Meritorious Unit Commendation (Army), Streamer embroidered KOREA
2. Meritorious Unit Commendation (Army), Streamer embroidered SOUTHWEST ASIA
3. Republic of Korea Presidential Unit Citation, Streamer embroidered KOREA
