= 501 Squadron (Portugal) =

Transport squadron of the Portuguese Air Force

- Esquadra 501
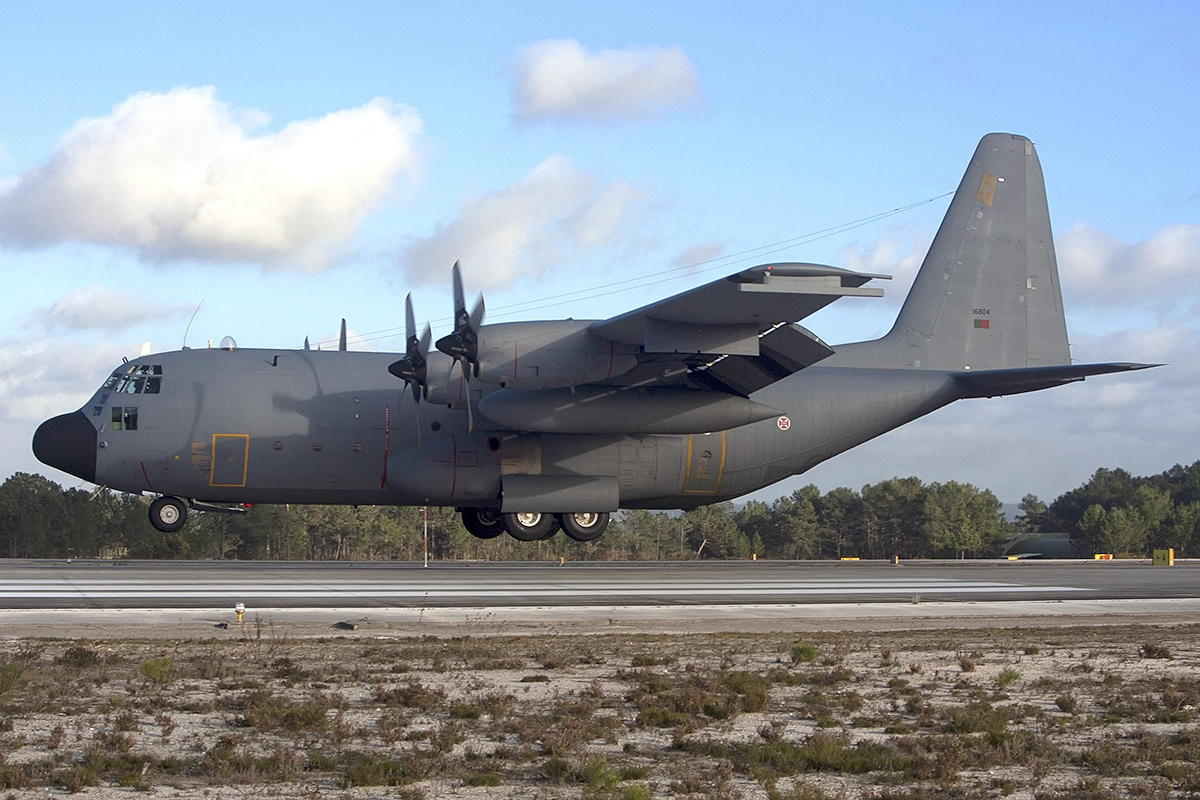
- Portuguese Air Force Lockheed C-130H Hercules
- Active: September 23, 1977
- Country: Portugal
- Branch: Air Force
- Air Base: Air Base No. 6
- Nickname(s): Bisontes (Bisons)
- Mascot(s): Bison
- Anniversaries: September 15
- Decorations: Distinctive Services Gold Medal
- Website: www.emfa.pt/www/po/esq501bisontes

Aircraft flown
- Transport: C-130 Hercules

The 501 Squadron "Bisontes" (Esquadra 501) is a transport squadron of the Portuguese Air Force.

== Roles and missions ==
Primary mission:

- Execute tactical air transport operations.

Secondary missions:

- Execute search and rescue operations;
- Execute general air transport operations;
- Provide support for fire fighting operations. (currently not applicable)

== History ==
Formed on September 23, 1977, with the initial designation of Transport and Maritime Patrol Squadron (Portuguese: Esquadra de Transporte e Patrulhamento Marítimo), its origins date back to 1952, when upon the merger of the Army's Aviation and the Naval Aviation these services' transport aircraft — Junkers Ju 52, C-54 Skymaster and C-47 Dakota — were transferred to the Portuguese Air Force (PoAF).

With this reorganization of the Portuguese military aviation, the two C-54 Skymaster of the former Army's Aviation, which were based at Lajes Air Base transporting passengers between Lisbon and Azores, were transferred to Portela. With the acquisition of five more C-54 in 1953, the Military Air Transports (Portuguese: Transportes Aéreos Militares, TAM) constitutes its first transport squadron based at Portela, the 81 Squadron.

Two groups of the Military Air Transports were created, the first constituted by the already existing C-54 Skymaster and C-47 Dakota aircraft, which continued to be based at Portela; and the second group was an independent unit to be equipped with ten Douglas DC-6, which was based at Air Base No. 6, in Montijo, with the motto "Onde Necessário, Quando Necessário" (Where required, when required). The first DC-6 was delivered on March 10, 1961.

With the start of the Ultramar War there was the necessity for a medium-range aircraft capable of performing transportation in the theater of operations. Six Nord Noratlas aircraft were then purchased from the French UAT airline. A new squadron, 92 Squadron was then formed in Luanda to operate these aircraft. Later, six additional aircraft were acquired for operations in Mozambique by 102 Squadron.

During the war, the transport between the continental Portugal and the oversea territories was performed by 81 Squadron, using the DC-6 and C-54 aircraft based at Portela (Air Base No. 1), while 82 Squadron was equipped with C-45 Expeditor, C-47, and Max Holste Broussard aircraft.

Numerous problems with the maintenance of the DC-6 fleet appeared along the years, mainly due to lack of planning and the age of the airplanes. In April 1968, the fleet consisted of 7 operating aircraft. Meanwhile, with the decision to give the Portuguese Air Force the responsibility for the transportation of the military personnel of all the three branches of the Armed Forces, two Boeing 707s were purchased, having performed their first mission on October 17, 1971. The DC-6s continued flying between the continent and the Azores and Guinea Bissau and the C-54s were finally retired from service. From the 81 Squadron then originated the 131 Squadron, now only with a few DC-6, and 82 Squadron was renamed as 132 Squadron, with the recently acquired 707.

In 1974, with the end of the war, the CASA C-212 aircraft entered service, replacing the C-47, C-45 and, in some missions, the Noratlas aircraft of 32 Squadron, based at Tancos. With the end of the war the Portuguese government then decided to transfer the 707 aircraft to TAP Portugal and to create a new medium- and long-range transport squadron, which was to be equipped with the Lockheed C-130 Hercules to replace the Noratlas, DC-6 and the transferred 707s.

On September 15, 1977, the first C-130H landed at Air Base No. 6, in Montijo, considered today as the "Squadron's Day".

In 1978, the 501 Squadron's initial designation was changed to 501 Transport Squadron "Bisontes".

== Aircraft ==
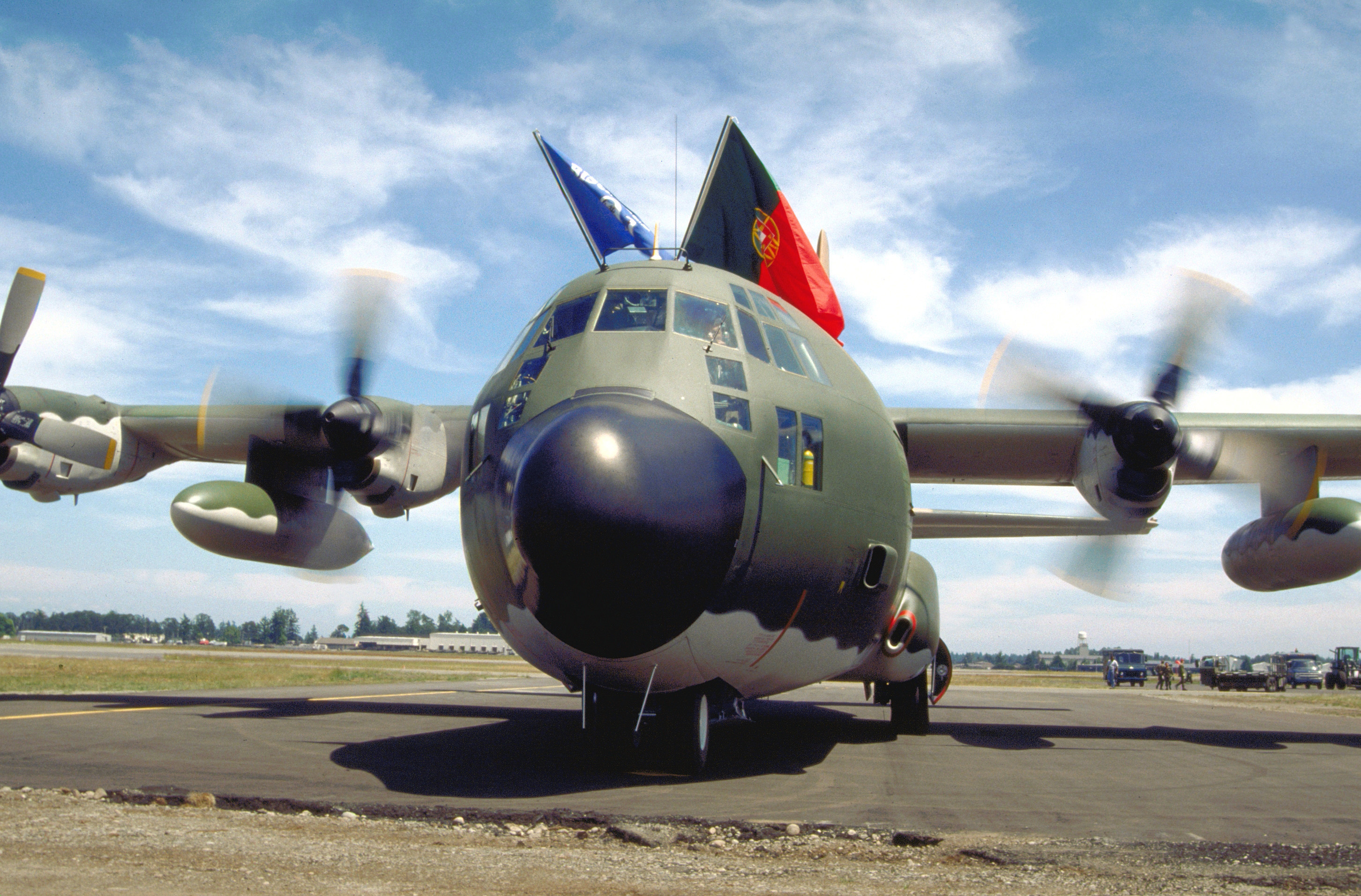
Portuguese Air Force C-130H Hercules arriving at McChord AFB to participate in Air Mobility Rodeo of 1994

- 3 C-130H Hercules (1977—present)
- 3 C-130H-30 Hercules (2 H2 and 1 H3)

== Commanders ==
- Lt. Colonel PILAV Manuel Alvarenga de Sousa Santos (September, 1977 — January, 1978)
- Lt. Colonel PILAV João Carlos de Aguiar e Silva (January, 1978 — August, 1979)
- Lt. Colonel PILAV José Fernandes Nico (August, 1979 — November, 1981)
- Lt. Colonel PILAV João Paiva Brandão (November, 1981 — September, 1983)
- Lt. Colonel PILAV Fernando de Sousa Rodrigues (September, 1983 — September, 1986)
- Lt. Colonel PILAV Jorge Antunes de Andrade (October, 1986 — February, 1991)
- Lt. Colonel PILAV Victor Lourenço Morato (February, 1991 — July, 1993)
- Lt. Colonel PILAV Jorge Fernandes Lessa (July, 1993 — November, 1995)
- Lt. Colonel PILAV Jorge Oliveira (November, 1995 — April, 1998)
- Lt. Colonel PILAV João Cartaxo Alves (April, 1998 — June, 2002)
- Lt. Colonel PILAV José Mendes Catarrinho (June, 2002 — May, 2005)
- Lt. Colonel PILAV António Azevedo dos Santos (May, 2005 — ?)
- Lt. Colonel PILAV Paulo Peres
- Lt. Colonel PILAV Fernando Castro
- Major PILAV Jorge Gonçalves

== See also ==
- Portuguese Air Force
- Air Mobility Rodeo
- International Security Assistance Force
- List of Lockheed C-130 Hercules operators
- List of aircraft of the Portuguese Air Force
