= 501st Tactical Reconnaissance Squadron (JASDF) =

- 第501飛行隊
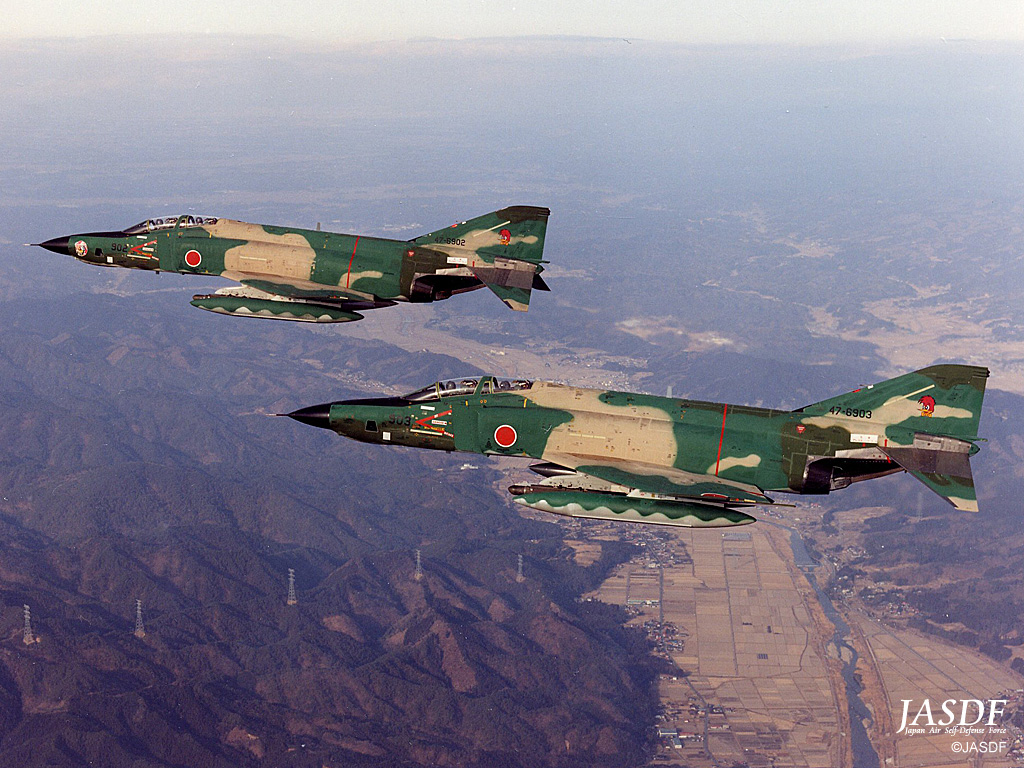
- Active: December 1, 1961
- Disbanded: March 26, 2020
- Country: Japan
- Branch: Japan Air Self-Defense Force
- Part of: Tactical Reconnaissance Group
- Garrison/HQ: Hyakuri Air Base

Aircraft flown
- Reconnaissance: RF-4EJ, RF-4E
- Trainer: Kawasaki T-4

The 501st Tactical Reconnaissance Squadron (第501飛行隊 (dai-go-hyaku-ichi-hikoutai)) was a squadron of the Japan Air Self-Defense Force based at Hyakuri Air Base (Ibaraki Airport) in Ibaraki Prefecture, Japan. It was equipped with RF-4 Phantom II and Kawasaki T-4 aircraft.

== History ==
The 501st was Japan's only tactical reconnaissance squadron. In addition to its defense role, it had also been deployed in response to disasters, such as the Great Hanshin earthquake in 1995 and the Tohoku earthquake and tsunami in 2011.

The squadron formed at Matsushima Air Base in Miyagi Prefecture, with 10 North American RF-86F Sabre aircraft on December 1, 1961. On March 26, 1962, the 18th and final F-86F was delivered. On August 31, 1962, it moved to Iruma Air Base in Saitama Prefecture. At this time, the squadron also had two Lockheed T-33A and one North American T-28B Trojan aircraft. The aircraft's armament of six .50 calibre machine guns was removed to install the cameras, so fake gun ports were painted on.

In 1972, the JASDF decided that the RF-86Fs would be replaced by 14 RF-4E aircraft and that an RF-4E detachment would be formed at Hyakuri Air Base in Ibaraki Prefecture. On October 1, 1974, the first RF-4E was deployed to Hyakuri. In 1975 an "Iruma detachment" was formed to continue operations with the RF-86Fs but on March 25, 1977, the detachment was dissolved with the completion of the replacement.

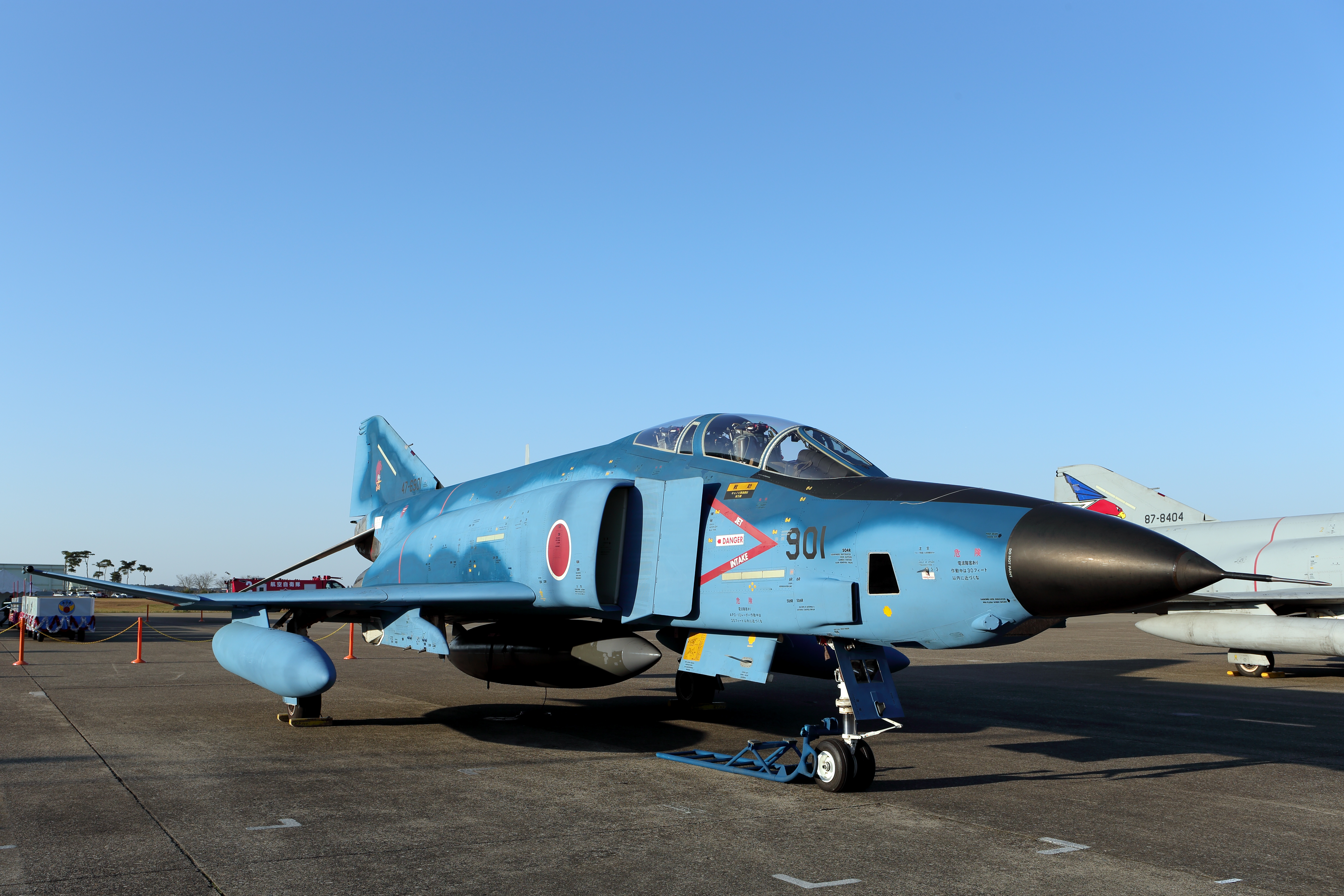
An RF-4E in maritime camouflage

From 1981 the F-15J Eagles began entering service with the JASDF, replacing the F-4EJ Phantom as JASDF's main fighter jet. Starting in 1992, a total of 15 of the surplus F-4EJ fighter aircraft (seven F-4EJ and eight F-4EJ Kai (Kai means "modified")) were modified to RF-4EJ status.

There had been plans to replace the aging RF-4E and RF-4EJ aircraft with reconnaissance versions of the F-15J / F-15DJ aircraft and that Toshiba would produce a reconnaissance pod, but the contract was cancelled as it was not expected to reach the ministry of defense's standards.

After the March 2011 Tohoku earthquake and tsunami, the squadron was used to survey damage.

On March 9, 2020, the last training mission on the RF-4E / RF-4EJ aircraft was conducted. On the same day, a retirement ceremony for the RF-4s were held, and the squadron ceased operations. On March 26, the unit was officially decommissioned.

Reconnaissance missions will be taken over by a squadron of RQ-4 Global Hawk UAVs planned for establishment in Misawa Air Base in FY2021 and other fighter squadrons.

== Squadron emblem/Tail markings ==
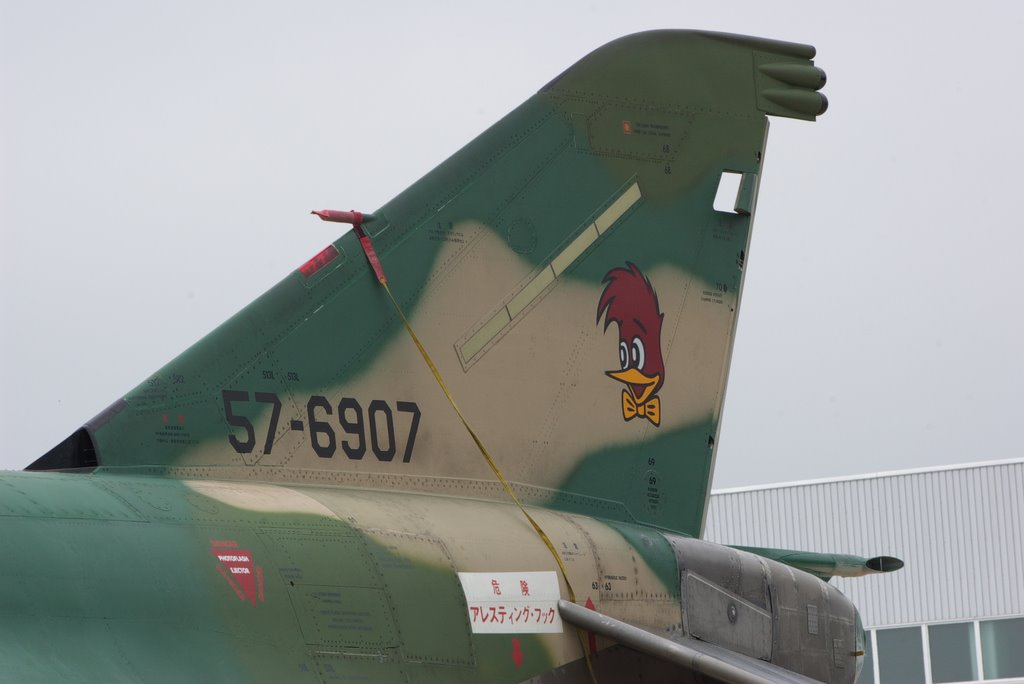
Woody Woodpecker emblem

Since 1961 the squadron's emblem has been the American cartoon character Woody Woodpecker wearing a bowtie. The use of a woodpecker is a tribute to a battle tactic of Takeda Shingen from the 16th century battles of Kawanakajima. When the squadron was equipped with RF-86 Sabres, the aircraft wore a blue and yellow chevron on their tails. The replacement RF-4Es also sported this design until it was replaced by the woodpecker emblem in February 1981.

== Aircraft operated ==
=== Reconnaissance aircraft ===
- North American RF-86F Sabre（1961-1977）
- North American T-28B Trojan（1961-1963）
- McDonnell Douglas RF-4E（1974-2020）
- Mitsubishi RF-4EJ（1993-2020）

=== Liaison aircraft ===
- Lockheed T-33A（1961-1994）
- Kawasaki T-4（1990-2020）

== In popular culture ==
The squadron appeared in the 2006 film Sinking of Japan.

== Gallery ==
Aircraft

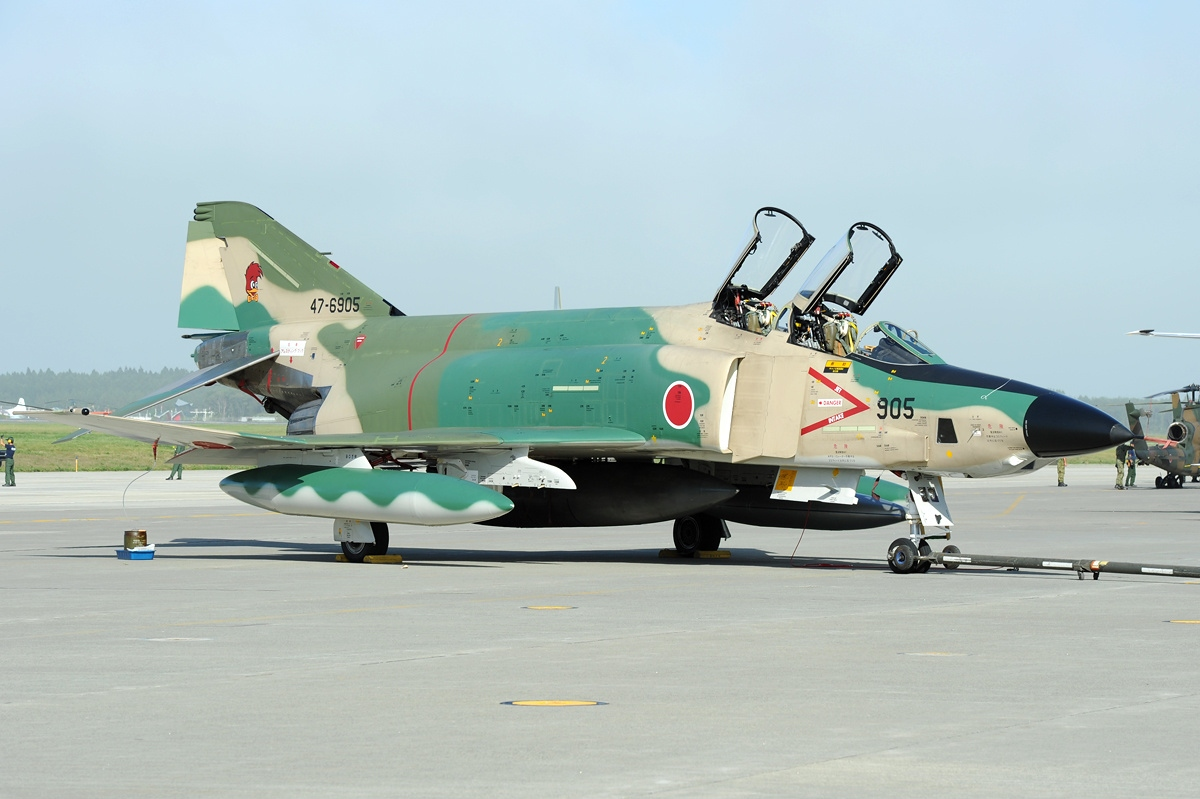
RF-4E Phantom II

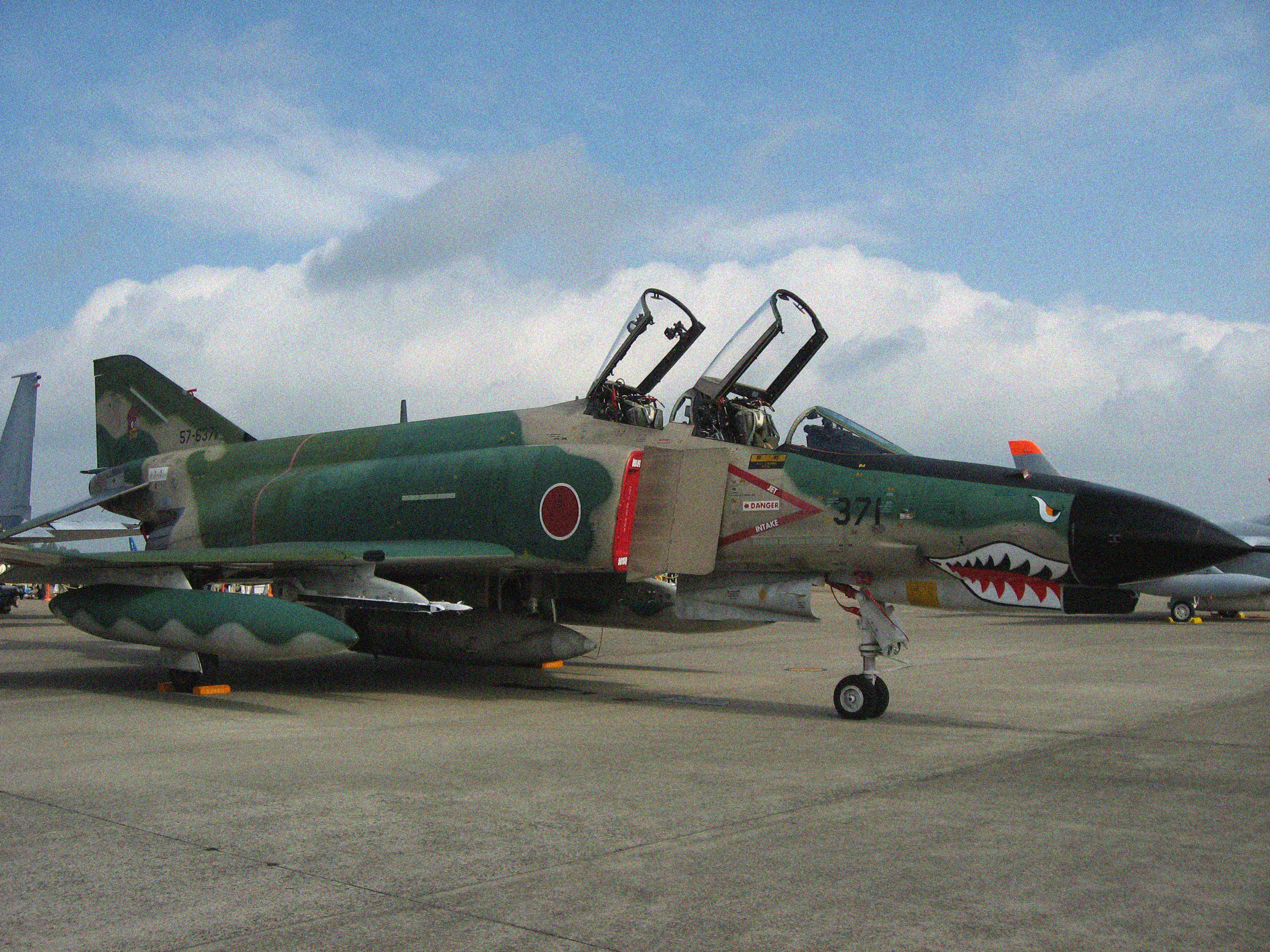
RF-4EJ Phantom II (note cannon)

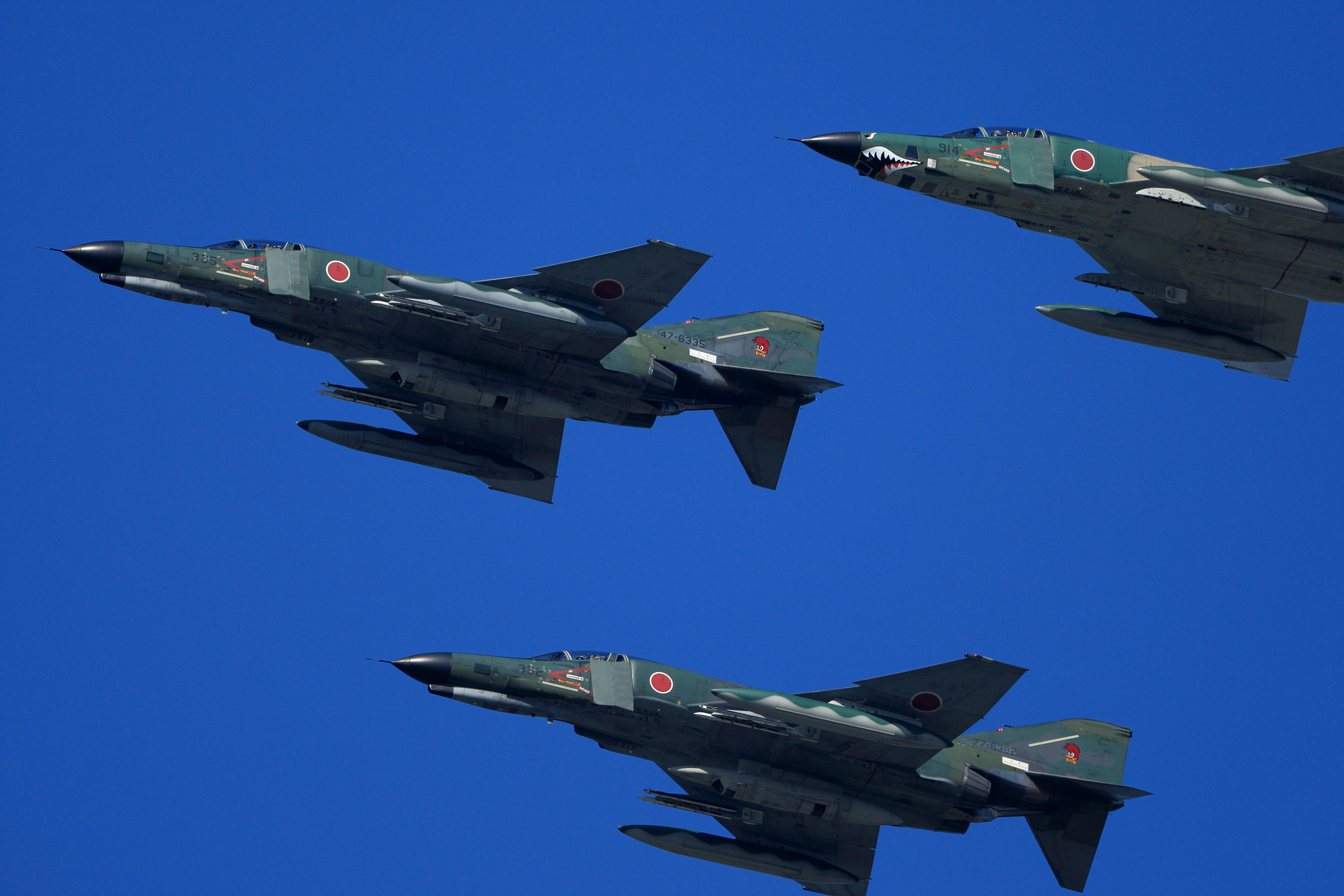
RF-4EJs and RF-4E in flight
