= 823d Air Division =

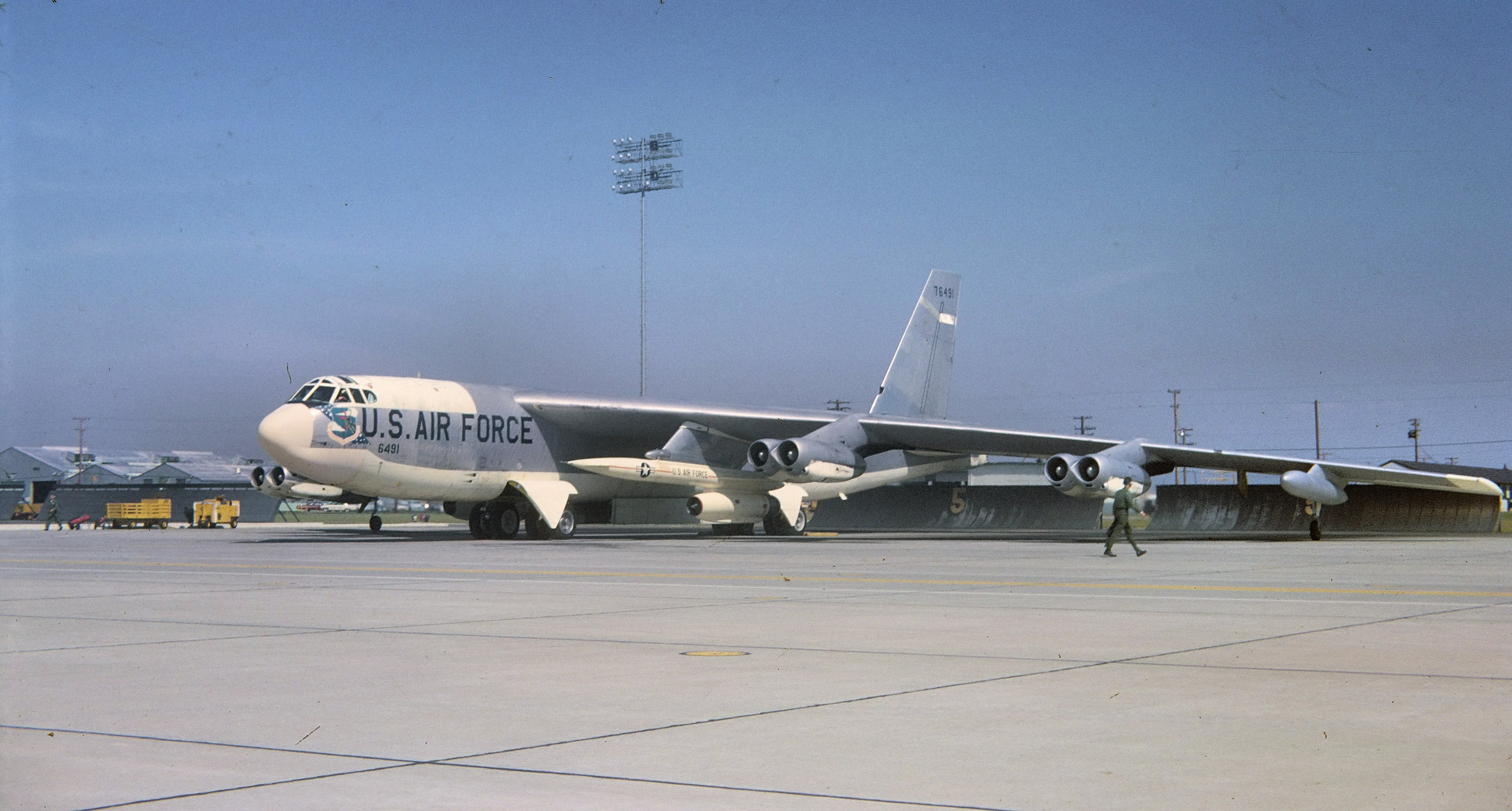
- B-52G Stratofortress in early 1960s SAC markings
- Active: 1956–1971
- Country: United States
- Branch: United States Air Force
- Role: Command and Control of strategic strike forces

Commanders
- Notable commanders: Gen Seth J. McKee; Gen Jack J. Catton; Lt Gen Keith K. Compton; Lt Gen John B. McPherson

Insignia
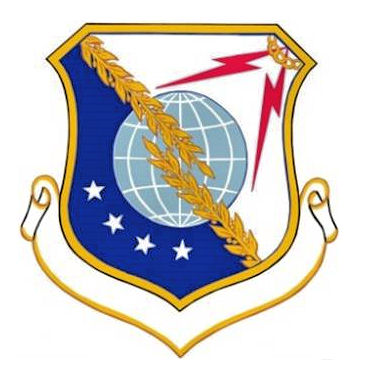
- 823d Air Division emblem (Note: Approved 21 January 1959. Description: Per bend argent and azure, a sphere light blue with grid lines of the first [color mentioned] surmounted overall by two parallel olive branches, the upper issuant from dexter chief, the lower issuant from sinister base both bendwise and terminating in fess or, radiant from sinister chief, two lightning flashes gules surmounted by an arc of five chain links issuant from sinister chief of the fifth [color mentioned], in dexter base an arc of four mullets silver all within a diminished border gold.)

The 823d Air Division is an inactive United States Air Force organization. Its last assignment was with Strategic Air Command (SAC)'s Second Air Force at McCoy Air Force Base, Florida, where it was inactivated on 30 June 1971.

The division was first activated in June 1956 at Homestead Air Force Base, Florida to command the two Boeing B-47 Stratojet wings stationed there when the 19th Bombardment Wing moved to Homestead to join the 379th Bombardment Wing. Each wing deployed to Morocco in 1957, and continued to maintain a portion of their aircraft on alert in Morocco in Operation Reflex as long as they flew the B-47.

In 1961, after the 379th Wing at Homestead inactivated and the 19th Wing had begun its conversions to the Boeing B-52 Stratofortress, the wing became a multibase division, assuming command of the 2d, 306th and 321st Bombardment Wings at bases in Florida and Georgia. By 1963, these wings had either converted to the B-52 or been reassigned. Other wings stationed in Georgia, North Carolina and Puerto Rico and flying the B-52 were assigned to the division before it was inactivated.

The division's wings maintained half their combat ready aircraft on alert, except when their aircraft or aircrews were deployed. During the Cuban Missile Crisis, all combat ready aircraft were on ground or airborne alert, although the wings in Florida deployed to other stations as their bases were needed for shorter range tactical and air defense aircraft. Beginning in 1965, division B-52s began to deploy to the Pacific, where they flew Operation Arc Light missions, while its tankers supported Arc Light and tactical aircraft as part of the Young Tiger Task Force.

The division moved to McCoy Air Force Base in July 1968, when command of Homestead was transferred from SAC to Tactical Air Command. It continued to maintain aircraft on alert and deployed aircraft to Southeast Asia until June 1971, when it was inactivated and replaced by the 42d Air Division, which took over its resources and dispersed wings.

== History ==
=== Command of bombardment wings at Homestead Air Force Base ===
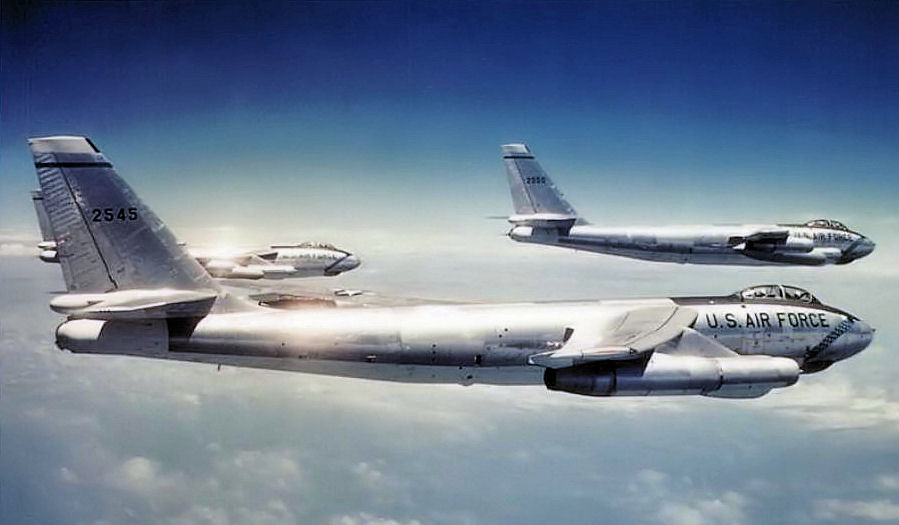
B-47Es of the division's 306th Bombardment Wing (Note: Aircraft in foreground is Boeing B-47E-95-BW Stratojet Serial 52-545. That aircraft was retired to the Military Aircraft Storage and Disposition Center (MASDC) on 19 November 1965, declared excess on 23 October 1968 and scrapped. Baugher, Joe (15 July 2023). "1952 USAF Serial Numbers". Joe Baugher.)

The 823d Air Division was activated 1 June 1956 at Homestead Air Force Base, Florida when the 19th Bombardment Wing moved to Homestead from Pinecastle Air Force Base to join the 379th Bombardment Wing. Although the 379th had been at Homestead since the fall of 1955, it had only begun receiving its Boeing B-47 Stratojets in April 1956. The 19th Wing had been preceded at Homestead by its 19th Air Refueling Squadron, which was activated on 1 February and equipped with Boeing KC-97 Stratofreighters. The division assumed command of the two B-47 wings and host responsibility for the base through its 823d Air Base Group. The division began to train its wings in long range offensive bombardment and air refueling operations.

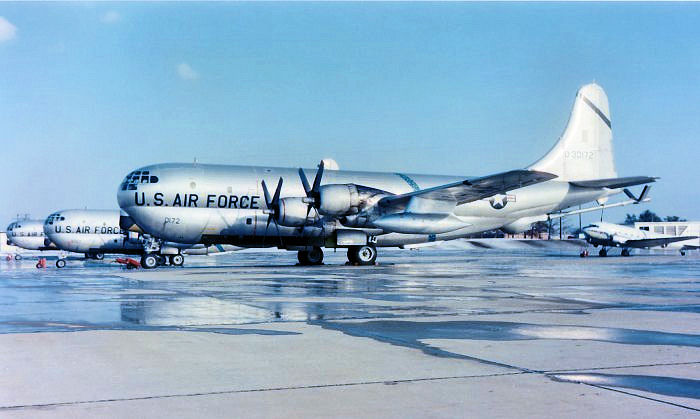
100th Air Refueling Squadron KC-97G (Note: Aircraft is Boeing KC-97G Stratofreighter Serial 53-172. This plane was transferred to MASDC on 20 December 1965. It was returned to service on 1971 and converted to KC-97L configuration with the addition of two General Electric J47 jet engines. It was later transferred to the Spanish Air Force. Baugher, Joe (5 August 2023). "1953 USAF Serial Numbers". Joe Baugher. The 100th Air Refueling Squadron was assigned to the division's 2d Bombardment Wing. Ravenstein, pp. 36–39.)

In March 1957, the 379th Wing deployed as a unit to Sidi Slimane Air Base, Morocco, followed in May by the 19th Wing. As long as these wings continued to fly the Stratojet, they continuously maintained a portion of their aircraft on alert in Morocco, although they made no further deployments as complete units. In addition to its SAC mission, and because of its Florida location, the division was occasionally called upon to provide support for space launches from Cape Canaveral. The Florida location, unfortunately, also meant that the division had to evacuate its base when hurricanes threatened.

The division's responsibilities as the host for Homestead expanded in July 1960, when the 435th Troop Carrier Wing of Continental Air Command, with its Fairchild C-119 Flying Boxcars, and other Air Force Reserve units moved to Homestead from Miami International Airport.

=== Conversion to the B-52 ===
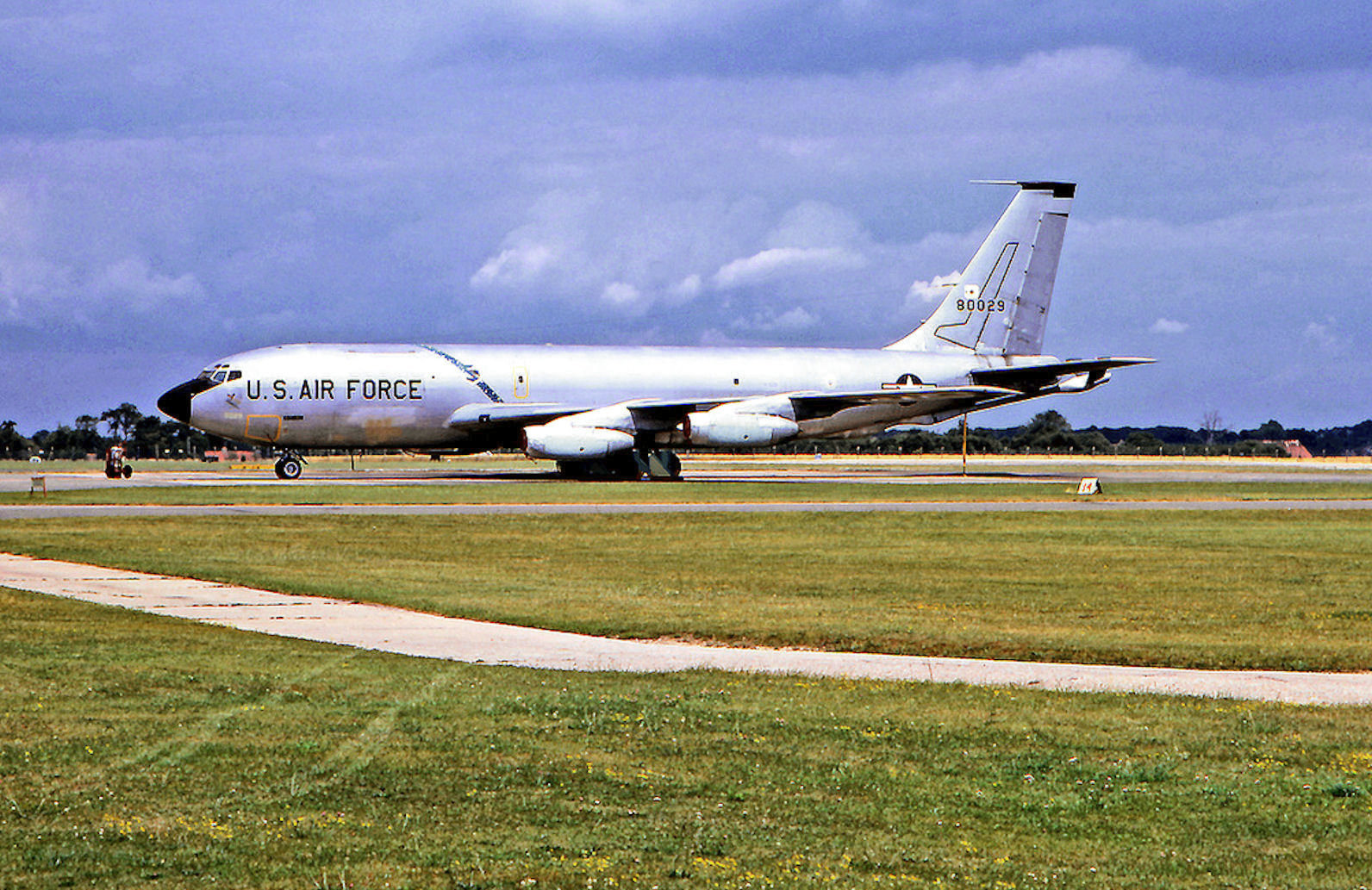
911th Air Refueling Squadron KC-135A (Note: The aircraft is Boeing KC-135A-BN Stratotanker Serial 58-0029. It was transferred to the Aerospace Maintenance and Regeneration Center on 2 December 1992. Baugher, Joe (27 July 2023). "1958 USAF Serial Numbers". Joe Baugher. The 911th Air Refueling Squadron was assigned to the division's 19th Bombardment Wing. Ravenstein, pp. 7–9.)

In October 1960, the 379th wing began to transfer its aircraft to Davis-Monthan Air Force Base for storage in preparation for a move on paper to Wurtsmith Air Force Base, Michigan and reassignment to another division. Although the 823d was originally scheduled to inactivate with only a single wing left at Homestead, by the time the 379th's move occurred in January 1961 the division instead began preparations for a new role as the command element for dispersed bombardment wings, which would include four bombardment wings at four locations by the end of 1961. The 306th Bombardment Wing at MacDill Air Force Base, Florida and 321st Bombardment Wing at McCoy Air Force Base, (Note: Pinecastle Air Force Base had been renamed McCoy Air Force Base on 25 May 1958. "Abstract, History 76 Fighter Interceptor Squadron January 1958 – December 1959". Air Force History Index..) Florida were assigned to the wing in early February and the 2d Bombardment Wing at Hunter Air Force Base, Georgia became the division's fourth wing in April.

Changes in the division strength for the next few years were brought on as its wings converted from the B-47 to the Boeing B-52 Stratofortress. The first Stratofortress unit assigned to the division was the 4047th Strategic Wing at McCoy Air Force Base, which was organized on 1 July 1961 as part of SAC's plan to disperse its B-52 heavy bombers over a larger number of bases, thus making it more difficult for the Soviet Union to knock out the entire fleet with a surprise first strike. In September 1961 the 347th Bombardment Squadron, consisting of 15 Stratofortresses, moved to McCoy from Westover Air Force Base, Massachusetts. The 321st Wing at McCoy had already become non-operational in May, and was inactivated on 25 October 1961. The 19th Wing inactivated one of its squadrons and dispersed two others. Toward the end of 1961, the 19th began to convert its remaining bombardment squadron to the B-52 and its refueling squadron to the Boeing KC-135 Stratotanker, completing the transition in early 1962.

As they became combat ready, one third of the division's B-52 and Boeing KC-135 Stratotanker aircraft were maintained on fifteen-minute alert, fully fueled, armed and ready for combat to reduce vulnerability to a Soviet missile strike. This was increased to half the division's aircraft in 1962.

The last B-47 wings assigned to the division were terminated on 1 April 1963. At Hunter Air Force Base, the 2d Bombardment Wing had been disposing of its Stratojets, preparing to transfer the base to Military Air Transport Service and the Douglas C-124 Globemaster IIs of the 63d Troop Carrier Wing before moving as a paper unit to Barksdale Air Force Base. Once the base transfer was completed, the wing moved and was reassigned. At MacDill, the 306th Wing was programmed for inactivation once its B-47s were gone. Instead, it deployed them to join the remaining Stratojets of the 2d Wing at Hunter in October 1962, then moved on paper to replace the 4047th Wing at McCoy. (Note: Major Command controlled (MAJCON) units, such as the 4047th, could not maintain a permanent history or lineage, so SAC replaced tham with units controlled by Headquarters, USAF, which could. See Ravenstein, p. 12. (explaining the difference between the two types of unit).)

On 1 October 1962, shortly before the start of the Cuban Missile Crisis, the 72d Bombardment Wing, another B-52 wing located at Ramey Air Force Base, Puerto Rico was assigned to the division.

=== Cuban Missile Crisis ===
Soon after detection of Soviet missiles in Cuba, SAC withdrew its forces from MacDill, McCoy and Homestead as these bases became saturated with tactical forces. With the exception of aircraft already on alert, the division's aircraft left Florida by 21 October. The departing bombers carried nuclear weapons in the ferrying configuration. Alert aircraft left MacDill and Homestead by 22 October and McCoy by 24 October in Operation Riders Up. McCoy sent three of the 4047th Wing's B-52Ds to Turner Air Force Base, Georgia and two to Sheppard Air Force Base, Texas, while 26 B-47Es of the 321st Wing moved to Hunter. Homestead flew two B-52Hs to Wurtsmith and seven KC-135As to Bergstrom Air Force Base, Texas. The dispersing B-47s were configured for execution of the Emergency War Order as soon as possible after dispersal. Because of inadequate facilities and security at West Palm Beach International Airport, 306th Wing B-47s initially deployed there relocated to Hurlburt Field after a few days. On 29 October additional KC-97s were dispersed to Goose and Ernest Harmon Air Force Bases in Canada and Lajes Air Base in the Azores to provide refueling for the B-47s on increased alert status.

On 20 October all the division's B-52 units except the 19th Wing were directed to put two additional aircraft on alert. On 22 October 1/8 of the B-52s were placed on airborne alert. Additional KC-135 were placed on alert to replace KC-135s devoted to maintaining the B-52 bomber force on airborne alert. On 24 October SAC went to DEFCON 2, placing all aircraft on alert. They remained in this state until 21 November, when SAC returned to its normal airborne alert posture and went to DEFCON 3. The dispersed B-47s and their supporting tankers were recalled on 24 November. On 27 November SAC returned to normal alert posture and began coordinating the return of its Florida aircraft to their home bases.

=== Vietnam War ===
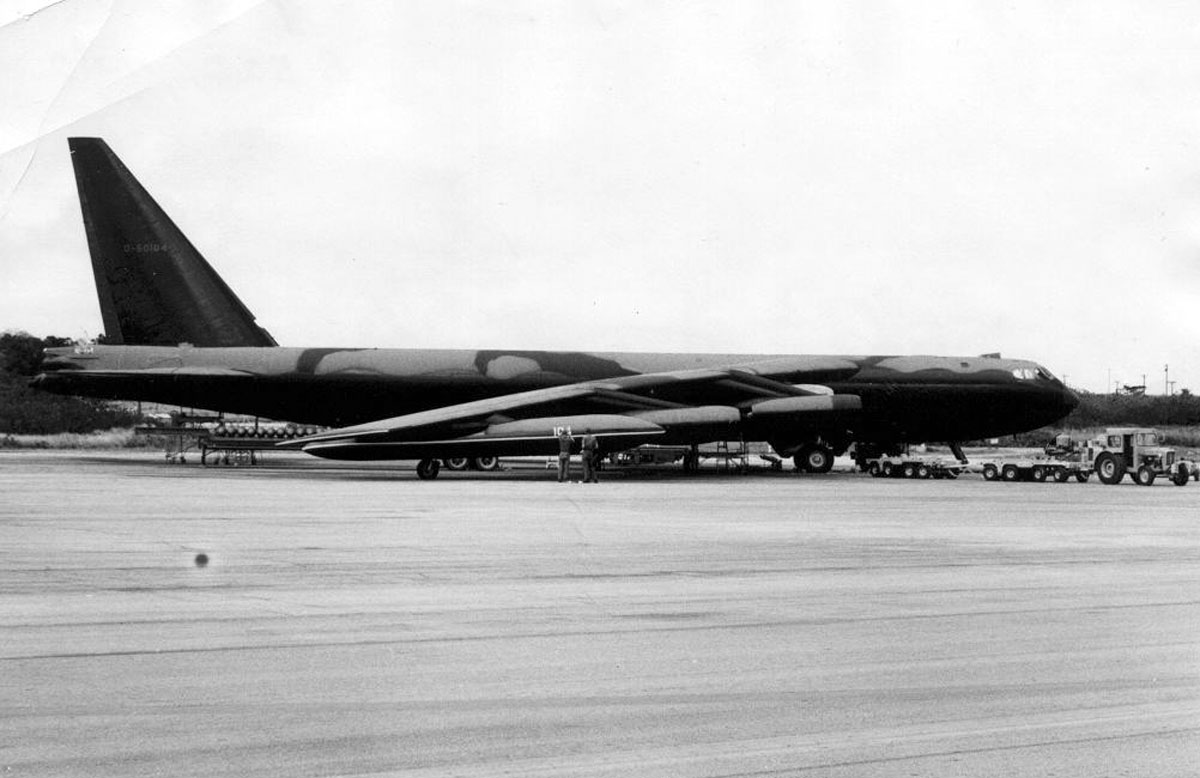
B-52D of the division's 484th Bombardment Wing deployed at Andersen AFB (Note: Aircraft is Boeing B-52D-60-BO Serial 55-104. This plane was transferred to MASDC on 27 May 1982 and later scrapped. Baugher, Joe (27 July 2023). "1955 USAF Serial Numbers". Joe Baugher..)

The division's B-52D and B-52G wings (Note: The 19th Wing, equipped with B-52H aircraft, did not deploy bombers to the Pacific to support Southeast Asia operations.) converted to conventional bombing configuration for use in the Vietnam War. Between 1965 and 1971, the division's subordinate units deployed aircraft and crews to Strategic Air Command organizations in Southeast Asia in support of Operation Arc Light combat operations.

In September 1966, the 484th Bombardment Wing at Turner Air Force Base, Georgia was assigned to the wing. Initially, the wing at Turner was a shell organization, for all wing aircrews, wing headquarters personnel and most support personnel were deployed to the 3d Air Division for combat operations. The deployed portions of the wing returned to Georgia by the end of September. However, the 484th barely had time to resume normal operations. Its 824th Bombardment Squadron inactivated in late January 1967 and the wing inactivated on 25 March. The wing's tankers of the 919th Air Refueling Squadron remained in the division, however, when they moved to McCoy and were assigned to the 306th Wing. Turner was transferred to the Navy at the end of June.

On 1 July 1968, Homestead was transferred from SAC to Tactical Air Command as SAC withdrew its forces from the base. The division moved to McCoy Air Force Base the following day. The 19th wing remained at Homestead until 25 July to dispose of the remaining SAC assets there before moving on paper to Robins Air Force Base, Georgia, where it replaced the 465th Bombardment Wing and was reassigned. While assigned to the 823d, each of those wings periodically lacked full combat capability because nearly all their aircraft and personnel were deployed for combat operations in the Pacific.

Exactly one year later, the division saw the last change of wings under its command. On 2 July 1969, the 19th Bombardment Wing returned to the division along with the 68th Bombardment Wing at Seymour Johnson Air Force Base, North Carolina.

The 823d was inactivated at the end of June 1971 and its mission, personnel and equipment were transferred to the 42d Air Division, which was simultaneously activated at McCoy.

== Lineage ==
- Established as the 823 Air Division on 19 June 1956

Activated on 1 June 1956
Inactivated on 30 June 1971

=== Assignments ===
- Second Air Force, 1 June 1956
- Eighth Air Force, 1 January 1959
- Second Air Force, 31 March 1970 – 30 June 1971

=== Stations ===
- Homestead Air Force Base, Florida, 1 June 1956
- McCoy Air Force Base, Florida, 2 July 1968 – 30 June 1971

=== Components ===
==== Wings ====
- 2d Bombardment Wing, 1 April 1961 – 1 April 1963

Hunter Air Force Base, Georgia (Note: Subordinate units were stationed on the same base as division headquarters except as noted. The 19th wing briefly remained at Homestead when the division moved to McCoy in 1968. Ravenstein, pp. 36–39.)

- 19th Bombardment Wing, 1 June 1956 – 25 July 1968 (attached to 5th Air Division 8 May – 7 June 1957); 2 July 1969 – 30 June 1971

Robins Air Force Base, Georgia, 1969–1971

- 68th Bombardment Wing, 2 July 1969 – 30 June 1971

Seymour Johnson Air Force Base, North Carolina

- 72nd Bombardment Wing, 1 October 1962 – 30 June 1971

Ramey Air Force Base, Puerto Rico

- 306th Bombardment Wing, 6 February 1961 – 30 June 1971

MacDill Air Force Base, Florida until 1 April 1963, then McCoy Air Force Base, Florida

- 321st Bombardment Wing, 6 February – 25 October 1961

McCoy Air Force Base, Florida

- 379th Bombardment Wing, 1 June 1956 – 9 January 1961 (attached to 5th Air Division 6 March – 12 May 1957)
- 484th Bombardment Wing, 2 September 1966 – 25 March 1967

Turner Air Force Base, Georgia

- 4047th Strategic Wing, 1 July 1961 – 1 April 1963

McCoy Air Force Base, Florida

==== Groups ====
- 484th Combat Support Group, 25 March – 30 June 1967

Turner Air Force Base, Georgia

- 823d Air Base Group (later 823d Combat Support Group), 1 June 1956 – c. 1 July 1961
- 823d Medical Group, 1 November 1968 – 1 October 1961

==== Squadron ====
303rd Air Refueling Squadron, 1 October 1959 – 1 November 1959

==== Other ====
- 4226th USAF Dispensary (later 4226th USAF Hospital), 1 November 1956 – 1 November 1958

=== Aircraft ===
- Boeing B-47 Stratojet, 1956–1963
- Boeing KC-97 Stratofreighter, 1956–1963
- Boeing B-52 Stratofortress, 1962–1968; 1969–1971
- Boeing KC-135 Stratotanker, 1962–1968; 1969–1971

=== Commanders ===
- Brig Gen Keith K. Compton, 1 June 1956
- Col Travis M. Hetherington, 1 June 1957
- Col Seth J. McKee, 30 August 1958
- Col John B. McPherson, 18 September 1959
- Brig Gen Jack J. Catton, 3 July 1962
- Maj Gen Alvan C. Gillem II, c. Aug 1963
- Maj Gen William E. Creer, 29 July 1964
- Maj Gen Kenneth R. Powell, 28 June 1966 – unknown
- Brig Gen Salvador E. Felices, 12 April 1969
- Col Howard P. McClain, 26 May 1970
- Brig Gen Woodrow A. Abbott, 1 August 1970 – 30 June 1971

== See also ==
- List of United States Air Force air divisions
- List of MAJCOM wings of the United States Air Force
- List of USAF Bomb Wings and Wings assigned to Strategic Air Command
- List of USAF Strategic Wings assigned to the Strategic Air Command
- List of B-47 units of the United States Air Force
- List of B-52 Units of the United States Air Force
