= 484th Air Expeditionary Wing =

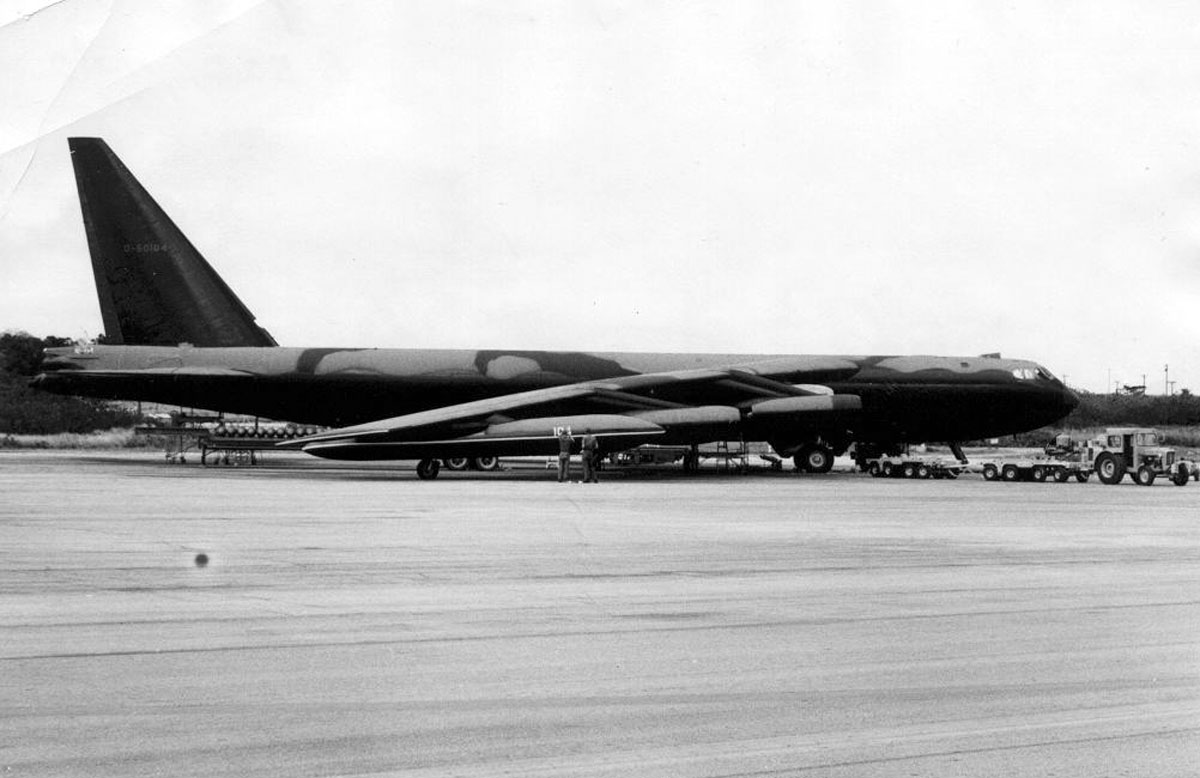
- Boeing B-52D 55-0104 of the 484th Bombardment Wing at Andersen AFB, Guam in 1966
- Active: 1943–1945; 1963–1967; 2003
- Country: United States
- Branch: United States Air Force
- Type: Air Expeditionary
- Role: Combat Support
- Part of: Air Combat Command
- Motto: Semper Ascendans (Latin for 'Always Ascending') (World War II)
- Engagements: World War II; European Campaign (1943–1945): Iraq War
- Decorations: Distinguished Unit Citation

Insignia
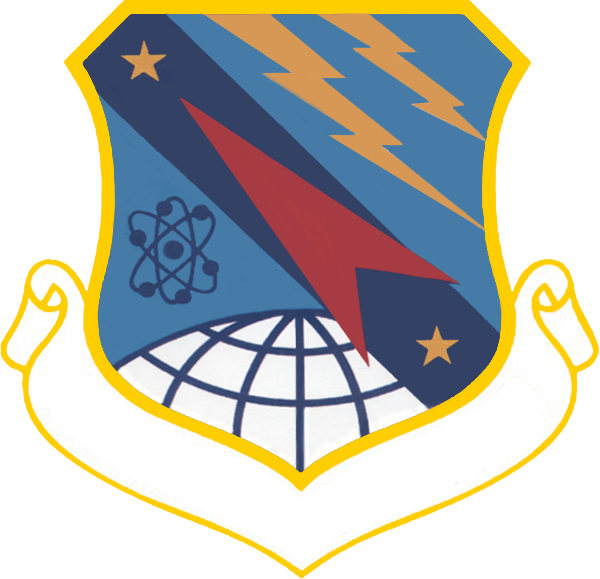
- 484th Air Expeditionary Wing emblem (Note: Approved 19 March 1964.)

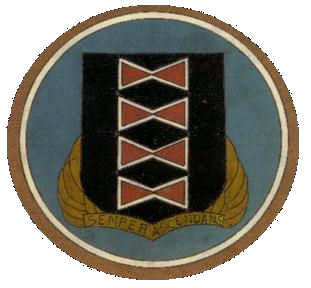
- 84th Bombardment Group emblem

The 484th Air Expeditionary Wing is a provisional United States Air Force unit assigned to Air Combat Command. It may be activated or inactivated at any time. It was activated and attached to United States Air Forces Central for the 2003 invasion of Iraq ("Operation Iraqi Freedom"). It was headquartered at Prince Sultan Air Base, Saudi Arabia.

The wing was originally activated in 1943 as the 484th Bombardment Group as a World War II United States Army Air Forces combat unit. The group served primarily in the Mediterranean Theater of Operations. During operations from Italy, it twice was awarded with Distinguished Unit Citations for missions in Germany and Austria. When hostilities in Europe ended, the group was assigned to expedite the movement of troops and equipment from Europe back to the United States,

The 484th Bombardment Wing was organized in February 1963 at Turner Air Force Base, Georgia. The wing temporarily inherited the lineage, honors, and history of the 484th group, although the group was not reactivated as a wing element. In 1966 all wing aircraft, crews, all wing headquarters personnel and most wing support personnel were deployed to the 3d Air Division for combat operations over Vietnam. The wing was inactivated on 25 March 1967 as part of the closure of Turner. In 1984, the group and wing were consolidated into a single unit.

== History ==
=== World War II ===
The 484th Bombardment Group (Heavy) was constituted on 14 September 1943 as a Consolidated B-24 Liberator heavy bombardment group and activated on 20 September at Harvard Army Air Field, Nebraska. Its original squadrons were the newly activated 824th, 825th, and 826th Bombardment Squadrons and the 827th Bombardment Squadron, which moved to Harvard AAF after two years of anti-submarine warfare experience on the east coast of the United States

The group completed training at Harvard AAF in February 1944 and then deployed to the Mediterranean Theater of Operations in Southern Italy. It departed the United States in early March and arrived in April at Torretta Airfield, Italy, where it was part of Fifteenth Air Force. The group was redesignated 484th Bombardment Group (Pathfinder) in May 1944 but did not perform pathfinder functions. It became the 484th Bombardment Group, Heavy again in November 1944 and operated primarily as a strategic bombardment organization, April 1944 – April 1945. The 484th attacked such targets as oil refineries, oil storage plants, aircraft factories, heavy industry, and communications in Italy, France, Germany, Austria, Czechoslovakia, Hungary, Rumania, and Yugoslavia.

On 13 June 1944 a heavy smoke screen prevented the group from bombing railroad marshalling yards at Munich; however, in spite of severe damage to its aircraft from flak and interceptor aircraft, and despite heavy gunfire encountered at the alternate target the group bombed the marshalling yards at Innsbruck and received a Distinguished Unit Citation (DUC) for its persistent action. The 484th received a second DUC for its performance on 22 August 1944 when, unescorted, the organization fought its way through intense opposition to attack underground oil storage installations in Vienna, Austria.

In addition to strategic missions, the 484th participated in the drive toward Rome by bombing bridges, supply dumps, viaducts, and marshalling yards in April through June 1944. It also ferried gasoline and oil to Allied forces in southern France in September 1944 and supported the final advance by Fifth Army through northern Italy in April 1945.

After V-E Day, was assigned to Green Project which was the movement of troops from Europe to the United States via the South Atlantic Transport Route. B-24s were modified with sealed bomb bays, removal of all defensive armament and internal fuselage equipped with seating to carry approximately 30 personnel. It was assigned to Air Transport Command at Casablanca Airfield, French Morocco. The group moved personnel from staging areas in France and Italy to Casablanca and also south to Dakar in French West Africa where personnel were transported across the South Atlantic to Brazil and eventually to Morrison Field, Florida. Provided air transport until the end of July when the unit was inactivated.

=== Strategic Air Command ===
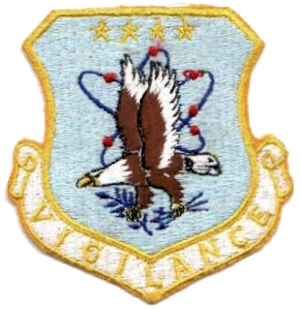
Patch with 4138th Strategic Wing emblem

4138th Strategic Wing

The origins of the 484th Bombardment Wing can be traced to 1 January 1959 when Strategic Air Command (SAC) established the 4138th Strategic Wing at Turner Air Force Base, Georgia and assigned it to the 822d Air Division as part of SAC's plan to disperse its Boeing B-52 Stratofortress heavy bombers over a larger number of bases, thus making it more difficult for the Soviet Union to knock out the entire fleet with a surprise first strike. The wing also assumed host base responsibility for Turner from the 31st Tactical Fighter Wing as Turner transferred to SAC from Tactical Air Command. On 1 February 1959 the wing's first squadron associated with its strategic bombardment mission, the 62d Aviation Depot Squadron, was activated to oversee the wing's special weapons. It received its first combat aircraft when the 336th Bombardment Squadron, with 15 Boeing B-52 Stratofortresses moved to Turner from Biggs Air Force Base, Texas where it had been one of the three squadrons of the 95th Bombardment Wing. The wing did not become fully operational until 1 June 1960 when the 919th Air Refueling Squadron, flying Boeing KC-135 Stratotankers moved to Turner from Carswell Air Force Base, Texas. Starting in 1960, one third of the squadron's aircraft were maintained on fifteen-minute alert, fully fueled and ready for combat to reduce vulnerability to a Soviet missile strike. This was increased to half the squadron's aircraft in 1962. The 4138th (and later the 484th) continued to maintain an alert commitment until deploying to Andersen Air Force Base Guam to support combat operations in Southeast Asia. In 1962, the wing's bombers began to be equipped with the GAM-77 Hound Dog and the GAM-72 Quail air-launched cruise missiles, The 4138th Airborne Missile Maintenance Squadron was activated in November to maintain these missiles. However, SAC strategic wings could not carry a permanent history or lineage and SAC looked for a way to make its Strategic Wings permanent.

484th Bombardment Wing

In 1962, in order to perpetuate the lineage of many currently inactive bombardment units with illustrious World War II records, Headquarters SAC received authority from Headquarters USAF to discontinue its Major Command controlled (MAJCON) strategic wings that were equipped with combat aircraft and to activate Air Force controlled (AFCON) units, most of which were inactive at the time which could carry a lineage and history. (Note: MAJCON units could not carry a permanent history or lineage Ravenstein, p 12.) As a result, the 4138th was replaced by the newly constituted 484th Bombardment Wing, Heavy, which assumed its mission, personnel, and equipment on 1 February 1963. Although the 484th Wing was a new organization, it continued, through temporary bestowal, the history, and honors of the World War II 484th Bombardment Group. (Note: It was also entitled to retain the honors (but not the history or lineage) of the 4138th. This temporary bestowal ended in January 1984, when the wing and group were consolidated into a single unit.)

In the same way the 824th Bombardment Squadron, one of the unit's World War II historical bomb squadrons, replaced the 336th. The 822d Medical Group, 62d Munitions Maintenance Squadron and the 919th Air Refueling Squadron were reassigned to the 484th. Component support units were replaced by units with numerical designation of the newly established wing. Under the Dual Deputate organization, all flying and maintenance squadrons were directly assigned to the wing, so no operational group element was activated. The 4138th's support group and maintenance squadrons were replaced by ones with the 484th numerical designation of the newly established wing. Each of the new units assumed the personnel, equipment, and mission of its predecessor.

The 484th wing trained for strategic bombardment and undertook air refueling operations to meet the operational commitments of SAC. On 13 January 1964, a B-52D bomber attached to the wing crashed near Cumberland, Maryland. From 1 April 1966 to c. 29 September 1966, all wing aircraft, crews, all wing headquarters personnel and most wing support personnel were deployed as part of the 3d Air Division for combat operations over Vietnam.

In April 1966, B-52Ds of the wing, together with D series bombers of the 28th Bombardment Wing deployed to Andersen Air Force Base, Guam, replacing the B-52Fs that SAC had been deploying to Andersen for the Vietnam War since the previous year. The 484th's planes and other B-52Ds had been modified under a program called Big Belly, which increased the bombload of wing aircraft to 84 500lb bombs or 42 750lb bombs, from the 27 it could previously carry. From this point, the Big Belly B-52D became the SAC workhorse in Southeast Asia.

By 1967, Intercontinental ballistic missiles had been deployed and become operational as part of the United States' strategic triad, and the need for B-52s had been reduced. In addition, funds were also needed to cover the costs of combat operations in Indochina. The 484th Bombardment Wing was inactivated on 25 March 1967 and its aircraft were reassigned to other SAC units. As part of the inactivation, Turner AFB was closed; the property was transferred to the United States Navy and being redesignated as Naval Air Station Albany.

=== Operation Iraqi Freedom ===
In 2003, the wing was converted to provisional status as the 484th Air Expeditionary Wing and activated as part of Operation Iraqi Freedom (OIF). The role of the 484th AEW was to provide a centralized command and control element to support all Tactical Air Control Parties and Combat Weather Teams operating in the Southwest Asia theater of operations. It provided combat enabling, contingency response, terminal attack and combat weather support to the coalition air forces and special forces and Army maneuver units on the battlefield. It was headquartered at Prince Sultan Air Base, Saudi Arabia (24 January 2003 – later in 2003).

The wing consisted of six groups (the 3rd, 4th and 18th Expeditionary Air Support Operations Groups, a Mission Support Group, a Maintenance Group, and a Medical Group) and about 3,400 personnel. Operations during OEF included a joint airborne assault with the 86th Contingency Response Group from Ramstein Air Base, Germany that included twenty airmen from the wing parachuting into northern Iraq with more than 1,000 soldiers of the Army's 173rd Airborne Brigade. Their skills helped prepare and open an airfield for C-17 Globemaster IIIs that delivered more than 1 million pounds of people and cargo every night into the operations area.

Approximately 500 forward air controllers were provided by the wing's air support operations groups to Army ground forces during OEF, and airmen from the 484th accompanied U.S. forces when they entered the streets of Baghdad in March 2003.

Comments by Major Birch in his Air University paper strongly suggest that the 484th AEW was a temporary organization created specifically for the Iraq campaign and that the wing was inactivated after the invasion had been successful.

== Lineage ==
484th Bombardment Group

- Constituted as the 484th Bombardment Group (Heavy) on 14 September 1943

Activated on 20 September 1943
Redesignated 484th Bombardment Group, Heavy on 28 January 1944
Redesignated 484th Bombardment Group (Pathfinder) on 14 February 1944
Redesignated 484th Bombardment Group, Heavy on 11 November 1944
Inactivated on 25 July 1945

- Consolidated on 31 January 1984 with the 484th Bombardment Wing as the 484th Bombardment Wing

484th Wing

- Constituted as the 484th Bombardment Wing Heavy on 15 November 1962 and activated (not organized)

Organized on 1 February 1963
Discontinued and inactivated, on 25 March 1967.

- Consolidated on 31 January 1984 with the 484th Bombardment Group (remained inactive)
- Redesignated as 484th Air Expeditionary Wing, and converted to provisional status: 13 January 2003

Activated on 24 January 2003
Inactivated in April 2003

=== Assignments ===
- Second Air Force, 20 September 1943 (attached to: 17th Bombardment Operational Training Wing, 20 September – November 1943)
- 49th Bombardment Wing, ca. 14 March 1944
- North African Division, Air Transport Command, 25 May 1945 – 25 July 1945
- Strategic Air Command, 15 November 1962 (not organized)
- 822d Air Division, 1 February 1963
- 823d Air Division, 2 September 1966 – 25 March 1967.
- Air Combat Command (attached to United States Air Forces Central), 24 January 2003 – Apr 2003

=== Components ===
Groups

- 18th Expeditionary Air Support Operations Group, 24 January 2003 – Apr 2003
- 4th Expeditionary Air Support Operations Group, 24 January 2003 – Apr 2003
- 3d Expeditionary Air Support Operations Group, 24 January 2003 – Apr 2003
- 484th Combat Support Group (later 484th Expeditionary Mission Support Group), 1 February 1963 – 25 March 1967, 24 January 2003 – Apr 2003
- 484th Expeditionary Maintenance Group, 24 January 2003 – Apr 2003
- 484th Expeditionary Medical Group, 24 January 2003 – Apr 2003
- 822d Medical Group, 1 February 1963 – 25 March 1967

Operational Squadrons

- 824th Bombardment Squadron: 20 September 1943 – 25 July 1945; 1 February 1963 – 25 January 1967 (not operational, 1 April–c. 29 September 1966)
- 825th Bombardment Squadron: 20 September 1943 – 25 July 1945
- 826th Bombardment Squadron: 20 September 1943 – 25 July 1945
- 827th Bombardment Squadron: 20 September 1943 – 25 July 1945
- 919th Air Refueling Squadron: 1 February 1963 – 25 March 1967 (not operational, 1 April–c. 29 September 1966).

Maintenance Squadrons

- 484th Airborne Missile Maintenance Squadron, 1 February 1963 – unknown
- 484th Armament & Electronics Maintenance Squadron, 1 February 1963 – 25 March 1967
- 484th Field Maintenance Squadron, 1 February 1963 – 25 March 1967
- 484th Organizational Maintenance Squadron, 1 February 1963 – 25 March 1967

=== Stations ===
- Harvard Army Air Field, Nebraska, 20 September 1943 – 2 March 1944
- Camp Patrick Henry, Virginia, 4 March 1944 – 13 March 1944 (ground echelon)
- Djedeida, Tunisia, 27 March 1944 (air echelon)
- Torretta Airfield, Italy, 9 April 1944 (ground echelon), 14 April 1944 (air echelon)
- Casablanca Airfield, French Morocco, c. 25 May 1945 – 25 July 1945
- Turner Air Force Base, Georgia, 1 February 1963 – 25 March 1967
- Prince Sultan Air Base, Saudi Arabia, 2003
- Al Udeid Air Base, Qatar, 2003

=== Aircraft ===
- Consolidated B-24 Liberator, 1943–1945
- Boeing B-52 Stratofortress, 1963–1966, 1966–1967
- Boeing KC-135 Stratotanker, 1963–1966, 1966–1967.

== See also ==
- List of B-52 Units of the United States Air Force
- List of MAJCOM wings of the United States Air Force
