= 825th Bombardment Squadron =

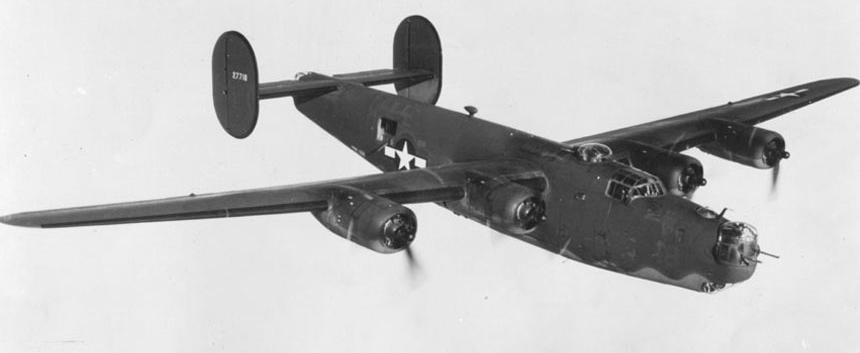
- B-24 Liberator as flown by the squadron
- Active: 1943-1945
- Country: United States
- Branch: United States Air Force
- Role: heavy bomber
- Engagements: Mediterranean Theater of Operations
- Decorations: Distinguished Unit Citation

Insignia
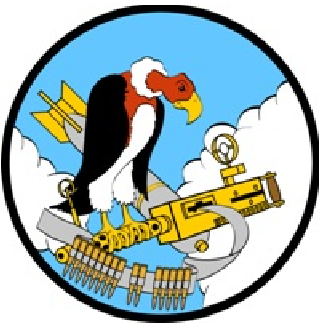
- 825th Bombardment Sq emblem

The 825th Bombardment Squadron is an inactive United States Air Force unit. It was assigned to the 484th Bombardment Group and was last stationed at Casablanca Airport, French Morocco, where it was inactivated on 25 July 1945. The squadron was activated during World War II as a Consolidated B-24 Liberator unit. It served in combat in the Mediterranean Theater of Operations, earning two Distinguished Unit Citations for operations over Germany and Austria. Following V-E Day it operated with Air Transport Command in returning American troops to the United States until it was inactivated in theater in the summer of 1945.

== History ==
The 825th Bombardment Squadron was first activated at Harvard Army Air Field, Nebraska on 20 September 1943 as one of the four squadrons of the 484th Bombardment Group. The squadron trained with Consolidated B-24 Liberators until March 1944, when it moved to the Mediterranean Theater of Operations. Shortly before deploying, the squadron was redesignated as a Pathfinder unit, although it never performed pathfinder missions. (Note: Pathfinder units were equipped with early radar bombing equipment and were intended to be deployed to other bombardment groups to act as lead aircraft on bombing missions where cloud cover obscured the target. The Army Air Forces formed one group in England, but eventually elected to train selected crews in each of its groups for this mission. Freeman, pp. 117-118.)

In April 1944, the squadron began flying combat missions from Torretto Airfield, Italy in the strategic bombing campaign against Germany. Until the end of the war, it acted primarily as a strategic bombing organization, attacking oil refineries and storage facilities, industrial facilities and lines of communication in Italy, France, Germany, Austria, Czechoslovakia, Hungary and the Balkans. On 13 June 1944, the unit's target was marshalling yards near Munich, Germany. However, the Germans deployed a smoke screen that effectively hid the target, making the attack unfeasible. Despite losses from flak and interceptor aircraft, the squadron proceeded to its secondary target at Innsbruck, Austria. Its persistence in the face of opposition earned the unit a Distinguished Unit Citation (DUC).

Two months later, on 21 August 1944, the squadron received a second DUC for an attack on underground oil storage facilities near Vienna, Austria. Without fighter escort, the squadron fought its way through intense opposition to strike the target.

The squadron was sometimes diverted from strategic targets. It bombed bridges, viaducts, marshalling yards, and supply dumps to assist troops advancing on Rome between April and July 1944. In September 1944, the unit transported petroleum products to troops participating in Operation Dragoon, the invasion of southern France. At the end of the war it supported Operation Grapeshot, the final advances in northern Italy.

Following V-E Day, The unit was assigned to Air Transport Command, It used its B-24s as transport aircraft, flying personnel from locations in France and Italy to Casablanca, French Morocco as part of the Green Project. It also engaged in transport operations from North Africa to the Azores or Dakar in French West Africa until it was inactivated on 25 July 1945.

== Lineage ==
- Constituted as the 825th Bombardment Squadron (Heavy) on 14 September 1943

Activated on 20 September 1943
Redesignated 825th Bombardment Squadron (Pathfinder) on 14 February 1944
Redesignated 825th Bombardment Squadron, Heavy on 11 November 1944
Inactivated on 25 July 1945

=== Assignments ===
- 484th Bombardment Group, 20 September 1943 – 25 July 1945

=== Stations ===
- Harvard Army Air Field, Nebraska, 20 September 1943 – 2 March 1944
- Torretto Airfield, Italy, April 1944
- Casablanca-Anfa Airport, French Morocco, c. 25 May – 25 July 1945

=== Aircraft ===
- Consolidated B-24 Liberator, 1943–1945

=== Awards and campaigns ===
Award streamer	Award	Dates	Notes
	Distinguished Unit Citation	13 June 1944	Munich, Germany and Innsbruck, Austria
	Distinguished Unit Citation	22 August 1944	Vienna, Austria

Campaign Streamer	Campaign	Dates	Notes
	Air Offensive, Europe	April 1944–5 June 1944	
	Central Europe	April 1944–21 May 1945	
	Air Combat, EAME Theater	April 1944–11 May 1945	
	Rome-Arno	April 1944–9 September 1944	
	Normandy	6 June 1944 – 24 July 1944	
	Northern France	25 July 1944 – 14 September 1944	
	Southern France	15 August 1944 – 14 September 1944	
	North Apennines	10 September 1944 – 4 April 1945	
	Rhineland	15 September 1944 – 21 March 1945	
	Po Valley	3 April 1945 – 8 May 1945	

== See also ==
- B-24 Liberator units of the United States Army Air Forces
