= 827th Bombardment Squadron =

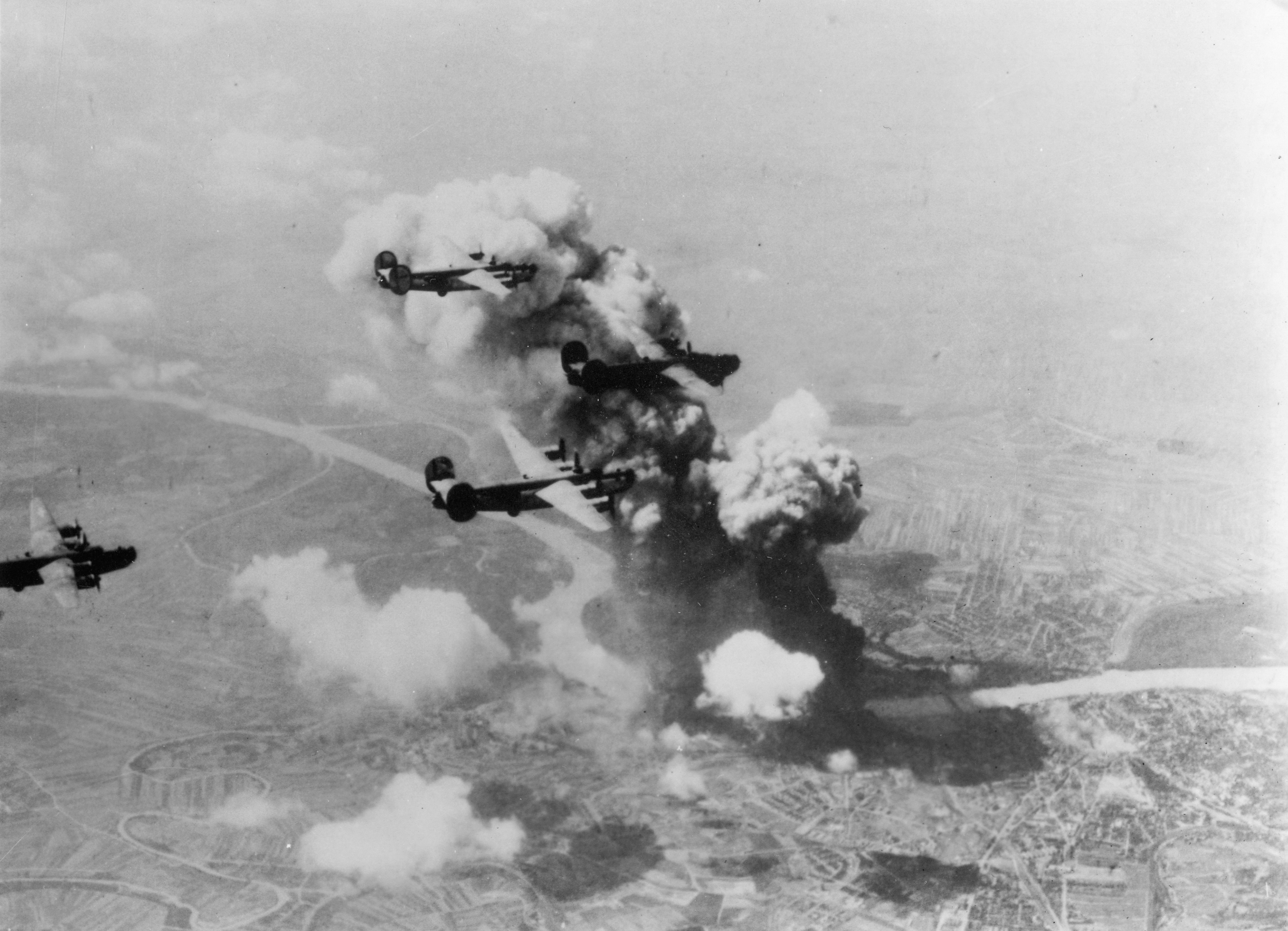
- Fifteenth Air Force B-24 Liberators over a target in 1944
- Active: 1941-1945
- Country: United States
- Branch: United States Air Force
- Role: heavy bomber
- Engagements: Antisubmarine Campaign; Mediterranean Theater of Operations
- Decorations: Distinguished Unit Citation

Insignia
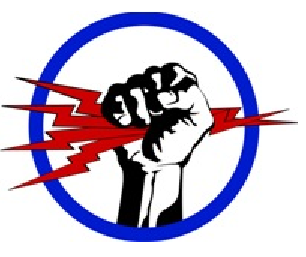
- 827th Bombardment Squadron Emblem (Note: Approved 11 July 1942. Description: On a white disc, encircled by a blue annulet, issuant from base, a dexter arm from the wrist grasping a four pronged thunderbolt extending across and over the annulet.)

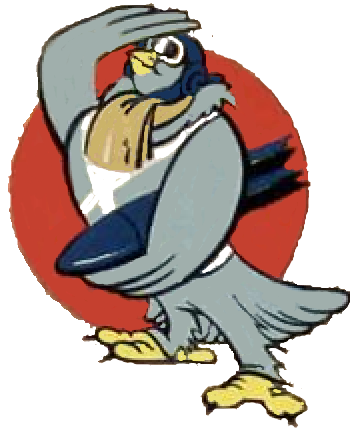
- Early 41st Bombardment Squadron emblem

The 827th Bombardment Squadron is a former United States Army Air Forces unit. It was last assigned to the 484th Bombardment Group at Casablanca Airport, French Morocco, where it was inactivated on 25 July 1945.

The squadron was first activated as the 41st Bombardment Squadron as the United States expanded its military following the outbreak of World War II. Following the attack on Pearl Harbor, the squadron performed antisubmarine warfare missions off the Atlantic coast of the United States, and was redesignated as the 5th Antisubmarine Squadron.

After the Army Air Forces antisubmarine mission was transferred to the Navy, the squadron acted as the cadre for a new Consolidated B-24 Liberator group as the 827th Bombardment Squadron. It served in combat in the Mediterranean Theater of Operations, where it participated in the strategic bombing campaign against Germany. It earned two Distinguished Unit Citations for operations over Germany and Austria. Following V-E Day it operated with Air Transport Command, returning American troops to the United States until it was inactivated in theater in 1945.

== History ==
=== Organization and antisubmarine warfare ===
The squadron was first activated at Langley Field, Virginia in January 1941 as the 41st Bombardment Squadron, one of the original squadrons of the 13th Bombardment Group. The squadron was equipped with a mix of Douglas B-18 Bolos and North American B-25 Mitchells. In June, the 41st and its parent group moved to Orlando Army Air Base, Florida.

After the attack on Pearl Harbor, the squadron was ordered to search for German U-boats off the southeast coast. Although the Navy was responsible for long range patrolling, it lacked the aircraft to perform the mission and the Army Air Forces (AAF) performed the mission, even though its crews lacked proper training. As antisubmarine warfare assets were realigned to meet the growing threat in the North Atlantic, the 13th Group moved to Westover Field, Massachusetts.

In October 1942, the AAF organized its antisubmarine forces into the single Army Air Forces Antisubmarine Command, which established the 25th Antisubmarine Wing the following month to control its forces operating over the Atlantic. Its bombardment group headquarters, including the 13th, were inactivated and the squadron, now designated the 5th Antisubmarine Squadron, was assigned directly to the 25th Wing. In July 1943, the AAF and Navy reached an agreement to transfer the coastal antisubmarine mission to the Navy. This mission transfer also included an exchange of AAF long-range bombers equipped for antisubmarine warfare for Navy Consolidated B-24 Liberators without such equipment.

=== Combat in the Mediterranean ===
After the Navy assumed full responsibility for the antisubmarine mission in August 1943, the squadron moved to Harvard Army Air Field, Nebraska, where it was redesignated the 827th Bombardment Squadron, and formed the cadre for the 484th Bombardment Group, a Consolidated B-24 Liberator heavy bombardment group. The squadron trained with Liberators until March 1944, when it moved to the Mediterranean Theater of Operations. Shortly before deploying, the squadron was redesignated as a Pathfinder unit, although it never performed pathfinder missions. (Note: Pathfinder units were equipped with early radar bombing equipment and were intended to be deployed to other bombardment groups to act as lead aircraft on bombing missions where cloud cover obscured the target. The Army Air Forces formed one group in England, but eventually elected to train selected crews in each of its groups for this mission. Freeman, pp. 117-118.)

In April 1944, the squadron began flying combat missions from Torretto Airfield, Italy in the strategic bombing campaign against Germany. Until the end of the war, it acted primarily as a strategic bombing organization, attacking oil refineries and storage facilities, industrial facilities and lines of communication in Italy, France, Germany, Austria, Czechoslovakia, Hungary and the Balkans. On 13 June 1944, the unit's target was marshalling yards near Munich, Germany. However, the Germans deployed a smoke screen that effectively hid the target, making the attack unfeasible. Despite losses from flak and interceptor aircraft, the squadron proceeded to its secondary target at Innsbruck, Austria. Its persistence in the face of opposition earned the unit a Distinguished Unit Citation.

Two months later, on 21 August 1944, the squadron received a second DUC for an attack on underground oil storage facilities near Vienna, Austria. Without fighter escort, the squadron fought its way through intense opposition to strike the target.

The squadron was sometimes diverted from strategic targets. It bombed bridges, viaducts, marshalling yards, and supply dumps to assist troops advancing on Rome between April and July 1944. In September 1944, the unit transported petroleum products to troops participating in Operation Dragoon, the invasion of southern France. At the end of the war it supported Operation Grapeshot, the final advances in northern Italy.

Following V-E Day, The unit was assigned to Air Transport Command, It used its B-24s as transport aircraft, flying personnel from locations in France and Italy to Casablanca, French Morocco. It also engaged in transport operations from North Africa to the Azores or Dakar in French West Africa until it was inactivated on 25 July 1945.

== Lineage ==
- Constituted as the 41st Bombardment Squadron (Medium) on 20 November 1940

Activated on 15 January 1941
Redesignated 5th Antisubmarine Squadron (Heavy) on 29 November 1942
Redesignated 827th Bombardment Squadron (Heavy) on 1 October 1943
Redesignated: 827th Bombardment Squadron (Pathfinder) on 14 February 1944
Redesignated: 827th Bombardment Squadron, Heavy on 11 November 1944
Inactivated on 25 July 1945

=== Assignments ===
- 13th Bombardment Group: 15 January 1941
- 25th Antisubmarine Wing: c. 30 November 1942
- 484th Bombardment Group: 1 October 1943 - 25 July 1945

=== Stations ===
- Langley Field, Virginia, 15 January 1941
- Orlando Army Air Base, Florida, 7 June 1941
- Westover Field, Massachusetts, 25 January 1942
- Mountain Home Army Air Field, Idaho, 24 September 1942
- Harvard Army Airfield, Nebraska, 1 October 1943 - 2 March 1944
- Torretto Airfield, Italy, 8 April 1944
- Casablanca-Anfa Airport, French Morocco, 25 May 1945 - 25 July 1945

=== Aircraft ===
- Douglas B-18 Bolo, 1941
- North American B-25 Mitchell, 1941-1943
- Lockheed A-29 Hudson, 1942-1943
- Consolidated B-24 Liberator, 1943–1945

=== Awards and campaigns ===
Award streamer	Award	Dates	Notes
	Distinguished Unit Citation	13 June 1944	Munich, Germany and Innsbruck, Austria 827th Bombardment Squadron
	Distinguished Unit Citation	22 August 1944	Vienna, Austria 827th Bombardment Squadron

Campaign Streamer	Campaign	Dates	Notes
	Antisubmarine	7 December 1941 – 1 August 1943	41st Bombardment Squadron (later 5th Antisubmarine Squadron)
	Air Offensive, Europe	April 1944–5 June 1944	827th Bombardment Squadron
	Central Europe	April 1944–21 May 1945	827th Bombardment Squadron
	Air Combat, EAME Theater	April 1944–11 May 1945	827th Bombardment Squadron
	Rome-Arno	April 1944–9 September 1944	827th Bombardment Squadron
	Normandy	6 June 1944 – 24 July 1944	827th Bombardment Squadron
	Northern France	25 July 1944 – 14 September 1944	827th Bombardment Squadron
	Southern France	15 August 1944 – 14 September 1944	827th Bombardment Squadron
	North Apennines	10 September 1944 – 4 April 1945	827th Bombardment Squadron
	Rhineland	15 September 1944 – 21 March 1945	827th Bombardment Squadron
	Po Valley	3 April 1945 – 8 May 1945	827th Bombardment Squadron

== See also ==
- B-24 Liberator units of the United States Army Air Forces
