= 13th Air Expeditionary Group =

United States Air Force unit

13th Air Expeditionary Group

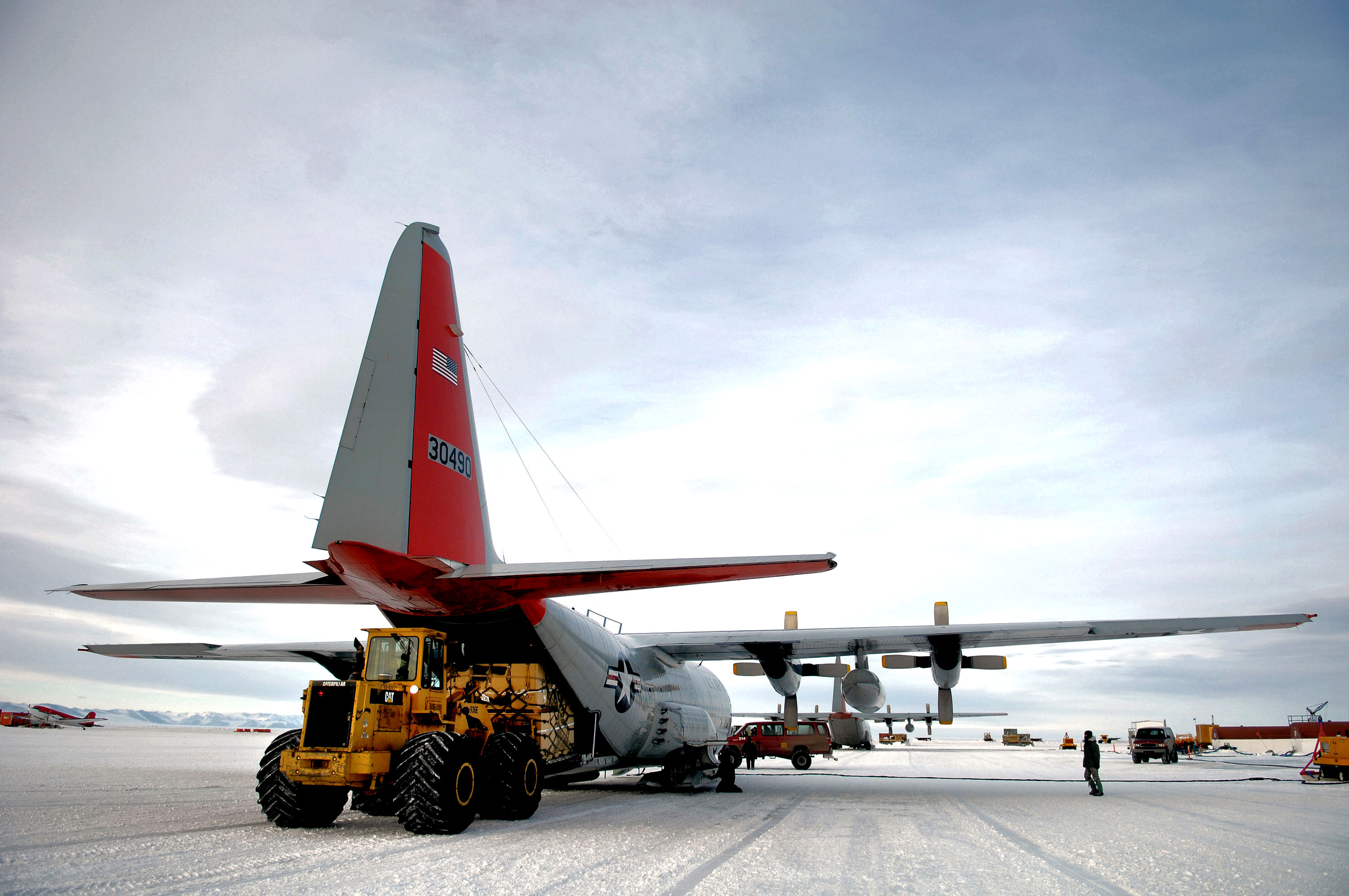
- An LC-130 Hercules is unloaded on the ice runway near McMurdo Station, Antarctica, during Operation Deep Freeze.
- Active: 1941–1942; after 2003
- Country: United States
- Branch: United States Air Force
- Role: Command of expeditionary forces
- Motto: Alert Day or Night
- Engagements: Antisubmarine Campaign

Insignia
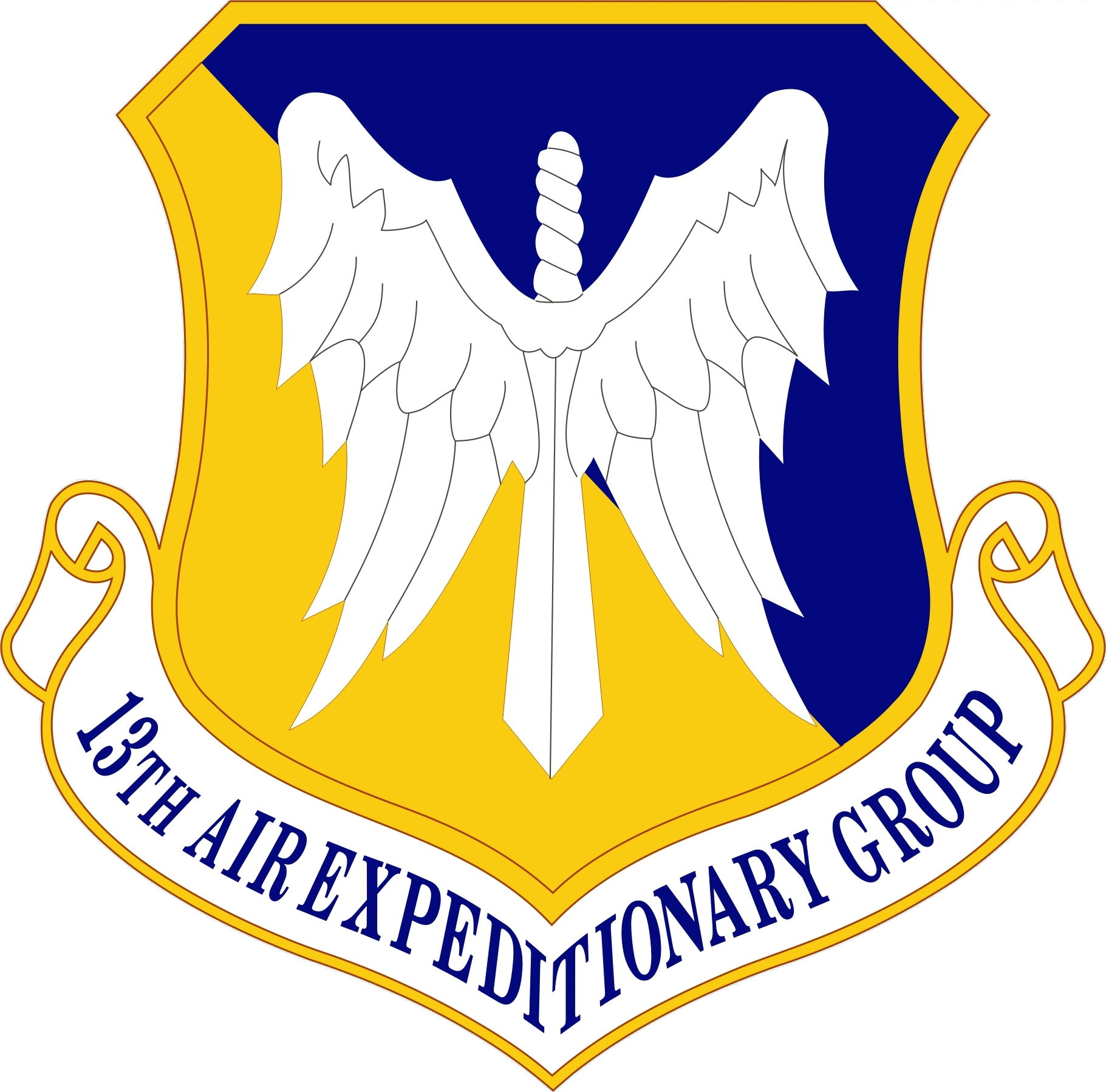
- 13th Air Expeditionary Group emblem

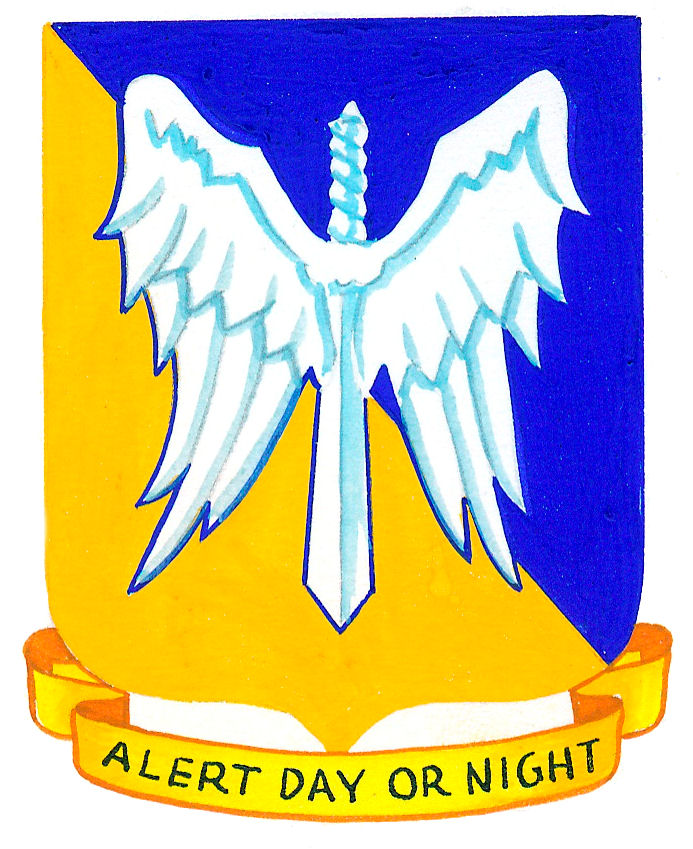
- 13th Bombardment Group emblem (Note: Approved 2 January 1942.)

The 13th Air Expeditionary Group is a provisional United States Air Force unit. As a provisional unit, it is temporarily activated to meet immediate needs or requirements. The 13th Air Expeditionary Group is activated to control operations or exercises for the Thirteenth Air Force, including acting as the air component of Joint Task Force-Support Forces Antarctica (JTF-STA).

== History ==
=== World War II ===
The group was first activated at Langley Field, Virginia in January 1941 as the 13th Bombardment Group, with the 39th, 40th, and 41st Bombardment Squadrons assigned and the 3d Reconnaissance Squadron attached. The group was equipped with a mix of Douglas B-18 Bolos and North American B-25 Mitchells. In June, the group moved to Orlando Army Air Base, Florida.

After the attack on Pearl Harbor, the group was ordered to search for German U-boats off the southeast coast. Although the Navy was responsible for long range patrolling, it lacked the aircraft to perform the mission and the Army Air Forces (AAF) performed the mission, even though its crews lacked proper training. As antisubmarine warfare assets were realigned to meet the growing threat in the North Atlantic, the 13th Group moved to Westover Field, Massachusetts in January 1942. The following month, the 3d Reconnaissance Squadron was assigned to the group, and, in April, became the 393d Bombardment Squadron.

In October 1942, the AAF organized its antisubmarine forces into the single Army Air Forces Antisubmarine Command, which established the 25th Antisubmarine Wing the following month to control its forces operating over the Atlantic. Its bombardment group headquarters, including the 13th, were inactivated.

=== Expeditionary operations ===
The group was converted to provisional status, redesignated the 13th Air Expeditionary Group and assigned to Pacific Air Forces to activate or inactivate as needed. It has been used primarily to control operations or exercises for Thirteenth Air Force. This has included acting as the air component of Joint Task Force-Support Forces Antarctica. The group commander is dual hatted as the deputy commander, JTF-SFA.

== Lineage ==
- Constituted as the 13th Bombardment Group (Medium) on 20 November 1940

Inactivated on 30 November 1942

- Redesignated 13th Air Expeditionary Group and converted to provisional status

Activated 2 October 2003
Inactivated 31 October 2003
Activated 2 February 2004 for Exercise Balikatan 04
Inactivated 1 April 2004
Activated 5 February 2004 for Exercise Cope Tiger 04
Inactivated 9 March 2004
Activated 11 January 2005 for Exercise Cope Tiger 05
Inactivated 8 February 2005
Activated 30 January 2006 for Exercise Cope Tiger 06
Inactivated c. February 2006
Activated c. January 2007 for Exercise Cope Tiger 07
Inactivated 13 February 07
Activated 10 June 2007 for Exercise Talisman Saber 07
Inactivated c. June 2007
Activated 18 August 2007 for Exercise Pacific Airlift Rally 07
Inactivated 26 August 2007
Active for Operation Deep Freeze c. 30 November 2007
Activated 11 January 2008 for Exercise Balikatan 08
Inactivated 31 March 2008
Activated 14 January 2008 for Exercise Cope Tiger 08
Inactivated 13 February 08
Activated c. March 2009 for Exercise Cope Tiger 09
Inactivated 3 April 2009
Activated 1 February 2010 for Exercise Balikatan Sagip 10
Inactivated 24 February 2010
Activated 24 February 2010 for Exercise Cope Tiger 10
Inactivated 16 March 2010
Active c. 8 November 2010
Activated 7 March 2012 for Exercise Cope Tiger 11
Inactivated 4 April 2012
Activated 9 April 2012 for Exercise Balikatan 2012
Inactivated 30 April 2012
Active c. 12 November 2015

=== Assignments ===
- First Air Force, 15 January 1941
- I Bomber Command, 6 June 1941
- Army Air Forces Antisubmarine Command, 15 October–November 1942
- Pacific Air Forces to activate or inactivate as needed

Attached to Thirteenth Air Force, 2 October 2003 – 31 October 2003
Attached to Thirteenth Air Force, 2 February 2004 – 1 April 2004
Attached to Thirteenth Air Force, 5 February 2004 – 9 March 2004
Attached to Thirteenth Air Force, 11 January 2005 – 8 February 2005
13th Air Expeditionary Task Force, 30 January 2006-c. February 2006
13th Air Expeditionary Task Force, c. January 2007 – 13 February 2007
Attached to Thirteenth Air Force, 10 June 2007-c. June 2007
13th Air Expeditionary Task Force, 18 August 2007 – 26 August 2007
Attached to Thirteenth Air Force, 11 January 2008 – 31 March 2008
13th Air Expeditionary Wing, 14 January 2008 – 13 February 2008
Joint Task Force-Support Forces Antarctica c. 30 November 2008
13th Air Expeditionary Wing, c. March 2009-3 April 2009
Attached to Thirteenth Air Force, 1 February 2010 – 24 February 2010
13th Air Expeditionary Wing, 24 February 2010 – 16 March 2010
Joint Task Force-Support Forces Antarctica c. 8 November 2010
13th Air Expeditionary Wing, 7 March 2012 – 4 April 2012
Attached to Thirteenth Air Force, 9 April 2012– 30 April 2012
Joint Task Force-Support Forces Antarctica c. 12 November 2015

=== Components ===
- 39th Bombardment Squadron: 15 January 1941 – 30 November 1942
- 40th Bombardment Squadron: 15 January 1941 – 30 November 1942

An air echelon was attached to the Caribbean Sea Frontier, United States Navy, 30 August – 9 October 1942 and 16 October – 15 November 1942
An air echelon was attached to the 99th Bombardment Squadron, 9–16 October 1942

- 41st Bombardment Squadron: 15 January 1941 – 30 November 1942
- 3d Reconnaissance Squadron (later 393d Bombardment Squadron): attached 15 January 1941 – 25 February 1942, assigned 25 February – 30 November 1942
- 304th Expeditionary Airlift Squadron, c. 30 November 2007
- 139th Expeditionary Airlift Squadron, c. 30 November 2007

=== Stations ===
- Langley Field, Virginia, 15 January 1941
- Orlando Army Air Base, Florida, c. 6 June 1941
- Westover Field, Massachusetts, 20 January – 30 November 1942
- Andersen Air Force Base, Guam, 2 October 2003 – 31 October 2003
- Clark Field, Philippines, 2 February 2004 – 1 April 2004
- Korat Royal Thai Air Force Base, Thailand, 5 February 2004 – 9 March 2004
- Korat Royal Thai Air Force Base, Thailand, 11 January 2005 – 8 February 2005
- Korat Royal Thai Air Force Base, Thailand, 30 January 2006-c. February 2006
- Korat Royal Thai Air Force Base, Thailand, c. January 2007 – 13 February 2007
- Brisbane Airport, Australia, 10 June 2007-c. June 2007
- Halim Air Base, Indonesia, 18 August 2007 – 26 August 2007
- Clark International Airport, Philippines, 11 January 2008 – 31 March 2008
- Udon Thani Thailand, 14 January 2008 – 13 February 2008
- Korat Royal Thai Air Force Base, Thailand, c. March 2009-3 April 2009
- Diosdado Macapagal International Airport, Philippines, 1 February 2010 – 24 February 2010
- Udon Thani Thailand, 24 February 2010 – 16 March 2010
- Udon Thani Thailand, 7 March 2012 – 4 April 2012
- Clark Field, Philippines, 9 April 12–30 April 12
