= 819th Bombardment Squadron =

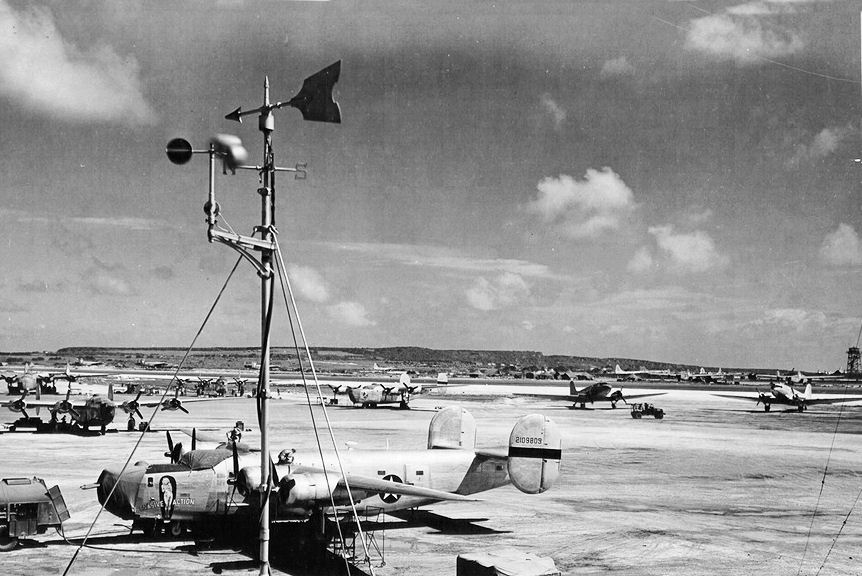
- Squadron B-24 Liberator on the ramp at East Field (Saipan) (Note: Aircraft is Consolidated B-24J-105-CO Liberator, serial 42-109809, Evasive Action. Also visible are Douglas C-47 Skytrains and, in the distance, a Boeing B-29 Superfortress. Photo taken in the fall of 1944.)
- Active: 1941–1945
- Country: United States
- Branch: United States Air Force
- Role: Heavy bomber
- Engagements: Antisubmarine Campaign; Pacific Theater of Operations

Insignia
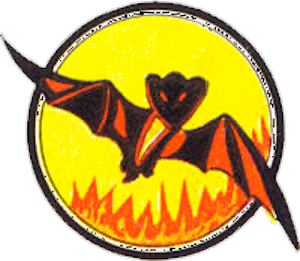
- 819th Bombardment Squadron emblem (Note: Approved 17 February 1942. Description: On and over a yellow disc with a black border a black bat, outlined in red, wings displayed, flying over a mass of red flames issuing from the lower border of the disc.)

The 819th Bombardment Squadron is an inactive United States Air Force unit. Its last assignment was with the 30th Bombardment Group at Kahuku Army Air Field, Hawaii, where it was inactivated on 30 November 1945.

The squadron was first activated in January 1941 as the 39th Bombardment Squadron. Following the attack on Pearl Harbor, the squadron performed antisubmarine patrols off the Atlantic coast, and was renamed the 3d Antisubmarine Squadron in November 1942. Following the transfer of the antisubmarine mission to the Navy in 1943, the squadron returned to the bomber mission as the 819th Bombardment Squadron and saw combat in the Pacific Ocean Theater between July 1944 and February 1945.

== History ==
=== Organization and antisubmarine warfare ===
The squadron was first activated at Langley Field, Virginia in January 1941 as the 39th Bombardment Squadron, one of the original squadrons of the 13th Bombardment Group. The squadron was equipped with a mix of Douglas B-18 Bolos and North American B-25 Mitchells. In June, the 39th and its parent group moved to Orlando Army Air Base, Florida.

After the attack on Pearl Harbor, the squadron was ordered to search for German U-boats off the southeast coast. For a brief period in December 1941, it maintained a detachment at Savannah Army Air Base, Georgia. Although the Navy was responsible for long range patrolling, it lacked the aircraft to perform the mission and the Army Air Forces (AAF) performed the mission, even though its crews lacked proper training. As antisubmarine warfare assets were realigned to meet the growing threat in the North Atlantic, the 13th Group moved to Westover Field, Massachusetts. To provide better coverage, the group's squadrons were dispersed, and the 39th moved to Dover Army Air Field, Delaware.

In October 1942, the AAF organized its antisubmarine forces into the single Army Air Forces Antisubmarine Command, which established the 25th Antisubmarine Wing the following month to control its forces operating over the Atlantic. Its bombardment group headquarters, including the 13th, were inactivated and the squadron, now designated the 3d Antisubmarine Squadron, was assigned directly to the 25th Wing. In July 1943, the AAF and Navy reached an agreement to transfer the coastal antisubmarine mission to the Navy. This mission transfer also included an exchange of AAF long-range bombers equipped for antisubmarine warfare for Navy Consolidated B-24 Liberators without such equipment.

=== Combat in the Pacific ===
With its antisubmarine mission ended, the squadron once again became a bomber unit, moving to join the 30th Bombardment Group at March Field, California as the 819th Bombardment Squadron. At March, it converted to the Consolidated B-24 Liberator and replaced the 30th Group's 21st Bombardment Squadron, which had deployed to Alaska to participate in the Aleutian Campaign in 1942. At full strength with the addition of the 819th, the 30th Group deployed to Hawaii as part of VII Bomber Command in October 1942.

The 30th Group moved forward to the Ellice Islands the following month, but the squadron remained in Hawaii until July 1944. During this period, the squadron acted as a replacement unit for the rest of the group, providing trained aircrews and replacement Liberators. The squadron moved forward to Saipan in the last week of July 1944, where the rest of the group joined it at Kobler Field in early August. From Saipan, it conducted raids on the Bonin and Volcano Islands and attacked bypassed islands in the Caroline and Mariana Islands until Iwo Jima was occupied. Its final bombing mission was at Iwo Jima on 19 February 1945, the same day three Marine divisions invaded the island.

in March 1945, the squadron returned to Wheeler Field, Hawaii, where it flew training and patrol missions until inactivating in November 1945.

== Lineage ==
- Constituted as the 39th Bombardment Squadron (Medium) on 20 November 1940

Activated on 15 January 1941
Redesignated: 3d Antisubmarine Squadron (Heavy) on 29 November 1942
Redesignated: 819th Bombardment Squadron, Heavy on 22 September 1943
Inactivated on 30 November 1945

=== Assignments ===
- 13th Bombardment Group, 15 January 1941
- 25th Antisubmarine Wing, 30 November 1942
- 30th Bombardment Group, 11 October 1943 – 30 November 1945

=== Stations ===
- Langley Field, Virginia, 15 January 1941
- Orlando Army Air Base, Florida, 6 June 1941

Detachment operated from Savannah Army Air Base, Georgia, 8–14 December 1941

- Westover Field, Massachusetts, 20 January 1942
- Dover Army Air Field, Delaware, 19 July 1942
- Fort Dix Army Air Field, New Jersey, 28 February 1943
- March Field, California, 22 September-4 October 1943
- Barking Sands Army Air Field, Hawaii, 22 October 1943
- Wheeler Field, Hawaii, 12 November 1943 – 9 July 1944
- Kobler Field, Saipan, Mariana Islands, 25 July 1944
- Wheeler Field, Hawaii, 17 March 1945
- Kahuku Army Air Field, Hawaii, 26 September-30 November 1945

=== Aircraft ===
- Douglas B-18 Bolo, 1941–1942
- North American B-25 Mitchell, 1941–1943
- Lockheed A-29 Hudson, 1942
- Consolidated B-24 Liberator, 1943–1945
