= 336th Bombardment Squadron =

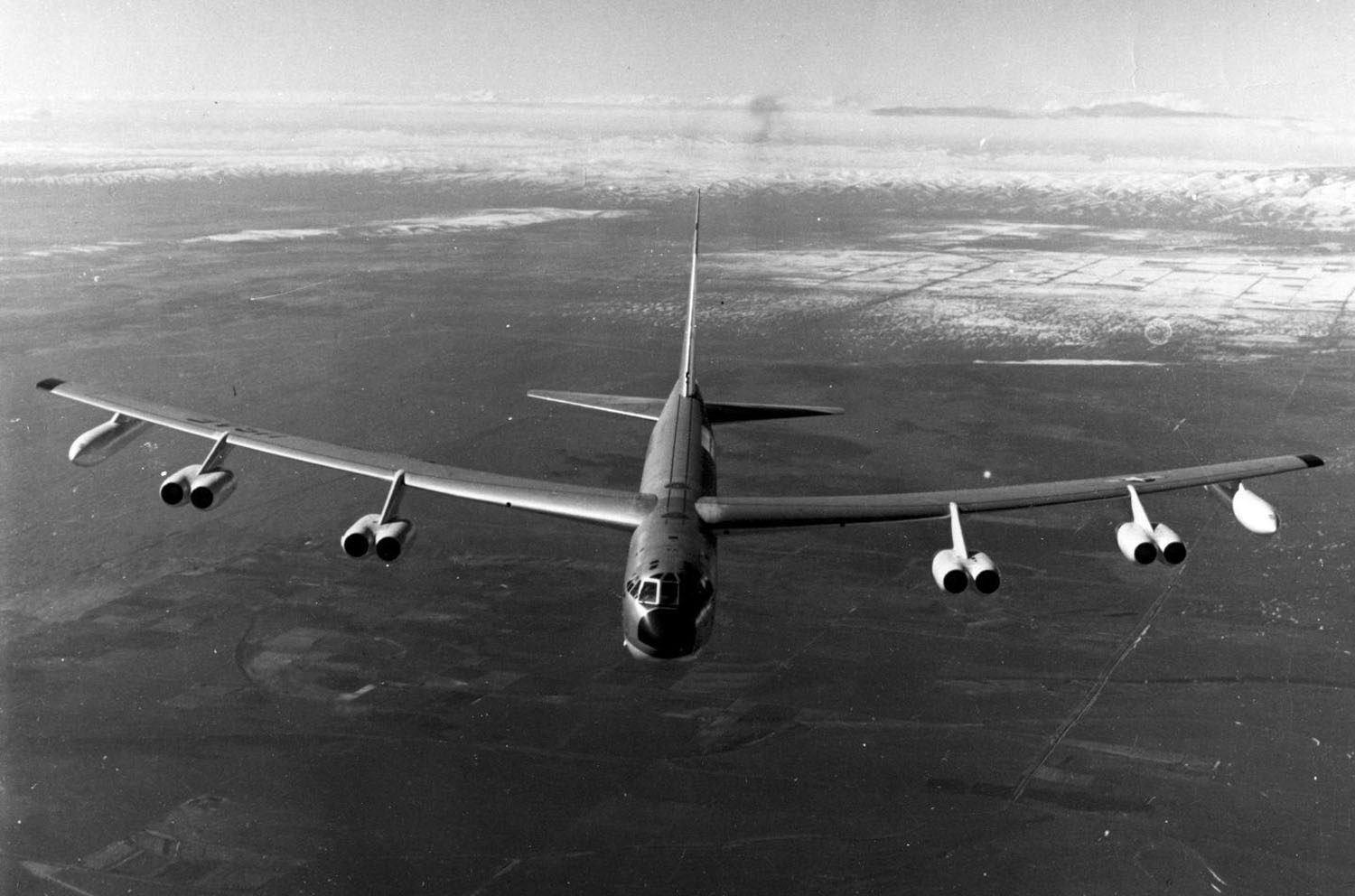
- Boeing B-52 Stratofortress as flown by the 336th Bomb Sq
- Active: 1942–1945; 1947–1949; 1952–1963
- Country: United States
- Branch: United States Air Force
- Role: Heavy bomber
- Engagements: European theater of World War II
- Decorations: Distinguished Unit Citation

Insignia
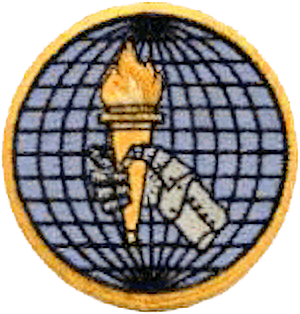
- 336th Bombardment Squadron emblem (Note: Approved 16 March 1956. Description: On a light blue sphere, bordered Air Force golden yellow, an iron glove gray, holding a torch in pale of the second [color], flamed orange and yellow, all outlines and grid lines black.)

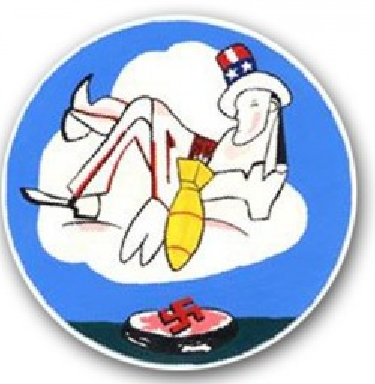
- 336th Bombardment Squadron emblem (World War II)
- World War II Squadron fuselage code (Note: After December 1944, squadrons of the 95th Bombardment Group no longer displayed their fuselage codes. Watkins, p. 42.): ET
- World War II 95th group tail code: Square B

The 336th Bombardment Squadron is an inactive United States Air Force unit. It was last assigned to the 4138th Strategic Wing at Turner Air Force Base, Georgia on 1 February 1963.

The squadron was first activated in June 1942. It saw combat in the European theater of World War II, where it was assigned to the 95th Bombardment Group, the only group in Eighth Air Force to earn three Distinguished Unit Citations.

From 1947 to 1949 the 336th Bombardment Squadron served in the reserves. It was inactivated when Continental Air Command reorganized its reserve flying units under the wing base organization model and eliminated its medium bomber units.

During the Cold War, the squadron was part of Strategic Air Command (SAC)'s 95th Bombardment Wing and performed strategic bombardment training with Convair B-36 Peacemaker bombers at Biggs Air Force Base. Texas. In 1959, as part of SAC's program to disperse its Boeing B-52 Stratofortress bombers over a larger number of bases to make them less vulnerable to a Soviet missile attack, the squadron moved to Turner Air Force Base, where it operated the B-52. It supported SAC's global commitments until 1963, when SAC replaced its strategic wings and their components with wings that continued the histories of units that had participated in combat in World War II.

== History ==
=== World War II ===
==== Training in the United States ====
The squadron was constituted in early 1942 as the 336th Bombardment Squadron before activating at Barksdale Field, Louisiana in June as one of the four original squadrons of the 95th Bombardment Group. The squadron began training in August at Geiger Field, Washington, where it was equipped with Boeing B-17 Flying Fortresses. The unit trained for combat operations until moving overseas starting in March.

The air echelon processed at Kearney Army Air Field, Nebraska and flew its Forts via the southern route, flying to Florida, Trinidad, the northern coast of Brazil, Dakar, Senegal, and Marrakesh, Morocco to RAF Alconbury in the United Kingdom. The ground echelon moved to Camp Kilmer, then sailed on the RMS Queen Elizabeth to Scotland, arriving in May. The squadron then reunited at RAF Framlingham.

==== Combat with Eighth Air Force ====
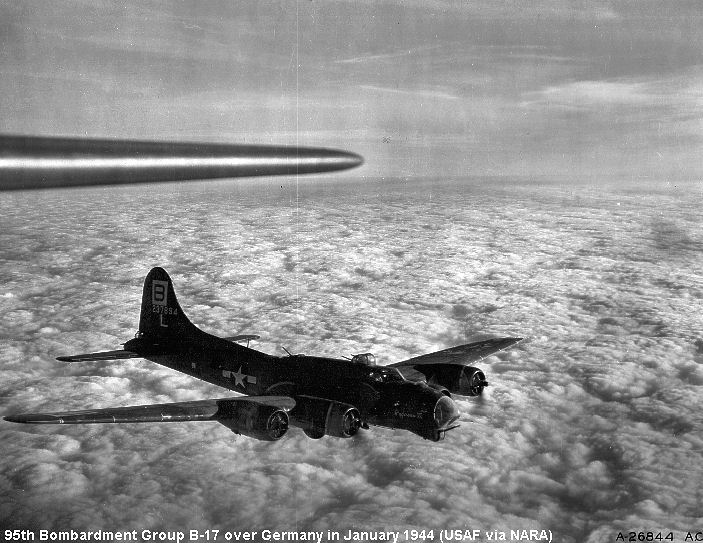
95th Bombardment Group B-17 over Germany showing Square B tail marking

The squadron arrived in England equipped with late model B-17F aircraft equipped with "Tokyo Tanks", additional fuel cells located outboard in the wings that gave this model additional range. It flew its first combat mission on 13 May 1943 against an airfield near Saint-Omer, France. For the next two months the squadron focused on attacking airfields and V-1 flying bomb launch sites in France.

Eighth Air Force's early experience with its Martin B-26 Marauders convinced it that the Marauders were stationed too far from the continent of Europe to reach a selection of targets. It determined to move them closer to the target areas, and an exchange of bases began. The entire 95th group moved to RAF Horham in June, where they replaced the 323d Bombardment Group, which departed the previous day. A few days later their place at Framlingham was taken by the newly arrived 390th Bombardment Group.

The 336th began strategic bombing operations in July and continued until flying its last operation on 20 April 1945. Its targets included harbors, marshalling yards and other industrial targets along with attacks on cities. The squadron received its first Distinguished Unit Citation (DUC) during an attack on an aircraft factory at Regensburg, Germany on 17 August 1943 when it maintained its defensive formation despite severe attacks by enemy interceptor aircraft.

On 10 October, during an attack on marshalling yards at Münster, Germany, the squadron was subjected to concentrated fighter attacks on the approach to the target and intense flak over the objective. Despite these obstacles, the formation's bombs were clustered close to the target. It was awarded a second DUC for withstanding these attacks to bomb its objective. From 20 to 25 February 1944 the squadron participated in the Big Week offensive against the German aircraft manufacturing industry. A few days later, on 4 March, the squadron attacked Berlin despite adverse weather that led other units to either abandon the operation or attack secondary targets. Despite snowstorms and heavy cloud cover, the unit struck its target while under attack from enemy fighters, although the cloud cover required the group to rely on a pathfinder from the 482d Bombardment Group to determine the release point. It received its third DUC for this operation. This mission was the first time any unit from Eighth Air Force had bombed Berlin.

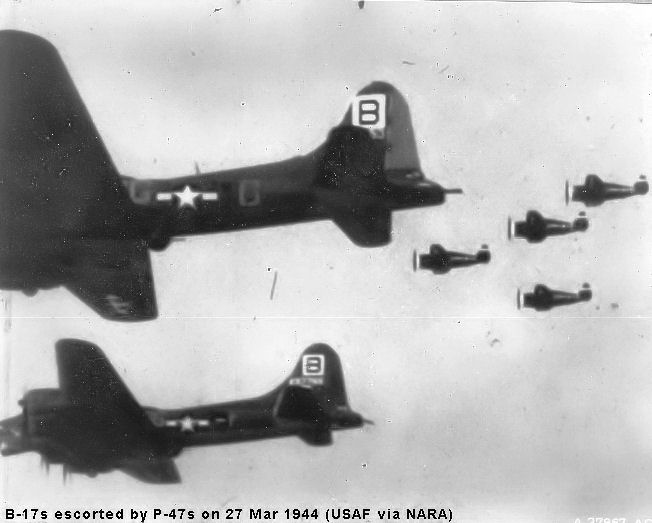
95th Bomb Group Boeing B-17Gs in combat formation

The squadron was diverted to bombing priority tactical targets during the preparation for and execution of Operation Overlord, the invasion of Normandy in June 1944, attacking communications and coastal defenses. It hit enemy troop concentrations to facilitate the Allied breakout at Saint-Lô. The 336th attacked enemy troop concentrations during the Battle of the Bulge from December 1944 to January 1945 and bombed airfields to support Operation Varsity, the airborne assault across the Rhine in March.

One of the unit's more unusual missions was flown on 18 September 1944, when the 95th group led the 13th Combat Bombardment Wing to Warsaw to drop ammunition, food and medical supplies to Polish resistance forces fighting against German occupation forces, landing at bases in the Soviet Union. The squadron had previously participated in shuttle missions to the Soviet Union.

The unit flew its last mission on 20 April 1945, when it attacked marshalling yards near Oranienburg. In the first week of May, it airdropped food to Dutch citizens in Operation Chow Hound. From V-E Day until departing the theater in June, it transported liberated prisoners of war and displaced persons. The air echelon flew their planes back to Bradley Field, Connecticut, while the ground echelon sailed once more on the Queen Elizabeth. The squadron was reunited at Sioux Falls Army Air Field, South Dakota, where it was inactivated on 28 August 1945.

=== Cold War ===
==== Air Force Reserve ====
The 336th Bombardment Squadron was reactivated as a reserve unit under Air Defense Command (ADC) at Knoxville Municipal Airport, Tennessee in May 1947, nominally as a heavy bomber unit. As the post war Air Force took shape, the National Guard was considered the first line of reserve. Reserve units got what was left over after National Guard units received facilities, equipment and aircraft. Aircraft were allotted to reserve units as a means of maintaining flying proficiency, not for combat readiness. Aircraft assigned to the reserves were overwhelmingly trainers, with a few fighters and initially no bombers. The fighters were withdrawn in December 1946, and no heavy bombers were ever assigned

In 1948 Continental Air Command assumed responsibility for managing reserve units from ADC. The 336th was inactivated when Continental Air Command reorganized its reserve units under the wing base organization system in June 1949, and retained only troop carrier and light bomber units. The squadron's personnel and equipment were transferred to elements of the 516th Troop Carrier Wing.

==== Strategic Air Command ====
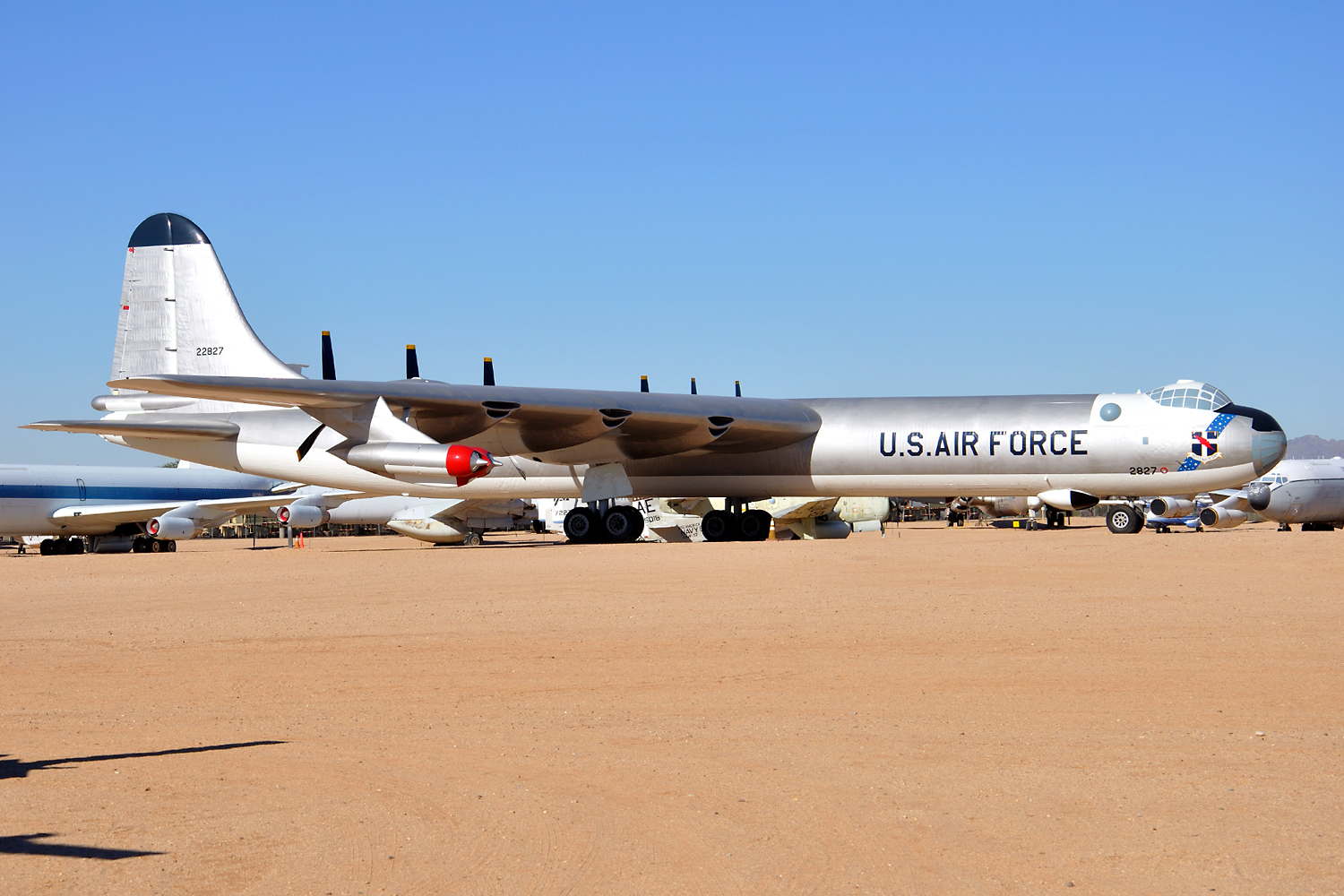
Former 95th Bomb Wing Convair B-36J Peacemaker at the Pima Air Museum (Note: Aircraft is a Convair B-36J-10-CF Peacemaker, Dear John, serial 52-2827 and was the last B-36 produced. It was retired from active service on 12 February 1959, and has been on display or in storage ever since. It has been at the Pima Museum since 2006. Dirkx, Marco (23 September 2025). "1952 USAF Serial Numbers". Joe Baugher’s Serial Number List..)

The squadron activated on 16 June 1952 at Biggs Air Force Base, Texas. However, it was minimally manned until September 1953, when it began strategic bombardment training with Convair B-36 Peacemakers. It operated in support of Strategic Air Command (SAC)'s global commitments beginning in April 1954. The squadron deployed with the entire 95th Bombardment Wing to Andersen Air Force Base, Guam from July to November 1955.

From 1959 to 1960, the 95th wing phased out its B-36s and received Boeing B-52 Stratofortresses to replace them. In the late 1950s, SAC established strategic wings to disperse its B-52s over a larger number of bases, thus making it more difficult for the Soviet Union to knock out the entire fleet with a surprise first strike. As part of this program, the squadron moved to Turner Air Force Base, Georgia in July 1959, where it was assigned to the 4138th Strategic Wing.

Starting in 1960, one third of the squadron's aircraft were maintained on fifteen-minute alert, fully fueled, armed and ready for combat to reduce vulnerability to a Soviet missile strike. This was increased to half the squadron's aircraft in 1962. The 336th continued to maintain an alert commitment until it was inactivated.

In February 1963, SAC activated the 484th Bombardment Wing at Turner. The 484th assumed the mission, aircraft, personnel and equipment of the discontinued 4138th wing. The 4138th was a Major Command controlled (MAJCON) wing, which could not carry a permanent history or lineage, and SAC wanted to replace it with a permanent unit. The 336th was inactivated and its mission, personnel and equipment were transferred to the 484th wing's 824th Bombardment Squadron.

== Lineage ==
- Constituted as the 336th Bombardment Squadron (Heavy) on 28 January 1942

Activated on 15 June 1942
Redesignated 336th Bombardment Squadron, Heavy on 20 August 1943
Inactivated on 28 August 1945
Redesignated 336th Bombardment Squadron, Very Heavy on 13 May 1947

- Activated in the reserves on 29 May 1947

Inactivated on 27 June 1949
Redesignated 336th Bombardment Squadron, Medium on 4 June 1952

- Activated on 16 June 1952

Redesignated 336th Bombardment Squadron, Heavy on 8 November 1952
Discontinued and inactivated on 1 February 1963

=== Assignments ===
- 95th Bombardment Group, 15 June 1942 – 28 August 1945
- 95th Bombardment Group, 29 May 1947 – 27 June 1949
- 95th Bombardment Wing, 16 June 1952
- 4138th Strategic Wing, 1 July 1959 – 1 February 1963

=== Stations ===
- Barksdale Field, Louisiana, 15 June 1942
- Pendleton Field, Oregon, 26 June 1942
- Geiger Field, Washington, 28 August 1942
- Ephrata Army Air Base, Washington, 31 October 1942
- Geiger Field, Washington, 24 November 1942
- Rapid City Army Air Base, South Dakota, 17 December 1942 – 11 March 1943
- RAF Framlingham (AAF-153), England, May 1943
- RAF Horham (AAF-119), England, 15 June 1943 – 19 June 1945
- Sioux Falls Army Air Field, South Dakota, c. 14 August 1945 – 28 August 1945
- Knoxville Municipal Airport, Tennessee, 29 May 1947 – 27 June 1949
- Biggs Air Force Base, Texas, 16 June 1952
- Turner Air Force Base, Georgia, 1 July 1959 – 1 February 1963

=== Aircraft ===
- Boeing B-17 Flying Fortress, 1942–1945
- Convair B-36 Peacemaker, 1953–1959
- Boeing B-52 Stratofortress, 1959–1963

=== Awards and campaigns ===
Award streamer	Award	Dates	Notes
	Distinguished Unit Citation, Regensburg, Germany	17 August 1943	
	Distinguished Unit Citation, Münster, Germany	10 October 1943	
	Distinguished Unit Citation, Berlin, Germany	4 March 1944	

Campaign Streamer	Campaign	Dates	Notes
	Air Offensive, Europe	11 May 1943 – 5 June 1944	
	Normandy	6 June 1944 – 24 July 1944	
	Northern France	25 July 1944 – 14 September 1944	
	Rhineland	15 September 1944 – 21 March 1945	
	Ardennes-Alsace	16 December 1944 – 25 January 1945	
	Central Europe	22 March 1944 – 21 May 1945	
	Air Combat, EAME Theater	11 May 1943 – 11 May 1945	

== See also ==
- B-17 Flying Fortress units of the United States Army Air Forces
- List of B-52 Units of the United States Air Force
- List of MAJCOM wings of the United States Air Force
