= 824th Bombardment Squadron =

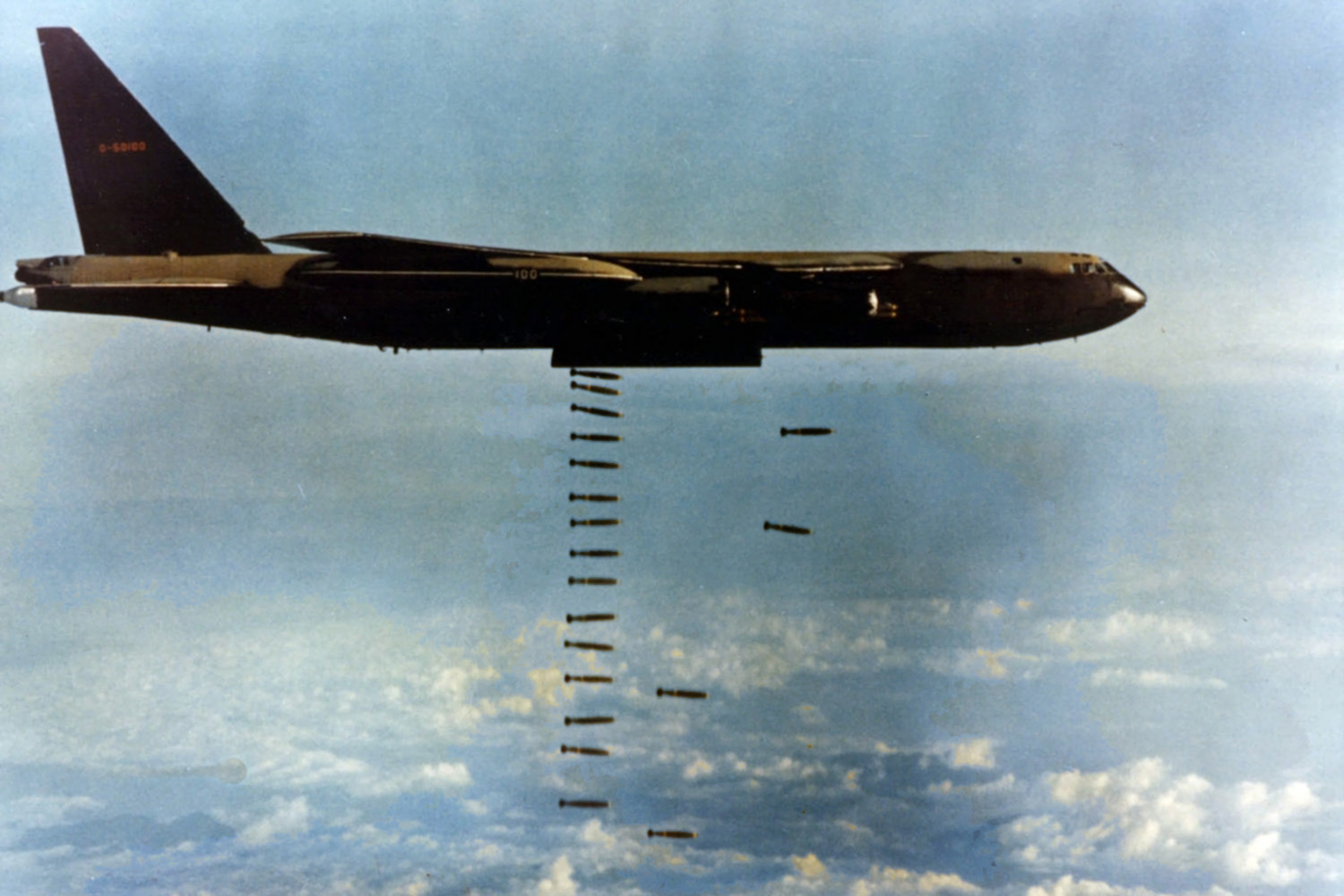
- B-52D Stratofortress as flown by the 824th
- Active: 1943–1945; 1963–1967
- Country: United States
- Branch: United States Air Force
- Role: Bombardment
- Engagements: Mediterranean Theater of Operations
- Decorations: Distinguished Unit Citation; Air Force Outstanding Unit Award

Insignia
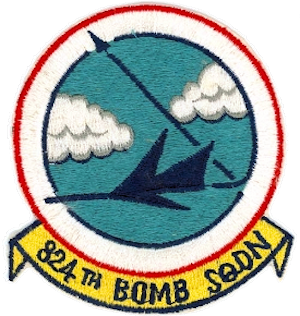
- Patch with 824th Bombardment Squadron emblem (1963-1967)

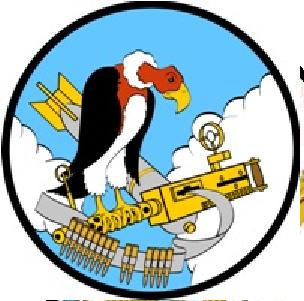
- 824th Bombardment Sq emblem (World War II)

The 824th Bombardment Squadron is an inactive United States Air Force unit. It was last assigned to the 484th Bombardment Wing at Turner Air Force Base, Georgia, where it was inactivated on 25 March 1967.

The squadron was first activated during World War II as a Consolidated B-24 Liberator unit. It served in combat in the Mediterranean Theater of Operations, where it participated in the strategic bombing campaign against Germany. It earned two Distinguished Unit Citations for operations over Germany and Austria. Following V-E Day it operated with Air Transport Command, returning American troops to the United States until it was inactivated in theater in 1945. The squadron was activated again in 1963 as a Strategic Air Command unit, and was one of the first Boeing B-52 Stratofortress units to participate in combat in the Vietnam War.

== History ==
=== World War II ===
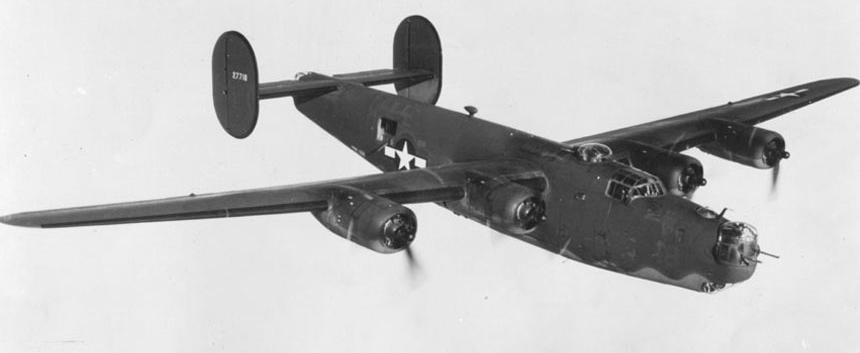
B-24 Liberator

The 824th Bombardment Squadron was first activated at Harvard Army Air Field, Nebraska on 20 September 1943 as one of the four squadrons of the 484th Bombardment Group. The squadron trained with Consolidated B-24 Liberators until March 1944, when it moved to the Mediterranean Theater of Operations. Shortly before deploying, the squadron was redesignated as a Pathfinder unit, although it never performed pathfinder missions. (Note: Pathfinder units were equipped with early radar bombing equipment and were intended to be deployed to other bombardment groups to act as lead aircraft on bombing missions where cloud cover obscured the target. The Army Air Forces formed one group in England, but eventually elected to train selected crews in each of its groups for this mission. Freeman, pp. 117-118.)

In April 1944, the squadron began flying combat missions from Torretto Airfield, Italy in the strategic bombing campaign against Germany. Until the end of the war, it acted primarily as a strategic bombing organization, attacking oil refineries and storage facilities, industrial facilities and lines of communication in Italy, France, Germany, Austria, Czechoslovakia, Hungary and the Balkans. On 13 June 1944, the unit's target was marshalling yards near Munich, Germany. However, the Germans deployed a smoke screen that effectively hid the target, making the attack unfeasible. Despite losses from flak and interceptor aircraft, the squadron proceeded to its secondary target at Innsbruck, Austria. Its persistence in the face of opposition earned the unit a Distinguished Unit Citation (DUC).

Two months later, on 21 August 1944, the squadron received a second DUC for an attack on underground oil storage facilities near Vienna, Austria. Without fighter escort, the squadron fought its way through intense opposition to strike the target.

The squadron was sometimes diverted from strategic targets. It bombed bridges, viaducts, marshalling yards, and supply dumps to assist troops advancing on Rome between April and July 1944. In September 1944, the unit transported petroleum products to troops participating in Operation Dragoon, the invasion of southern France. At the end of the war it supported Operation Grapeshot, the final advances of the Allies in northern Italy.

Following V-E Day, The unit was assigned to Air Transport Command for the Green Project. It used its B-24s as transport aircraft, flying personnel from locations in France and Italy to Casablanca, French Morocco. It also engaged in transport operations from North Africa to the Azores or Dakar in French West Africa until it was inactivated on 25 July 1945.

=== Strategic Air Command ===
In 1959 Strategic Air Command (SAC) established the 4138th Strategic Wing at Turner Air Force Base, Georgia as part of SAC's plan to disperse its Boeing B-52 Stratofortress heavy bombers over a larger number of bases, thus making it more difficult for the Soviet Union to knock out the entire fleet with a surprise first strike. In 1962, in order to perpetuate the lineage of inactive bombardment units with illustrious World War II records, SAC received authority from Headquarters USAF to discontinue its Major Command controlled strategic wings that were equipped with combat aircraft and to replace them with Air Force controlled units, which could carry on their lineage and history. (Note: MAJCON units could not carry a permanent history or lineage Ravenstein, Guide to U<S, Air Force Lineage, p. 12.) In this reorganization, the 824th was activated on 1 February 1963 to replace the 336th Bombardment Squadron, which was simultaneously inactivated and transferred its mission, personnel and B-52s to the 824th.

Half of the squadron's aircraft were maintained on fifteen-minute alert, fully fueled and ready for combat to reduce their vulnerability to a Soviet missile strike. The squadron trained for strategic bombardment operations to meet the operational commitments of SAC. On 13 January 1964, a squadron B-52D bomber was returning to Turner from Westover Air Force Base, Massachusetts. The plane was carrying two nuclear weapons. Near Cumberland, Maryland, the aircraft encountered severe turbulence and failed structurally. Only two crewmembers survived the crash.

In April 1966, the squadron became non-operational when its personnel and B-52Ds deployed to Andersen Air Force Base, Guam, where they replaced B-52Fs that SAC had been deploying to Andersen for the Vietnam War since the previous year. The squadron's planes had been modified under a program called Big Belly, which increased their bombload to 84 500lb bombs or 42 750lb bombs, from the 27 they could previously carry. The squadron's deployed elements returned to Turner on 30 September 1966, and the 824th was awarded an Air Force Outstanding Unit Award for the actions of its personnel while deployed with the 3d Air Division at Anderson.

In December 1965, Robert S. McNamara, Secretary of Defense, directed reductions of SAC’s bomber force. This program called for the retirement of all B-52Cs and several subsequent B-52 models. As a result, the squadron's return to Turner was brief. Turner was scheduled to close as a SAC base in the spring of 1967. The squadron inactivated on 25 January 1967.

== Lineage ==
- Constituted as the 824th Bombardment Squadron (Heavy) on 14 September 1943

Activated on 20 September 1943
Redesignated 824th Bombardment Squadron (Pathfinder) on 14 February 1944
Redesignated 824th Bombardment Squadron, Heavy on 11 November 1944
Inactivated on 25 July 1945

- Activated on 15 November 1962 (not organized)

Organized on 1 February 1963
Inactivated on 25 January 1967

=== Assignments ===
- 484th Bombardment Group, 20 September 1943 – 25 July 1945
- Strategic Air Command, 15 November 1962 (not organized)
- 484th Bombardment Wing, 1 February 1963 – 25 January 1967

=== Stations ===
- Harvard Army Air Field, Nebraska, 20 September 1943 – 2 March 1944
- Torretto Airfield, Italy, April 1944
- Casablanca-Anfa Airport, French Morocco, c. 25 May – 25 July 1945
- Turner Air Force Base, Georgia, 1 February 1963 – 25 January 1967

=== Aircraft ===
- Consolidated B-24 Liberator, 1943–1945
- Boeing B-52 Stratofortress, 1963–1967

=== Awards and campaigns ===
Award streamer	Award	Dates	Notes
	Distinguished Unit Citation	13 June 1944	Munich, Germany and Innsbruck, Austria 824th Bombardment Squadron
	Distinguished Unit Citation	22 August 1944	Vienna, Austria 824th Bombardment Squadron
	Air Force Outstanding Unit Award	1 April 1966-30 September 1966	824th Bombardment Squadron

Campaign Streamer	Campaign	Dates	Notes
	Air Offensive, Europe	April 1944–5 June 1944	824th Bombardment Squadron
	Central Europe	April 1944–21 May 1945	824th Bombardment Squadron
	Air Combat, EAME Theater	April 1944–11 May 1945	824th Bombardment Squadron
	Rome-Arno	April 1944–9 September 1944	824th Bombardment Squadron
	Normandy	6 June 1944 – 24 July 1944	824th Bombardment Squadron
	Northern France	25 July 1944 – 14 September 1944	824th Bombardment Squadron
	Southern France	15 August 1944 – 14 September 1944	824th Bombardment Squadron
	North Apennines	10 September 1944 – 4 April 1945	824th Bombardment Squadron
	Rhineland	15 September 1944 – 21 March 1945	824th Bombardment Squadron
	Po Valley	3 April 1945 – 8 May 1945	824th Bombardment Squadron

== See also ==
- List of B-52 Units of the United States Air Force
- 1964 Savage Mountain B-52 crash
- B-24 Liberator units of the United States Army Air Forces
