= Jack J. Catton =

United States Air Force general

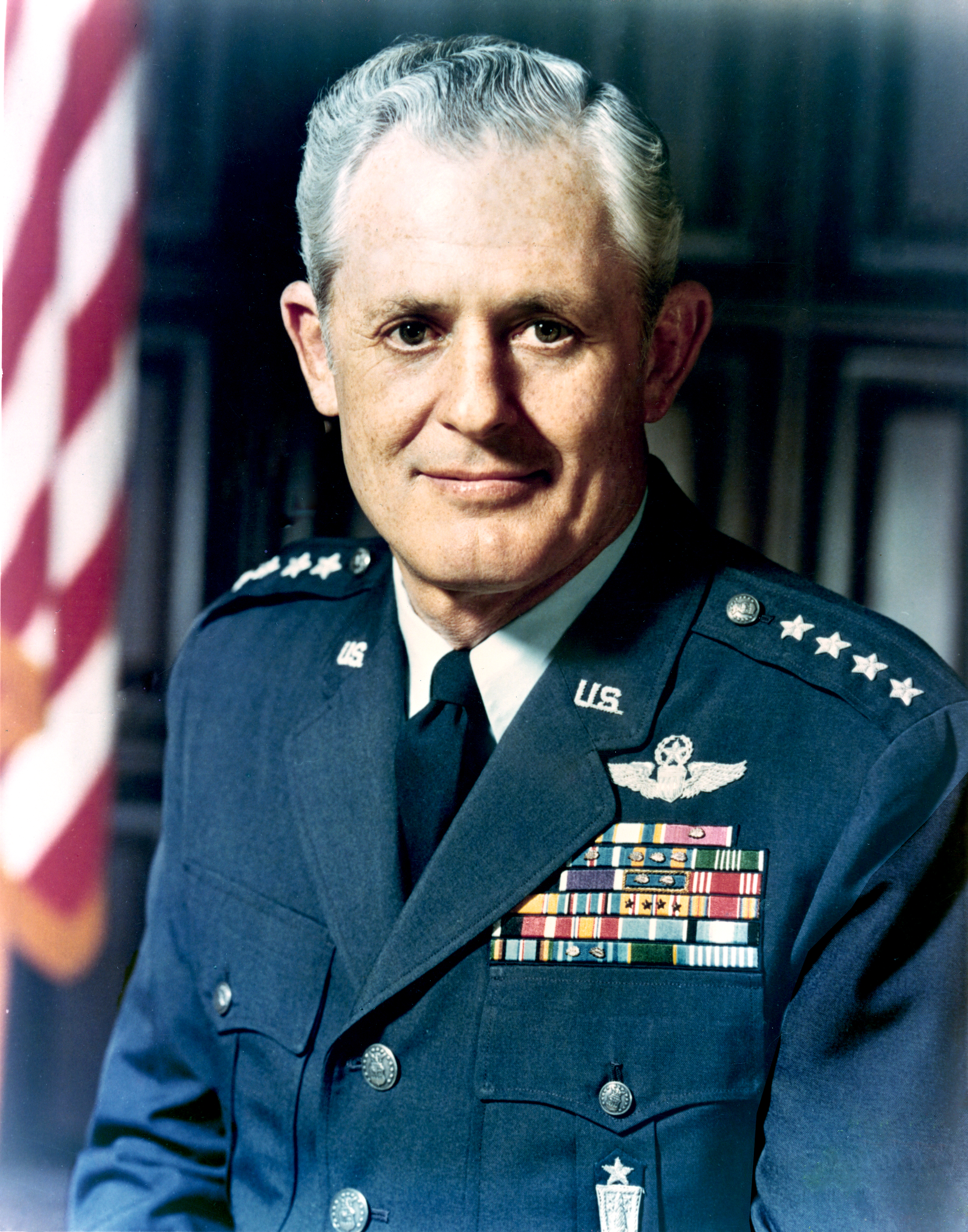
- General Jack J. Catton
- Born: February 5, 1920; Berkeley, California
- Died: December 4, 1990 (aged 70) near Riverside, California
- Military career
- Allegiance: United States of America
- Branch: United States Air Force
- Service years: 1940–1974
- Rank: General
- Commands: Air Force Logistics Command; Military Airlift Command; Fifteenth Air Force
- Conflicts: World War II; Korean War
- Awards: Distinguished Service Medal (2); Legion of Merit (2); Distinguished Flying Cross (2); Air Medal (4); Purple Heart
- Other work: Vice President, Lockheed

General Jack Joseph Catton (February 5, 1920 – December 4, 1990) was a United States Air Force four-star general and was commander of the Air Force Logistics Command with headquarters at Wright-Patterson Air Force Base and of the Military Airlift Command.

== Biography ==
General Catton was born in Berkeley, California, in 1920. He attended Fairfax High School in Los Angeles, Santa Monica Junior College and Loyola University in Los Angeles, California.

He entered the Army Air Corps in 1940 as a flying cadet and received pilot training at Santa Maria, California, and Randolph and Kelly Fields in Texas. He was commissioned a second lieutenant in the Army Air Corps in February 1941.

Early in World War II, General Catton served as an instructor pilot at Barksdale Field, Louisiana, and Hendricks Field, Florida, and as a squadron commander at Lockbourne Field, Ohio. He flew the first B-29 bomber across the Pacific to the Mariana Islands in 1944. While serving with the XXI Bomber Command he was awarded the Air Medal with three oak leaf clusters and the Distinguished Flying Cross with oak leaf cluster for extraordinary achievement during combat missions against Japan.

In 1946 and 1947 General Catton took part in the first two atomic weapons tests in the Pacific. During this period, he also commanded the 65th Bombardment Squadron. In June 1948 he was assigned as chief of the Policy Branch, Directorate of Plans, at Strategic Air Command headquarters, Andrews Air Force Base, Maryland. He moved with the command to Offutt Air Force Base, Nebraska, as chief of the Requirements Branch, Directorate of Plans. After a successful bout with polio, he went to March Air Force Base, California, in 1950 and served as director of operations for the 22d Bombardment Wing and later for the 12th Air Division until November 1951.

After flying combat missions against North Korea out of Japan for 90 days, General Catton went to Fairchild Air Force Base, Washington, in February 1952 as deputy commander of the 92d Bombardment Wing. As commander, he later led the wing from Fairchild to Guam in the first test of B-36 aircraft capabilities in sustained oversea operations. He then went to Davis-Monthan Air Force Base, Arizona, to command the 43d Bombardment Wing for a year. In June 1956 he returned to SAC headquarters for a tour of duty in the Directorate of Operations.

In November 1958 General Catton was selected chief of staff for the Eighth Air Force, Westover Air Force Base, Massachusetts. When he assumed command of the 817th Air Division at Pease Air Force Base, New Hampshire, in July 1959, he was the youngest brigadier general in the Air Force. Two years later he took command of the 822d Air Division, Turner Air Force Base, Georgia, where he served one year prior to becoming commander of the 823d Air Division at Homestead Air Force Base, Florida. In August 1963 he was named commander of the 821st Strategic Aerospace Division at Ellsworth Air Force Base, South Dakota.

In February 1964 he was assigned to Headquarters U.S. Air Force as director of operational requirements, deputy chief of staff for programs and requirements (later reorganized as Operational Requirements and Development Plans, Deputy Chief of Staff for Research and Development). During this period, he served as the Department of Defense representative and chairman of the National Committee for Clear Air Turbulence. In July 1966 he was transferred to the Office of the Assistant Deputy Chief of Staff for Programs and Resources as the director of Aerospace Programs, with additional duties as chairman of the Air Staff Board. In August 1967 he became deputy chief of staff for programs and resources.

Catton took command of Fifteenth Air Force at March Air Force Base, California, in August 1968, and of the Military Airlift Command at Scott Air Force Base, Illinois the following August. In September 1972 he became the commander of the Air Force Logistics Command with headquarters at Wright-Patterson Air Force Base, Ohio.

He was a command pilot and qualified in the C-5 Galaxy, C-141 Starlifter, C-9 Nightingale, all bombers from the B-17 Flying Fortress through the B-52 Stratofortress, KC-97 Stratofreighter and KC-135 Stratotanker, the F-4 Phantom II fighter bomber and the HH-53 helicopter. In addition he had limited experience in many of the century series fighters, and logged nearly 14,000 flying hours.

== Awards and decorations ==
His military decorations include the Air Force Distinguished Service Medal with oak leaf cluster, Legion of Merit with oak leaf cluster, Distinguished Flying Cross with oak leaf cluster, Purple Heart, Air Medal with three oak leaf clusters, and the Army Commendation Medal. He retired from the Air Force on August 1, 1974, and in retirement worked for Lockheed Corporation as a senior vice president, until 1984. Catton died on December 4, 1990. His son, Jack Catton, Jr., is also a U.S. Air Force general.

- Air Force Distinguished Service Medal with oak leaf cluster
- Legion of Merit with oak leaf cluster
- Distinguished Flying Cross with oak leaf cluster
- Purple Heart
- Air Medal with three oak leaf clusters
- Army Commendation Medal

== Effective dates of promotion ==
Insignia	Rank	Date
	General	August 1, 1969
	Lieutenant general	August 1, 1967
	Major general	May 16, 1963
	Brigadier general	August 1, 1959
	Colonel	January 19, 1951
	Lieutenant colonel	May 28, 1945
	Major	August 19, 1943
	Captain	February 26, 1942
	First lieutenant	February 1, 1942
	Second lieutenant	February 5, 1941
