= Bombardment group =

Unit of organizational command and control group

A bombardment group or bomb group was a unit of organizational command and control group of the United States Army Air Forces (USAAF) during World War II. A bombardment group was normally commanded by a colonel. The table of allowances (TOA) for personnel, aircraft and equipment grew steadily over the course of the war doubling from 35 aircraft in 1941 to 72 in February, 1945. The aircrew end strength reached upwards to two crews per aircraft.

== Categories ==
U.S. bomb groups were numbered and classified into four types: Very Heavy (VH), Heavy (H), Medium (M), and Light (L). Groups which combined bombers of differing categories into a single administrative organization were designated "Composite" groups. Bomber aircraft were assigned to groups by category:

- Very Heavy: Boeing B-29 Superfortress, Consolidated B-32 Dominator
- Heavy: Boeing B-17 Flying Fortress, Consolidated B-24 Liberator
- Medium: North American B-25 Mitchell, Martin B-26 Marauder
- Light: Douglas A-20 Havoc, Douglas A-26 Invader

(The USAAF also operated two fighter-bombers during the period, the Douglas A-24 Banshee and the North American A-36 Mustang. Groups with these two types were first classified as Light Bombers, then Dive Bombers, before being re-classified as Fighters.)

== Tables of organization and equipment ==
=== Unit organization ===
The tables of organization and equipment (TO&E) for all bombardment groups were roughly the same. In 1942, existing bomb groups were expanded from three to four numbered bombardment squadrons; and most bomb groups created during the war retained this structure - B-29 groups were the exception, having only three squadrons. In addition to the flying squadrons issued Aircrew Badges, each group contained a group headquarters, a service squadron, and detachments for support of aircraft, equipment, and personnel from quartermaster, aviation ordnance, military police, chemical, signal, and maintenance companies, and from a weather squadron. These support personnel were then pooled and re-distributed among an unofficial service group and detailed for various duties as needed.

The service group provided support and technical sections for the group requirements as a whole: Flying control, Ordnance, airfield security, firefighting, Post Exchange (PX), Special Services, Mail, Transportation ("motor pool"), Communications, Radar, Gunnery instruction, Personal Equipment, and Weather (Meteorology). The service group also had its own mess section. The service group had approximately 30 officers and 300 to 400 enlisted men.

The group headquarters contained sections organized in the traditional U.S. Army structure: Personnel (S-1), Intelligence (S-2), Operations (S-3), and Supply (S-4). Including inspectors, headquarters organizations in practice totalled approximately 20 officers, some of whom were also pilots, and 60 to 80 enlisted men.

Each bomb squadron, in addition to its assigned flight crews, had a squadron headquarters structured similarly to the group's, and six technical support and maintenance sections supporting its aircraft, equipment, and personnel: Mess, Armament, Ordnance, Communications, Medical, and Engineering (aircraft maintenance). The ground support members of a bomb squadron numbered 15-20 officers and 250 to 300 enlisted men.

Functionally, bomb groups were divided into an air echelon (the collective aircrews), and a ground echelon (all supporting ground personnel within the group, including those in attached Sub Depots). Groups commonly had two deputy commanders, termed the air executive officer and the ground executive officer, to coordinate these echelons.

=== Personnel strengths ===
In 1943, a heavy bomb group had a total complement of 294 officers and 1,487 enlisted men to fly and support 48 heavy bombers; and a medium bomb group had 294 officers and 1,297 enlisted men for 64 medium bombers.

By February 1945, the size of the 125 standardized bomb group establishments had grown to:

AAF Bombardment group organization
March 1945

Type of unit	Type of aircraft	Number of aircraft	Number of crews	Men per crew	Total personnel	Officers	Enlisted
Very heavy bombardment group	B-29	45	60	11	2,278	462	1,816
Heavy bombardment group	B-17, B-24	72	96	9 - 11	2,261	465	1,796
Medium bombardment group	B-25, B-26	96	96	5 - 6	1,759	393	1,386
Light bombardment group	A-20, A-26	96	96	3 - 4	1,304	211	1,093

The Army Air Forces also employed two composite groups with their own TO&Es: the 28th Bomb Group (15 B-24 and 30 B-25), and the 509th Composite Group (15 B-29 and 5 C-54). 19 heavy groups and one light bomb group were to be converted to very heavy groups for duty against Japan, but the war ended before the plan was carried out.
