= Army Air Forces Antisubmarine Command =

Army Air Forces Antisubmarine Command (later I Bomber Command)
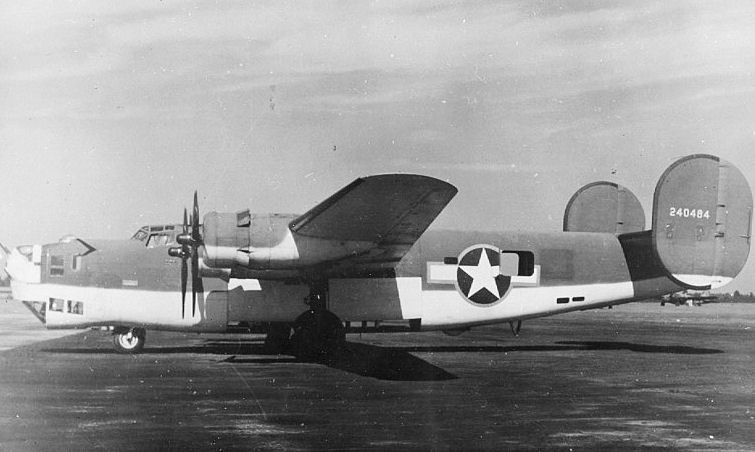
- B-24 Liberator of AAF Antisubmarine Command (Note: Aircraft is Consolidated B-24D-65-CO Liberator, serial 42-40483. This plane was salvaged on 10 October 1945. Baugher, Joe (28 December 2022). "1942 USAF Serial Numbers". Joe Baugher. The retracted antenna for the SCR-517 radar is visible just aft of the open bomb bay doors in the place where the ventral gun turret would normally be installed.)
- Active: 1942–1946
- Disbanded: 8 October 1948
- Country: United States
- Branch: Army Air Forces
- Type: Command
- Role: Antisubmarine warfare, then bomber training
- Part of: First Air Force
- Engagements: American Theater of World War II; European Theater

Insignia
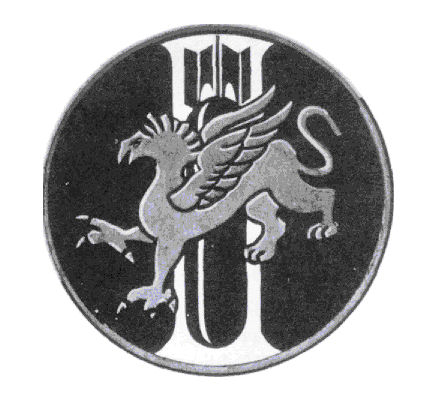
- Shoulder Sleeve Insigne (Note: Approved 8 January 1946. Description: On a disc azure, border or, a pile argent charged with a large, red aerial bomb palewise, all surmounted by a griffin or, facing toward dexter, fimbriated azure.)

The Army Air Forces Antisubmarine Command was formed in the fall of 1942 to establish a single command to control antisubmarine warfare (ASW) activities of the Army Air Forces (AAF). It was formed from the resources of I Bomber Command, which had been carrying out the antisubmarine mission in the Atlantic and Caribbean since the Attack on Pearl Harbor due to the lack of long range Naval aviation in that area.

The command's units conducted ASW along the Atlantic and Gulf coasts of the United States, in the Caribbean Sea and in Europe, where it used bases in England and French Morocco. Its operations were marked by disagreements between the AAF and the Navy concerning the conduct of air ASW. In the fall of 1943, the ASW mission was transferred to the Navy and the command became a bomber training unit until it was inactivated in 1946.

== History ==
=== Initial Army Air Forces involvement in antisubmarine warfare ===
Within a day after the declaration of war by the United States the Army Air Forces (AAF) began patrols of both the East and West coasts. Defense plans drawn up before the war began assigned the Navy responsibility for operations beyond the coastline, with Army aircraft serving in a supporting role. Because naval aviation that could perform long range patrols was nearly non-existent along the Atlantic coast in early 1942, the burden for aerial antisubmarine patrols fell on the AAF, which had available aircraft, but whose crews had not been trained for the mission.

German Navy submarines began operating in American coastal waters. By March 1942 fifty-three ships had been sunk in the North Atlantic Naval Coastal Frontier. As a result, the Commander of the North Atlantic Naval Coastal Frontier requested the Army's Eastern Defense Command to undertake offshore patrols with all available aircraft. The first patrols were performed by elements of I Bomber Command, (Note: Despite the identical name of this command in 1942, it was a different unit. Once AAF Antisubmarine Command assumed its ASW mission, I Bomber Command was inactivated. The I Bomber Command was reactivated in late 1943 and trained radar crews for combat. It was later renamed XX Bomber Command, but is also unrelated to command of that name training bomber units under Second Air Force as XX Bomber Command. Maurer, Combat Units, p. 452) which would be the primary AAF command involved in antisubmarine warfare (ASW) in early 1942, with assistance from I Air Support Command. However, although I Bomber Command was primarily involved in conducting ASW, it was doing so on an emergency basis, and was subject to withdrawal from these duties to perform its primary bombardment function. It soon became apparent that if the AAF were to continue with the ASW mission, its units would have to be organized under a specially trained and equipped command.

=== AAF Antisubmarine Command organizes ===
In May 1942, General Arnold, Commanding General of the AAF, proposed to Admiral King, the Chief of Naval Operations, that the AAF establish a "coastal command", similar to RAF Coastal Command, operating "when necessary, under the proper Naval authority." That same month saw both a new high in sinkings by U-boats and a shift in their attacks from the Atlantic coast to the Caribbean Sea. In response, the AAF established the Gulf Task Force, with elements of Third Air Force augmenting I Bomber Command, at Miami, Florida (Note: The task force was briefly located at Charleston, South Carolina. Ferguson, p. 18.) to augment the Gulf Sea Frontier. The command situation had only worsened, with two air forces, two navy sea frontiers, and two army defense commands, with differing areas of responsibility, all involved in aerial ASW with ad hoc command relations and separate administrative and operational command arrangements. Later in the month, the War Department requested General Arnold to reorganize I Bomber Command to fulfill the requirements of ASW air operations, either in support of, or in lieu of, naval forces to protect Allied shipping.

Disagreements between the Army and the Navy over command relationships delayed activation of the command until October 1942. The activation of the single Army Air Forces Antisubmarine Command at New York City to control all Army Air Forces units conducting antisubmarine warfare reflected the Army's desire for a single mobile force. The command drew its personnel and equipment from I Bomber Command, which was simultaneously inactivated. In November 1942, the command's units were organized into two wings, reflecting the Navy desire that forces in a sea frontier be unified under a single command. The 25th Antisubmarine Wing, Located in New York City, was responsible for patrols off the Atlantic Coast, while the 26th Antisubmarine Wing in Miami, Florida conducted operations in the Caribbean and the Gulf of Mexico.

=== Overseas operations ===
By late 1942, German strategy had shifted to one of defending against planned Allied offensives in Europe and North Africa by striking at their lines of communication, rather than striking merchant shipping wherever it was most vulnerable. As a result, the Kriegsmarine concentrated its U-boats in the northern and eastern Atlantic. To meet this challenge, the command moved two squadrons to England in November, where they operated with RAF Coastal Command. The two units were attached to the 1st Antisubmarine Group (Provisional), which became the 2037th Antisubmarine Wing (Provisional). The decision to deploy the squadrons was made quickly and preparations for their reception and the maintenance of their aircraft were almost nonexistent. Lack of hangar space at RAF St Eval forced them to perform major maintenance outside during the winter.

A deployed squadron was responsible for the first confirmed sinking of an enemy sub by one of the command's aircraft. Although they did not initially sink a large number of U-boats, their harassing tactics required German subs to adopt evasive tactics and reduced the number and effectiveness of attacks on convoys crossing the Atlantic. In February 1943, The squadrons participated in Operation Gondola, whose goal was to attack every U-boat traversing the Bay of Biscay at least once.

The Navy believed that more antisubmarine forces were required to protect convoys in the North Atlantic, where attacks were becoming more concentrated. In March, the 19th Antisubmarine Squadron relocated to Gander Airport in Newfoundland, soon joined by two other squadrons.

Eventually the command formed two groups in England and Morocco. In June 1943, the 480th Antisubmarine Group was formed at Craw Field, French Morocco to conduct patrols north and west of Morocco along the Atlantic approaches to the Strait of Gibraltar. The group was formed with the 1st and 2d Antisubmarine Squadrons, which had moved to Morocco from England. In July 1943, German submarines concentrated off the coast of Portugal to intercept convoys bound for the Mediterranean Sea. The group damaged and sank several subs, protecting supply lines for Operation Husky, the invasion of Sicily. Portions of the 480th deployed to Sicily to provide coverage for Operation Avalanche, the landings on mainland Italy. In November 1943, the 480th Group returned to the United States. In January 1944, it moved to Clovis Army Air Field, and was reassigned to form cadres for heavy bombardment units being activated by Second Air Force.

Following the activation of the 480th Group, the 479th Antisubmarine Group was formed at RAF St Eval. Squadrons from Newfoundland had moved to England to replace those moved to Morocco. The group conducted patrols over the Bay of Biscay, achieving its greatest success in the first two months it was active. Following this period, German U-boats adopted tactics that kept them submerged in the group's area of operations during daylight hours. The group continued its patrols, occasionally engaging Luftwaffe aircraft until October. It was disbanded in England in November.

Despite the deployment of command units to Newfoundland, England and Morocco, the majority of the command remained in the United States conducting patrols and covering convoys in an area where the threat of submarine attack had substantially diminished. The Navy insisted that forces be retained in this area because of the ability of the German submarine force to rapidly shift its forces. The command's wings were assisted by Navy units and the Civil Air Patrol, but flew the only long range aircraft. Activity in this region was at such a low level that for three months, from December 1942 to February 1943, not a single enemy U-boat was sighted. An exception was in the waters near Trinidad, where German subs were attacking merchant shipping. From December 1942, air echelons from various squadrons deployed to Trinidad, where they joined elements of the 25th Bombardment Group, a Sixth Air Force unit, that was also engaged in antisubmarine patrols. Finally, the 23d Antisubmarine Squadron deployed to Edinburgh Field, Trinidad to defend against this threat and to experiment with its 75mm cannon armed North American B-25 Mitchells.

=== Transfer of mission to the Navy ===
Disagreements between the AAF and the Navy over command of long range aviation units engaged in antisubmarine warfare and of whether those forces would best be employed (offensively or defensively) continued into 1943, and in June, the AAF agreed that "The Army is prepared to withdraw Army Air Forces from anti-submarine operations at such time as the Navy is ready to take over those duties completely." In July, plans were made for 77 of the command's Consolidated B-24 Liberators equipped for antisubmarine warfare to be exchanged for an equal number of B-24s assigned to the Navy. Navy squadrons relieved the 479th Group in October, and its personnel and planes were transferred to Eighth Air Force to form a pathfinder unit. By mid November, the 480th Group had been relieved and was on its way back to the US. Its two squadrons were inactivated in October and their personnel assigned elsewhere. The majority of the command's squadrons were redesignated as bombardment squadrons and transferred to Second Air Force, while the 25th and 26th Wings were disbanded.

=== Bomber training ===
In August 1943, the command was redesignated I Bomber Command and reassigned to First Air Force. It continued to oversee antisubmarine units in the United States through October 1943 and overseas through December. It began to train bomber crews in early 1944, when Replacement Training Units (Note: Replacement Training Units were oversized units to train individual pilots or aircrews. Craven & Cate, Introduction, p. xxxvi.) were reassigned to the command from Second Air Force (heavy bombers) and Third Air Force (medium and light bombers). However, the AAF was finding that standard military units, based on relatively inflexible tables of organization, were not well adapted to the training mission. Accordingly, in April 1944, a more functional system was adopted in which each base was organized into a separate numbered Army Air Force Base Unit, that could be adjusted to the proper size for that base's mission. Using this organization, it continued to train bomber organizations and personnel (at a reduced level after the end of the war) until inactivated in March 1946.

The command remained inactive until it was disbanded on 8 October 1948.

== Lineage ==
- Constituted as the Army Air Forces Antisubmarine Command on 13 October 1942

Activated on 15 October 1942

- Redesignated I Bomber Command on 26 August 1943

Inactivated on 21 March 1946

- Disbanded on 8 October 1948

=== Assignments ===
- Army Air Forces, 15 October 1942
- First Air Force, August 1943 – 21 March 1946

=== Components ===
Wings

- 1st Antisubmarine Wing (Provisional) (later 2037th Antisubmarine Wing (Provisional)): c. December 1942 – c. 21 June 1943 (Note: Components stationed with command headquarters, except as noted.)

RAF St Eval, England then Craw Field, French Morocco

- 25th Antisubmarine Wing: 20 November 1942 – 15 October 1943
- 26th Antisubmarine Wing: 20 November 1942 – 15 October 1943

Miami, Florida

Groups

- 1st Antisubmarine Group (Provisional): c. 1 January 1943 – c. 1 March 1943
- 1st Sea-Search Attack Group: (later 1st Sea-Search Attack Unit): attached for operations 15 October 1942 – 10 November 1943

Langley Field, Virginia

- 13th Bombardment Group: 15 October 1942 – 20 November 1942

Westover Field, Massachusetts

- 45th Bombardment Group: 15 October 1942 – 20 November 1942

Miami Army Air Field, Florida

- 47th Bombardment Group, 11 July 1945 – 7 February 1946

Seymour Johnson Field, North Carolina, 14 July 1945 – c. 9 September 1945, Lake Charles Army Air Field, Louisiana

- 302d Bombardment Group: 17 December 1943 – 10 April 1944

Chatham Army Air Field, Georgia

- 304th Bombardment Group: 29 October 1942 – 20 November 1942

Langley Field, Virginia

- 377th Bombardment Group: 18 October 1942 – 20 November 1942

Fort Dix Army Air Field, New Jersey

- 378th Bombardment Group, 18 October 1942 – 20 November 1942

Langley Field, Virginia

- 400th Bombardment Group, 15 December 1943 – 10 April 1944

Charleston Army Air Base, South Carolina

- 455th Bombardment Group, 4 October 1943 – c. 14 January 1944

Langley Field, Virginia until 13 December 1943

- 460th Bombardment Group, c. 29 October 1943 – c. 5 February 1944

Chatham Army Air Field until 4 January 1944

- 471st Bombardment Group, 21 January 1944 – 10 April 1944

Westover Field, Massachusetts

- 477th Bombardment Group, 15 January 1944 – 10 April 1944

Selfridge Field, Michigan

- 479th Antisubmarine Group, 8 July 1943 – 11 November 1943 (attached to No. 19 Group, RAF Coastal Command for operations, VIII Bomber Command for administration)

RAF St Eval, England −6 August 1943, RAF Dunkeswell, England −1 November 1943, RAF Podington, England

- 480th Antisubmarine Group, 21 June 1943 – c. 1 January 1944 (attached to Northwest African Coastal Air Force, 21 June – 25 July 1943, Northwest African Air Service Command, 26 July – 22 August 1943, XII Fighter Command, 23 August – November 1943). Under the operational control of US Navy Fleet Air Wing 15, 21 June 1943 – unknown)

Craw Field, French Morocco – November 1943, Langley Field, Virginia

Squadrons

- 4th Antisubmarine Squadron, 8 June – 8 July 1943

Gander Airport, Newfoundland – 23 June 1943; RAF St Eval 30 June 1943

- 6th Antisubmarine Squadron, 8 June – 14 August 1943

Gander Airport, Newfoundland

- 19th Antisubmarine Squadron, 8 June – 8 July 1943

Gander Airport, Newfoundland – c. 23 June 1943; RAF St Eval c. 30 June 1943

- 20th Antisubmarine Squadron, 8 February – 13 October 1943

Torbay Airport, Newfoundland

- 21st Antisubmarine Squadron, attached 15 October 1942; assigned 8 March 1943 – 28 September 1943

New Orleans Army Air Base, Louisiana – 2 May 1943; Gulfport Army Air Field, Mississippi

- 22d Antisubmarine Squadron, 3–8 March 1943

Cherry Point Marine Corps Air Station, North Carolina

- 23d Antisubmarine Squadron, air echelon attached 13 October – 20 November 1942; assigned 15 October 1943 – 6 February 1944

Air echelon at Drew Field, Florida, 13 October – 20 November 1942; Zandery Field, Surinam, 15 October 1943, Drew Field, Florida, 24 December 1943, Clovis Army Air Field, 6 February 1944. Ground echelon at Drew Field, Florida, 15 October 1943, Smoky Hill Army Air Field, Kansas, 6 November 1943 (disbanded)

- 124th Observation Squadron, 15 October – 20 November 1942

New Orleans Army Air Base, Louisiana

- 522d Bombardment Squadron, 18 October – 20 November 1942

Lantana, Florida

- 821st Bombardment Squadron, 1 February 1944 – 10 April 1944

Selfridge Field, Michigan

Base Units

- 101st AAF Base Unit, c. 10 April 1944 – c. 21 March 1946
- 103d AAF Base Unit, 1 February 1945 – c. 31 October 1945
- 112th AAF Base Unit, 10 April 1944 – c. 10 September 1945, 1 February 1946 – 21 March 1946

Westover Field, Massachusetts

- 113th AAF Base Unit, 10 April 1944 – 31 May 1945

Charleston Army Air Base, South Carolina

- 114th AAF Base Unit, 10 April 1944 – c. 21 March 1946

Chatham Army Air Field, Georgia

- 115th AAF Base Unit, 10 April 1944 – 10 April 1945

Selfridge Field, Michigan – May 1944, Godman Field, Kentucky – April 1945, Freeman Field, Indiana

- 117th AAF Base Unit, 13 June 1944 – c. 15 August 1944

Sturgis Army Air Field, Kentucky

- 118th AAF Base Unit, 21 August 1944 – c. 15 March 1945

Godman Field, Kentucky – August 1944, Freeman Field, Indiana

=== Stations ===
- New York, New York, 15 October 1942
- Mitchel Field, New York, c. 1 October 1943 – 21 March 1946

=== Campaigns ===
Campaign Streamer	Campaign	Dates	Notes
	Antisubmarine, American Theater	15 October 1942 – 15 October 1943	
	Antisubmarine, EAME Theater	November 1942–1 December 1943	

== See also ==
- B-17 Flying Fortress units of the United States Army Air Forces
- B-24 Liberator units of the United States Army Air Forces
