= 19th Military Airlift Squadron =

19th Military Airlift Squadron Later 19th Aeromedical Airlift Squadron
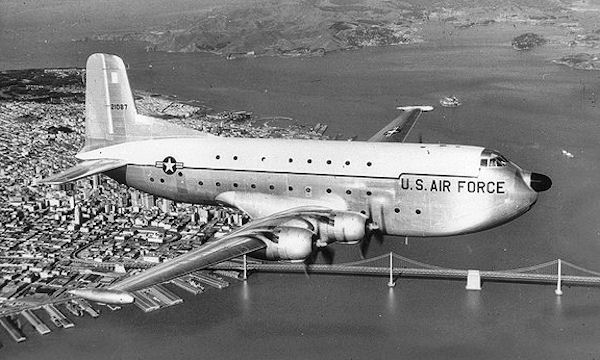
- C-124 Globemaster II
- Active: 1942–1943; 1952–1969
- Country: United States
- Branch: United States Air Force
- Role: Airlift
- Engagements: European Theater of Operations
- Decorations: Air Force Outstanding Unit Award; Republic of Vietnam Gallantry Cross with Palm

Insignia
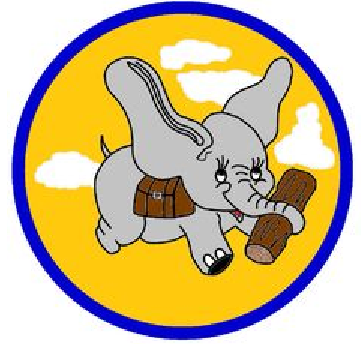
- 19th Logistic Support Squadron emblem (Note: Approved 26 January 1956.)

The 19th Military Airlift Squadron is an inactive United States Air Force unit. It was last assigned to the 62d Military Airlift Wing at Kelly Air Force Base, Texas, where it was inactivated on 22 December 1969. The squadron was activated in 1952 as the 19th Logistics Support Squadron and served to transport special weapons.

In 1985, the squadron was consolidated with the 19th Antisubmarine Squadron, which served during the Battle of the Atlantic from bases in the United States, Newfoundand, and England before disbanding and transferring its aircraft and personnel to form pathfinder units. The consolidated squadron was designated the 19th Aeromedical Airlift Squadron, but has not been active since consolidation.

== History ==
=== World War II ===
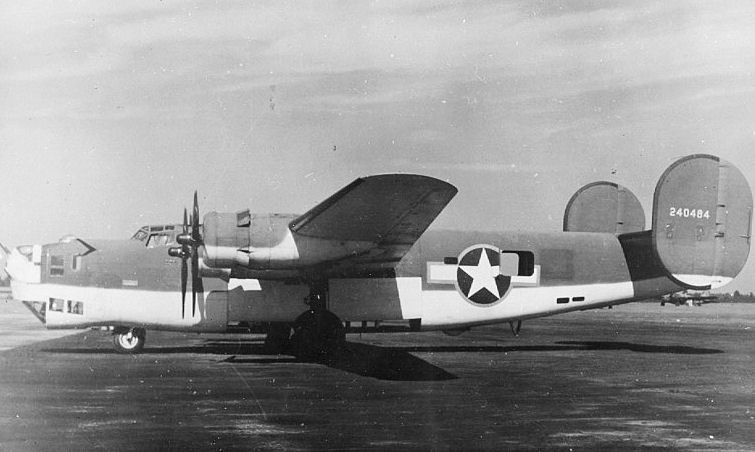
B-24 modified for antisubmarine warfare

The first predecessor of the squadron was activated at Salt Lake City Army Air Base, Utah in July 1942 as the 363d Bombardment Squadron, one of the four original squadrons of the 304th Bombardment Group. In September, the squadron moved to Geiger Field, Washington, where it received its first personnel and began training with Boeing B-17 Flying Fortresses, but soon moved to Langley Field, Virginia and switched to the Consolidated B-24 Liberator.

After its arrival on the eastern seaboard, the squadron began antisubmarine warfare patrols. In November, it was renamed the 19th Antisubmarine Squadron and in December, its parent 304th Bombardment Group, whose squadrons had dispersed to various locations, was inactivated and the squadron was assigned to the 25th Antisubmarine Wing, which supervised Army Air Forces throughout the Atlantic coast. The Navy believed that more antisubmarine forces were required to protect convoys in the North Atlantic, where attacks were becoming more concentrated. In March, the 19th Antisubmarine Squadron relocated to Gander Airport, Newfoundland, soon joined by two other squadrons.

Army Air Forces Antisubmarine Command had moved some of its North American based antisubmarine squadrons to England in December 1942, but those squadrons had subsequently been moved to airfields in French Morocco, where they were assigned to the newly created 480th Antisubmarine Group under the control of Fleet Air Wing 15, part of the Moroccan Sea Frontier.

To replace them, the antisubmarine squadrons in Newfoundland, including the 19th, moved to RAF St Eval in Cornwall in March 1943, where they formed the 479th Antisubmarine Group under the operational control of RAF Coastal Command. The group conducted patrols over the Bay of Biscay in coordination with Coastal Command, achieving its greatest success in the first two months it was in action. Following this period, German U-boats adopted tactics that kept them submerged in the group's area of operations during daylight hours. The 479th Group continued its patrols, occasionally engaging Luftwaffe aircraft until October. The 479th Group was disbanded in England in November, along with the 19th Squadron. The squadron's personnel and aircraft were transferred to Eighth Air Force, where they formed the cadre for new special operations and pathfinder units.

=== Special weapons airlift ===
The second predecessor of the unit was established at Kelly Air Force Base, Texas as the 19th Logistic Support Squadron in September 1952 as the first of three logistic support squadrons (Note: The other two squadrons were the 28th Logistic Support Squadron, activated at Hill Air Force Base in 1953, and the 7th Logistic Support Squadron, activated at Robins Air Force Base in 1954. The squadrons were familiarly known as the "7th, 19th and 28th Logs" and each incorporated a log into its squadron emblem.) organized by Air Materiel Command (AMC) and equipped with Douglas C-124 Globemaster IIs. Its mission was to provide worldwide airlift of nuclear weapons and related equipment, with a secondary mission to airlift other Department of Defense cargo as required when space was available. Until February 1955, when AMC united its logistic support squadrons under the 3079th Aviation Depot Wing, the squadron was assigned to the San Antonio Air Materiel Area.

In July 1963, Military Air Transport Service (MATS) assumed the mission of transporting special weapons from AMC and assigned the squadron to the 62d Troop Carrier Wing, at McChord Air Force Base, Washington one of MATS's two C-124 troop carrier wings. In 1964, it was redesignated the 19th Air Transport Squadron. Shortly before its inactivation, its mission changed to that of strategic transport squadron flying worldwide airlift operations. Beginning in 1966, the 62d Wing began replacing its C-124s with Lockheed C-141 Starlifters. The squadron was inactivated in 1969 with the retirement of the C-124 from regular service.

In 1985 the two squadrons were consolidated and redesignated as the 19th Aeromedical Airlift Squadron.

== Lineage ==
19th Antisubmarine Squadron

- Constituted as the 363d Bombardment Squadron (Heavy) on 28 January 1942

Activated on 15 July 1942
Redesignated 19th Antisubmarine Squadron (Heavy) on 29 November 1942
Disbanded on 11 November 1943

- Reconstituted on 19 September 1985 and consolidated with the 19th Military Airlift Squadron as the 19th Aeromedical Airlift Squadron

19th Military Airlift Squadron

- Constituted as the 19th Logistic Support Squadron on 1 September 1952

Activated on 23 September 1952
Redesignated 19th Air Transport Squadron, Special on 8 July 1964
Redesignated 19th Military Airlift Squadron, Special on 8 January 1966
Redesignated 19th Military Airlift Squadron on 8 April 1969
Inactivated on 22 December 1969

- Consolidated with the 19th Antisubmarine Squadron as the 19th Aeromedical Airlift Squadron on 19 September 1985

=== Assignments ===
- 304th Bombardment Group, 15 July 1942
- 25th Antisubmarine Wing, 30 December 1942
- Army Air Forces Antisubmarine Command, 8 June 1943
- 479th Antisubmarine Group, 8 July – 11 November 1943
- San Antonio Air Materiel Area, 23 September 1952
- 3079th Aviation Depot Wing, 6 February 1955
- 39th Logistic Support Group, 1 July 1962
- 62d Troop Carrier Wing (later 62d Air Transport Wing, 62d Military Airlift Wing), 1 July 1963 – 22 December 1969

=== Stations ===
- Salt Lake City Army Air Base, Utah, 15 July 1942
- Geiger Field, Washington, 15 September 1942
- Ephrata Army Air Field, Washington, 1 October 1942
- Langley Field, Virginia, 29 October 1942 – 19 March 1943
- Gander Airport, Newfoundland, 19 March – c. 25 June 1943
- RAF St Eval (Station 129), England, c. 30 June 1943
- RAF Dunkeswell (Station 173), England, 6 August 1943
- RAF Podington, England (Station 109), 11 November 1943
- Kelly Air Force Base, Texas, 23 September 1952 – 22 December 1969

=== Aircraft ===
- Boeing B-17 Flying Fortress, 1942
- Consolidated B-24 Liberator, 1942–1944
- Douglas C-124 Globemaster II 1952–1969

=== Awards and campaigns ===
Award streamer	Award	Dates	Notes
	Air Force Outstanding Unit Award	17–28 October 1962	19th Logistic Support Squadron
	Air Force Outstanding Unit Award	1 January 1968–22 December 1969	19th Military Airlift Squadron
	Vietnamese Gallantry Cross with Palm	1 April 1968–22 December 1969	19th Miitary Airlift Squadron

Campaign Streamer	Campaign	Dates	Notes
	Antisubmarine	15 July 1942–c. 24 June 1943	19th Antisubmarine Squadron
	Air Offensive, Europe	c. 30 June 1943–11 November 1943	19th Antisubmarine Squadron

== See also ==
- List of United States Air Force airlift squadrons
- B-17 Flying Fortress units of the United States Army Air Forces
- B-24 Liberator units of the United States Army Air Forces
