= RAF Podington =

Former Royal Air Force station

RAF Podington USAAF Station 109
- Podington, Bedfordshire in England
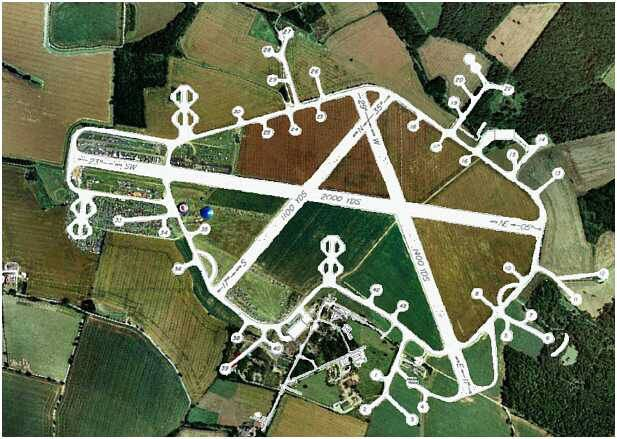
- Podington airfield overlay

Site information
- Type: Royal Air Force station
- Owner: Air Ministry
- Operator: Royal Air Force; United States Army Air Forces

Location
- Location in Bedfordshire RAF Podington (the United Kingdom)
- Coordinates: 52°13′52″N 00°36′21″W
- Grid reference: SP 953603

Site history
- Built: August 1942; 84 years ago
- In use: 7 January 1946; 80 years ago
- Fate: closed, returned to industry and recreation

Airfield information
- Elevation: 330 feet (101 m) AMSL
Runways
Direction	Length and surface
05/23	6,000 feet (1,829 m) concrete
00/00	3,300 feet (1,006 m) concrete
00/00	3,300 feet (1,006 m) concrete

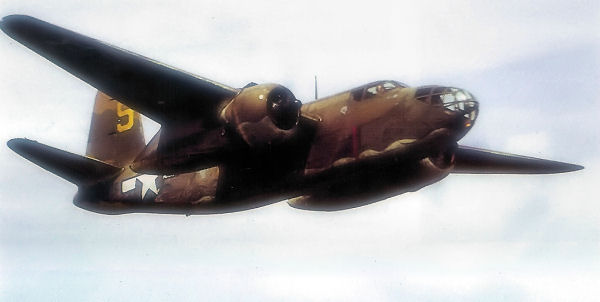
RDB-7B (RAF Douglas A-20C-1-DO Havoc Boston III), registration AL672, shown as a staff communications aircraft for 8th AF HQ at RAF Bovingdon. Prior to its use by 8th AF, this aircraft was originally used to equip the 15th Bombardment Squadron (Light) and used on 4 July 1942 a low-level attack on Luftwaffe airfields in the Netherlands.

Royal Air Force Podington, more commonly known as RAF Podington, is a former Royal Air Force station in northern Bedfordshire, England, 6 miles (10 kilometres) south-east of Wellingborough, Northamptonshire. Following closure of the station in 1961, the site has been used by Santa Pod Raceway.

== History ==
Podington airfield was originally built as an aerodrome for the Air Ministry between 1940 and 1941, to accommodate two bomber aircraft squadrons of the Royal Air Force.

=== USAAF use ===
On 18 April 1942, it was made available to the United States Army Air Forces (USAAF) Eighth Air Force (8th AF). Podington was assigned USAAF Station Number 109.

==== 28th Troop Carrier Squadron ====
The first USAAF unit to use Podington was the 28th Troop Carrier Squadron (28th TCS) in June 1942, arriving from Westover Army Air Field, Massachusetts. The 20th was part of the 60th Troop Carrier Group, based at RAF Chelveston.

The 28th TCS flew Douglas C-47 Skytrains from the base until rejoining the 60th at RAF Aldermaston in August.

==== 15th Bombardment Squadron (Light) ====
The 15th Bombardment Squadron (15th BS), arrived on 15 September 1942 from RAF Molesworth, flying the British Boston III light bomber. The 15th was originally part of the 27th Bombardment Group (Light), based in the Philippine Islands, however the group's aircraft (A-24's), did not arrive by 7 December 1941. Due to the deteriorating situation in the Philippines after the Japanese attack, they were diverted to Australia where they reformed into a combat unit and fought in the Dutch East Indies and New Guinea campaigns.

From Molesworth, the squadron joined with six RAF crews from RAF Swanton Morley in Norfolk for a low-level attack on Luftwaffe airfields in the Netherlands on 4 July. At Podington, the 15th BS later acquired their own USAAF Douglas A-20 Havocs, and flew a number of missions with RAF Bomber Command. In October, the 15th BS was transferred to Twelfth Air Force for support of Allied landings in North Africa, being assigned to Ste-Barbe-du-Tlelat Airfield, Algeria on 26 December 1942, its crews were absorbed by the 47th Bombardment Group (Light), and the 15th was inactivated.

==== 8th Bomber Command Combat Crew Replacement Unit ====
The VII BC CCRU moved almost immediately to Podington in August 1942. The unit remained until May 1943, processing personnel into the UK, then assigning them as replacements to various 8th AF groups in East Anglia.

==== 301st Bombardment Group (Heavy) ====
From 15 August through to 2 September 1942, Podington was briefly used by the 301st Bombardment Group, based at RAF Chelveston as a satellite airfield for its Boeing B-17 Flying Fortress bombers.

It was quickly found that Podington was inadequate to support the B-17s, and required improvement to class A airfield standards. As a result, the runways at Podington were lengthened to accommodate the heavy four-engined bombers of the Eighth Air Force (8th AF). Topographical limitations, however, resulted in the NE-SW runway being only 1,100 yards (1,000 metres), giving Podington an exceptionally short secondary runway. Additional dispersed hardstands and taxiways were also constructed.

==== 100th Bombardment Group (Heavy) ====
In early June 1943, the 100th Bombardment Group, Heavy arrived at Podington from Kearney, Nebraska. However the group only stayed for less than a week (2–8 June) before moving on to RAF Thorpe Abbotts in south Norfolk, East Anglia.

==== 92nd Bombardment Group (Heavy) ====
Podington remained vacant until 23 September, when the 92nd Bombardment Group (Heavy) moved into Podington from RAF Alconbury in Cambridgeshire, to allow the 482nd Bomb Group to be formed there. The 92nd was the oldest group in the Eighth Air Force, having been the first USAAF bomber group to make the transatlantic flight to the UK in July 1942.

The 92nd Bomb Group was known as 'Fame's Favored Few', and it was assigned to the 40th Combat Wing, at RAF Thurleigh. The group tail code was a 'Triangle B'. Its operational squadrons were:

- 325th Bombardment Squadron (NV)
- 326th Bombardment Squadron (JW)
- 327th Bombardment Squadron (UX)
- 407th Bombardment Squadron (PY)

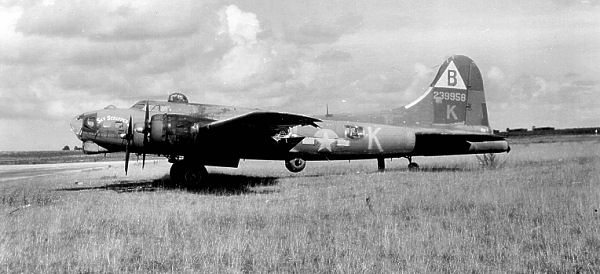
Lockheed/Vega B-17G-10-VE Flying Fortress (serial 42-39958) of the 92d Bomb Group. This aircraft suffered severe damage during a mission to Hamburg Germany on 4 November 1944 attacking the Harburg oil complex. It was written off after it landed safely.

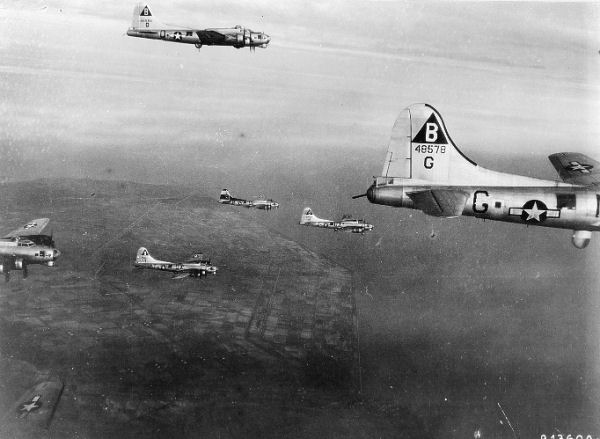
B-17s of the 92d Bomb Group on a mission over Nazi-occupied Europe. Visible is Lockheed/Vega B-17G-70-VE Flying Fortress (serial 44-8579).

From Podington, the group flew almost 300 operational missions over Nazi-Occupied Europe. Missions were flown to Wilhelmshaven, a tyre plant at Hanover, airfields near Paris, an aircraft factory at Nantes, and a magnesium mine and reducing plant in Norway.

Although handicapped by weather conditions, enemy fire, and insufficient fighter protection, the 92nd bombed aircraft factories in central Germany on 11 January 1944, and received a Distinguished Unit Citation for the mission.

The group took part in the intensive campaign of heavy bombers against the German aircraft industry during Big Week, 20–25 February 1944. After that, it attacked V-weapon sites in France; airfields in France, Germany, and the Low Countries, and industrial targets in France, Germany, and Belgium, making concentrated strikes on oil and transportation facilities after October 1944.

In addition to strategic missions, the 92nd performed some interdictory and support operations, assisting the Normandy invasion in June 1944 by hitting gun emplacements, junctions, and marshalling yards in the beachhead area, supporting ground forces at Saint-Lô during the breakthrough in July 1944, bombing gun positions and bridges to aid the airborne assault on the Netherlands in September 1944, participating in the Battle of the Bulge, from December 1944 to January 1945, by attacking bridges and marshalling yards in and near the battle area and bombing airfields near the landing zone to cover the airborne assault across the Rhine in March 1945.

After V-E Day, the 92nd Bomb Group Moved to Istres Air Base, France, in June 1945, where the unit transported troops from Marseille to Casablanca for return to the United States of America. The group was inactivated in France on 28 February 1946, where the personnel demobilised and its B-17 aircraft were sent to storage.

===== Medal of Honor =====
92d Bombardment Group Flight Officer John C. Morgan, co-pilot, received the Medal of Honor for action aboard a B-17 during a mission over Europe on 26 July 1943. His aircraft was attacked by enemy fighters, the pilot suffered a brain injury which left him in a crazed condition. For two hours, Morgan flew in formation with one hand at the controls and the other holding off the struggling pilot who was attempting to fly the plane. Finally another crew member was able to relieve the situation and the B-17 made a safe landing at Podington.

==== 479th Antisubmarine Group ====
The ground echelon of the Army Air Forces Antisubmarine Command 479th Antisubmarine Group moved to Podington in November 1943, after its air echelon was inactivated at RAF Dunkeswell in Devon. From Podington, the groups' ground echelons of its headquarters and attached operational squadrons were reassigned to various Eighth Air Force units as replacements, and the group being disbanded on 11 November.

==== RAF Podington unit emblems ====
American unit emblems based at RAF Podington
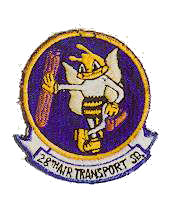
Emblem of the 28th TCS.

Emblem of the 15th BS.

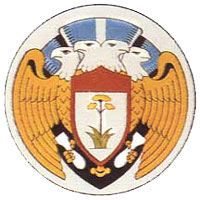
Emblem of the 100th BG.

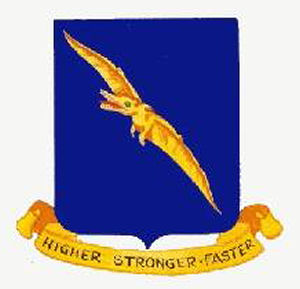
Emblem of the 92nd BG.

=== Air Ministry use ===
The United States Army Air Forces (USAAF) returned Podington to the Royal Air Force in July 1945, and the airfield was retained by the Air Ministry for storage. As late as 1960, Ministry of Defence (MoD) personnel were assigned to Podington looking after several million sandbags.

In 1961, a public inquiry was made by a member of Parliament with regards to the need by the MoD to maintain millions of Second World War sandbags, and the outcome of the investigation was the sale of Podington to private interests later that year.

Light aircraft and glider flying continued from Podington airfield until the late 1960s.

== Main units ==
The main military and subsequent civilian units and organisations based at RAF Podington throughout its military and subsequent civilian history were:

- 4th Antisubmarine Squadron – November 1943
- 5th Photographic Reconnaissance Squadron
- 6th Antisubmarine Squadron — November 1943
- 8th Bomber Command Combat Crew Replacement Unit
- 13th Photographic Reconnaissance Squadron
- 15th Bomber Squadron (Light)
- 19th Antisubmarine Squadron
- 22nd Antisubmarine Squadron
- 28th Troop Carrier Squadron
- 92nd Bombardment Group
- 100th Bombardment Group
- 325th Bombardment Squadron
- 326th Bombardment Squadron
- 327th Bombardment Squadron
- 352nd Bombardment Squadron
- 407th Bombardment Squadron
- 479th Antisubmarine Group
- Northamptonshire Gliding Club
- Royal Air Forces Association Gliding Club
- Tiger Moth Flying Group

== Current use ==
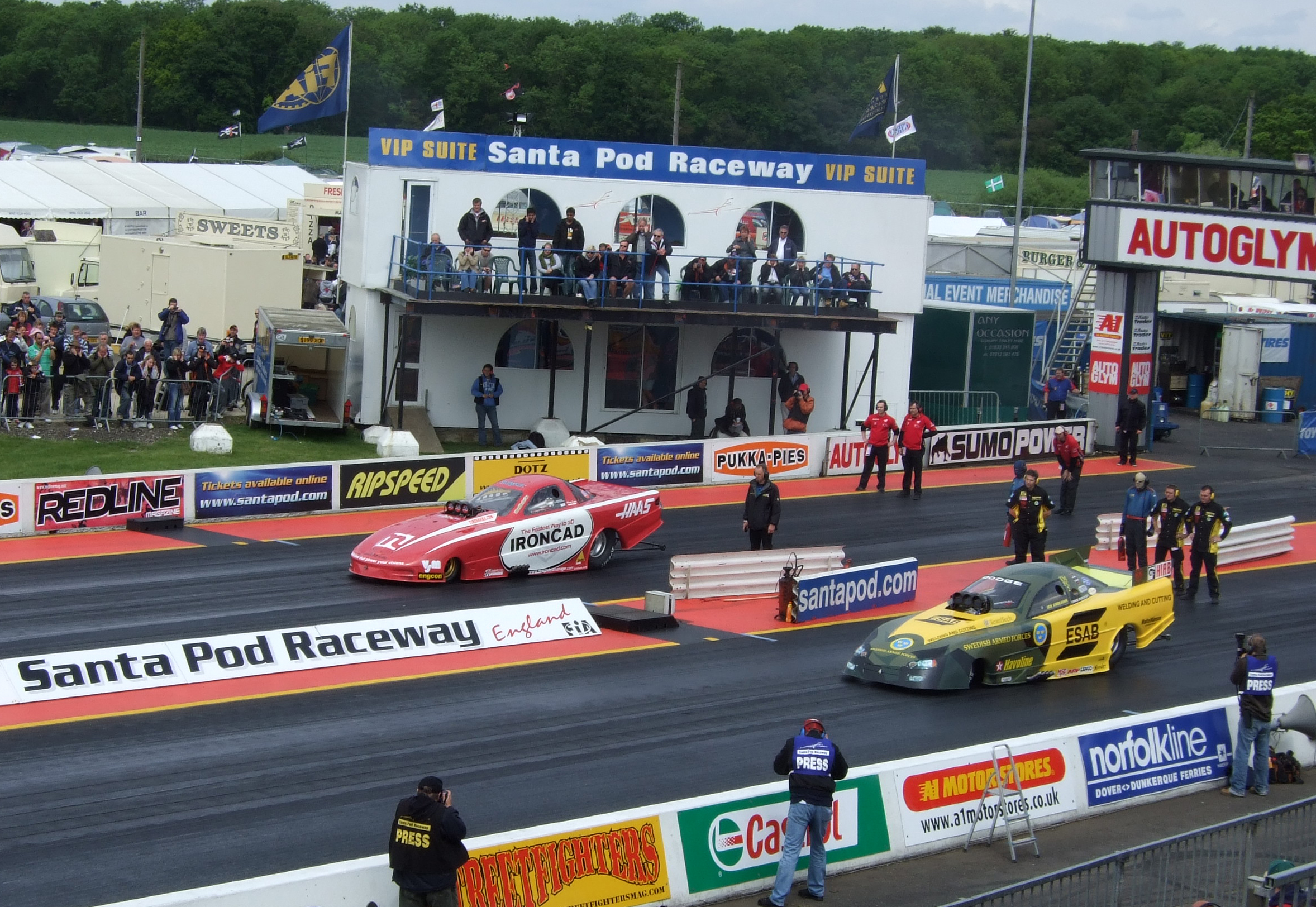
Santa Pod Raceway

With the end of military control, some airfield demolition and concrete removal was performed in the early 1960s, however before all the airfield runways were ground into aggregate, a group of drag racing enthusiasts approached the owners to use its former main runway as a drag racing strip. In 1964, an agreement was reached for what became Santa Pod Raceway, which opened during Easter weekend, 1966. Now informally known as 'The Pod', it is the premier drag racing facility in the United Kingdom, and a top circuit for European dragster racing.

Its main runway was used in the title sequences for The Prisoner, a British television drama series about science-fiction and espionage.

In 1972, the concrete was resurfaced with asphalt and Santa Pod became a major European centre for drag racing.

Some of the buildings of the former technical site remain, though most have succumbed to vandalism or demolition. The two main T-2 hangars are gone; one was dismantled and the other lost in a fire. The former air traffic control tower is one of the few to have been converted into an unusual private house. Those buildings that remain are generally in use by local businesses, though some are derelict. The old Headquarters and Operations Block in particular have seen recent use as a stables, they are not in the best of condition. The perimeter track remains in many places, though reduced in width, and the runways have long since gone (with the exception of the portion of the former main runway now in use as the drag racing track).

On 26 May 2013, a ceremony and dedication service took place to officially unveil an inscribed granite memorial stone. Organised by the Airfields of Britain Conservation Trust (ABCT), the service included the chief executive of Santa Pod Raceway, chief of ABCT, an air officer of the Royal Air Force, and standard bearers of the Royal British Legion, and culminated with a flypast consisting of a Lancaster bomber aircraft flanked by Hurricane and Spitfire fighters from the Battle of Britain Memorial Flight (BBMF).

== See also ==
- List of former Royal Air Force stations
