= 22nd Attack Squadron =

22d Attack Squadron

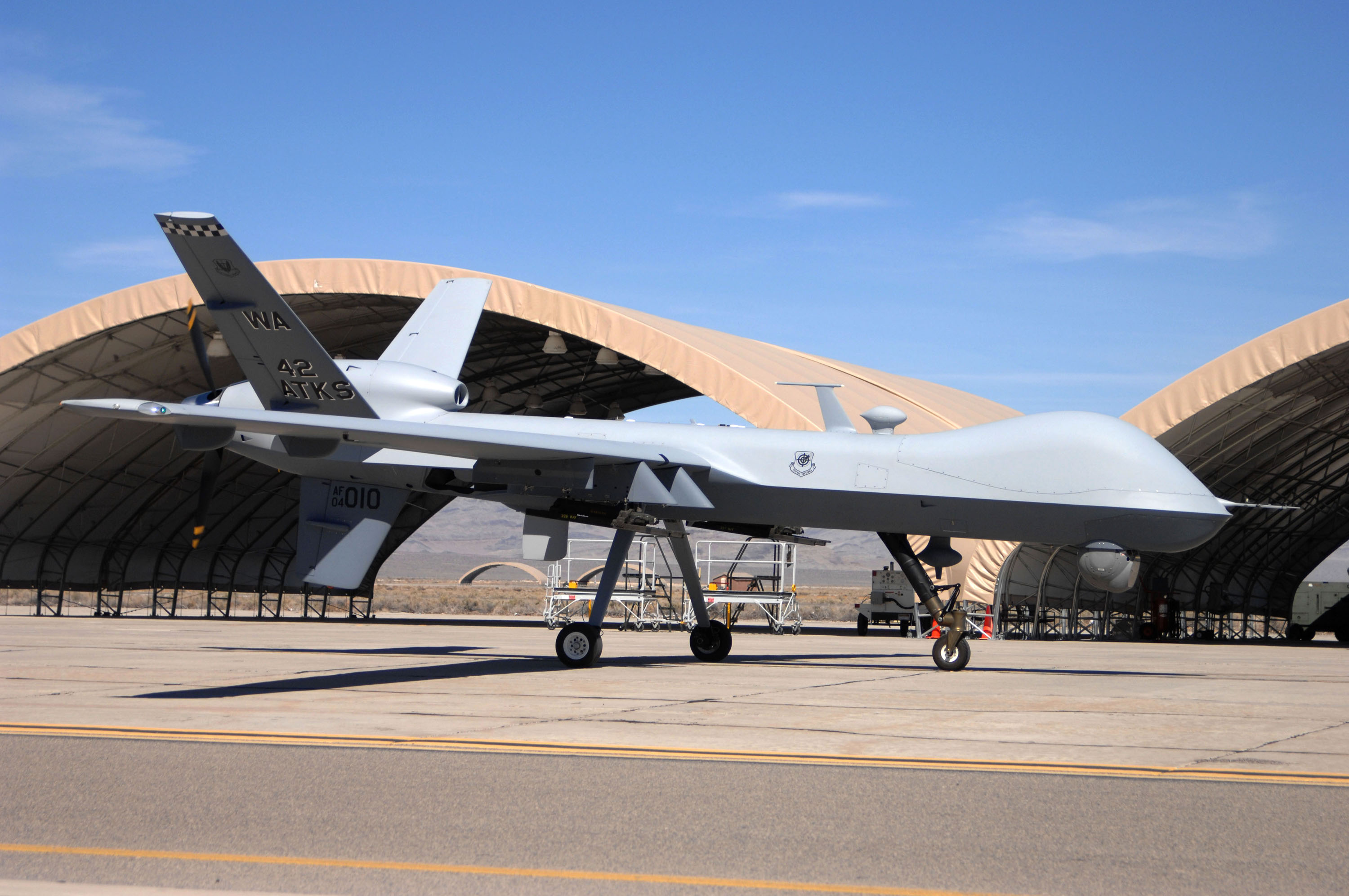
- MQ-9 Reaper at Creech Air Force Base
- Active: 1941–1943; 1965–1988; 1988–1991; 2012–present
- Country: United States
- Branch: United States Air Force
- Role: Unmanned aerial vehicle operation
- Part of: Air Combat Command
- Engagements: European Theater of Operations; Vietnam War
- Decorations: Presidential Unit Citation; Air Force Meritorious Unit Award; Air Force Outstanding Unit Award with Combat "V" Device; Air Force Outstanding Unit Award; Republic of Vietnam Gallantry Cross with Palm; Vietnam First Class Civil Actions Medal With Palm

Insignia
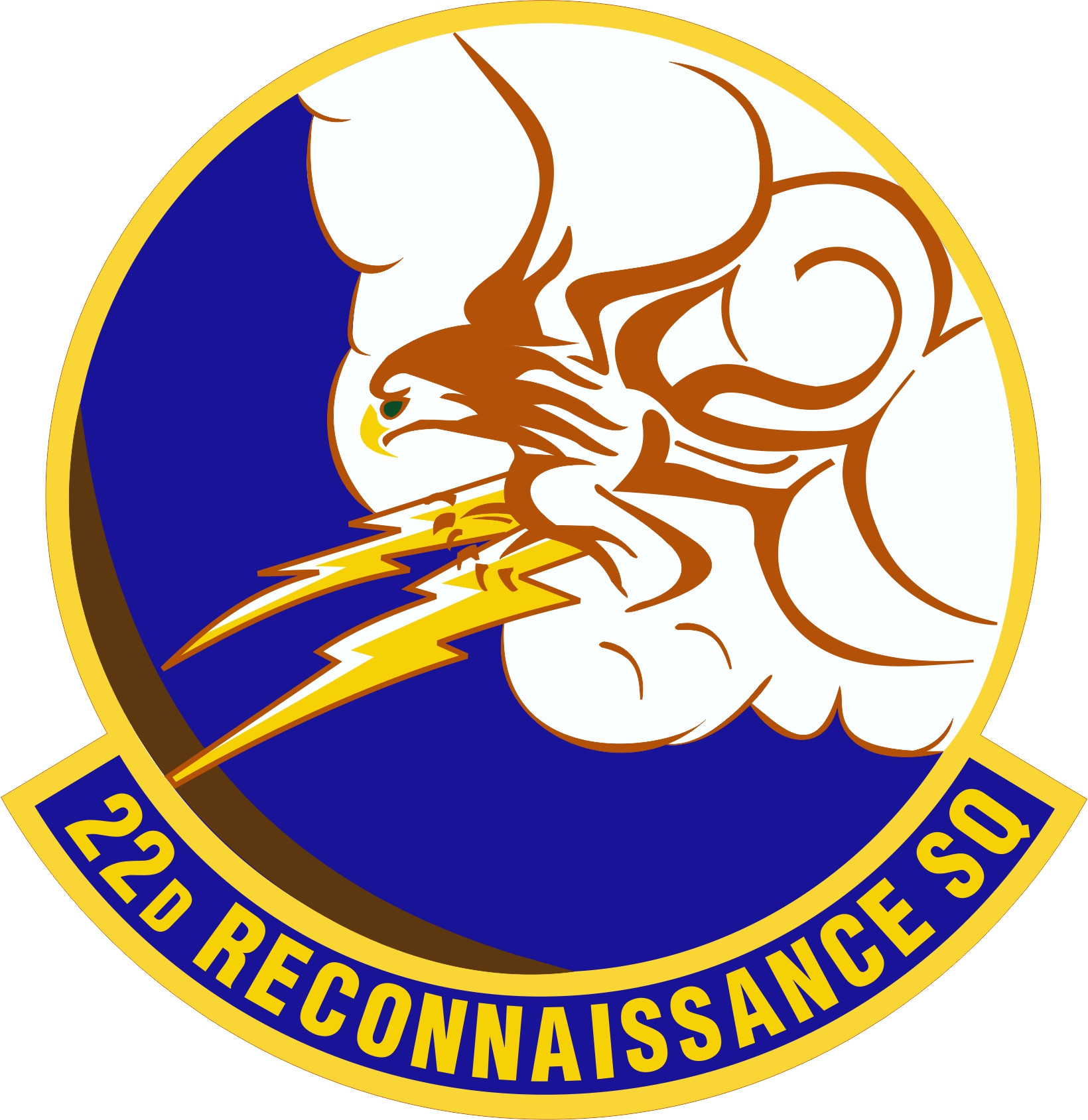
- 22d Reconnaissance Sq emblem (Note: Approved 6 January 2014.)

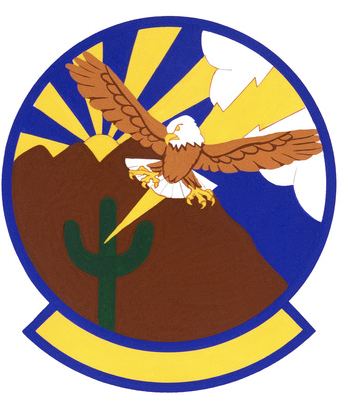
- 22d Tactical Air Support Training Squadron emblem (Note: Approved 8 March 1989.)

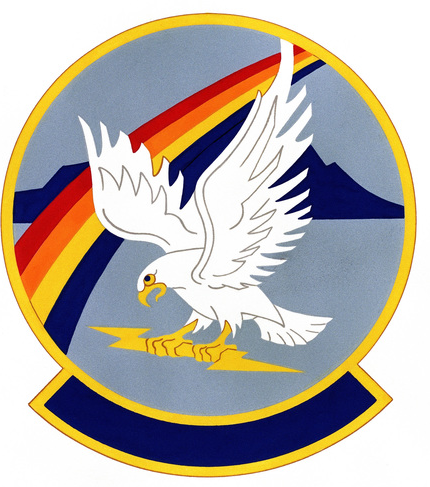
- 22d Tactical Air Support Squadron emblem (1987)

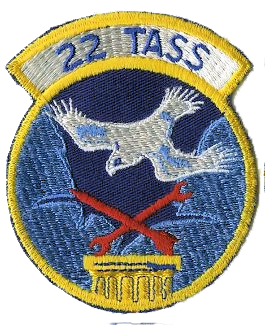
- Patch with 22d Tactical Air Support Squadron emblem (Early)

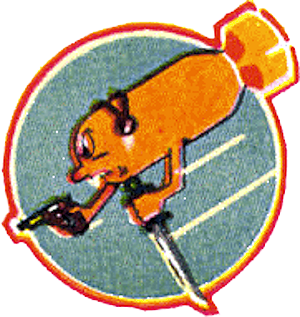
- Patch with 46th Bombardment Squadron emblem (Note: Approved 8 January 1943. Description: Over and through a light blue disc, border yellow orange, piped white, a large yellow aerial bomb with caricatured face expressing anger, grasping an automatic revolver in the right hand and a commando dagger in the left hand, both proper; between ear phones over top of bomb nose, white speed lines.)

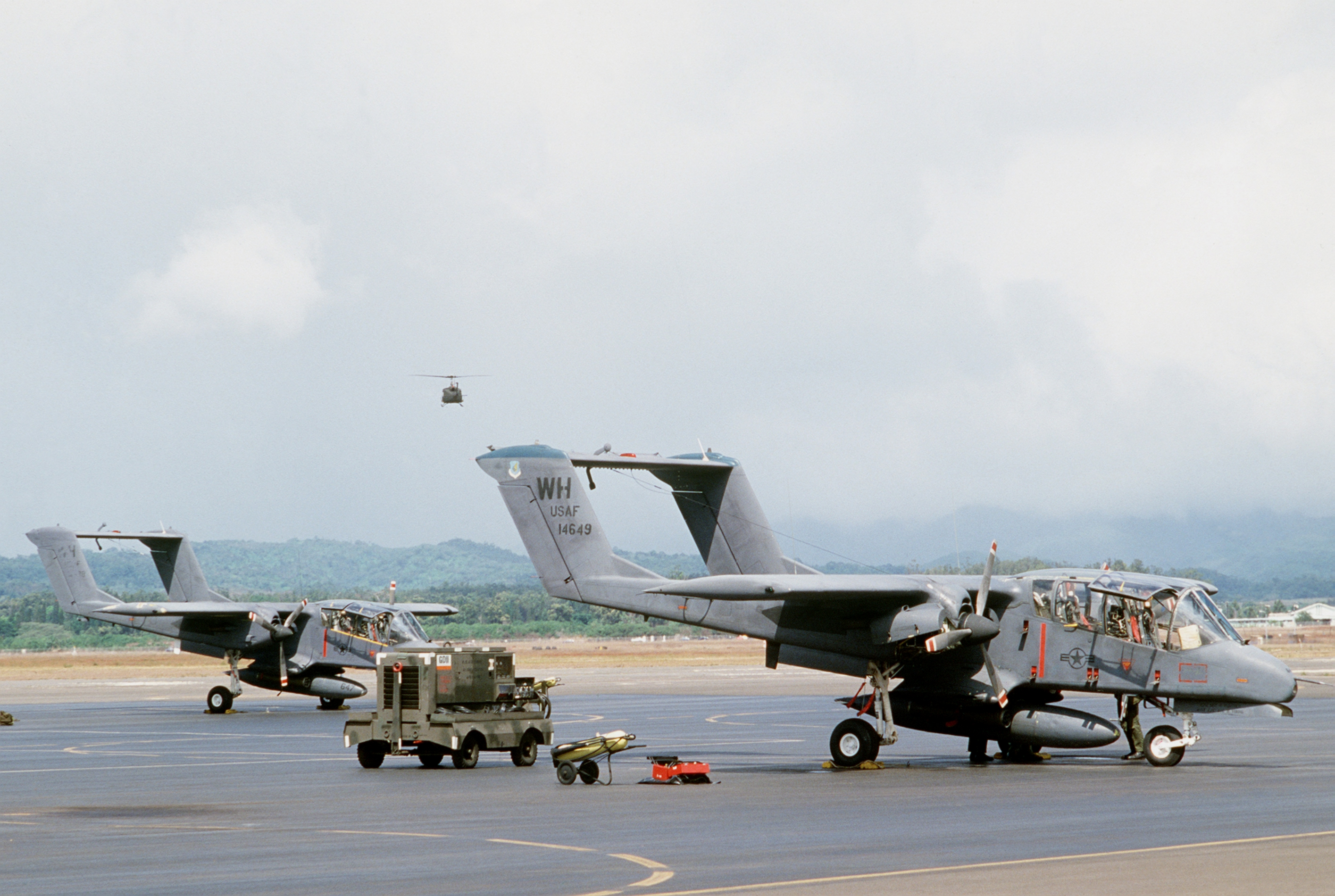
Right front view of two OV-10 Bronco aircraft from the 22nd Tactical Air Support Squadron, Wheeler Field, Hawaii, as pre-flight operations take place during Exercise Opportune Journey 84.

See 46th Bomb Squadron for the Strategic Air Command squadron

The 22nd Attack Squadron is a United States Air Force unit assigned to the 432d Wing Air Combat Command at Creech Air Force Base near Indian Springs, Nevada. It operates Unmanned aerial vehicles, including the General Atomics MQ-9 Reaper, and provides combat support, surveillance, and reconnaissance. The squadron has been activated on five occasions since its formation in World War II, and has seen combat service in both the early years of the war and during the Vietnam War. The unit has also undergone multiple reactivations and redesignations throughout its history.

== History ==
=== World War II ===
The squadron was first activated at March Field, California in January 1941 as the 46th Bombardment Squadron, one of the three original squadrons of the 41st Bombardment Group. The squadron moved to Davis-Monthan Field, Arizona and trained there with Douglas B-18 Bolos. Following the attack on Pearl Harbor, the squadron moved to Muroc Bombing Range and conducted antisubmarine patrols off the Pacific Coast from bases in California until the summer of 1942.

The squadron moved to the Atlantic Coast in July 1942 and its air echelon was attached to Army Air Forces Antisubmarine Command in October and continued its patrols in this area. The squadron formally joined Antisubmarine Command in March 1943, when it became the 22d Antisubmarine Squadron (Heavy) equipped with B-24. In June, 1943 the air echelon moved to England, conducting operations over the Bay of Biscay. The ground echelon remained in the United States and was inactivated in October 1943 as US Navy assumed the antisubmarine mission. The squadron assisted in the transition until the air echelon was disbanded in November.

Antisubmarine patrol flights were conducted in the squadron's assigned areas, producing a situation map that was continuously updated with enemy and friendly forces, convoys, and other pertinent information. The antisubmarine patrols also produced an enemy dispersion chart showing the disposition of all known enemy submarines in the entire Atlantic area.

=== Vietnam War ===
The 22d Tactical Air Support Squadron (Light) was organized at Binh Thuy Air Base, South Vietnam, on 8 May 1965. It provided aircrews in Vietnam to direct air strikes for tactical aircraft operating within the Tactical Air Control System. Visual reconnaissance, convoy escort, and other missions were conducted as directed by the Tactical Air Commander, and aircraft and maintenance were provided in support of these operations within IV Corps, South Vietnam, as directed by Seventh Air Force. The squadron provided aircraft and personnel in support of the Theater Indoctrination School, and field and transient maintenance support of USAF aircraft at Binh Thuy Air Base. The 22nd operated the Cessna O-1 Bird Dog aircraft, 1965–1971; and the Cessna O-2 Skymaster aircraft, 1967–1971.

In January 1970, 22nd TASS completed the turn over of all its forward operating locations in IV Corps and handed its mission of supporting the Army of the Republic of Vietnam (ARVN) in IV Corps to the Republic of Vietnam Air Force (RVNAF). It relocated its headquarters to Bien Hoa Air Base in III Corps. 19th Tactical Air Support Squadron, also based at Bien Hoa, transferred to 22nd TASS all the personnel, aircraft and other equipment supporting ARVN forces in III Corps. 19th TASS retained for itself the assets supporting the American ground forces in the region. Within a year, 22nd TASS completed in III Corps the task it had accomplished in IV Corps. It turned over control of all the forward operating locations and the mission of supporting ARVN forces based in III Corps to the RVNAF. On 15 January 1971, the remaining personnel and other resources of the 22d were absorbed by the 19th TASS, and the 22d was unmanned and non-operational until it transferred W/O/P/E to Wheeler Air Force Base, Hawaii, on 15 May 1971.

Over the course of the war, the 22d suffered four killed in action. Aircraft losses were 13 O-1s and three O-2s.

=== Hawaii service ===
At Wheeler the 22d, using the Cessna O-2, organized, trained, and equipped assigned personnel to provide the Air Force Component Commander with a joint force, capable of operating and maintaining a tactical air support subsystem for ground forces requiring close air support, tactical air reconnaissance and tactical airlift.

The squadron also provided Direct Air Support Center and Tactical Air Control Party personnel and equipment to support US Army units in Hawaii. During 1982, the 22d participated in a number of exercises and prepared plans for conversion to the North American OV-10 Bronco. Converted to the OV-10 aircraft, August–October 1983. Supported U.S. Army on the ground with TACPs creating a network which provided the Army with immediate air support and, in the air, with OV-10 forward air control support. Participated in numerous exercises with US and allied army ground units throughout the Far East.

It was inactivated on 22 September 1988. It was then redesignated 22d Tactical Air Support Training Squadron on 1 October 1988 and reactivated on 14 October 1988. Its inactivation was on 30 September 1991.

=== Recent activities ===
In September 2025, Capt. Carol Stephens, an MQ-9 Reaper pilot with the 22nd Attack Squadron, received the Safety Officer Award Recognition from the Rotary Clubs of Southern Nevada for combat mission performance and community service.

== Lineage ==
22d Antisubmarine Squadron

- Constituted as the 46th Bombardment Squadron (Medium) on 20 November 1940

Activated on 15 January 1941
Redesignated: 22d Antisubmarine Squadron (Heavy) on 3 March 1943
Disbanded on 11 November 1943

- Reconstituted and consolidated with the 22d Tactical Air Support Squadron as the 22d Tactical Air Support Squadron on 19 September 1985

22d Attack Squadron

- Constituted as the 22d Tactical Air Support Squadron, Light and activated on 26 April 1965 (not organized)

Organized on 8 May 1965

- Consolidated with the 22d Antisubmarine Squadron on 19 September 1985

Inactivated on 22 September 1988

- Redesignated 22d Tactical Air Support Training Squadron on 1 October 1988

Activated on 14 October 1988
Inactivated on 30 September 1991

- Redesignated 22d Reconnaissance Squadron

Activated on 10 September 2012
Redesignated 22d Attack Squadron on 15 May 2016

=== Assignments ===
- 41st Bombardment Group, 15 January 1941 (air echelon attached to Army Air Forces Antisubmarine Command on 13 October 1942, to 25th Antisubmarine Wing after 20 November 1942)
- Army Air Forces Antisubmarine Command, 3 March 1943 (remained attached to 25th Antisubmarine Wing)
- 25th Antisubmarine Wing, 8 March 1943
- 479th Antisubmarine Group, 14 August-11 November 1943
- Pacific Air Forces, 26 April 1965 (not organized)
- 2d Air Division, 8 May 1965
- 505th Tactical Control Group, 8 November 1965
- 504th Tactical Air Support Group, 8 December 1966
- 5th Tactical Control Group, 15 May 1971
- 6486th Air Base Wing, 30 September 1971
- 15th Air Base Wing, 1 November 1971
- 326th Air Division, 4 April 1980 – 22 September 1988
- 602d Tactical Air Control Wing, 14 October 1988 – 30 September 1991
- 732d Operations Group, 10 September 2012 – present

=== Stations ===
- March Field, California, 15 January 1941
- Davis-Monthan Field, Arizona, 18 May 1941
- Muroc Bombing Range, California, 10 December 1941
- Hammer Field, California, 26 February 1942
- Naval Air Station Alameda, California, 9 May 1942
- Hammer Field, California, 3 July 1942
- Marine Corps Air Station Cherry Point, North Carolina, 28 August 1942
- Bluethenthal Field, North Carolina, 9 April 1943
- RAF Dunkeswell (Station 173), England, 20 August 1943 (air echelon)

Ground echelon remained at Bluethenthal Field until September 1943, then moved to Salt Lake City Army Air Base, Utah, where it was inactivated on 30 October 1943

- RAF Podington (Station 109), England, 1–11 November 1943 (air echelon)
- Binh Thuy Air Base, South Vietnam, 8 May 1965
- Bien Hoa Air Base, South Vietnam, 15 January 1970
- Wheeler Air Force Base, Hawaii, 15 May 1971 – 22 September 1988
- Davis-Monthan Air Force Base, Arizona, 14 October 1988 - 30 September 1991
- Creech Air Force Base, Nevada, 10 September 2012 – present

=== Aircraft ===
- Douglas B-18 Bolo, 1941–1942
- Lockheed A-29 Hudson, 1942–1943
- Boeing B-17 Flying Fortress, 1942–1943
- North American B-25 Mitchell, 1943
- Lockheed B-34 Ventura, 1943
- Consolidated B-24 Liberator, 1943
- Cessna O-1 Bird Dog, 1965–1971
- Cessna O-2 Skymaster, 1967–1971; 1971–1983
- North American OV-10 Bronco, 1983–1988
- General Atomics MQ-1 Predator, 2012–present
- General Atomics MQ-9 Reaper, 2012–present
