= 304th Bombardment Group =

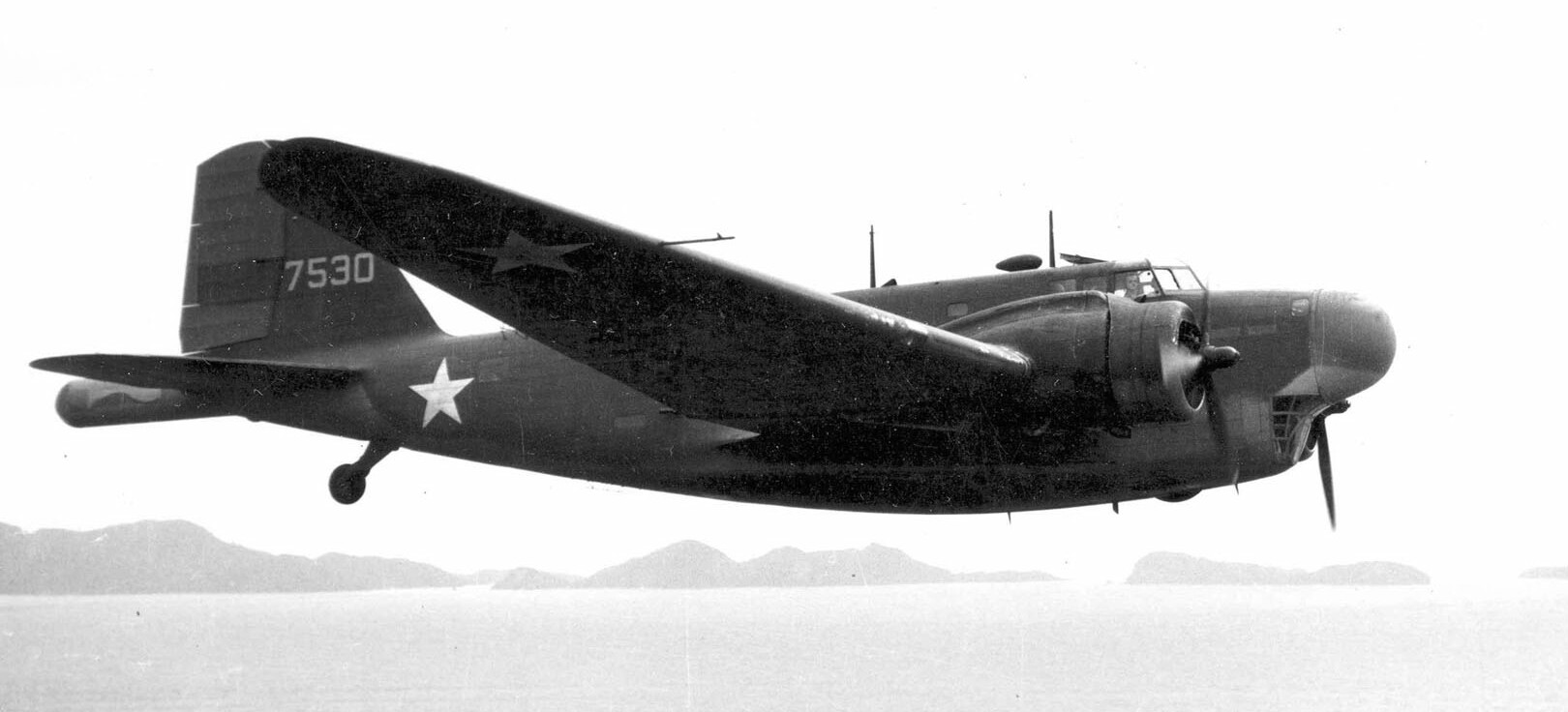
- B-18 Bolo with a MAD tail boom for antisubmarine operations (Note: Aircraft is Douglas B-18B Bolo, serial 37-530, originally built as a B-18A.)
- Active: 1942–1942
- Country: United States
- Branch: United States Air Force
- Role: Antisubmarine warfare
- Motto: Aquila non Captat Muscas (Latin for 'The Eagle Does Not Catch Flies')
- Engagements: Antisubmarine Campaign

Insignia
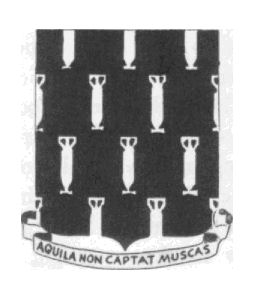
- 304th Bombardment Group emblem (Note: Approved 7 November 1942. Description: Azure, seme of drop bombs or.)

The 304th Bombardment Group is an inactive United States Army Air Forces unit. It was activated as a heavy bomber unit in January 1942. In October, it moved to Langley Field, Virginia, from which it participated in antisubmarine warfare until it was inactivated on 30 December 1942.

== History ==
The group was activated at Salt Lake City Army Air Base in July 1942. It was assigned the 361st, 362d, 363d, and 421st Bombardment Squadrons (Note: The 421st was constituted as the 32d Reconnaissance Squadron (Heavy), but was redesignated before activating in July.) In September, the group moved to Geiger Field, Washington, where it received personnel and began training.

In late October 1942, the group moved from the west coast to Langley Field, Virginia, where it began antisubmarine warfare operations, using Boeing B-17 Flying Fortress, Douglas B-18 Bolo, Consolidated B-24 Liberator and Douglas A-20 Havoc bombers to fly patrols along the east coast. The 304th also trained crews for antisubmarine patrol duty overseas. The 421st Squadron did not move with the group to Langley, but to Saint John's, Newfoundland, and was reassigned to Newfoundland Base Command in early November. In late November, the group's remaining squadrons were redesignated as antisubmarine squadrons.

In the fall of 1942, the Kriegsmarine began to equip its U-boats with radar receivers capable of detecting the Royal Air Force (RAF)'s long-wave radars used for air-to-surface-vessel radar (ASV). This enabled the subs to dive, avoiding detection while on the surface. RAF's Coastal Command requested reinforcements from the Army Air Forces in the form of B-24s equipped with ASV radar operating in the microwave band. In response, the 361st Squadron's air echelon was dispatched to RAF St Eval, England on 10 November to support Coastal Command. On arrival in England, the 361st was attached to VIII Bomber Command for operations.

In November 1942, Army Air Forces Antisubmarine Command organized its units into two wings, reflecting the Navy's desire that forces in a sea frontier be unified in a single command. In December the group was inactivated and its squadrons transferred to the 25th Antisubmarine Wing, which commanded Army Air Forces antisbmarine forces operating off the Atlantic coast.

== Lineage ==
- Constituted as the 304th Bombardment Group (Heavy) on 28 January 1942

Activated on 15 July 1942
Inactivated on 30 December 1942

=== Assignments ===
- II Bomber Command, 15 July 1942
- Army Air Forces Antisubmarine Command, 29 October 1942 – 30 December 1942

=== Squadrons ===
- 361st Bombardment Squadron (later 1st Antisubmarine Squadron): 15 July 1942 – 30 December 1942 (air echelon attached to VIII Bomber Command, after 10 November 1942).
- 362d Bombardment Squadron (later 18th Antisubmarine Squadron): 15 July 1942 – 30 December 1942
- 363d Bombardment Squadron (later 19th Antisubmarine Squadron): 15 July 1942 – 30 December 1942
- 421st Bombardment Squadron: 15 July – 6 November 1942

=== Stations ===
- Salt Lake City Army Air Base, Utah, 15 July 1942
- Geiger Field, Washington, 15 September 1942
- Ephrata Army Air Field, Washington, 1 October 1942
- Langley Field, Virginia, 29 October – 30 December 1942

=== Campaign ===
Campaign Streamer	Campaign	Dates	Notes
	Antisubmarine	29 October 1942–30 December 1942	

== See also ==
- B-17 Flying Fortress units of the United States Army Air Forces
- B-24 Liberator units of the United States Army Air Forces
