= 6th Air Defense Missile Squadron =

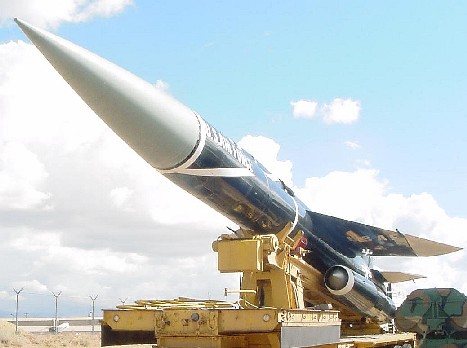
- CIM-10 BOMARC
- Country: United States
- Branch: United States Air Force
- Role: antisubmarine warfare, airlift, air defense
- Size: squadron
- Engagements: European Theater of Operations; Southwest Pacific Theater
- Decorations: Philippine Republic Presidential Unit Citation

Insignia
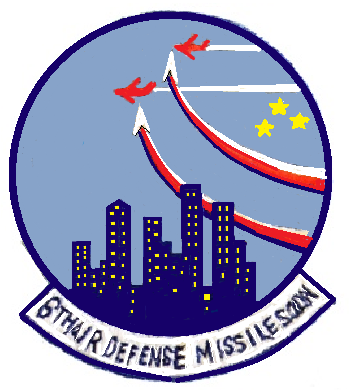
- 6th Air Defense Missile Squadron emblem (Note: Approved 16 June 1960. Description: On a disc of light blue sky, a formation of three Air Force golden yellow stars in sinister chief between two red stylized aircraft flying fesswise in chief leaving white vapor trails to sinister chief and two white missiles pointing upward and intercepting the aircraft, leaving wide Air Force blue, red, and white trails arched to sinister; issuing from base and surmounting the lower missile trail, a silhouetted skyline of tall buildings Air Force blue, windows indicated Air Force golden yellow. Significance: The skyline at night indicates the large metropolitan area over which the missile squadron stands guard. The two skyward-bound missiles and the two aircraft represent the mission of the unit to seek, intercept, and destroy. The sky and stars symbolize the vast area over which this unit stands eternal vigilance.)

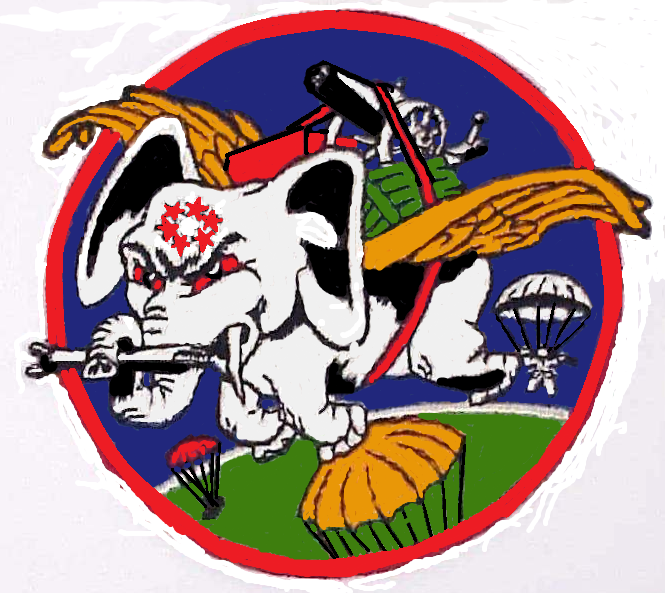
- 6th Combat Cargo Squadron emblem (Note: Approved 8 August 1944. Description: Over and through a disc per fess debased, arched, medium blue and green, border red, piped white, a caricatured white elephant, winged yellow-orange, in flight with six red stars in orle on forehead, carrying a stretcher roll in trunk and a field cannon proper with a red and green box strapped on back by a red belt around waist all above a yellow, red and white parachute in base, dexter base, and sinister base respectively.)

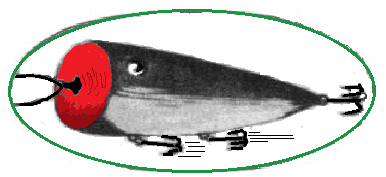
- 6th Antisubmarine Squadron emblem (Note: Approved 25 September 1942. Description: on a white elongated horizontal oval a gray bass plug with reddish head and white open eye with three black triple hooks speed lines behind.)

The 6th Air Defense Missile Squadron was an air defense unit of the United States Air Force. It was assigned to the New York Air Defense Sector of Aerospace Defense Command, at Suffolk County Air Force Base, New York, where it was inactivated on 15 December 1964. The squadron had its headquarters at Suffolk County Air Force Base, while the firing batteries of the squadron were at the nearby Suffolk County Air Force Base Missile Annex.

The squadron was consolidated in 1985 with two earlier units. The first is the 6th Antisubmarine Squadron (previously the 5th Reconnaissance Squadron and 393d Bombardment Squadron). This squadron participated in the antisubmarine campaign in the Atlantic from bases in the United States and Europe until disbanding in 1943, when the Navy assumed the land based antisubmarine mission from the Army Air Forces.

The other predecessor of the squadron is the 6th Combat Cargo Squadron, which participated in the Southwest Pacific Theater, earning a Philippine Republic Presidential Unit Citation. After V-J Day, it formed part of the army of occupation in Japan, until inactivating in 1946. It was disbanded while inactive in 1948.

These three units were consolidated into the renamed 6th Tactical Missile Squadron. The consolidated squadron has, up until early 2020, never been active.

== History ==
=== World War II antisubmarine operations ===
What is now the 6th Tactical Missile Squadron was originally activated as the 3d Reconnaissance Squadron in January 1941 and attached to the 13th Bombardment Group per General Headquarters Air Force's policy of attaching one reconnaissance squadron to each bombardment group. equipped with North American B-25 Mitchells as part of First Air Force. After the United States entered World War II the squadron was ordered to search for German U-boats and to fly aerial coverage of friendly convoys initially off the southeast coast. It then moved to Mitchel Field, New York to patrol the sea approaches to New York City. In April 1942, the squadron was redesignated as the 393d Bombardment Squadron (Medium). (Note: Under this designation, the unit should not be confused with the 393d Bombardment Squadron, Very Heavy that dropped both atomic bombs in 1945. While flying B-47 aircraft in the 1950s, that unit was also designated as the 393d Bombardment Squadron, Medium.)

Later in 1942, the squadron was redesignated as 6th Antisubmarine Squadron, and reassigned to 25th Antisubmarine Wing of Army Air Forces Antisubmarine Command (AAFAC). After joining AAFAC, it moved to Westover Field, Massachusetts to patrol the sea approaches to Boston, then to Gander, Newfoundland to fly antisubmarine patrols over North Atlantic convoy routes. The squadron was reassigned to 479th Antisubmarine Group in Southwest England in August 1943 and flew killer hunts against German U-boats in the Bay of Biscay off the western coast of France from Brest south to the Spanish border. Along this part of the occupied French coast were major Kriegsmarine U-boat bases at Brest, Lorient, Saint-Nazaire, La Rochelle (La Pallice) and Bordeaux. Its ground echelon was ordered in September, just prior to inactivation of AAFAC, to move to Salt Lake City Army Air Base, Utah, where it was inactivated on 30 October 1943, while the air echelon was disbanded in England in late November 1943 with squadron aircraft reassigned to the United States Navy. Squadron personnel remaining in England were reassigned to Eighth Air Force units as replacement personnel.

=== World War II Pacific Theater and occupation of Japan ===
The second birth of the squadron was in 1944, when it was activated as the 6th Combat Cargo Squadron at Syracuse Army Air Base, New York as part of the 2d Combat Cargo Group. After training in New York and moving briefly to Baer Field, Indiana for overseas processing, the squadron moved to the Pacific. Operating from Biak Island, it flew passengers and cargo to American bases in Australia, New Guinea, the Admiralty Islands, and the Philippines. The squadron also dropped supplies to American and Philippine resistance forces. It transported personnel and supplies to the Ryukus and evacuated casualties on the return flights until moving to Okinawa. It then transported personnel and equipment to Japan and ferried liberated prisoners of war to the Philippines. It moved to Japan, where it served as part of the Occupation Forces, until it was inactivated in 1946. The squadron was disbanded in 1948.

=== Cold War air defense ===
The third activation of the squadron was as the 6th Air Defense Missile Squadron on 1 February 1959.

In 1955, plans were made that the Suffolk County Air Force Base Missile Annex should be ready in February 1960. It was activated as the second operational BOMARC complex on 1 December 1959 (four missiles were ready by 1 January). It was part of the New York Air Defense Sector. The annex included a launch area with 56 Mode II Launcher Shelters in two flights—that meant that two compressor buildings were available to simultaneously ready two missiles to the "Standby" stage prior to "Fire-up".

The squadron stood alert from 1960 to 1964, equipped with IM-99 (later CIM-10) BOMARC surface to air antiaircraft missiles. The squadron was tied into a Semi-Automatic Ground Environment (SAGE) direction center which could use analog computers to process information from ground radars, picket ships and airborne aircraft to accelerate the display of tracking data at the direction center to quickly direct the missile site to engage hostile aircraft.

The BOMARC missile site was located 3 miles (4.8 km) southwest of Suffolk County AFB at 40°50′00″N 072°40′51″W. Although geographically separated from the base, the annex was an off base facility of Suffolk County Air Force Base and the squadron command, administrative and logistic elements were on the base. The squadron ceased operations on 1 December 1965 and was inactivated on 15 December 1964.

In 1985, the squadron was consolidated with the 6th Antisubmarine Squadron and the 6th Combat Cargo Squadron, but has never been active with this designation.

== Lineage ==
6th Antisubmarine Squadron

- Constituted as the 3d Reconnaissance Squadron (Medium) on 20 November 1940

Activated on 15 January 1941
Redesignated 393d Bombardment Squadron (Medium) on 22 April 1942
Redesignated 6th Antisubmarine Squadron (Heavy) on 29 November 1942
Disbanded on 11 November 1943

- Reconstituted on 19 September 1985 and consolidated with the 6th Combat Cargo Squadron and the 6th Air Defense Missile Squadron as the 6th Tactical Missile Squadron

6th Combat Cargo Squadron

- Constituted as the 6th Combat Cargo Squadron on 25 April 1944

Activated on 1 May 1944
Inactivated on 15 January 1946
Disbanded on 8 October 1948

- Reconstituted on 19 September 1985 and consolidated with the 6th Antisubmarine Squadron and the 6th Air Defense Missile Squadron as the 6th Tactical Missile Squadron

6th Air Defense Missile Squadron

- Constituted as the 6th Air Defense Missile Squadron on 12 January 1959

Activated on 1 February 1959
Inactivated on 15 February 1964

- Consolidated with the 6th Combat Cargo Squadron and the 6th Antisubmarine Squadron as the 6th Tactical Missile Squadron

=== Assignments ===
- 2d Bombardment Wing, 15 January 1941 (attached to the 13th Bombardment Group)
- III Bomber Command, 5 June 1941 (remained attached to the 13th Bombardment Group)
- 13th Bombardment Group, 25 February 1942
- 25th Antisubmarine Wing, 30 November 1942
- Army Air Forces Antisubmarine Command, 8 June 1943
- 479th Antisubmarine Group, 14 August – 11 November 1943
- 2d Combat Cargo Group, 1 May 1944 – 15 January 1946
- New York Air Defense Sector, 1 February 1959 – 15 December 1964

=== Stations ===
- Langley Field, Virginia, 15 January 1941
- Orlando Army Air Base, Florida, 7 June 1941
- Mitchel Field, New York, 22 January 1942
- Westover Field, Massachusetts, 3 August 1942 – 1 April 1943
- RCAF Gander, Newfoundland, c. 12 April 1943
- RAF Dunkeswell, England, 21 August 1943 (air echelon only after September)

Salt Lake City Army Air Base, Utah, September – 30 October 1943 (ground echelon)

- RAF Podington, England, November – 11 November 1943 (air echelon)
- Syracuse Army Air Base, New York, 1 May 1944
- Baer Field, Indiana, 8 October 1944 – 27 October 1944
- Biak Island, Papua New Guinea, November 1944 (operated from Samar), 8 March 1945 – c. 25 March 1945
- Dulag, Leyte, Philippines, 26 March 1945
- Bolo Airfield, Okinawa, Ryuku Islands, Japan, 16 August 1945
- Yokota Airfield, Japan, September 1945 – 15 January 1946
- Suffolk County Air Force Base, New York, 1 February 1959 – 15 December 1964

=== Awards and campaigns ===
Award streamer	Award	Dates	Notes
	Philippine Republic Presidential Unit Citation	8 March 1945 – 4 July 1945	6th Combat Cargo Squadron

Campaign Streamer	Campaign	Dates	Notes
	Antisubmarine	7 December 1941 – 21 August 1943	3d Reconnaissance Squadron (later 393d Bombardment Squadron, 6th Antisubmarine Squadron)
	Air Offensive, Europe	21 August 1943 – 11 November 1943	6th Antisubmarine Squadron
	Air Offensive, Japan	November 1944 – 2 September 1945	6th Combat Cargo Squadron
	New Guinea	November 1944 – 31 December 1944	6th Combat Cargo Squadron
	Western Pacific	November 1944 – 2 September 1945	6th Combat Cargo Squadron
	Leyte	November 1944 – 1 July 1945	6th Combat Cargo Squadron
	Luzon	15 December 1944 – 4 July 1945	6th Combat Cargo Squadron
	Southern Philippines	27 February 1945 – 4 July 1945	6th Combat Cargo Squadron
	World War II Army of Occupation (Note: The inscription on the streamer awarded to the squadron would read "Japan", not Europe as shown in the image.)	2 September 1945 – 15 January 1946	6th Combat Cargo Squadron

=== Aircraft and missiles ===
- Douglas B-18 Bolo, 1941–1943
- North American B-25 Mitchell, 1941–1943
- Lockheed A-29 Hudson, 1942
- Consolidated B-24 Liberator, 1943
- Douglas C-47 Skytrain, 1944, 1945
- Curtiss C-46 Commando, 1944–1945
- Boeing IM-99 (later CIM-10) BOMARC, 1959–1964

== See also ==
- List of United States Air Force missile squadrons
