= 24th Tactical Missile Squadron =

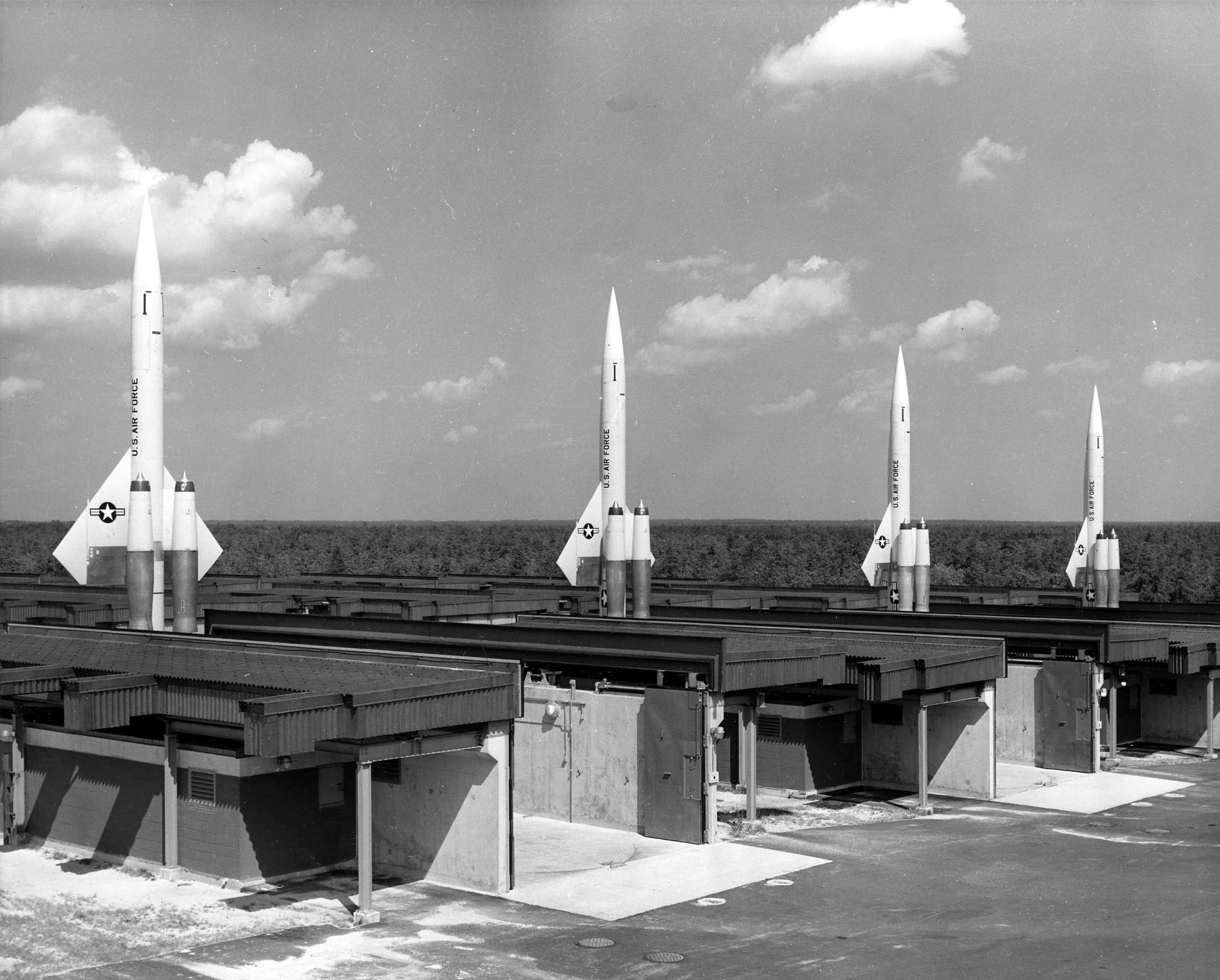
- CIM-10 Bomarc missile battery near McGuire Air Force Base, New Jersey in 1960
- Active: 1941-1943, 1957-1958, 1960-1972
- Country: United States
- Branch: United States Air Force
- Role: Bombardment, antisubmarine, cruise missile, surface-to-air missile
- Size: squadron
- Motto: Say When (1960-1972)
- Engagements: European Theater of Operations
- Decorations: Air Force Outstanding Unit Award

Insignia
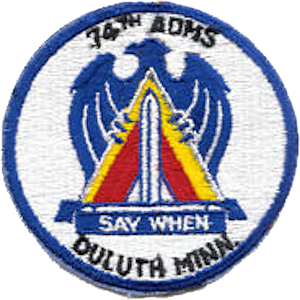
- Patch with 74th Air Defense Missile Squadron emblem

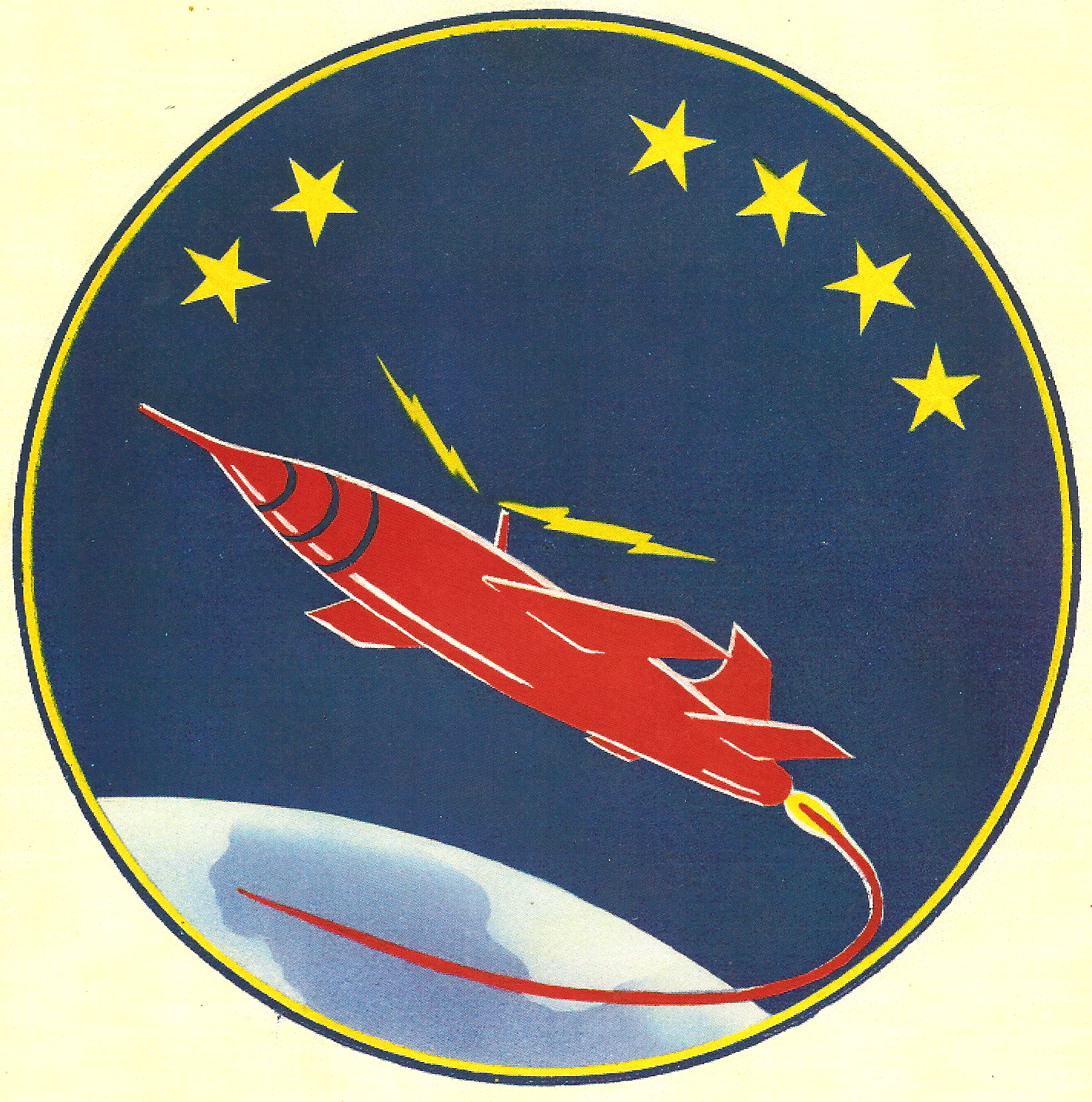
- 24th Tactical Missile Squadron emblem (Note: Approved 29 July 1957. Description: On a disc of Air Force blue sky, edged Air Force golden yellow, fimbriated of the first [color mentioned], a red stylized missile, highlighted white, rising, nose to dexter chief, three stripes of the field['s color] encircling the nose, the antenna emitting two Air Force golden yellow lightning flashes; all between six stars arched of the last [color mentioned], two in dexter chief, four in sinister chief, and the edge of the globe in base, water areas light blue, land areas white; a red and Air Force golden yellow vapor trail edged white circling over the globe. Significance: The red stylized missile denotes the armament capability of the missile and designates this squadron as a missile unit. The lightning flashes above the missile represent the guidance features of the missile. The three blue stripes around the nose denote the three distinct types of teams authorized in the squadron maintenance and operations branches. The Earth indicates that the missile capabilities are not limited by the geographic features of location. The yellow border symbolizes the organization of the squadron by providing unity to the various functions in the squadron.)

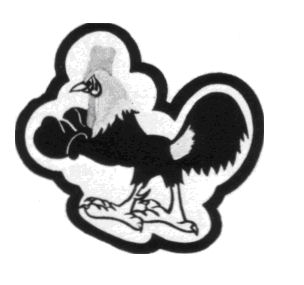
- 40th Bombardment Squadron emblem (Note: Approved 7 February 1942. Description: On an irregular white patch edged with black, a brown, green, and black fighting cock with red comb and yellow beak and feet.)

The 24th Tactical Missile Squadron is an inactive United States Air Force unit. It was last active as the 74th Air Defense Missile Squadron assigned to the 23d Air Division of Aerospace Defense Command, stationed near Duluth Municipal Airport, Minnesota, where it was inactivated in 1972. The squadron's earliest predecessor was active early in World War II as an antisubmarine unit in the Caribbean and Europe until its mission was transferred to the United States Navy. During the Cold War it was a training unit for Matador cruise missiles. Its most recently active predecessor was an air defense missile squadron in the northern United States from 1960 to 1972.

== History ==
=== World War II Antisubmarine Operations ===
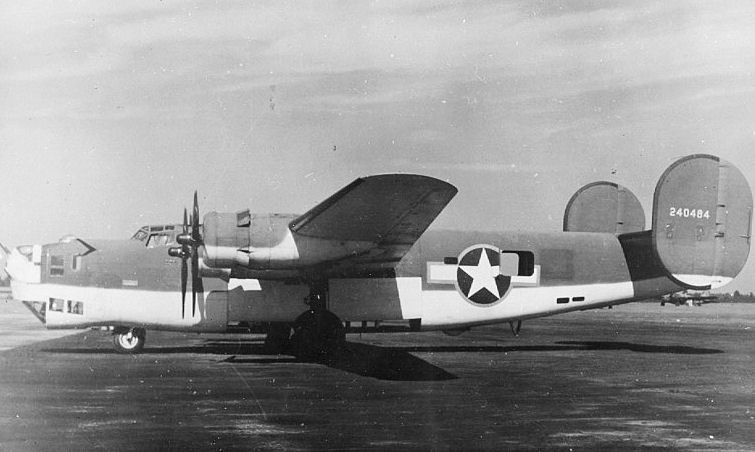
B-24D in antisubmarine camouflage

The squadron was first activated as the 40th Bombardment Squadron (Medium) in early 1941 as one of the four squadrons of the 13th Bombardment Group, an element of First Air Force, equipped with B-18 Bolos at Langley Field, Virginia.

After the United States entered World War II the group was ordered to search for German U-boats and to fly aerial coverage of friendly convoys off the northeast Atlantic, protecting the Boston and New York City shipping lanes. The squadron deployed to Guantanamo Bay Naval Base, Cuba and was attached to the Caribbean Sea Frontier of the United States Navy to patrol northern Caribbean waters, then to airfields in Jamaica, Trinidad and Surinam during 1942, flying antisubmarine missions.

The squadron was redesignated as the 4th Antisubmarine Squadron and was assigned to the 25th Antisubmarine Wing of the Army Air Forces Antisubmarine Command in November 1942, when the 13th Group was inactivated and returned to Mitchel Field, New York before being reassigned to RCAF Station Gander, Newfoundland, flying antisubmarine patrols over the Grand Banks of Newfoundland and North Atlantic shipping lanes performing convoy escort patrols.

The squadron moved to southwestern England in June 1943 and was reassigned to 479th Antisubmarine Group in July. It flew killer hunts against German U-boats in the Bay of Biscay off the western coast of France from Brest south to the Spanish border. Along this part of the occupied French coast were major Kriegsmarine U-boat bases at Brest, Lorient, Saint-Nazaire, La Rochelle (La Pallice) and Bordeaux. The squadron's air echelon inactivated in late October 1943 with its aircraft being reassigned to the United States Navy after the inactivation of AAF Antisubmarine Command. Squadron personnel were reassigned to Eighth Air Force units as replacement personnel.

=== Cold War Tactical Missile Training ===
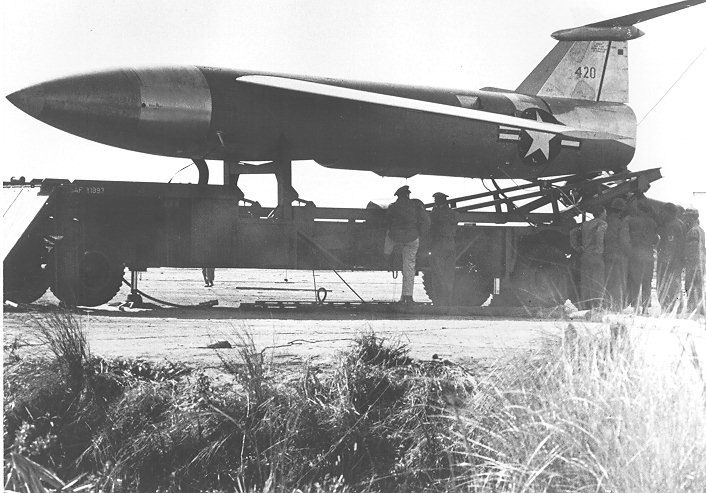
Matador Missile used for training

The squadron was activated for a second time on 15 March 1957 as the 24th Tactical Missile Squadron and assigned to Ninth Air Force's 589th Tactical Missile Group (TMG). It trained for operation of TM-61 Matador tactical cruise missiles at Orlando AFB. When the 17th Tactical Missile Squadron deployed to Taiwan in April 1958, the 24th was transferred to the 588th TMG. It engaged in crew training with the 589th but never received any missiles or deployment orders before inactivating.

The 24th and 588th TMG were programmed to deploy to South Korea during the fall of 1958, but instead, the unit was inactivated on 15 July 1958. The personnel and equipment of the 588th were reassigned to the newly formed 58th Tactical Missile Group at Osan AB, South Korea, while the 310th Fighter-Bomber Squadron at Osan gave up its F-86 Sabres and became the 310th Tactical Missile Squadron, becoming a Matador squadron and absorbing the personnel of the 588th TMG en masse.

=== Cold War Air Defense ===
The squadron was activated for the third time on 1 April 1960 as the 74th Air Defense Missile Squadron at Duluth Municipal Airport. It stood alert during the Cold War, starting in August 1961 with IM-99A (later CIM-10) BOMARC surface to air antiaircraft missiles. In August 1961, the squadron upgraded to the IM-99B. The squadron was tied into a Semi-Automatic Ground Environment (SAGE) direction center which could use analog computers to process information from ground radars, picket ships and airborne aircraft to accelerate the display of tracking data at the direction center to quickly direct the missile site to engage hostile aircraft. It became nonoperational on 1 April 1972, and was inactivated on 30 April 1972.

The BOMARC missile site was located 10 miles (16 km) northeast of Duluth MAP at 46°55′56″N 091°53′00″W. Although geographically separated from the base, it was an off base facility of Duluth MAP and the squadron received administrative and logistical support from the military facilities at Duluth Airport.

=== Consolidation ===
The 40th Bombardment Squadron and the 74th Air Defense Missile Squadron were consolidated with the 24th Tactical Missile Squadron on 19 September 1985, while remaining in inactive status.

== Lineage ==
4th Antisubmarine Squadron

- Constituted as the 40th Bombardment Squadron (Medium) on 20 November 1940

Activated on 15 January 1941

- Redesignated as the 4th Antisubmarine Squadron (Heavy) on 29 November 1942

Disbanded on 11 November 1943

- Consolidated with the 24th Tactical Missile Squadron and the 74th Air Defense Missile Squadron as the 24th Tactical Missile Squadron on 19 September 1985

74th Air Defense Missile Squadron

- Constituted as the 74th Air Defense Missile Squadron (BOMARC) on 17 December 1959

Activated on 1 April 1960
Inactivated on 30 April 1972

- Consolidated with the 40th Bombardment Squadron and the 24th Tactical Missile Squadron as the 24th Tactical Missile Squadron on 19 September 1985

24th Tactical Missile Squadron

- Constituted as the 24th Tactical Missile Squadron on 9 November 1956
- Activated on 15 March 1957
- Inactivated on 15 July 1958
- Consolidated with the 40th Bombardment Squadron and the 74th Air Defense Missile Squadron on 19 September 1985

=== Assignments ===
- 13th Bombardment Group, 15 January 1941 (air echelon attached to US Navy Caribbean Sea Frontier, 30 August 1942 - 9 October 1942 and 16 October 1942 - 15 November 1942 and to 99th Bombardment Squadron 9 October 1942 – 16 October 1942)
- 25th Antisubmarine Wing, 30 November 1942
- Army Air Forces Antisubmarine Command, 8 June 1943
- 479th Antisubmarine Group, 8 July 1943 - 11 November 1943
- 589th Tactical Missile Group, 15 March 1957
- 588th Tactical Missile Group, April 1958 - 15 July 1958
- Duluth Air Defense Sector, 1 April 1960
- 29th Air Division, 1 April 1966
- 23d Air Division, 19 November 1969 - 30 April 1972

=== Stations ===
- Langley Field, Virginia, 15 January 1941
- Orlando Army Air Base, Florida, 7 June 1941
- Westover Field, Massachusetts, 22 January 1942
- Langley Field, Virginia, 16 June 1942 - ca. 6 June 1942
- Mitchel Field, New York, 3 August 1942 (part of air echelon operated from Guantanamo, Cuba 30 August 1942, Vernam Field, Jamaica, 14 September 1942, Edinburgh Field, Trinidad, 6 October 1942, Zanderij Field, Surinam, 9 October 1942. Edinburgh Field, Trinidad, 16 October 1942 – 15 November 1942)
- Gander Airport, Newfoundland, ca. 8 June 1942 -23 June 1943
- RAF St Eval, England, 30 June 1943
- RAF Dunkeswell, England, 6 August 1943
- RAF Podington, England, November 1943 - 11 November 1943
- Orlando Air Force Base, Florida, 15 March 1957 – 15 July 1958
- Duluth Municipal Airport, 1 April 1960 – 30 April 1972

=== Awards and campaigns ===
Award streamer	Award	Dates	Notes
	Air Force Outstanding Unit Award	1 January 1968-31 May 1969	74th Air Defense Missile Squadron

Campaign Streamer	Campaign	Dates	Notes
	Antisubmarine, American Theater	7 December 1941 – 30 June 1943	40th Bombardment Squadron (later 4th Antisubmarine Squadron)
	Antisubmarine, EAME (European Theater)	30 June 1943 – 11 November 1943	4th Antisubmarine Squadron
	Air Offensive, EAME (European Theater)	30 June 1943 – 11 November 1943	4th Antisubmarine Squadron

=== Aircraft and Missiles ===
- B-18 Bolo, 1941–1943 American Theater
- B-24 Liberator, 1943 European Theater (ETO / EAME)
- TM-61 Matador (authorized, but not equipped)
- IM-99A (later CIM-10) BOMARC, 1960-1972

== See also ==
- List of United States Air Force missile squadrons
