= 479th Antisubmarine Group =

- Active: 1943
- Country: United States
- Branch: United States Army Air Forces
- Role: Antisubmarine Warfare

The 479th Antisubmarine Group was a group of the United States Army Air Forces. Throughout its existence it was assigned to the Army Air Forces Antisubmarine Command. It was last based at RAF Podington, England. It was inactivated on 11 November 1943.

The group comprised existing squadrons reassigned from Army Air Forces Antisubmarine Command or the 25th Antisubmarine Wing at Langley Field, Virginia and deployed to RAF St Eval in Cornwall England. Its mission was to fly killer hunts against German U-boats in the Bay of Biscay off the western coast of France from Brest south to the Spanish border. Along this part of the occupied French coast were major Kriegsmarine U-boat bases at Brest, Lorient, Saint-Nazaire, La Rochelle (La Pallice) and Bordeaux.

At RAF St Eval, the group operated under the control of No. 19 Group of RAF Coastal Command. It flew modified Consolidated B-24 Liberators equipped with specialized aerial depth charges, radar and other antisubmarine detection equipment. The 479th began operations from England on 13 July 1943 and had some success when based in St Eval, sinking two U-boats and sharing another with an RAF Squadron. The 479th's most effective antisubmarine patrols were conducted from 18 July to 2 August 1943, the period in which the group made nearly all of its attacks on enemy U-boats. After that time the enemy avoided surfacing during daylight and adopted a policy of evasion, but the group continued its patrols, often engaging Luftwaffe fighter interceptor aircraft (Junkers Ju 88; Focke-Wulf Fw 200; Messerschmitt Bf 109; Messerschmitt Bf 110) in combat. The 479th ASG lost four Liberators and twenty nine men had been killed in action.

The 479th AG moved to RAF Dunkeswell in Devon during early August 1943 and ended operations in October 1943 after the aerial antisubmarine mission was turned over to the United States Navy. B-24s reassigned to Navy Patrol Bomber Squadron VPB-103, Fleet Air Wing 7 at Dunkeswell and were redesignated as PB4Ys.

Four years after the group was disbanded, the new United States Air Force assumed control over all USAAF units, active or inactive. The group was reconstituted by the USAF in 1985, but not activated.

== Lineage ==
- Constituted as 479th Antisubmarine Group on 1 July 1943

Activated on 8 July 1943
Disbanded on 11 November 1943

- Reconstituted on 31 July 1985 and redesignated 359th Special Operations Group (not active)

== Assignments ==
- Army Air Forces Antisubmarine Command, 8 July – 11 November 1943

== Squadrons ==
- 4th Antisubmarine Squadron: 8 July – 11 November 1943
- 6th Antisubmarine Squadron: 14 August – 11 November 1943
- 19th Antisubmarine Squadron: 8 July – 11 November 1943
- 22d Antisubmarine Squadron: 14 August – 11 November 1943

== Stations ==
- RAF St Eval, England, 8 July 1943
- RAF Dunkeswell, England, 6 August 1943
- RAF Podington, England, 1– 11 November 1943.
