= Suffolk County Air Force Base Missile Annex =

Coordinates: 40.8317708°N 72.6831837°W

The Suffolk County Air Force Base Missile Annex (SAGE codename "BED", ()) was an air defence missile site of the United States Air Force, located 2 mi (3.2 km) west of Suffolk County Air Force Base on Long Island. During the first half of the 1960s it hosted a CIM-10 Bomarc missile site, part of the New York Air Defense Sector.

The annex included a Launch Area with 56 Mode II Launcher Shelters in 2 flights (e.g., 2 compressor buildings were available to simultaneously get 2 missiles to the "Standby" stage prior to "Fire-up".)

== Missile Support Area ==
The Missile Support Area included offices of the Base Commander (Col Fred G. Hook, Jr. in 1959), an OOAMA representative, and the Commander of the 6th Air Defense Missile Squadron; while Boeing Airplane Company support was from an office 5 mi (8.0 km) north in Riverhead, New York. Military police operated from a Security Control and Identification building at the Old Country Road entrance to the annex. Two flights of missile maintenance airmen used the Assembly and Maintenance (A & M) Shop for preparing newly received missiles, repairing BOMARCs that malfunctioned, and periodic recycling. "Missile Recycle" for 6 mo/2 yr component replacement from "ready-storage" used 5 A & M Shop stations after the missile had been transported to the Main Shop Room following defueling and warhead removal at the Launcher Shelter and decontamination at the Fuel Facility. The A & M Shop with 22 rooms included a "Control Room", and a Telecommunication (TELCO) Room with 2 SAGE Digital Data Receivers and a Digital Data Transmitter for communicating missiles' status to the remote launch control center in New Jersey.

=== Interceptor Missile Squadron Operations Center ===
The Interceptor Missile Squadron Operations Center (IMSOC) in the A & M Shop next to the TELCO Room was connected to the "Coaxial Distribution System" for communicating with Electrical Launching Equipment (ELE) in each Launcher Shelter's equipment room. The IMSOC used the "Prelaunch Command System" with a Squadron Supervisor's Station in the IMSOC that included "a desk-type console" with manual controls for acknowledging SAGE "alert orders and other commands". The console controlled missile warm-up (e.g., 2 minutes for IM-99A rocket fuel while 30 seconds was needed for IM-99B: arming of the igniter & activation of gyros, seeker, fuze, etc.) and to maintain the BOMARC at "Standby" (warmed-up & erected) until "Fire-up" by a remote Senior Director's keyed console (fire button) at the launch control center (Weapons Director room) at McGuire DC-01. The console then displayed whether the missile transitioned to the "Launch" or "Malfunction" stage, which determined the subsequent squadron operation needed at the Launcher Shelter (checkout of the empty shelter or deactivation of the faulty missile).

== Civilian use ==
External image
- SAGE Situation Display showing the "BED" missile annex

In 2009 the 187-acre (1 km^{2}) former missile launch complex was being used as a county impound lot and county/FBI shooting range.

The site is a Formerly Used Defense Site (NY29799F12240/C02NY0714).
