= 18th Airborne Command and Control Squadron =

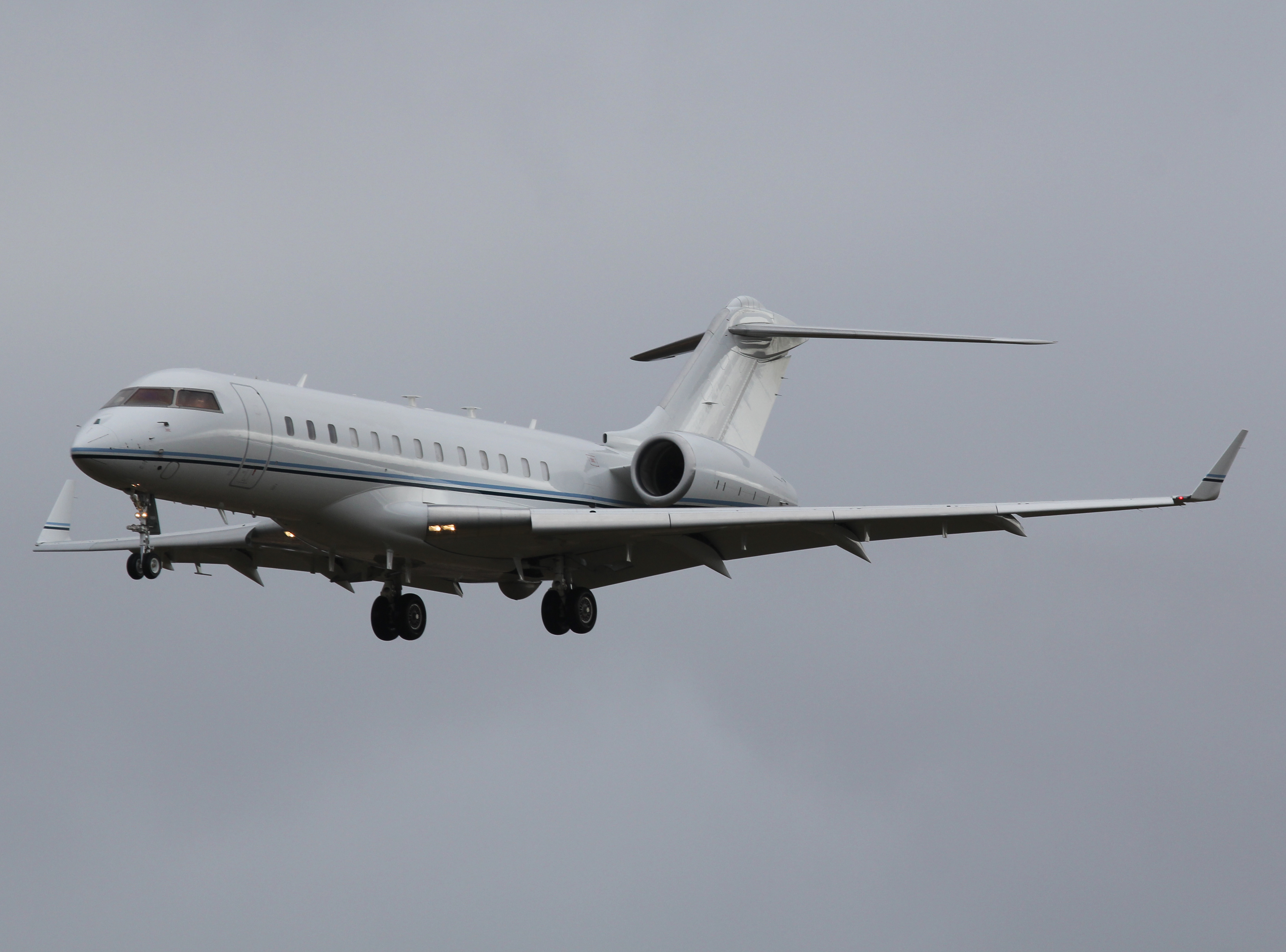
- Bombardier E-11A as flown by the 18th ACCS
- Active: 1942–1945; 1953–1969; 2023–2025
- Country: United States
- Branch: United States Air Force
- Role: Electronic Warfare
- Size: Squadron
- Engagements: European Theater of Operations; Mediterranean Theater of Operations
- Decorations: Distinguished Unit Citation; Air Force Outstanding Unit Award

Insignia
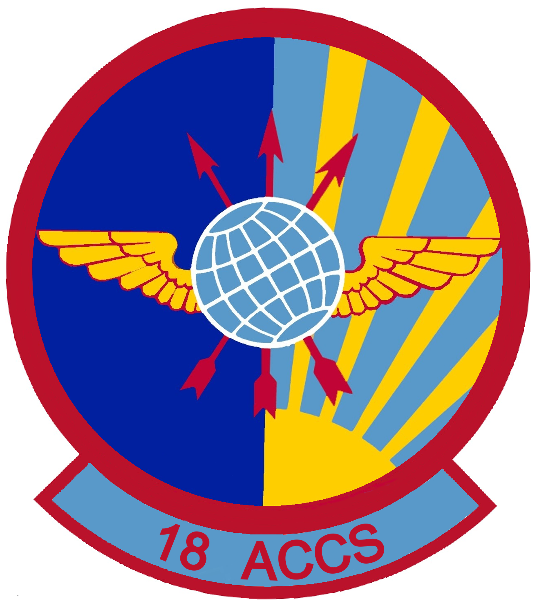
- 18th Airborne Command and Control Squadron emblem

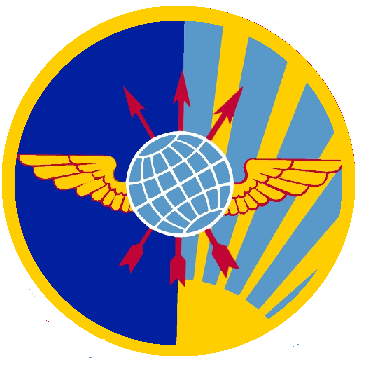
- 28th Military Airlift Squadron emblem

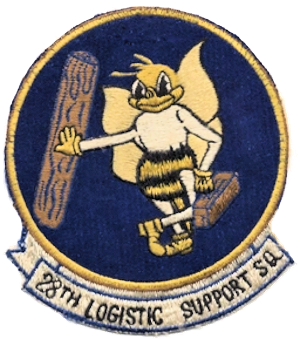
- Patch with 28th Logistics Support Squadron emblem

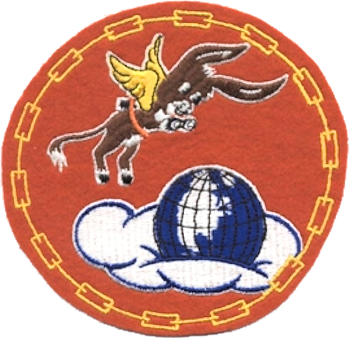
- 28th Troop Carrier Squadron (Note: Approved 25 November 1944. Description: On a light red orange disc, within a border of twenty-eight yellow chain links, a caricatured brown and white donkey with yellow wings, black hoofs and eyes, having a black box strapped on back by light red orange band about stomach, leaping over a medium blue globe, marked with white land areas and black lines of latitude and longitude, resting in a white cloud formation, outlined blue, in sinister base.)

The 18th Airborne Command and Control Squadron is an inactive United States Air Force unit that operated the Bombardier E-11A BACN aircraft.Assigned to the 319th Reconnaissance Wing at Grand Forks AFB, North Dakota, the 18th ACCS is based at Robins AFB, Georgia, since being activated in February 2023. The 18th ACCS gets its lineage from the 28th Transport Squadron and the 28th Logistic Support Squadron, which were both consolidated into the 18th Airborne Command and Control Squadron in 1985.

== History ==
=== World War II ===
Established as the 28th Transport Squadron (Mail & Cargo) on 1 February 1942 at Daniel Field, Georgia. The squadron was equipped with Douglas C-47 Skytrain transports as one of the original four squadrons of the 89th Transport Group. The 89th group provided transition training for transport pilots. However, a little more than three months later, the squadron was reassigned to the 60th Transport Group at Westover Field, Massachusetts, and redesignated as the 28th Transport Squadron.

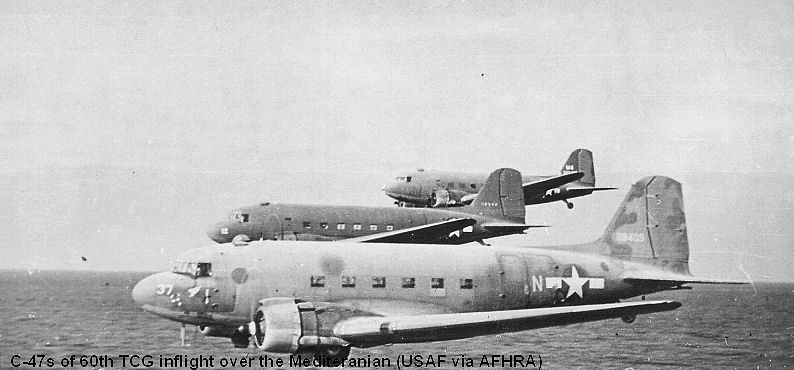
C-47s of the 60th Troop Carrier Group.

The 60th group at Westover was preparing for shipment overseas, and the squadron trained and trained for combat resupply and casualty evacuation missions. Was ordered deployed to England, assigned to Eighth Air Force in June 1942. Assigned fuselage code 3D, the unit was redesignated as the 28th Troop Carrier Squadron on 4 July 1942. Performed intro-theater transport flights of personnel, supply and equipment within England during summer and fall of 1942, reassigned to Twelfth Air Force after Operation Torch invasion of North Africa in November 1942, transporting paratroopers to Oran, Algeria during the early hours of Operation Torch.

In combat, performed resupply and evacuation missions across Morocco, Algeria and Tunisia during North African Campaign. During June 1943, the unit began training with gliders in preparation for Operation Husky, the invasion of Sicily. It towed gliders to Syracuse, Sicily and dropped paratroopers at Catania during the operation. After moving to Sicily, the squadron airdropped supplies to escaped prisoners of war in Northern Italy in October.

The unit provided support for partisans operating in the Balkans. Its unarmed aircraft flew at night over uncharted territory, landing at small unprepared airfields to provide guns, ammunition, clothing, medical supplies, gasoline, and mail to the partisans. It even carried jeeps and mules as cargo. On return trips it evacuated wounded partisans, evadees and escaped prisoners. These operations earned the squadron the Distinguished Unit Citation. It also dropped paratroopers at Megava, Greece in October 1944 and propaganda leaflets in the Balkans in the Mediterranean Theater of Operations until end of combat in Europe, May 1945.

After hostilities ended, was transferred to Waller Field, Trinidad attached to the Air Transport Command Transported personnel and equipment from Brazil to South Florida along the South Atlantic Air Transport Route. Squadron picked up personnel and equipment in Brazil or bases in Northern South America with final destination being Miami, Boca Raton Army Airfield or Morrison Fields in South Florida. Inactivated at the end of July 1945.

=== Special Airlift ===
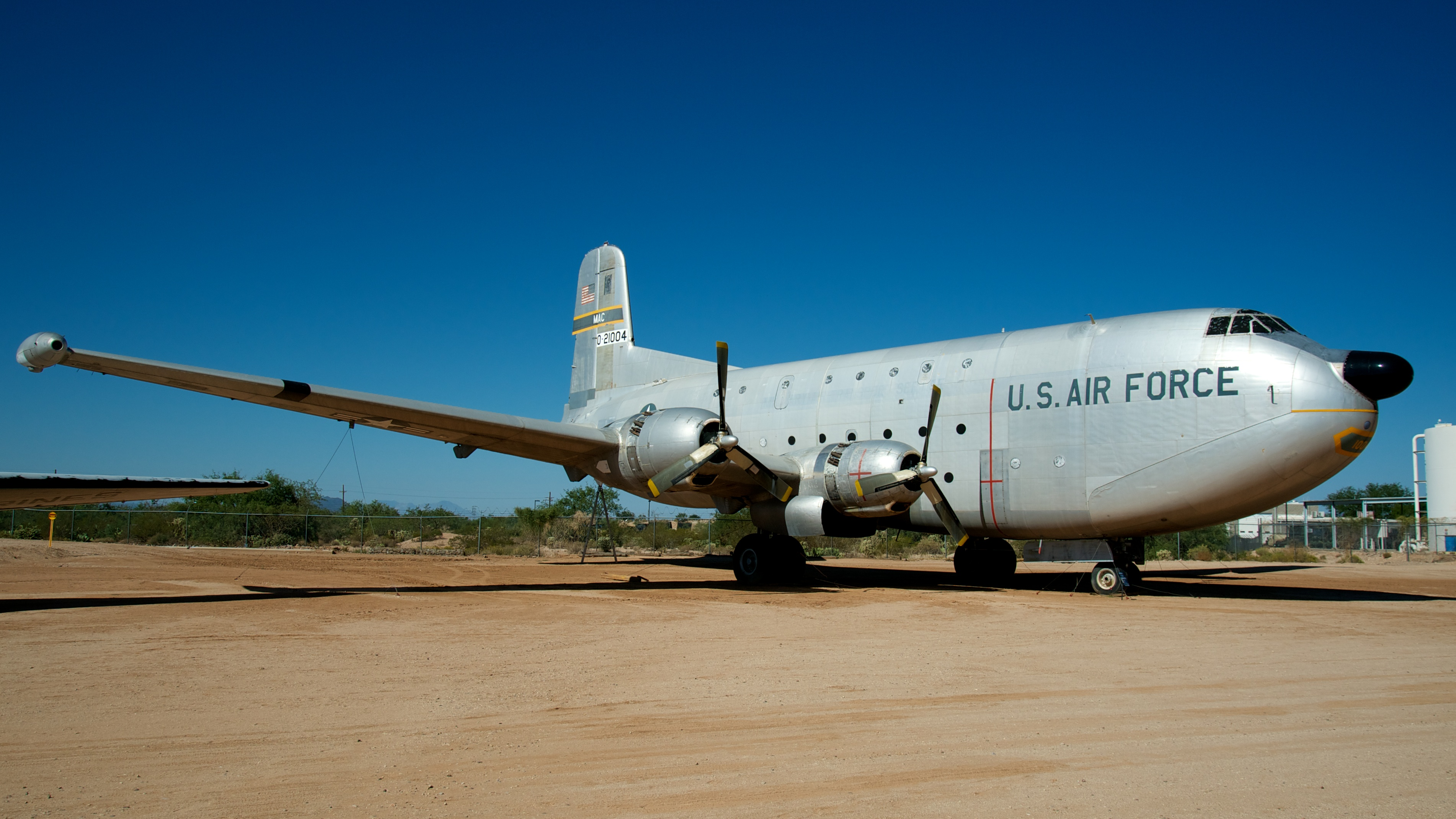
A Douglas C-124 Globemaster II, which was operated by the unit between 1953 and 1969.

The 28th Logistic Support Squadron was activated at Hill Air Force Base, Utah and equipped with Douglas C-124 Globemaster IIs in July 1953. Its mission was to provide worldwide airlift of special weapons and related equipment, with a secondary mission to airlift other Department of Defense cargo as required when space was available.

In 1955, Air Materiel Command organized the 3079th Aviation Depot Wing to exercise command jurisdiction over all its logistic support squadrons. Previously, the 7th, 19th and 28th Logistic Support Squadrons had been assigned to separate air materiel areas. The 3097th Wing also commanded aviation depot groups responsible for the storage and maintenance of special weapons.

In 1962, the squadron was transferred to Military Air Transport Service (MATS)'s 1501st Air Transport Wing at Travis Air Force Base, California. It was redesignated the 28th Air Transport Squadron, but remained at Hill with the same mission (as indicated by the "Special" added to its designation). When MATS became Military Airlift Command in 1966, the squadron was renamed the 28th Military Airlift Squadron while its headquarters, now the 60th Military Airlift Wing, remained at Travis. In the mid-1960s, logistic activity at Hill Increased, particularly in munitions support of operations in Southeast Asia. To improve logistics support to the battlefield, direct airlift missions from Hill to bases in Southeast Asia began. On 3 March 1966, the first squadron Douglas C-124 Globemaster II left Hill for Southeast Asia, loaded with airmunitions. The squadron conducted three flights per week. Airlifting eased overtaxed storage facilities at Travis and reduced cargo transit time by seven days.

In 1967, the 60th wing retired its C-124s and the squadron was reassigned to the 62d Military Airlift Wing, which now had the global special weapons airlift support mission, and operated all MAC C-124s in the western United States. The squadron flew its last mission, from Hill to Cam Ranh Air Base, Republic of Vietnam in March 1969 and was inactivated later that month.

=== Electronic Warfare ===
The 18th Airborne Command and Control Squadron was activated at Robins Air Force Base, Georgia, on 10 February 2023 and assigned to the 319th Reconnaissance Wing at Grand Forks Air Force Base, North Dakota. The squadron received its first Bombardier E-11A BACN on 24 April 2023 and will be fully operational by FY2027. It was inactivated in 2025 and transferred its mission, personnel and aircraft to the 472nd Electronic Combat Squadron, which was simultaneously activated.

== Lineage ==
28th Troop Carrier Squadron

- Constituted as the 28th Transport Squadron (Mail & Cargo) on 19 January 1942

Activated on 1 February 1942
Redesignated 28th Transport Squadron on 19 May 1942
Redesignated 28th Troop Carrier Squadron 4 July 1942
Inactivated on 31 July 1945

- Consolidated with the 28th Military Airlift Squadron on 19 September 1985 as the 18th Airborne Command & Control Squadron

28th Military Airlift Squadron

- Constituted as the 28th Logistic Support Squadron on 28 April 1953

Activated on 8 July 1953
Redesignated 28th Air Transport Squadron, Special on 18 January 1962
Redesignated 28th Military Airlift Squadron, Special on 8 January 1966

- Inactivated on 8 April 1969
- Consolidated with the 28th Troop Carrier Squadron on 19 September 1985 as the 18th Airborne Command and Control Squadron

18th Airborne Command and Control Squadron
Activated on 10 February 2023
Inactivated c. 1 May 2025

=== Assignments ===
- 89th Transport Group 1 February 1942
- 60th Transport Group (later 60th Troop Carrier Group), 19 May 1942 – 31 July 1945
- Ogden Air Materiel Area, 8 July 1953 (attached to 2849th Air Base Wing)
- 3079th Aviation Depot Wing, 8 February 1955
- 1501st Air Transport Wing, 18 January 1962
- 60th Military Airlift Wing, 8 January 1966 (attached to 62d Military Airlift Wing 1–8 July 1967)
- 62d Military Airlift Wing, 8 July 1967 – 8 April 1969
- 319th Operations Group, c. 10 February 2023 – c. 1 May 2025

=== Stations ===
- Daniel Field, Georgia, 1 February 1942
- Harding Field, Louisiana, 8 March 1942
- Westover Field, Massachusetts, 20 May 1942 – 7 July 1942
- RAF Podington (Station 109), England, 28 July 1942
- RAF Aldermaston (Station 467), England, 7 August 1942
- Tafaraoui Airfield, Algeria, 14 November 1942
- Rélizane (Galizan) Airfield, Algeria, 27 November 1942

- Thiersville Airfield, Algeria, 13 May 1943,
- El Djem Airfield, Tunisia, 1 July 1943
- Gela East Airfield, Sicily, Italy, 4 September 1943
- Gerbini Airfield, Sicily, Italy, 28 October 1943
- Pomigliano d'Arco Airfield, Campania, Italy, 8 October 1944 – May 1945
- Waller Field, Trinidad 2 June 1945 – 31 July 1945
- Hill Air Force Base, Utah, 8 July 1953 – 8 April 1969
- Robins Air Force Base, Georgia, c. 10 February 2023 – c. 1 May 2025

=== Aircraft ===
- Douglas C-47 Skytrain, 1942–1945
- Douglas C-124 Globemaster II, 1952–1969
- Bombardier E-11A BACN, 2023–2025

=== Awards and Campaigns ===
Award streamer	Award	Dates	Notes
	Distinguished Unit Citation	28 March 1944-15 September 1944	28th Troop Carrier Squadron
	Air Force Outstanding Unit Award	1 January 1962-31 December 1962	28th Logistic Support Squadron (later 28th Air Transport Squadron)
	Air Force Outstanding Unit Award	1 July 1965-30 June 1966	28th Air Transport Squadron (later 28th Military Airlift Squadron)
	Air Force Outstanding Unit Award	1 July 1966-30 June 1967	28th Military Airlift Squadron

Campaign Streamer	Campaign	Dates	Notes
	Tunisia	14 November 1942 – 13 May 1943	28th Troop Carrier Squadron
	Sicily	14 May 1943 – 17 August 1943	28th Troop Carrier Squadron
	Naples-Foggia	18 August 1943 – 21 January 1944	28th Troop Carrier Squadron
	Rome-Arno	22 January 1944 – 9 September 1944	28th Troop Carrier Squadron
	North Apennines	10 September 1944 – 4 April 1945	28th Troop Carrier Squadron
	Po Valley	3 April 1945 – 8 May 1945	28th Troop Carrier Squadron
	Air Combat, EAME Theater	28 July 1942 – 11 May 1945	28th Troop Carrier Squadron
