= 25th Antisubmarine Wing =

- Active: 1942-1943
- Country: United States
- Branch: United States Air Force
- Role: Anti-Submarine Warfare
- Engagements: American Theater of World War II

The 25th Antisubmarine Wing is an inactive United States Air Force unit. Its last assignment was with the Army Air Forces Antisubmarine Command, based in New York City, New York. It was the principal United States Army Air Forces Unit conducting anti-submarine warfare off the East Coast of the United States and Canada until it was disbanded on 15 October 1943.

In 1985 the wing was reconstituted and redesignated the 525th Combat Crew Training Group, but has never been active with that designation.

== History ==
The 25th Antisubmarine Wing was activated in November 1942 to combat German U-boats in the coastal waters of the United States. The wing's tactical area of responsibility ranged from Labrador south along the Atlantic Coast to the Georgia/Florida border and seaward to approximately 100 miles from coastline. The wing was disbanded on 15 October 1943 when its mission was transferred to United States Navy. Most of the wing's components were transferred to Second Air Force where many of them became cadres for newly forming bombardment groups.

In 1985 the wing was reconstituted as the 525th Combat Crew Training Group, but has never been active since then.

=== Lineage ===
- Constituted as 25th Antisubmarine Wing on 17 November 1942

Activated on 20 November 1942
Disbanded on 15 October 1943
Reconstituted on 31 July 1985 and redesignated 525th Combat Crew Training Group (not active)

=== Assignments ===
- Army Air Forces Antisubmarine Command (later I Bomber Command), 20 November 1942 - 15 October 1943

=== Squadrons ===
- 1st Antisubmarine Squadron: 30 December 1942 – 21 June 1943 (attached to 1st Antisubmarine Group (Provisional), 15 January 1943; 2037th Antisubmarine Wing (Provisional), 1 March 1943 – 21 June 1943)

Langley Field, Virginia. (operated from RAF St Eval), moved to St Eval 13 January 1943

- 2d Antisubmarine Squadron: 14 December 1942 – 21 June 1943 (attached to VIII Bomber Command, 2 January 1943; 1st Antisubmarine Group (Provisional), 15 January 1943; 2037th Antisubmarine Wing (Provisional), 1 March 1943 – 21 June 1943)

Langley Field, Virginia, RAF St Eval after 2 January 1943

- 3d Antisubmarine Squadron (later 819th Bombardment Squadron): 30 November 1942 – 11 October 1943

Dover Army Air Field, Delaware, Fort Dix Army Air Field, New Jersey after 28 February 1943, March Field, California after 22 September 1943

- 4th Antisubmarine Squadron: 30 November 1942 – 8 June 1943

Mitchel Field, New York

- 6th Antisubmarine Squadron: 30 November 1942 – 8 June 1943

Westover Field, Massachusetts, Gander Lake, Newfoundland after ca. 12 April 1943

- 7th Antisubmarine Squadron: (attached ca. 16 December 1942 – 20 April 1943)

Jacksonville Army Air Field, Florida

- 11th Antisubmarine Squadron: 9 December 1942 – 1 October 1943

Fort Dix Army Air Field, New Jersey

- 12th Antisubmarine Squadron (later 859th Bombardment Squadron): 9 December 1942 – 1 October 1943

Langley Field, Virginia, Blythe Army Air Field after 24 September 1943

- 13th Antisubmarine Squadron: 9 December 1942 – 22 September 1943

Grenier Field, New Hampshire

- 14th Antisubmarine Squadron: 9 December 1942 – 7 October 1943

Otis Field, Massachusetts (operated from Langley Field, Virginia 19 July 1943 – 10 August 1943)

- 15th Antisubmarine Squadron: 14 December 1942 – 15 October 1943

Jacksonville Army Air Field, Florida (operated from Langley Field, Virginia - 3 July 1943, Drew Field, Florida - July 1943, Batista Field, Cuba - ca. 1 October 1943)

- 16th Antisubmarine Squadron (later 822d Bombardment Squadron): 14 December 1942 – 11 October 1943

Charleston Army Air Base, South Carolina, Hammer Field, California after 22 September 1943

- 18th Antisubmarine Squadron: 30 December 1942 – 23 October 1943

Langley Field, Virginia

- 19th Antisubmarine Squadron: 30 December 1942 – 8 June 1943

Langley Field, Virginia, Gander Lake, Newfoundland after 19 March 1943

- 22d Antisubmarine Squadron: 8 March 1943 – 14 August 1943 (attached 20 November 1942 – 8 March 1943)

Cherry Point MCAS, North Carolina, Bluethenthal Field, North Carolina after 9 April 1943

=== Stations ===
- New York City, New York, 20 November 1942 – 15 October 1943.
