= Dunkeswell Aerodrome =

Airfield in Devon, England

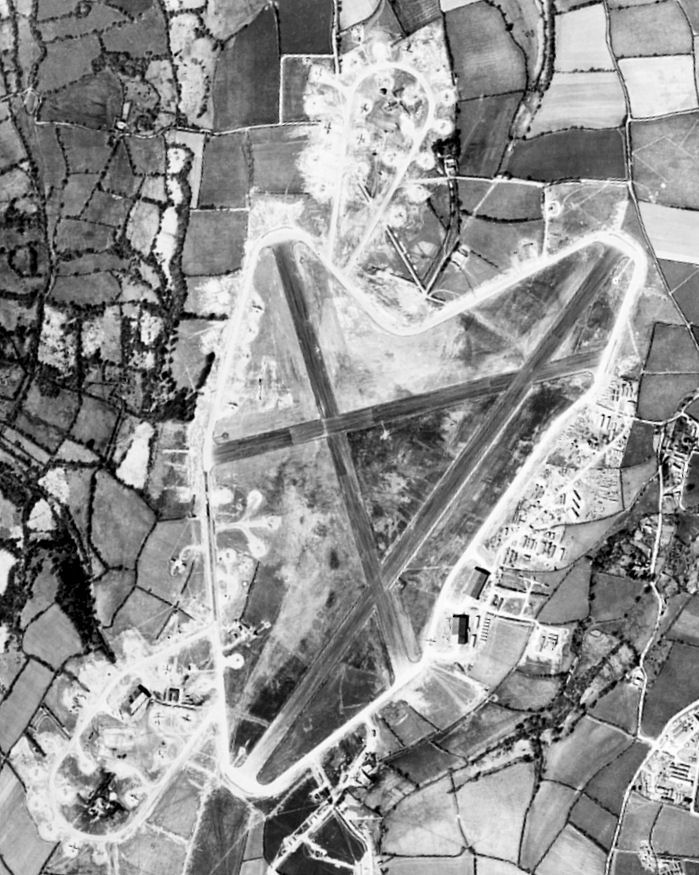
- Aerial photograph of Dunkeswell airfield, 22 April 1944
- IATA: none; ICAO: EGTU

Summary
- Airport type: Private
- Operator: Air Westward Co. Ltd.
- Location: Dunkeswell, Honiton
- In use: 1943-54 (Military)
- Elevation AMSL: 839 ft / 256 m
- Coordinates: 50°51′36″N 003°14′05″W
- Website: www.dunkeswell.co.uk/

Map
- Location in Devon

Runways
Direction	Length		Surface
Direction	m	ft	Surface
04/22	968	3,176	Asphalt
17/35 unlicensed	644	2,113	Asphalt
- Sources: UK AIP at NATS

Dunkeswell Aerodrome (ICAO: EGTU) is an airfield in East Devon, England. It is located next to the village of Dunkeswell near the eastern edge of the Blackdown Hills, approximately 5 miles (8 km) north of the town of Honiton and 16 miles (26 km) northeast of Exeter. It is a busy civilian airfield with a mix of general aviation, flight instruction, skydiving, Spitfire flights, helicopter flights and occasionally wing walking.

Nearby, one mile (1.6 km) to the southwest, is North Hill, a grass airstrip run by Devon and Somerset Gliding Club.

Dunkeswell Aerodrome has a CAA Ordinary Licence (Number P674) that allows flights for the public transport of passengers or for flying instruction as authorised by the licensee (Air Westward Limited). The aerodrome is not licensed for night use.

It offered tandem skydiving opportunities with Sky Dive Buzz until 2025, when the company was placed into compulsory liquidation following the death of two participants whose parachute failed to open.

Dunkeswell Airfield Heritage Centre is situated to one side of the large propeller memorial.

== History ==
Dunkeswell Airfield was built between 1942 and 1943 by George Wimpey and Co, and opened in 1943 during the Second World War, as RAF Dunkeswell. The station was originally planned as a No. 10 Group, RAF Fighter Command, then a No. 19 Group RAF Coastal Command airfield, but was transferred for use by American units.

It was first used by the American United States Army Air Forces Antisubmarine Command, 479th Antisubmarine Group, as a base of operations to fly antisubmarine missions over the Bay of Biscay using specialised Consolidated B-24 Liberator bombers from August until November 1943.

In November, the United States Army Air Forces turned over the antisubmarine mission to the United States Navy and its Liberators were reassigned to Navy Patrol Bomber Squadron VPB-103, Fleet Air Wing 7, which continued aerial antisubmarine operations from the station, the AAF aircraft being redesignated under the USN/USMC system of the time as PB4Y-1 Liberators. This was the first United States Navy unit to train with the RAF, later followed by VB-105 and VB-110. The Naval antisubmarine squadrons moved to RAF Upottery in November 1944.

With the departure of the Americans, the RAF used the airfield from August 1945 to April 1946 for ferrying aircraft to the Middle East by No. 16 Ferry Unit RAF, RAF Transport Command. After September 1946, the station was put on care and maintenance status until the end of 1948, when it was sold by the Ministry of Defence.

The following units were here at some point:

- Relief Landing Ground for No. 9 Flying Training School RAF (July - December 1954)
- No. 11 Ferry Unit RAF (August 1945) became No. 16 FU
- Relief Landing Ground for No. 208 Advanced Flying School RAF (November 1951 - June 1954)
- No. 265 Maintenance Unit RAF (August 1946 - December 1948)
- Sub site for No. 267 Maintenance unit RAF (November 1946 - December 1948)
- No. 2778 Squadron RAF Regiment
- No. 2854 Squadron RAF Regiment

== Incidents ==
On 13 June 2025, a male skydiving instructor and a female participant were killed in a tandem skydiving accident at the airfield.

Another experienced male skydiver died while wingsuit flying at the airfield with a friend on 28 February 2026.

== See also ==
- List of former Royal Air Force stations
