= German submarine U-524 =

German World War II submarine

Coordinates: 30°15′N 18°13′W

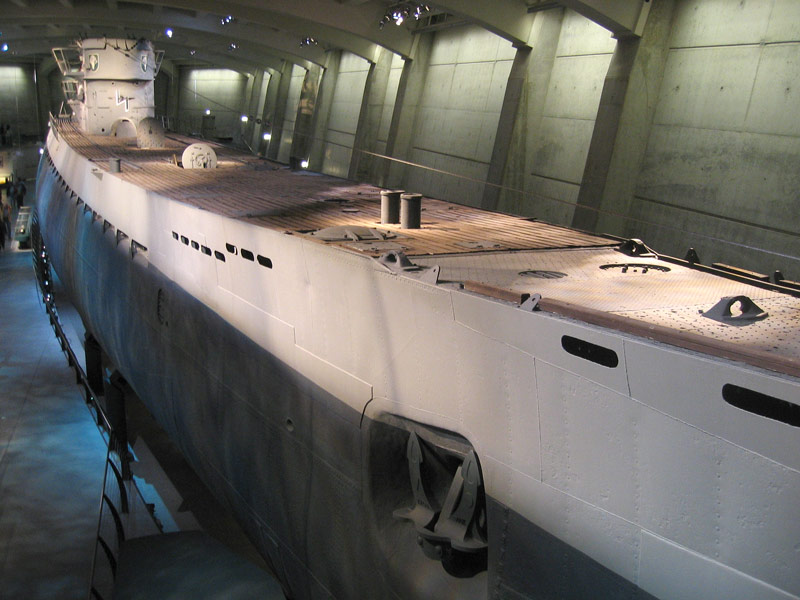
- U-505, a typical Type IXC boat

History

Nazi Germany
- Name: U-524
- Ordered: 14 February 1940
- Builder: Deutsche Werft, Hamburg
- Yard number: 339
- Laid down: 7 August 1941
- Launched: 30 April 1942
- Commissioned: 8 July 1942
- Fate: Sunk on 22 March 1943

General characteristics
- Class & type: Type IXC submarine
- Displacement: 1,120 t (1,100 long tons) surfaced; 1,232 t (1,213 long tons) submerged
- Length: 76.76 m (251 ft 10 in) o/a; 58.75 m (192 ft 9 in) pressure hull
- Beam: 6.76 m (22 ft 2 in) o/a; 4.40 m (14 ft 5 in) pressure hull
- Height: 9.60 m (31 ft 6 in)
- Draught: 4.70 m (15 ft 5 in)
- Installed power: 4,400 PS (3,200 kW; 4,300 bhp) (diesels); 1,000 PS (740 kW; 990 shp) (electric)
- Propulsion: 2 shafts; 2 × diesel engines; 2 × electric motors
- Speed: 18.2 knots (33.7 km/h; 20.9 mph) surfaced; 7.3 knots (13.5 km/h; 8.4 mph) submerged
- Range: 13,450 nmi (24,910 km; 15,480 mi) at 10 knots (19 km/h; 12 mph) surfaced; 64 nmi (119 km; 74 mi) at 4 knots (7.4 km/h; 4.6 mph) submerged
- Test depth: 230 m (750 ft)
- Complement: 4 officers, 44 enlisted
- Armament: 6 × torpedo tubes (4 bow, 2 stern); 22 × 53.3 cm (21 in) torpedoes; 1 × 10.5 cm (4.1 in) SK C/32 deck gun (180 rounds); 1 × 3.7 cm (1.5 in) SK C/30 AA gun; 1 × twin 2 cm FlaK 30 AA guns

Service record
- Part of: 4th U-boat Flotilla; 8 July – 30 November 1942; 10th U-boat Flotilla; 1 December 1942 – 22 March 1943
- Commanders: Kptlt. Walter Freiherr von Steinaecker; 8 July 1942 – 22 March 1943
- Operations: 2 patrols: 1st patrol: 14 November 1942 – 9 January 1943; 2nd patrol: 3 – 22 March 1943
- Victories: 2 merchant ships sunk (16,256 GRT)

German submarine U-524 was a Type IXC U-boat of Nazi Germany's Kriegsmarine during World War II.

She was laid down at the Deutsche Werft (yard) in Hamburg as yard number 339 on 7 August 1941, launched on 30 April 1942 and commissioned on 8 July with Kapitänleutnant Walter Freiherr von Steinaecker in command.

U-524 began her service career with training as part of the 4th U-boat Flotilla from 8 July 1942. She was reassigned to the 10th flotilla for operations on 1 December 1942.

She carried out two patrols and sank two ships. She was a member of three wolfpacks.

She was sunk on 22 March 1943 in south of Madeira by an American aircraft.

== Design and construction ==
German Type IXC submarines were slightly larger than the original Type IXBs. U-524 had a displacement of 1,120 tonnes (1,100 long tons) when at the surface and 1,232 tonnes (1,213 long tons) while submerged. The U-boat had a total length of 76.76 m (251 ft 10 in), a pressure hull length of 58.75 m (192 ft 9 in), a beam of 6.76 m (22 ft 2 in), a height of 9.60 m (31 ft 6 in), and a draught of 4.70 m (15 ft 5 in). The submarine was powered by two MAN M 9 V 40/46 supercharged four-stroke, nine-cylinder diesel engines producing a total of 4,400 metric horsepower (3,240 kW; 4,340 shp) for use while surfaced, two Siemens-Schuckert 2 GU 345/34 double-acting electric motors producing a total of 1,000 shaft horsepower (1,010 PS; 750 kW) for use while submerged. She had two shafts and two 1.92 m (6 ft) propellers. The boat was capable of operating at depths of up to 230 metres (750 ft).

The submarine had a maximum surface speed of 18.3 knots (33.9 km/h; 21.1 mph) and a maximum submerged speed of 7.3 knots (13.5 km/h; 8.4 mph). When submerged, the boat could operate for 63 nautical miles (117 km; 72 mi) at 4 knots (7.4 km/h; 4.6 mph); when surfaced, she could travel 13,450 nautical miles (24,910 km; 15,480 mi) at 10 knots (19 km/h; 12 mph). U-524 was fitted with six 53.3 cm (21 in) torpedo tubes (four fitted at the bow and two at the stern), 22 torpedoes, one 10.5 cm (4.13 in) SK C/32 naval gun, 180 rounds, and a 3.7 cm (1.5 in) SK C/30 as well as a 2 cm (0.79 in) C/30 anti-aircraft gun. The boat had a complement of forty-eight.

U-524 was one of twelve Type IXC submarines ordered from Deutsche Werft on 14 February 1940. The submarine was laid down at Deutsche Werft's Hamburg shipyard on 7 August 1941, as yard number 339. She was launched on 30 April 1942 and commissioned on 8 July 1942.

== Service history ==
On commissioning, U-524 joined the 4th U-boat Flotilla based at Stettin, Prussia (now Szczecin, Poland) for crew training. On completion of training, she joined the operational 10th U-boat Flotilla.

=== First patrol ===
On 10 November 1942, U-542 left Kiel, arriving at Marviken (Kristiansand) in Norway on 12 November 1942, and left there on her first operational patrol on 14 November 1942. She was carrying VHF direction finding gear and a team of specialist operators to help locate convoys by their radio transmissions. The submarine moved through the North Sea, negotiated the gap between Iceland and the Faroe Islands and entered the Atlantic Ocean.

On 29 November 1942, U-524 joined patrol group Panzer. On 4 December, the submarine picked up radio transmissions from a convoy and as a result, Panzer group was ordered to intercept. U-524 made contact with eastbound convoy HX 217 south of Greenland on 7 December, and homed in more U-boats of group Panzer, while a second patrol group, Draufgänger, was ordered to join the attack on the convoy. U-524 attacked the convoy on the night of 7/8 December southeast of Cape Farewell, Greenland, firing nine torpedoes in multiple attacks, sinking the British oil tanker Empire Spenser and near missing the destroyer HMS Fame. Attacks on the convoy continued until 10 December, but despite 22 U-boats being directed against the convoy, a strong defence by the convoy's escort and long-range aircraft from Iceland meant that only one more ship was sunk, Charles L. D., by U-553, while two U-boats were lost, one (U-254) by collision with U-221, and one (U-611 by air attack.

On 13 December 1942, U-524 was ordered to join a new patrol group, Ungestüm, operating south of Iceland. The group was sent against east-bound Convoy HX 218 and westbound Convoy ONS 152, but U-524 had no success, and after operations against ONS 152 were abandoned on 22 December, she headed for her new base in France, arriving at Lorient, on 9 January 1943.

=== Second patrol and loss ===
U-524 left Lorient on her second patrol on 3 March 1943, proceeding to a patrol area south of the Azores. On 13 March, she was ordered to join the new patrol group Unverzagt to be deployed against Convoy UGS 6, en-route from New York to Gibraltar. On 15 March, U-524 attacked the convoy, torpedoing the French freighter Wyoming NNW of the Azores, before being driven off by the destroyer Hobby. U-524 attacked the convoy again on 16 March, but her torpedoes missed their targets. The submarine continued to chase after the convoy until 19 March when U-boat control ordered that operations against the convoy be abandoned, but managed no more attacks against it.

On 22 March 1943, U-524 was spotted on the surface south of Madeira by a USAAF B-24 Liberator called Tidewater Tillie. (Note: Kemp and Wynn state that the B-24 was from the 1st Antisubmarine Squadron, while Blair and Niestlé say it was from the 2d Antisubmarine Squadron.) The B-24 attacked with four depth charges, sinking U-524. While the B-24s crew spotted some of U-524s crew on a raft, none survived to be rescued. Fifty-two men died; there were no survivors.

=== Wolfpacks ===
U-524 took part in three wolfpacks, namely:

- Panzer (23 November – 11 December 1942)
- Ungestüm (11 – 23 December 1942)
- Wohlgemut (12 – 22 March 1943)

== Summary of raiding history ==
| Date | Ship Name | Nationality | Tonnage (GRT) | Fate |
|---|---|---|---|---|
| 8 December 1942 | Empire Spenser | United Kingdom | 8,194 | Sunk |
| 15 March 1943 | Wyoming | Free France | 8,062 | Sunk |

== Bibliography ==
- Blair, Clay (2000). Hitler's U-Boat War: The Hunted 1942–1945. New York: Modern Library. ISBN 0-679-64033-9.
- Busch, Rainer; Röll, Hans-Joachim (1999). German U-boat commanders of World War II : a biographical dictionary. Translated by Brooks, Geoffrey. London, Annapolis, Md: Greenhill Books, Naval Institute Press. ISBN 1-55750-186-6.
- Busch, Rainer; Röll, Hans-Joachim (1999). Deutsche U-Boot-Verluste von September 1939 bis Mai 1945 [German U-boat losses from September 1939 to May 1945]. Der U-Boot-Krieg (in German). Vol. IV. Hamburg, Berlin, Bonn: Mittler. ISBN 3-8132-0514-2.
- Gröner, Erich; Jung, Dieter; Maass, Martin (1991). U-boats and Mine Warfare Vessels. German Warships 1815–1945. Vol. 2. Translated by Thomas, Keith; Magowan, Rachel. London: Conway Maritime Press. ISBN 0-85177-593-4.
- Kemp, Paul (1999). U-Boats Destroyed - German Submarine Losses in the World Wars. London: Arms & Armour. ISBN 1-85409-515-3.
- Niestlé, Axel (2014). German U-Boat Losses During World War II: Details of Destruction. Barnsley, UK: Frontline Books. ISBN 978-1-84832-210-3.
- Wynn, Kenneth (1998). U-Boat Operations of the Second World War: Volume 2: Career Histories, U511–UIT25. London: Chatham Publishing. ISBN 1-86176-069-8.
