= VPB-110 =

Patrol Bombing Squadron 110
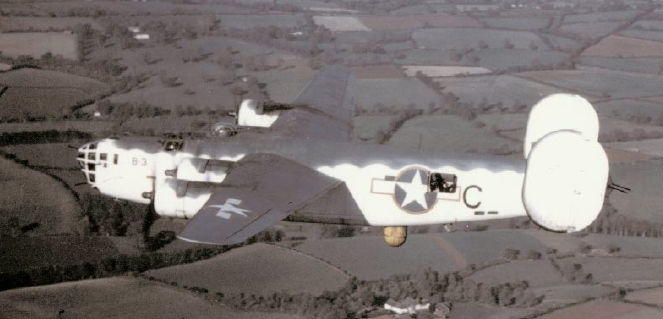
- VB-110 PB4Y-1 in 1943
- Active: 18 July 1943 – 1 September 1945
- Country: United States of America
- Branch: United States Navy
- Type: squadron
- Role: Maritime patrol
- Engagements: World War II

Aircraft flown
- Patrol: PB4Y-1

VPB-110 was a Patrol Bombing Squadron of the U.S. Navy. The squadron was established as Bombing Squadron 110 (VB-110) on 18 July 1943, redesignated Patrol Bombing Squadron 110 (VPB-110) on 1 October 1944 and disestablished on 1 September 1945.

== Operational history ==
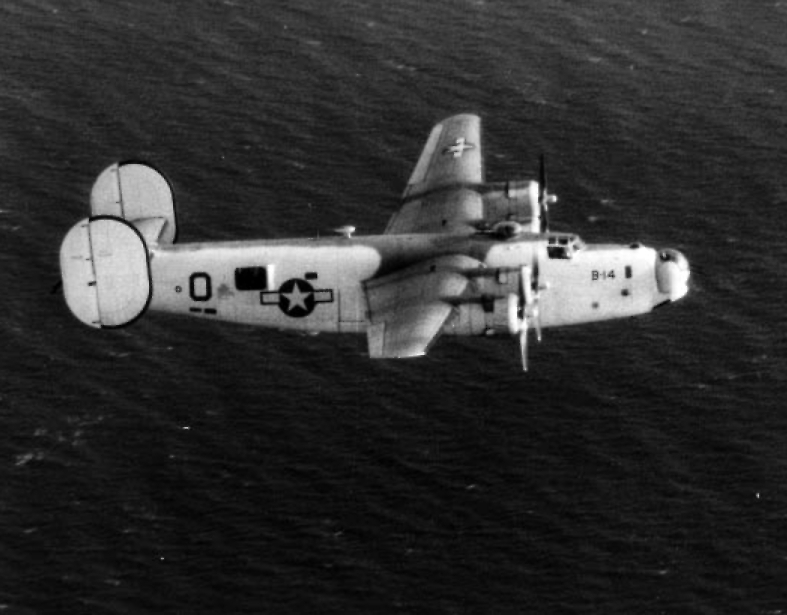
VPB-110 PB4Y-1 over the Atlantic in 1944

- 18 July – 9 September 1943: VB-110 was established at NAS Norfolk, Virginia, as a heavy bombing squadron flying the PB4Y-1 Liberator under the operational control of FAW-5. Most of the flight crews came from VP-203 and other PBM squadrons and required a thorough checkout in the Liberator aircraft. These check flights were completed at NAS Norfolk by 27 July. VB-110 moved from NAS Norfolk to NAAS Elizabeth City, North Carolina, on 1 August for its shakedown phase of training. On 4 August, the training was briefly interrupted while the squadron's aircraft were flown to NAS San Diego to have the new Erco nose turrets installed. At the end of the month, these aircraft were turned over to VB-105, because they were scheduled to depart for England on 1 September. VB-110's replacement aircraft were six Army B-24s with no radar or Erco nose turrets. Three of the modified PB4Y-1 aircraft were received on 9 September, equipped with APS-15 radar, LORAN, Sonobuoys and provisions to carry the Mark 24 homing torpedo.
- 15 September – 20 October 1943: VB-110 departed for RAF St. Eval, Cornwall, England, becoming operational with 12 aircraft aboard on 15 October 1943. Ground personnel and support staff departed aboard the tender USS Albemarle. The squadron joined VB-103 and 105 at this station, under the joint operational control of FAW-7 and 19 Group, RAF Coastal Command. The squadron flew its first mission in the Bay of Biscay on 20 October 1943. VB-110 was one of 20 squadrons, American and British, operating under the 19 Group, Coastal Command. Flights over the Bay of Biscay were called Barrier Patrols, running from Fastnet Rock in southern Ireland to Cape Finisterre, Spain, and back to Brest and Land's End. German Fw 190 fighters from Brest or Bordeaux and Ju 88 interceptors from various French bases posed the greatest danger to the squadrons. These German aircraft were specifically assigned the mission of hunting for the Allied Anti-submarine warfare (ASW) aircraft that endangered the German U-boats.
- 30 October 1943: The 19th USAAF squadron departed RAF Dunkeswell, Devon, England to join the 8th Air Force, followed by the 22nd USAAF on 28 September. Three Navy patrol squadrons (VBs 103, 110 and 105) were assigned the ASW role previously flown by the Army Air Force in England. The USAAF squadrons were phased out and their equipment, similar to that on the VB-110 aircraft, was turned over to the Navy. The USAAF flew its last ASW mission from RAF Dunkeswell on 31 October 1943 and the 4th USAAF squadron departed on 6 November. VB-110 moved aboard RAF Dunkeswell on 30 October 1943. The three squadrons at RAF Dunkeswell came to be known by several names over the next year: Dunkeswell Air Group, Land Plane Air Group and finally to Patrol Air Group One. Each squadron had the luxury of being assigned its own PATSU.
- 8 November 1943: Lieutenant W. E. Grumbles and crew failed to return from a mission over the Bay of Biscay. A message intercepted by another aircraft indicated that the crew was under attack, followed a while later by an SOS. Nothing further was ever learned about this crew and they were listed as missing in action. The next day, Lieutenant Joseph P. Kennedy Jr. and his crew were attacked by a pair of Me 210 aircraft but escaped into the clouds. The Germans were aware of the three Navy bombing squadrons and the threat they posed to the U-boats. When submarines were going out, special Me-210 and Ju 88 interceptor squadrons based in France would scour the skies ahead searching for the Navy patrol bombers.
- 10 November 1943: VB-110 was a participant in one of the longest surface battles of aircraft against a U-boat in WWII. At 08:00, a VB-105 aircraft piloted by Lieutenant L. E. Harmon was alerted by an RAF aircraft of a radar contact near the coast of Spain. Harmon located the surfaced U-966 and made two strafing attacks. Heavy anti-aircraft (AA) fire damaged his aircraft and forced him to break off the attack. An RAF fighter then dove to attack the submarine. Harmon made a third strafing attack but had to break off afterwards due to a fuel shortage. Lieutenant K. L. Wright, of VB-103, located U-966 near Ferrol at 10:40 and delivered a strafing and depth charge attack. Intense AA fire drove him off and he had to depart the target due to low fuel. Lieutenant W. W. Parish and crew from VB-110 then arrived on the scene. A Depth charge attack was conducted in cooperation with a rocket-firing RAF Liberator at 12:30. The submarine was abandoned by its crew after running aground at Oritiguiera, Spain. The German crewmen were quickly picked up by nearby Spanish fishing vessels.
- 24–28 December 1943: A flotilla of 12 German destroyers attempted to provide cover for a blockade runner, Alstereufer. Several missions were run against the enemy ships over a period of five days. The blockade runner was sunk on 27 December by a Czech squadron, leaving the destroyers fleeing for port. The enemy lost three destroyers to British surface units but in the action shot up several squadron aircraft. While returning to base on 28 December after looking for targets, Lieutenant Commander Reedy encountered four He 177 aircraft. In the resultant melee, Reedy's crew managed to damage one of the enemy, sending it back towards France trailing smoke from a fire in its starboard engine. Postwar examination of German records indicated that He 177A3 Werk No. 5557 from 11/KG40, flown by Hauptman B. Eidhoff, was unable to return to base and crashed into the sea. Eidhoff and his crew of 5 were subsequently reported missing by the Luftwaffe. On the same mission, Lieutenant Parrish and his crew were killed when their aircraft crashed into high ground near Okehampton, Devon.
- 26 February 1944: Lieutenant J. L. Williams crashed into Great Skellig Rock off the coast of Ireland and the aircraft fell into the sea. All hands were lost.
- 12 March 1944: Lieutenant (jg) W. H. Ryan and crew became lost during foul weather conditions and failed to establish a fix from the H/F and D/F stations. Subsequent searches found nothing and the crew was listed as missing in action.
- 23 March 1944: RAF Dunkeswell came under Navy control. The facilities under the RAF had been extremely spartan but with the change of Dunkeswell to a Naval Air Facility, conditions improved dramatically.
- 27 March 1944: Lieutenant (jg) R. B. Meihaus was preparing to land in very poor visibility and with only three engines after completing a mission near the Spanish coast. He hit telephone wires and a house on his approach, knocking out two more engines. He continued his landing approach for another 2.5 miles (4.0 km) on one engine, making a successful crash landing on the field with no injuries to any of his crew.
- 31 March 1944: Two squadron aircraft were attacked by German fighter interceptors within 30 minutes of each other in the same position in the Bay of Biscay. Lieutenant H. Barton and crew and Lieutenant (jg) O. R. Moore and crew were all listed as missing in action. Within the first six months of their arrival in England, VB-110 had lost one-third of its flight crews and one half of its aircraft complement to a combination of enemy action and weather.
- 6 June 1944: During the Invasion of Normandy the squadron provided patrols over the southern entrance to the channel to prevent U-boats from approaching the invasion fleet. Aircraft patrolled the area at 30-minute intervals. The squadron flew 420 operational sorties during the months of June through August 1944. During patrols several small surface vessels were sunk, with only minimal damage from return gunfire. Eight attacks were made on suspected submarine targets with negative results, including one of which a very clear picture was taken of a schnorkel and periscope. It was anticipated that the three Navy patrol squadrons might have several losses from enemy fighter interceptors during the Normandy coverage, but in fact very few enemy aircraft were sighted during the three-month period.
- 12 August 1944: Lieutenant Joseph P. Kennedy volunteered for Operation Aphrodite to serve as pilot aboard a worn-out PB4Y-1 loaded with explosives and equipped with terminal radio control systems. The concept was that the pilot and copilot would take off in the aircraft and place it on the correct heading toward the target. Once locked under positive radio control by an accompanying mothership, the pilot and copilot would bail out of the aircraft. The explosive-laden bomber would then be guided into its target by the accompanying plane. The target for this mission was one of the V-1 flying bomb launching sites on the mainland. Halfway to the target the aircraft exploded, killing both Kennedy and his copilot. For his bravery in volunteering for such a dangerous mission, Lieutenant Kennedy was posthumously awarded the Navy Cross.
- 24 August 1944: Lieutenant (jg) J. G. Byrnes and crew were killed while on a routine night familiarization training flight after crashing into high ground near Brecon, South Wales.
- 24 December 1944: Submarine activity since the invasion of Normandy and capture of the submarine pens at Brest had decreased significantly. Lieutenant F. M. Nunnally and his crew obtained a positive sonobuoy contact near the harbor of Alderney Island but were driven off by the harbor AA defenses before being able to make an attack.
- 10 January 1945: VPB-110 initiated its first searchlight patrols. The searchlights, or Leigh lights, named after their British inventor, had been used with some success by the RAF. By March, one patrol with a searchlight-equipped aircraft was being made each night. Only six of the crews had received training with this equipment.
- 14 January 1945: Lieutenant Ralph D. Spalding Jr. and crew were killed in a crash near Igoudar Mnabha while en route to Dakar for detached duty.
- 9 May 1945: With the surrender of Germany, the U-boats at sea also began to surrender. Lieutenant F. L. Schaum and crew sighted and accepted the surrender of the first enemy U-boat to give up to the Allies. A second U-boat surrendered on 13 May. Both submarines were escorted to the nearest port in the United Kingdom.
- 1 June 1945: VPB-110 received orders to report to NAS Norfolk. Squadron aircraft were turned over to HEDRON-7 at NAF Dunkeswell as the squadron departed for the U.S. aboard the tender USS Albemarle on 4 June and arrived at Norfolk on 14 June 1945.
- 25 June 1945: VPB-110 was detached from NAS Norfolk and FAW-5 and ordered to report to NAS Seattle, Washington, under the operational control of FAW-6, with a 30-day delay in reporting.
- 1 September 1945: The squadron had been scheduled for reforming at NAS Seattle, as a PB4Y-2 Privateer squadron on 15 September. The cessation of hostilities and subsequent Surrender of Japan ended the necessity for the continued existence of large numbers of Navy patrol squadrons. VPB-110 personnel were given new orders for either demobilization or extension of duty, and on 1 September 1945 the squadron was disestablished at NAS Seattle.

== Aircraft assignments ==
The squadron was assigned the following aircraft, effective on the dates shown:

- PB4Y-1 - 18 July 1943

== Home port assignments ==
The squadron was assigned to these home ports, effective on the dates shown:

- NAS Norfolk, Virginia - 18 Jul 1943
- NAAS Elizabeth City, North Carolina - 1 August 1943
- RAF St. Eval, England - 15 September 1943
- RAF Dunkeswell, England - 30 October 1943
- NAS Norfolk - 14 June 1945
- NAS Seattle, Washington - 25 June 1945

== See also ==
- Maritime patrol aircraft
- List of inactive United States Navy aircraft squadrons
- List of United States Navy aircraft squadrons
- List of squadrons in the Dictionary of American Naval Aviation Squadrons
- History of the United States Navy
