= VPB-105 =

Patrol Bombing Squadron 105
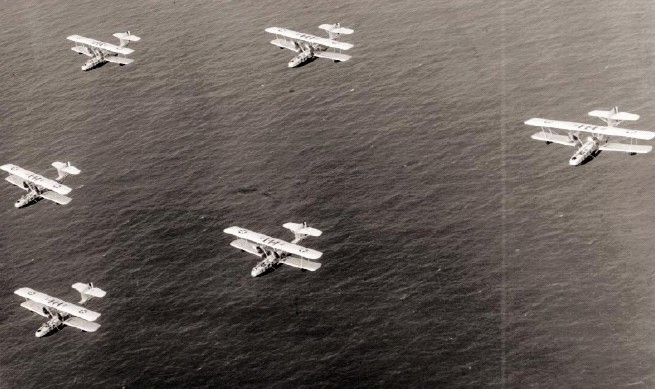
- VP-2D15 PD-1s in 1930
- Active: 29 May 1924 – 27 June 1945
- Country: United States of America
- Branch: United States Navy
- Type: squadron
- Role: Maritime patrol
- Nickname(s): Patrolmen
- Engagements: World War II

Aircraft flown
- Patrol: F-5L; H-16; HS-2L; T3M-2; SC-2; O2U-1; PD-1/PM-1/PM-2; PBY-2/5/5A; PB4Y-1

VPB-105 was a Patrol Bombing Squadron of the U.S. Navy. The squadron was established as Patrol Squadron 10 (VP-10) on 29 May 1924, redesignated Patrol Squadron 2D-15 (VP-2D15) on 21 September 1927, redesignated Patrol Squadron 2-S (VP-2S) on 1 July 1931, redesignated Patrol Squadron 2-F (VP-2F) on 17 July 1933, redesignated Patrol Squadron 2 (VP-2) on 1 October 1937, redesignated Patrol Squadron 31 (VP-31) on 1 July 1939, redesignated Bombing Squadron 105 (VB-105) on 15 May 1943, redesignated Patrol Bombing Squadron 105 (VPB-105) on 1 October 1944 and disestablished on 27 June 1945.

== Operational history ==
- 29 May 1924: Station aircraft supporting the Naval Base at Coco Solo, Panama Canal Zone, were designated by CNO as VP-10. The squadron consisted of six flying boats (F-5Ls and H-16s). The new designation placed the squadron under the Naval Coast Defense Forces, Panama Canal Zone Region.
- 20 May 1925: VP-10 received new HS-2L flying boats to replace the World War I vintage F-5L and H-16s. The new equipment was tested in formation bombing on targets off the entrance to Colón, Panama, achieving "excellent patterns."
- 29 September 1925: VP-10 tested new radio equipment in areas of the Gulf of San Blas considered transmission dead spots.
- 1 Feb 1926: Two aircraft from VP-10 participated with Army aircraft in the Joint Army/Navy Problem No. I.
- 21 September 1927: VP-10 was redesignated VP-2D15, the D15 represented the 15th Naval District, Panama Canal Zone.
- 8 January 1928: Two T3M-2s and one SC-2 of VP-2D15 were converted to land gear-capable aircraft to provide an escort for Colonel Charles Lindbergh from the Gulf of Chiriquí, to the Canal Zone during his visit to the area.
- 13 May 1928: Two new O2U-1 seaplanes arrived aboard SS Cristobal and were assembled on station. The aircraft were used to make several flights to Haiti to transport vaccine and medical supplies for the Public Health Service in connection with an outbreak of meningitis.
- 3 January 1931: VP-2D15 received the first PM-1. Night flight training was conducted with the plane and squadron crew members praised the handling and ease of night landings in the new aircraft.
- 3 Apr 1931: Elements of VP-2D15 participated in Fleet Problem XII with Carrier Division One, with VP-8S and VP-10S held off the coast of Guantanamo Bay, Cuba. VP-2D15 aircraft operated from the naval base, while VP-8S was supported by USS Wright and VP-10S had support from USS Swann and USS Whitney. The squadron's 700 miles (1,100 km) return flight to Coco Solo, took 8 hours and 5 minutes.
- 1 July 1931: VP-2D15 was redesignated VP-2S, with the S representing the Scouting Fleet.
- 13 September 1931: VP-2S completed transition to new PM-2s after receiving a consignment of 20 aircraft from NAS Hampton Roads. The new seaplanes were flown to Coco Solo by squadron personnel, rather than shipping them and reassembling on station, saving the government approximately $250,000.
- 1 February 1932: VPs 2S and 5S were transferred temporarily from the Panama Canal Zone Region to Base Force command, with headquarters at NAS San Diego, California.
- 1 April 1933: VP-2S was redesignated VP-2F, with the F representing the Base Force. A detachment of nine aircraft operated with USS Wright, with the remainder of the squadron based at NAS San Diego.
- 7 April 1933: VPs 2F and 5F returned to the Panama Canal Zone and its former base at FAB Coco Solo.
- 21 April–28 May 1934: VPs 2F, 3F, 5F, 7F and 9F assembled at FAB Coco Solo to conduct a test flight of massed squadrons in support of fleet movements. Exercises extended through 28 May 1934, terminating at NAS San Diego.
- 1 January – 16 February 1935: VP-2F conducted exercises with VPs 3F and 5F in the Caribbean to evaluate support provided by tenders USS Wright, USS Lapwing, USS Teal and USS Gannet. Upon completion of the exercises on 16 February 1935 the squadron had covered approximately 4,000 miles (6,400 km) and crossed the Caribbean for the third time in one year.
- 1 October 1937: VP-2F was redesignated VP-2 when the fleet structure was reorganized and Patrol Wings were established. VPs 2, 3 and 5 at FAB Coco Solo came under the control of PatWing-3.
- 20 February 1939: VPs 2, 3 and 5 participated in Fleet Problem XX, with PatWing-3 aircraft serving under Black Force. Exercises against ships and aircraft of White Force in the Caribbean pointed out the extreme vulnerability of patrol aircraft to attack while at land bases, as compared to relative safety in dispersion using tender support. Results also indicated unacceptable loss rates of the slow-moving patrol aircraft in operations against antiaircraft (AA) fire from ships.
- 14 April 1939: VPs 2, 3 and 5 conducted photographic mapping of 1,076 miles (1,732 km) of South American coastline from Nicaragua to the Colombian border. The aerial photography was greatly impeded by bad weather conditions.
- 9 March – 1 April 1940: VP-31 was assigned to Neutrality Patrols, operating in conjunction with VP-53 out of NAS Key West, Florida. VP-31 returned to PatWing-3 operational control on 1 April 1940.
- 1 May 1940: A three-plane detachment from VP-31 was sent to NAS Key West; three aircraft were sent to NAS San Juan, Puerto Rico; and a four-plane detachment remained at Coco Solo.
- 8 July 1941: VP-31 pilots flew all of the squadron aircraft to NAS San Diego, for refitting with the newer PBY-5.
- 1 December 1941: Detachments of aircraft were maintained at NAS Guantanamo, Antigua, Grand Exuma, St. Lucia, British Guiana and Trinidad.
- 26 May 1942: Lieutenant Edward G. Binning, operating from NAS St. Lucia, located a submarine on the surface at 23:57 and dropped three depth charges on it in two diving attacks. The submarine appeared to settle slowly in the water in a sinking condition. USS Tarbell was called to the scene and was also of the opinion that the submarine had been sunk. This attack deserved special notice because it was the first night attack carried out successfully in that area. Lieutenant Binning was subsequently awarded the Navy Cross for this action. Postwar examination of German Navy records, however, did not record any loss of a U-boat on that date.
- 15 August 1942: VP-31 operated out of NAS San Juan and changed administrative control from PatWing-3, Panama Canal Zone, to PatWing-11.
- 1 October 1942: A VP-31 detachment was sent to NAS Quonset Point, Rhode Island, to serve with the Narraganset Air Patrol off the northeastern United States. The remainder of the squadron arrived at NAS Elizabeth City, North Carolina, for training in operation of the new PBY-5A.
- 1 January 1943: A VP-31 detachment was sent to NAS Argentia, Newfoundland, serving under FAW-7's operational control.
- 1 February 1943: VP-31 detachments were maintained at NAS Argentia, Newfoundland, on Anti-submarine warfare (ASW) patrols; MCAS Cherry Point, North Carolina; and NAS Jacksonville, Florida.
- 1 April 1943: VP-31 detachments rejoin the squadron at NAS Norfolk, Virginia, for refitting and familiarization training on the new PB4Y-1 Liberator land-based long-range bombers.
- 15 May 1943: VP-31 was redesignated VB-105 in preparation for its transition from patrol flying boats (VP) to land-based bombers (VB). Fifty percent of the squadron's assets, flight crews and ground support staff were supplemented by VP-52. During the four months of training detachments were sent to Kindley Field, Bermuda, for operational long-range training flights.
- 1 August 1943: VB-105 aircraft were ferried by squadron aircrews to RAF St. Eval, Cornwall, England. The squadron, while nominally under the control of FAW-7, came under the operational control of 19 Group, RAF Coastal Command.
- 24 September 1943: The 19th USAAF squadron departed RAF Dunkeswell, England, to join the 8th Air Force, followed by the 22nd USAAF on 28 September. Three Navy patrol squadrons (VBs 103, 110 and 105) took over the ASW role previously assigned to the USAAF in England. The USAAF ASW squadrons were phased out and their equipment, similar to that on VB-105 aircraft, was turned over to the Navy. The USAAF flew its last ASW mission from Dunkeswell on 31 October 1943 and the 4th USAAF squadron departed on 6 November.
- 12 October 1943: VB-105 relocated to RAF Dunkeswell. Within a few months of the squadron's arrival, control of a portion of the airbase was turned over to the Navy and designated NAF Dunkeswell. Principal duties of the squadron were convoy escort and ASW patrols.
- 10 November 1943: VB-105 was a participant in one of the longest surface battles of aircraft against a U-boat in World War II. At 08:00, a VB-105 aircraft piloted by Lieutenant L. E. Harmon, was alerted by an RAF aircraft of a radar contact near the coast of Spain. Harmon located the surfaced U-966 and made two strafing attacks. Heavy AA fire damaged his aircraft and forced him to break off the attack. An RAF fighter then dove to attack the submarine. Harmon made a third strafing attack but had to break off afterwards due to a fuel shortage. Lieutenant K. L. Wright, of VB-103, located U-966 near Ferrol at 10:40 and delivered a strafing and depth charge attack. Intense AA fire drove him off and he had to depart the target due to lack of fuel. Lieutenant W. W. Parish and crew then arrived on the scene. A depth charge attack was conducted in cooperation with a rocket-firing RAF Liberator at 12:30. The submarine was abandoned by its crew after running aground at Oritiguiera, Spain, with eight of its crew of 49 killed in action. The German crewmen were quickly picked up by nearby Spanish fishing vessels and interned by the Spanish government.
- 26 February 1944: One of the squadron aircraft was attacked by German Ju 88s and shot down, with the loss of all hands. A Ju 88C-6 Werk No. 750941 from 3/ZG1 piloted by Lieutenant H. Baldeweg was also shot down, with the loss of its crew.
- 1 June 1944: VB-105 participated in operations in support of the Invasion of Normandy, maintaining 15 aircraft in an operational status for the duration of the landings.
- 10 August 1944: A squadron aircraft encountered a heavily armed German Do 217. In the ensuing combat, the German aircraft was heavily damaged and turned for home.
- 30 August 1944: A squadron aircraft attacked a German U-boat in coastal waters off Brest. Sufficient evidence of the submarine's destruction was present to justify a claim of sunk by the squadron, however postwar German records indicate no U-boat losses on this date.
- 17 May 1945: Operational missions were reduced and sight-seeing tours for VIPs were conducted over the captured territories ranging from Normandy to Holland.
- 4 June 1945: VPB-105 was en route from England to continental United States to prepare for its disestablishment.
- 27 June 1945: VPB-105 was disestablished at NAS Norfolk.

== Aircraft assignments ==
The squadron was assigned the following aircraft, effective on the dates shown:

- F-5L - May 1924
- H-16 - May 1924
- HS-2L - May 1925
- T3M-2 - 1927
- SC-2 - 1927
- O2U-1 - May 1928
- PD-1 - 1930
- PM-1 - July 1931
- PM-1/PM-2 September 1931
- PBY-2 - 1939
- PBY-5 - July 1941
- PBY-5A - September 1942
- PB4Y-1 - April 1943

== Home port assignments ==
The squadron was assigned to these home ports, effective on the dates shown:

- NAS Coco Solo, Panama - 29 May 1924
- NAS San Diego, California - 1 February 1932
- FAB Coco Solo - 7 April 1933
- NAS San Juan, Puerto Rico - 15 August 1941
- NAS Elizabeth City, North Carolina - 1 October 1942
- NAS Norfolk, Virginia - 1 April 1943
- RAF St. Eval, England - 1 August 1943
- RAF/NAF Dunkeswell, England - 12 October 1943
- NAS Norfolk - June 1945

== See also ==
- Maritime patrol aircraft
- List of inactive United States Navy aircraft squadrons
- List of United States Navy aircraft squadrons
- List of squadrons in the Dictionary of American Naval Aviation Squadrons
- History of the United States Navy
