= VPB-103 =

Patrol Bombing Squadron 103
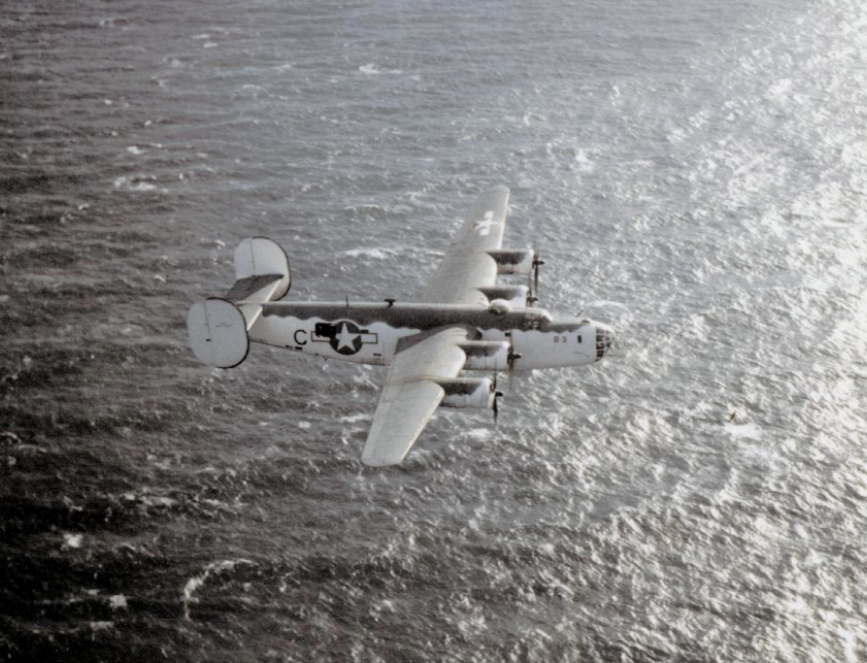
- VB-103 PB4Y-1 off the English coast in 1943
- Active: 15 March 1943 – 31 August 1945
- Country: United States of America
- Branch: United States Navy
- Type: squadron
- Role: Maritime patrol
- Engagements: World War II

Aircraft flown
- Patrol: PB4Y-1 Liberator; PB4Y-2 Privateer

VPB-103 was a Patrol Bombing Squadron of the U.S. Navy. The squadron was established as Bombing Squadron 103 (VB-103) on 15 March 1943, redesignated as Patrol Bombing Squadron 103 (VPB-103) on 1 October 1944 and disestablished on 31 August 1945.

== Operational history ==
- 15 March – 24 April 1943: VB-103 was established at NAAS Camp Kearney, California, under the operational control of FAW-14. The squadron was designated as a heavy bombing squadron flying the PB4Y-1 Liberator. Most of the squadron's officers and enlisted personnel had been drawn from VP-23, a PBY-5A Catalina patrol squadron which had recently returned from the South Pacific. The squadron's ground school and basic flight training was conducted at NAAS Camp Kearney through the end of April and was rushed due to the critical nature of the U-boat threat in the North Atlantic. On 24 April, three officers and 126 ground support personnel departed San Diego, California, by train for NAS Norfolk, Virginia. The flight crews departed NAAS Camp Kearney on 29 April.
- 29 April – 14 May 1943: Upon arrival at Norfolk, the squadron was told that a change had been made. The two weeks of Anti-submarine warfare (ASW) training planned there had been cancelled and VB-103 was to proceed to NAS Quonset Point, Rhode Island. The ground staff boarded another train for New Jersey. Upon arrival of the first element on 30 April, the squadron was placed under the operational control of FAW-9. The last of the squadron's personnel did not arrive at NAS Quonset Point until 14 May 1943. Installation of secret new ASW gear began with the arrival of the first aircraft on 30 April. VB-103 was the first Navy patrol squadron to be equipped with APS-15 radar, LORAN, Sonobuoys and provisions to carry the Mark 24 Fido Homing Torpedo.
- 15 May 1943: When the last stragglers arrived at NAS Quonset Point, orders were received to proceed to NAS Argentia, Newfoundland. Ground staff boarded the tender USS Barnegat and flight crews flew directly to Newfoundland. After only a day of orientation at NAS Argentia, flight crews were put on patrols over the North Atlantic convoy routes, under the operational control of FAW-7. By the time the squadron came into full operation, the U-boats had pulled out of the area.
- 24 June 1943: Lieutenant Reese and crew disappeared while on convoy patrol 700 miles (1,100 km) northeast of Argentia. Reese had reported a radar blip and came through a very heavy overcast to investigate. No further messages were received. On the next day in clear weather, three huge icebergs were seen in the area. The squadron learned from this incident that when investigating an isolated radar blip in bad weather, always allow a five-degree offset on the radar scope until a visual contact is obtained.
- 7 August 1943: Lieutenant (jg) Henry and crew crashed into the sea from unknown causes while on a training mission with a Canadian submarine in Placentia Bay. All hands (11) perished.
- 12–15 August 1943: Squadron aircraft conducted an attack on a submarine on this date with negative results. This was the only attack on a submarine conducted by the squadron on the western periphery of the Atlantic. It was presumed the CVEs that were escorting convoys were having so much success against the U-boats that it may have caused them to change their hunting grounds. ASW searches and convoy patrols remained the primary missions until 15 August when the squadron received orders to proceed to RAF St. Eval, England.
- 17 August 1943: VB-103 became operational at RAF St. Eval. Special training was given in ASW techniques for patrols over the Bay of Biscay. Upon completion of training at the end of the month the squadron was moved to RAF Dunkeswell in Devonshire, England.
- 2 September 1943: Lieutenant Wickstrom and crew failed to return to base. It was believed the aircraft fell victim to specially equipped Ju 88 long-range heavy fighters of KG 40 tasked with shooting down Allied ASW aircraft.
- 4–18 September 1943: Lieutenant (jg) Alexander and crew were conducting an antisubmarine patrol over the Bay of Biscay when they were forced to ditch their flaming PB4Y-1 after an attack by six Ju 88s. One enemy aircraft was shot down during the combat and another damaged. Alexander and his crew safely exited the sinking bomber and reached the English shore in a life raft 36 hours later. Lieutenant (jg) Alexander was later awarded the Navy Cross for his action. The enemy fighter shot down by Alexander's crew was a Ju 88C-6 Werk No. 360382 from 13/KG40 flown by Leutnant G. Blankenberg. Leutnant Blankenberg and his two crewmen were subsequently listed as missing by the Luftwaffe. Two other RAF bombers out of Dunkeswell, were also shot down that same day. Another VB-103 crew was attacked on 16 September without casualties, and a fourth on 18 September, also without any damage or loss of personnel.
- 24 September – 6 November 1943: The 19th USAAF squadron departed Dunkeswell to join the 8th Air Force, followed by the 22nd USAAF on 28 September. Three Navy patrol squadrons (VBs 103, 110 and 105) took over the ASW role previously assumed by the USAAF in England. The USAAF squadrons were phased out and their equipment, similar to that on the VB-103 aircraft, was turned over to the Navy. The USAAF flew its last ASW mission from Dunkeswell on 31 October 1943, and the 4th USAAF squadron departed on 6 November.
- 10 November 1943: VB-103 was a participant in one of the longest surface battles of aircraft against a U-boat in World War II. At 08:00, a VB-105 aircraft piloted by Lieutenant L. E. Harmon, was alerted by an RAF aircraft of a radar contact near the coast of Spain. Harmon located the surfaced U-966, and made two strafing attacks. Heavy anti-aircraft (AA) fire damaged his aircraft and forced him to break off the attack. An RAF fighter then dove to attack the submarine. Harmon made a third strafing attack but had to break off afterwards due to a fuel shortage. Lieutenant K. L. Wright, of VB-103, located U-966 near Ferrol at 10:40, and delivered a strafing and depth charge attack. Intense AA fire drove him off and he too had to depart the target for lack of fuel. Lieutenant W. W. Parish and crew then arrived on the scene. A depth charge attack was conducted in cooperation with a rocket-firing RAF Liberator at 12:30. The submarine was abandoned by its crew after running aground at Oritiguiera, Spain. The German crewmen were quickly picked up by nearby Spanish fishing vessels.
- 12 November 1943: Lieutenant (jg) Brownell made a night attack on a submarine. His aircraft was apparently heavily damaged by the U-boat's AA fire and crashed into the sea with the loss of all hands. The next day two oil slicks were spotted about 5 miles (8.0 km) apart. Postwar examination of German records indicate that he sank U-508.
- 3 December 1943: Worsening weather conditions made flying and patrol activities very dangerous. On this date, Lieutenant Lucas and his crew were killed when their aircraft crashed into a high ridge while flying on instruments on a training flight.
- 24 December 1943: A flotilla of German destroyers attempted to provide cover for a blockade runner, Alsterufer. Several missions were run against the enemy ships over a period of five days. The blockade-runner was sunk on 27 December by a Czech squadron, leaving the destroyers fleeing for port. The enemy lost three destroyers to British surface units, but in the action shot up several squadron aircraft. Ensign Anderson and his crew were hit on a strafing run and had to bail out over Spain where they were interned for several months before returning to England.
- 1 January 1944: VB-103 came under the operational control of 19 Group RAF Coastal Command.
- 28 January 1944: Lieutenant Enloe and crew caught a U-boat on the surface, dropping six depth charges. The submarine quickly settled by the stern and slid beneath the surface. Postwar examination of records indicate that the submarine was U-271.
- 14 February 1944: Lieutenant (jg) Wright and crew were attacked while on patrol over the Bay of Biscay by two Ju 88s. During the attack Wright's crew managed to shoot down one of their attackers, a Ju 88C-6 Werk No. 750967, flown by Oberleutnant K. Necesany of Stab 1/ZG1. Oberleutnant Necesany and his two crewmen were subsequently listed as missing by the Luftwaffe. Wright managed to escape into the cloud cover with one engine out. During the attempt to return to base another engine cut out and the crew was forced to ditch the aircraft. Only one crew member failed to exit the plane before it sank. One other crewman died in the life raft from internal injuries before the remaining eight crew members were picked up the next day.
- 20 March 1944: Lieutenant (jg) Kessel and crew crashed at sea from unknown causes while returning from an operational mission. All hands were lost.
- 23 March 1944: RAF Dunkeswell came under Navy control. The facilities under the RAF had been extremely spartan. With the change of Dunkeswell to a Naval Air Facility, conditions improved dramatically. A PATSU took over maintenance for the squadron.
- 6 Jun 1944: During the Normandy invasion the squadron provided patrols over the southern entrance to the English Channel to prevent U-boats from approaching the invasion fleet. Aircraft patrolled the area at 30-minute intervals. VB-103 conducted seven sorties a day during the operation. There were no encounters with enemy fighters but on 8 June Lieutenant Anderson exchanged gunfire with an Fw 200 Condor.
- July–December 1944: The capture of French ports used for submarine bases greatly curtailed the activities of the German U-boat fleet. The use of the schnorkel by the German U-boats made intercepts more dependent on the use of radar. Although 16 sonobuoys were dropped on radar contacts in the months of October to December 1944, the results were negative.
- 11 March 1945: Lieutenant Field and his crew caught U-681, on the surface southwest of the Scilly Isles and straddled the vessel with a perfect salvo of depth charges. Forty survivors exited the U-boat before it sank. The survivors were picked up by British naval units.
- 25 April 1945: Lieutenant Nott and crew spotted a schnorkel on the surface southwest of the Brest peninsula and dropped a salvo of depth charges directly on top of the unsuspecting submarine. The schnorkel was blown into the air, a large oil slick appeared, and the body of one of the German submariners surfaced. Postwar examination of records indicate that the submarine was U-326.
- 28 May 1945: Operations were ceased on orders from 19 Group Coastal Command. A detachment of two aircraft was sent to the Azores for duty.
- 4–14 June 1945: VPB-103 departed England for Norfolk. Ground staff proceeded by sea aboard the tender USS Unimak, arriving on 14 June 1944. All hands were given rehabilitation leave upon arrival at Norfolk. Operational control over the squadron during this period was exercised by FAW-5.
- 24 June 1945: After return from leave the squadron was transferred to NAS Alameda, California. VPB-103 was operational at NAS Alameda by 30 September, coming under the operational control of FAW-8. Training was begun at both NAS Alameda and NAAS Crows Landing, California, but was discontinued with the cessation of hostilities in the Pacific on 10 August and the subsequent Surrender of Japan.
- 31 August 1945: VPB-103 was disestablished at NAS Alameda.

== Aircraft assignments ==
The squadron was assigned the following aircraft, effective on the dates shown:

- PB4Y-1 Liberator - March 1943
- PB4Y-2 Privateer - June 1945

== Home port assignments ==
The squadron was assigned to these home ports, effective on the dates shown:

- NAAS Camp Kearney, California - 15 March 1943
- NAS Norfolk, Virginia - 29 April 1943
- NAS Quonset Point, Rhode Island - 30 April 1943
- NAS Argentia, Newfoundland - May 1943
- RAF St Eval, England - August 1943
- RAF Dunkeswell, England - September 1943
- NAS Norfolk - 4 June 1945
- NAS Alameda, California - 24 Jun 1945

== See also ==
- Maritime patrol aircraft
- List of inactive United States Navy aircraft squadrons
- List of United States Navy aircraft squadrons
- List of squadrons in the Dictionary of American Naval Aviation Squadrons
- History of the United States Navy
