= Patrol Squadron 10 =

Patrol Squadron 10 may refer to three different United States Navy aviation squadrons:

- VPB-105, a patrol squadron which operated as Patrol Squadron 10 (VP-10) from 1924 to 1927
- VPB-23, a patrol squadron which operated as Patrol Squadron 10-F (VP-10F) from 1933 to 1937 and as Patrol Squadron 10 (VP-10) from 1937 to 1939
- VP-10, a patrol squadron commissioned in 1952
