= 1955 RAF Shackleton aircraft disappearance =

Aircraft loss in 1955

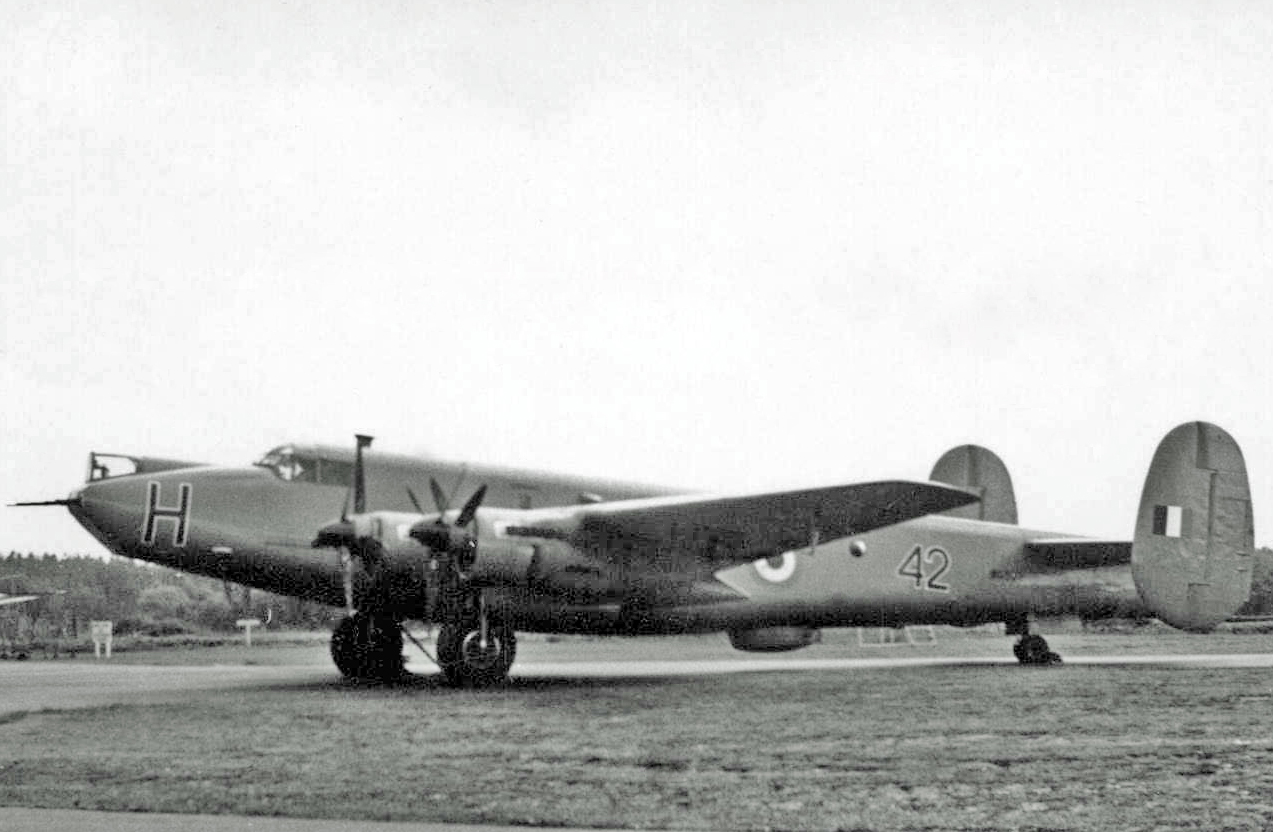
- Avro 696 Shackleton MR.2 WG533 - the type (but not the airframe) involved in the crash

Accident
- Date: 11 January 1955
- Site: Atlantic Ocean; 51.678°N 10.426°W, southwest coast of Ireland
- Total fatalities: 18

First aircraft
- Type: Avro Shackleton
- Operator: No. 42 Sqn, Royal Air Force
- Registration: WG531
- Flight origin: RAF St Eval
- Crew: 9
- Fatalities: 9

Second aircraft
- Type: Avro Shackleton
- Operator: No. 42 Sqn, Royal Air Force
- Registration: WL743
- Flight origin: RAF St Eval
- Crew: 9
- Fatalities: 9

The 1955 RAF Shackleton aircraft disappearance occurred on 11 January 1955, when two Shackleton aircraft of No. 42 Squadron, RAF, disappeared over the sea south west of the Irish coast. The main theory put forward and accepted in some circles is that the two aircraft crashed into each other after they launched within six minutes of each other, and were en route to the same area. Wreckage from one of the aircraft was found 11 years later, in a different location to their supposed accident point. At least one writer has commented on this being the worst of all the Shackleton losses.

== Background ==
No. 42 Squadron re-formed at RAF St Eval in 1952 with Shackleton MR1 reconnaissance aircraft. The squadron was part of Coastal Command, and its duty was to patrol to the south west of England, the southern part of the Irish Sea and the Atlantic Ocean. The squadron was engaged on search and patrol duties for its assigned area, and upgraded to the Shackleton MR2 variant in June 1953.

== Incident ==
On 11 January 1955, Shackleton WG531, of No. 42 Squadron, took off from RAF St Eval at 10:14 for a 15-hour patrol around the area of the Atlantic Ocean south west of Ireland known as Fastnet. At 10:20, Shackleton WL743 of the same squadron, took off from the same location to follow WG531 to the same area for the same patrol. Normally, the flights would have had a 30-minute separation in take-off times, however, some delays to the first flight, and an earlier expedited time for the second flight meant that they were only six minutes apart when leaving St Eval. However, hourly reporting showed that the navigators had made sure the aircraft had some distance between them; by 20:00, they were some 85 miles (137 km) apart.

A ground radio controller tried to contact the pilot of the second aircraft at 20:58, with a barometer reading that he had requested, but received no reply. Initially, the loss of contact was not viewed too seriously as this was a common occurrence when the aircraft were operating at their normal height above sea-level. When both aircraft were overdue to return, a search and rescue mission was launched, coordinated by the search and rescue centre at RAF Mount Batten. Another Shackleton from St Eval was launched to try and contact the two aircraft via either radio or morse code. At least eight Shackletons from St Eval, two Sunderland flying boats from RAF Pembroke Dock and RAF Aldergrove, and several ships, both military and civilian took part. HMS Launceston Castle took to the ocean at 03:50 on the following day, and proceeded to the search area. The last contact placed one of the aircraft some 50 miles (80 km) south west of Fastnet Rock.

After a three-day search, which yielded no clues, and worsening weather, the search and rescue operation was called off. No bodies of the crewmen were found. A total of 235 hours had been logged in the searching aircraft which covered an estimated 20,000 square miles (52,000 km^{2}). A board of inquiry was instituted on 14 January 1955. John Chartres described the loss of the two aircraft as "...the most catastrophic of all the Shackleton accidents."

== Aftermath ==
A memorial ceremony was held at St Eval on 31 January 1955. Later that day, wreaths were dropped in the ocean by another Shackleton from No. 42 Squadron. In July 1966, a trawler working off the south west coast of Ireland, discovered No. 4 engine from WL743 in one of its nets. The trawler had been working between the Skellig and Bull lighthouses, which was some 75 miles (121 km) north of the original search area. (Note: As this location was a known point for a piece of the aircraft, this has been taken for the geocoordinate location.)

Some years later, the commanding officer of the squadron was interviewed about the event, and he expressed doubt over the collision theory, stating that the mileage differences between the aircraft made it the "least probable" theory that he believed. Panel 93 of the Armed Forces Memorial in the National Arboretum commemorates the dead of the two Shackletons.
