= No. 42 Squadron RAF =

Flying squadron of the Royal Air Force

- Squadron badge
- Active: 1916–1918 (RFC); 1918–1919; 1936–1945; 1945–1945; 1946–1947; 1952–2011; 2023 – present
- Country: United Kingdom
- Branch: Royal Air Force
- Type: Operational conversion unit
- Role: Poseidon and Wedgetail flight crew and engineer training
- Part of: ISTAR Force
- Station: RAF Lossiemouth
- Motto: Fortiter in re (Latin for 'Bravely into action')
- Aircraft: Boeing Poseidon MRA1; Boeing Wedgetail AEW1 (from 2026)

Insignia
- Tail codes: QD (Apr 1939 – Sep 1939; probably not used); AW (Sep 1939 – Jun 1942 and 1943 – Dec 1945); QM (Oct 1946 – Oct 1947); A (Jun 1952 – 1956)

No. 42 Squadron, also known as No. 42 (Torpedo Bomber) Squadron or No. 42 (TB) Squadron, is a squadron of the Royal Air Force. It reformed at RAF Lossiemouth on 21 September 2023 as the operational conversion unit for both the Boeing Poseidon MRA1 and Boeing Wedgetail AEW1.

The squadron served during the First World War as an army co-operation squadron and during the Second World War in various roles. Between 1992 and 2010, it was based at RAF Kinloss as the operational conversion unit for the Hawker Siddeley Nimrod MR2, until the retirement of the aircraft in March 2010.

== History ==
=== First World War (1916–1918) ===
Formed on 1 April 1916 from crews of No. 19 Squadron Royal Flying Corps at RAF Filton, No. 42 Squadron spent the First World War flying reconnaissance sorties. Using Royal Aircraft Factory BE.2 (and later Royal Aircraft Factory R.E.8), the squadron spent time on both the Western Front and the Austro-Italian Front. The squadron was based at La Gorgue in northern France from 1 September to 8 November 1916.

=== Interwar period (1919–1938) ===
On returning to England after the war, the squadron was disbanded at RAF Netheravon on 26 June 1919. On 14 December 1936, 'B' flight of No. 22 Squadron was expanded into a new No. 42 Squadron.

=== Second World War (1939–1945) ===
In 1939, No. 42 Squadron was based at RAF Bircham Newton in Norfolk. Initially the unit was equipped with the Vickers Vildebeest before re-equipping with the Bristol Beaufort in January 1940.

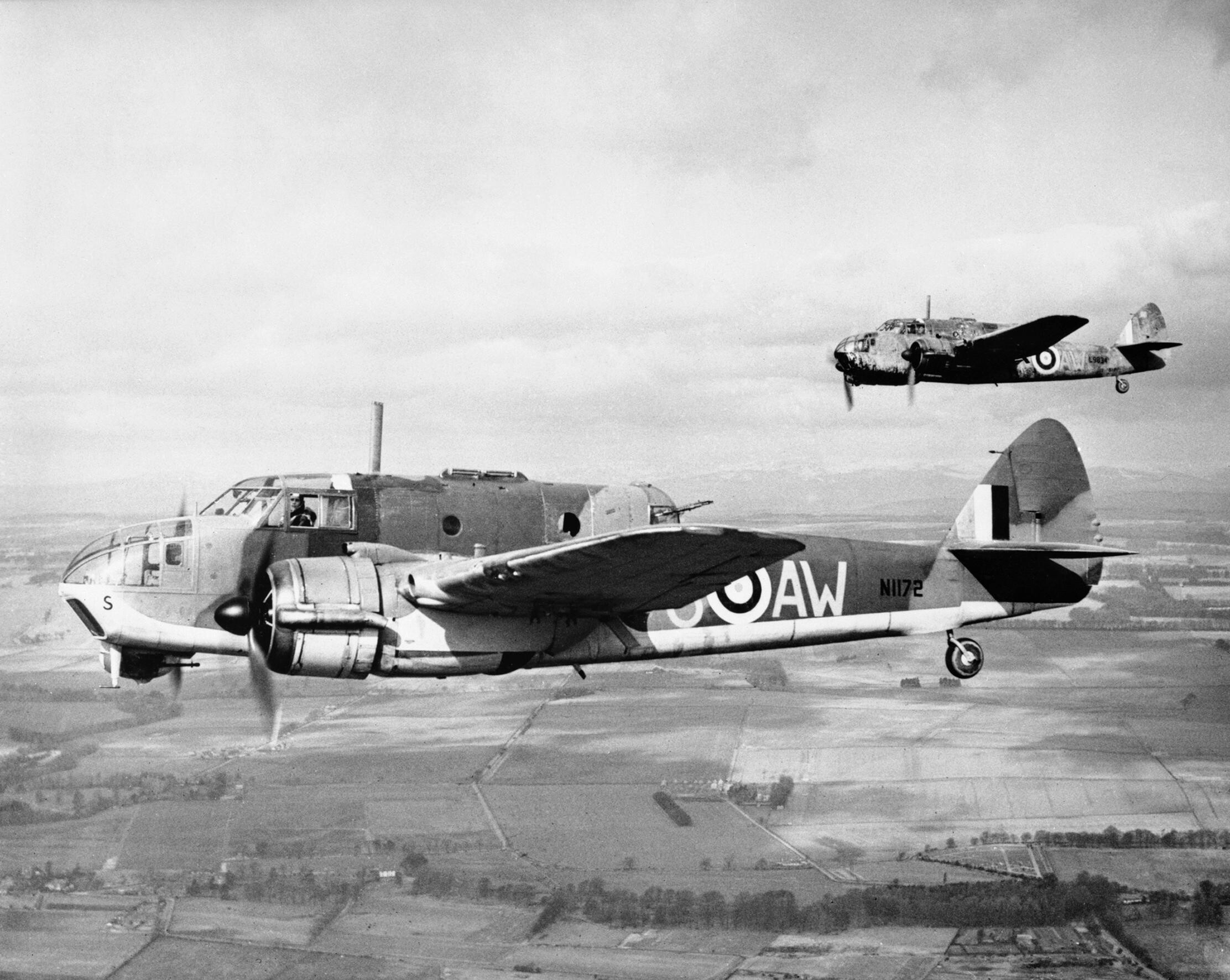
Bristol Beauforts of No. 42 Squadron, March 1941

The squadron also operated as a bomber unit in the Burma campaign flying the Bristol Blenheim during 1942 and as a fighter-bomber unit flying the Hawker Hurricane during 1943. The squadron disbanded on 30 June 1945, but the following day No. 146 Squadron was renumbered to No. 42 Squadron to operate the Republic Thunderbolts Mk.II. The squadron flew the Thunderbolt until the Burma campaign ended and thereafter disbanded on 30 December 1945 at Meiktela.

=== Cold War (1946–1990s) ===
==== Beaufighter and Shackleton ====
On 1 October 1946, No. 254 Squadron at RAF Thorney Island in West Sussez was renumbered to No. 42 Squadron. Equipped with the Bristol Beaufighter, it was a strike unit in RAF Coastal Command until disbanded on 15 October 1947.

On 28 June 1952, No. 42 Squadron was reformed at RAF St. Eval, Cornwall, flying the Avro Shackleton MR.1 in the maritime reconnaissance role. In 1954, the squadron began to re-equip with the Shackleton MR.2. On 11 January 1955, two Shackletons of No. 42 Squadron (WG531 and WL743) disappeared while operating near Fastnet Rock off the south-western coast of Ireland.

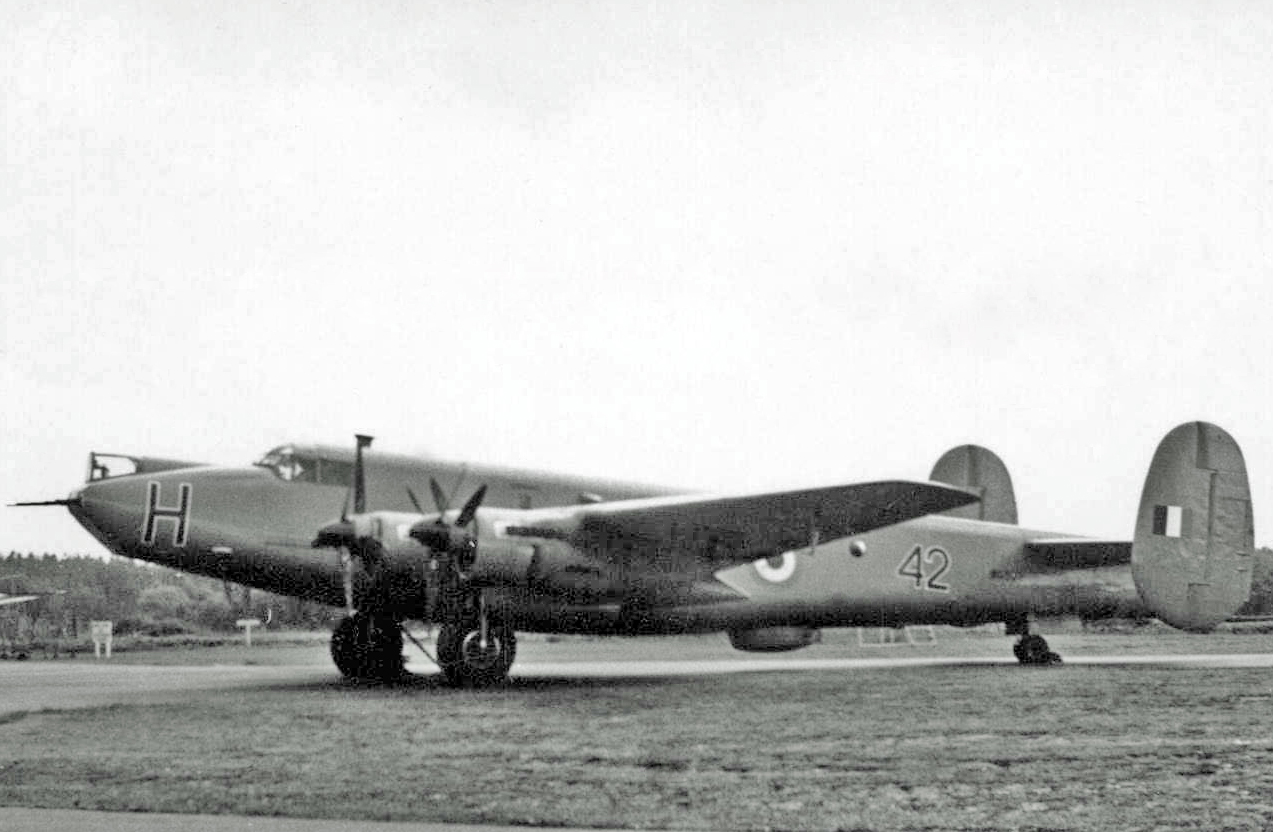
An Avro Shackleton MR.2 of No. 42 Squadron at Blackbushe Airport, September 1956

No. 42 Squadron Shackletons used to regularly visit RAF Khormaksar in Aden before the Aden Emergency, undertaking colonial policing.

No. 42 Squadron relocated to RAF St. Mawgan in Cornwall in October 1958. In 1961, the squadron deployed to Jamaica to provide support for relief operations after Hurricane Hattie struck the Caribbean and British Honduras. It converted to the Shackleton MR.3 in December 1965. In 1966, the squadron deployed to Mahajanga, Malagasy Republic, to take part in the Beira Patrol which enforced the blockade of the port of Beira in Mozambique to prevent oil shipments to Rhodesia.

==== Nimrod ====
In April 1971, No. 42 Squadron began to convert to the Hawker Siddeley Nimrod MR.1.

No. 42 Squadron was the first Nimrod unit to arrive at Wideawake Airfield, Ascension Island, when two Nimrods landed on 6 April 1982, shortly after the invasion of the Falkland Islands. In October 1984, one of the squadron's crews won the Fincastle Trophy at RAAF Base Edinburgh, South Australia. On 29 August 1985, a Nimrod MR2 helped locate the wreck of the Virgin Atlantic Challenger.

In June 1990, No. 42 Squadron won the Fincastle Trophy once again, this time at CFB Greenwood, Nova Scotia. In October 1990, the squadron deployed its crews to Seeb International Airport, Oman, and later in January 1991 to RAF Akrotiri, Cyprus, as part of Operation Granby. Nimrod MR2 XV244 (Battle Star 42) was credited with fourteen mission markings and four ship kills while deployed. One of the squadron's crews were credited with having achieved the highest number of assisted kills – six, achieved operating in a high air threat environment.

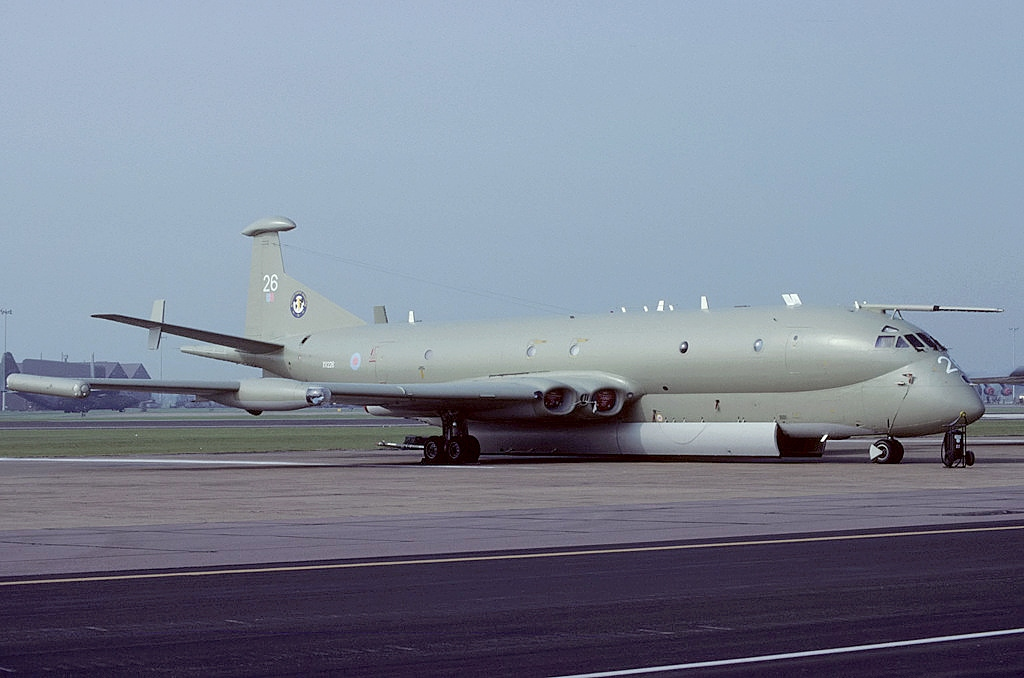
A Hawker Siddeley Nimrod MR2 of No. 42 Squadron at RAF Mildenhall, May 1992

Disbanded as a front-line unit in October 1992, the unit was later reformed as No. 42 (Reserve) Squadron at RAF Kinloss, Moray, taking over from No. 236 OCU as the Nimrod operational conversion unit (OCU).

=== 21st century (2000– present) ===
No. 42 (R) Squadron made the Nimrod's last visit to Gibraltar on 20–21 March 2010 as part of Operation Active Endeavour. The squadron flew its last Nimrod MR2 flight on 30 March 2010 with XV232 visiting Rockall, St. Kilda, RAF St. Mawgan, RAF Valley and RAF Lossiemouth. It was originally expected that the squadron would serve as the OCU for the BAE Systems Nimrod MRA4, however it was cancelled as part of the 2010 Strategic Defence and Security Review, with No. 42 (R) Squadron formally disbanding alongside the other Nimrod units on 26 May 2011.

==== Poseidon and Wedgetail ====
The unit was reformed as No. 42 (Torpedo Bomber) Squadron on 21 September 2023 at RAF Lossiemouth, Moray. The squadron is the operational conversion unit for both the Boeing Poseidon MRA1 and Boeing Wedgetail AEW1. No. 42 (TB) Squadron's first Poseidon sortie was flown on 26 September 2023.

== Aircraft operated ==
No. 42 Squadron have operated the following aircraft:

- Royal Aircraft Factory B.E.2d (April 1916 – August 1916)
- Royal Aircraft Factory B.E.2e (April 1916 – April 1917)
- Royal Aircraft Factory R.E.8 (April 1917 – February 1919)
- Vickers Vildebeest Mk.III (December 1936 – December 1937)
- Vickers Vildebeest Mk.I (January 1937 – March 1937)
- Vickers Vildebeest Mk.IV (March 1937 – April 1940)
- Vickers Vildebeest Mk.III (September 1939 – April 1940)
- Bristol Beaufort Mk.I (April 1940 – January 1942)
- Bristol Beaufort Mk.II (January 1942 – February 1943)
- Bristol Blenheim Mk.V (February 1943 – October 1943)
- Hawker Hurricane Mk.IV (October 1943 – June 1945)
- Hawker Hurricane Mk.IIc (September 1944 – December 1944)
- Hawker Hurricane Mk.IIc (April 1945 – June 1945)
- Republic Thunderbolt Mk.II (July 1945 – December 1945)
- Bristol Beaufighter TF.10 (October 1946 – October 1947)
- Avro Shackleton MR.1/1A (June 1952 – July 1954)
- Avro Shackleton MR.2 (January 1953 – January 1966)
- Avro Shackleton MR.3 (November 1965 – September 1971)
- Hawker Siddeley Nimrod MR.1 (April 1971 – August 1984)
- Hawker Siddeley Nimrod MR2 (August 1983 – April 2011)
- Boeing Poseidon MRA1 (September 2023 – present)

== Heritage ==
The squadron's badge features a figure of the Greek mythological figure Perseus, on a terrestrial globe. Perseus represents the Bristol Perseus engine, which No. 42 Squadron was the first to use. He was known always to achieve his objective and destroy his enemies and stands in front of a globe to signify his activities over many lands and seas.

The squadron's motto is Fortiter in re (Latin for 'Bravely into action').

== Battle honours ==
No. 42 Squadron has received the following battle honours. Those marked with an asterisk (*) may be emblazoned on the squadron standard.

- Somme (1916)
- Western Front (1916–1918)*
- Arras (1917)
- Ypres (1917)
- Italian Front & Adriatic (1917–1918)*
- Lys
- Channel & North Sea (1939–1942)*
- Biscay (1940)*
- Baltic (1941)*
- Fortress Europe (1941)
- Eastern Waters (1943)*
- Arakan (1943–1944)*
- Pacific (1943–1945)
- Manipur (1944)*
- Burma (1944–1945)*
- South Atlantic (1982)
- Gulf (1991)

== See also ==
- List of Royal Air Force aircraft squadrons
