= German submarine U-966 =

German World War II submarine

- U-570 Type VIIC submarine that was captured by the UK in 1941. This U-boat is almost identical to U-966.

History

Nazi Germany
- Name: U-966
- Ordered: 5 June 1941
- Builder: Blohm & Voss, Hamburg
- Yard number: 166
- Laid down: 1 May 1942
- Launched: 14 January 1943
- Commissioned: 4 March 1943
- Fate: Scuttled on 10 November 1943

General characteristics
- Class & type: Type VIIC submarine
- Displacement: 769 tonnes (757 long tons) surfaced; 871 t (857 long tons) submerged
- Length: 67.10 m (220 ft 2 in) o/a; 50.50 m (165 ft 8 in) pressure hull
- Beam: 6.20 m (20 ft 4 in) o/a; 4.70 m (15 ft 5 in) pressure hull
- Height: 9.60 m (31 ft 6 in)
- Draught: 4.74 m (15 ft 7 in)
- Installed power: 2,800–3,200 PS (2,100–2,400 kW; 2,800–3,200 bhp) (diesels); 750 PS (550 kW; 740 shp) (electric)
- Propulsion: 2 shafts; 2 × diesel engines; 2 × electric motors
- Speed: 17.7 knots (32.8 km/h; 20.4 mph) surfaced; 7.6 knots (14.1 km/h; 8.7 mph) submerged
- Range: 8,500 nmi (15,700 km; 9,800 mi) at 10 knots (19 km/h; 12 mph) surfaced; 80 nmi (150 km; 92 mi) at 4 knots (7.4 km/h; 4.6 mph) submerged
- Test depth: 220 m (720 ft); Crush depth: 250–295 m (820–968 ft)
- Complement: 4 officers, 44–52 enlisted
- Armament: 5 × 53.3 cm (21 in) torpedo tubes (four bow, one stern); 14 × torpedoes or; 26 TMA mines; 1 × 8.8 cm (3.46 in) deck gun (220 rounds); 1 × twin 2 cm (0.79 in) C/30 anti-aircraft gun

Service record
- Part of: 5th U-boat Flotilla; 4 March – 31 July 1943; 9th U-boat Flotilla; 1 August – 10 November 1943
- Identification codes: M 51 418
- Commanders: Oblt.z.S. Eckehard Wolf; 4 March – 10 November 1943
- Operations: 1 patrol: 5 October – 10 November 1943
- Victories: None

German submarine U-966 was a Type VIIC U-boat of the German Navy (Kriegsmarine) during World War II.

She was ordered on 5 June 1941, and was laid down on 1 May 1942 at Blohm & Voss, Hamburg, as yard number 166. She was launched on 14 January 1943 and commissioned under the command of Oberleutnant zur See Eckehard Wolf on 4 March 1943.

== Design ==
German Type VIIC submarines were preceded by the shorter Type VIIB submarines. U-966 had a displacement of 769 tonnes (757 long tons) when at the surface and 871 tonnes (857 long tons) while submerged. She had a total length of 67.10 m (220 ft 2 in), a pressure hull length of 50.50 m (165 ft 8 in), a beam of 6.20 m (20 ft 4 in), a height of 9.60 m (31 ft 6 in), and a draught of 4.74 m (15 ft 7 in). The submarine was powered by two Germaniawerft F46 four-stroke, six-cylinder supercharged diesel engines producing a total of 2,800 to 3,200 metric horsepower (2,060 to 2,350 kW; 2,760 to 3,160 shp) for use while surfaced, two Garbe, Lahmeyer & Co. RP 137/c double-acting electric motors producing a total of 750 metric horsepower (550 kW; 740 shp) for use while submerged. She had two shafts and two 1.23 m (4 ft) propellers. The boat was capable of operating at depths of up to 230 metres (750 ft).

The submarine had a maximum surface speed of 17.7 knots (32.8 km/h; 20.4 mph) and a maximum submerged speed of 7.6 knots (14.1 km/h; 8.7 mph). When submerged, the boat could operate for 80 nautical miles (150 km; 92 mi) at 4 knots (7.4 km/h; 4.6 mph); when surfaced, she could travel 8,500 nautical miles (15,700 km; 9,800 mi) at 10 knots (19 km/h; 12 mph). U-966 was fitted with five 53.3 cm (21 in) torpedo tubes (four fitted at the bow and one at the stern), fourteen torpedoes or 26 TMA mines, one 8.8 cm (3.46 in) SK C/35 naval gun, 220 rounds, and one twin 2 cm (0.79 in) C/30 anti-aircraft gun. The boat had a complement of 44 to 52 men.

== Service history ==
On 10 November 1943, U-966 was attacked by an RAF Wellington of 612 Squadron/B and then US Navy B-24 Liberators of squadrons VB-103 and VB-110.

Later that day Liberator GR Mk V BZ774/D of the RAF's Czechoslovak-crewed 311 Squadron/D sighted U-966 at 43°45′N 08°00′W. The submarine headed for the neutral Spanish coast at full speed but at 13:54 BZ774/D attacked her with wing-mounted SAP60 semi-armour piercing rocket projectiles (RPs).

Several of the RPs failed to function, and the Czechoslovak aircrew was unable to see any effects on the target from those that did. But U-966 slowed to an estimated six to eight knots, and then within 200 yards (180 m) of the Spanish coast she slowed to two knots before running aground. 42 of her 50 crew survived. They scuttled her in the Bay of Biscay off O Porto de Bares, Galicia, Spain, after several depth charge attacks badly damaged her, then took to their dinghies and were interned in Spain.

The wreck is at 43°46′8″N 07°38′0″W. The wreckage was found in various locations near Punta de Estaca de Bares by a team of three Spanish divers in June 2018.

== Bibliography ==
- Busch, Rainer; Röll, Hans-Joachim (1999). German U-boat commanders of World War II : a biographical dictionary. Translated by Brooks, Geoffrey. London, Annapolis: Greenhill Books, Naval Institute Press. ISBN 1-55750-186-6.
- Busch, Rainer; Röll, Hans-Joachim (1999). Der U-Boot-Krieg, 1939-1945: Deutsche U-Boot-Verluste von September 1939 bis Mai 1945 [German U-boat losses from September 1939 to May 1945] (in German). Vol. IV. Hamburg, Berlin, Bonn: Mittler. ISBN 3-8132-0514-2.
- Gröner, Erich; Jung, Dieter; Maass, Martin (1991). U-boats and Mine Warfare Vessels. German Warships 1815–1945. Vol. 2. Translated by Thomas, Keith; Magowan, Rachel. London: Conway Maritime Press. ISBN 0-85177-593-4.
- Vančata, Pavel (2013). 311 Squadron. Sandomierz: Stratus, for Mushroom Model Publications. p. 63. ISBN 978-83-61421-43-6.
