= 2d Antisubmarine Squadron =

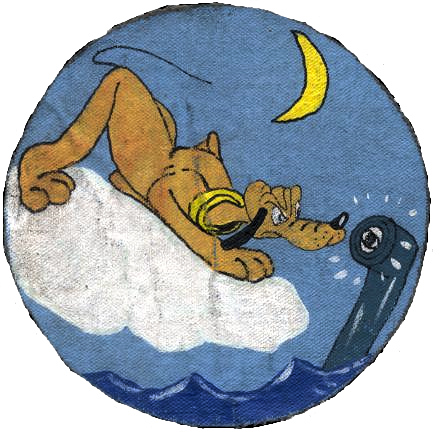
- Emblem of the 2d Antisubmarine Squadron
- Active: 1942-1944
- Country: United States
- Branch: United States Air Force
- Role: Anti-Submarine

The 2d Antisubmarine Squadron is an inactive United States Air Force unit. Its last assignment was with the 480th Antisubmarine Group, based at Clovis Army Airfield, New Mexico, and under the command of Col. Jack Roberts. On 13 November 1943, the 2d Antisubmarine Squadron was directed to relinquish their assignment to the U.S. Navy and to return to the United States with all personnel and equipment. For its role in the war, the group, which existed for only one year, was awarded a Distinguished Unit Citation, It was inactivated on 29 January 1944.

== History ==
=== Lineage ===
- Constituted 523d Bombardment Squadron on 13 October 1942.

Activated on 18 October 1942
Redesignated: 2d Antisubmarine Squadron on 23 November 1942
Disbanded on 29 January 1944.

=== Assignments ===
- 378th Bombardment Group, 18 October 1942
- 25th Antisubmarine Wing, 14 December 1942

Attached to: VIII Bomber Command, c. 2 January 1942
Attached to: 1st Antisubmarine Group [Prov], 15 January 1943
Attached to: 2037th Antisubmarine Wing [Prov], 1 March-21 June 1943

- 480th Antisubmarine Group, 21 June 1943 – 29 January 1944.

=== Stations ===
- Langley Field, Virginia, 18 October-26 December 1942.
- RAF St Eval, England, 2 January 1943
- Port Lyautey, French Morocco, c. 11 March-25 November 1943

Operated from Agadir, French Morocco, July 1943

- Clovis AAF, New Mexico, C. 4–29 January 1944.

=== Aircraft ===
- B-17 Flying Fortress, 1942
- B-18 Bolo, 1942
- B-34 Ventura, 1942
- B-24 Liberator, 1942-1944.

=== Operational history ===
The 2d Antisubmarine Squadron was formed at Langley Field, Virginia training on mixture of B-17 Flying Fortresses, B-18 Bolos and B-34 Ventura as aerial antisubmarine killer hunter squadron. Redesignated 2d Antisubmarine Squadron and reassigned to 25th Antisubmarine Wing upon inactivation of initial training group.

Deployed to RAF St Eval England initially as part of VIII Bomber Command then 1st Antisubmarine Wing (Heavy), (subsequently redesignated 2037th Antisubmarine Wing (Provisional) and ultimately 480th Antisubmarine Group). The squadron was the first USAAF Antisubmarine Command squadron to cross the Atlantic. Trained with RAF Coastal Command using B-24 Liberators in aerial antisubmarine tactics.

Deployed again to Port Lyautey in French Morocco in March 1943 to shore up scanty Allied antisubmarine defenses in the Atlantic approaches to the Straits of Gibraltar as part of 2037th Antisubmarine Wing (Provisional) under the operational control of the United States Navy (USN) Fleet Air Wing 15 (FAW-15), which answered to the commander of the Moroccan Sea Frontier.

The squadron flew B-24s daily on operational missions as part of the 480th Antisubmarine Group, covering an area as far south as 30°N, as far north as Cape Finisterre, Spain, and as far west as a thousand nautical miles from Port Lyautey. Much of the time, the Liberators flew convoy coverage for ships sailing from or approaching the Straits of Gibraltar. The 480th's antisubmarine activity reached a peak in July 1943 when enemy U-boats concentrated off the coast of Portugal to intercept convoys bound for the Mediterranean. The squadron destroyed and damaged several submarines during the month, which aided in protecting supply lines to forces involved in the campaign for Sicily. At the time, the 480th Antisubmarine Group was under the command of Colonel Jack Roberts and consisted of both the 1st and 2nd Antisubmarine Squadrons. The group was assigned to the Northwest African Coastal Air Force under the command of Air Vice-Marshal Hugh Lloyd but they operated under the control of USN FAW-15 at Port Lyautey, French Morocco, now Kenitra, Morocco.

Returned to the United States in November 1943 and disbanded on 29 January 1944.

== Bibliography ==
- Maurer, Maurer, ed. (1982) [1969]. Combat Squadrons of the Air Force, World War II (PDF) (reprint ed.). Washington, DC: Office of Air Force History. ISBN 0-405-12194-6. LCCN 70605402. OCLC 72556. Archived from the original (PDF) on 20 December 2016.
