= 1st Antisubmarine Squadron =

1st Antisubmarine Squadron (later 361st Tactical Missile Squadron)
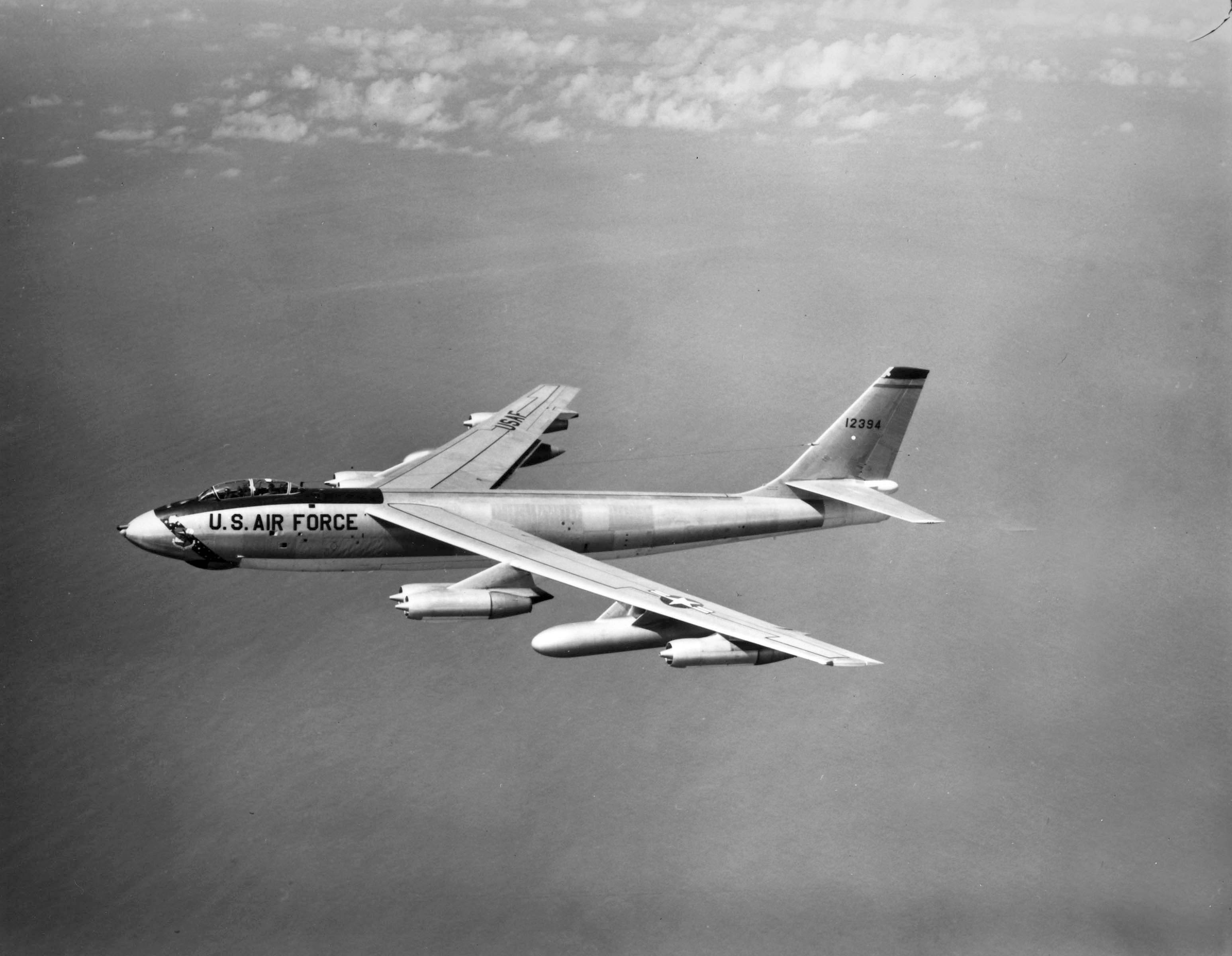
- Strategic Air Command B-47 Stratojet
- Active: 1942-1944; 1958-1962
- Country: United States
- Branch: United States Air Force
- Role: Antisubmarine, Bombardment
- Engagements: European Theater of Operations; Mediterranean Theater of Operations
- Decorations: Distinguished Unit Citation

The 361st Tactical Missile Squadron is an inactive United States Air Force unit. It was formed in 1985 by the consolidation of the 1st Antisubmarine Squadron and the 661st Bombardment Squadron. However, the squadron was never active under its new title.

The first predecessor of the squadron was activated in 1942 as the 361st Bombardment Squadron. It engaged in antisubmarine operations off the Pacific Coast. In November 1942, it was redesignated as the 1st Antisubmarine Squadron and operated from bases in England, Morocco, and Tunisia until the antisubmarine mission transferred to the United States Navy. It returned to the United States in January 1944 and its remaining personnel were used to form new heavy bomber units.

The squadron's second predecessor was the 661st Bombardment Squadron, formed in 1958 when Strategic Air Command (SAC) expanded its Boeing B-47 Stratojet units from three to four squadrons when they began standing alert at their home stations. It was inactivated in 1962 when SAC's alert commitment changed.

== History ==
=== World War II ===
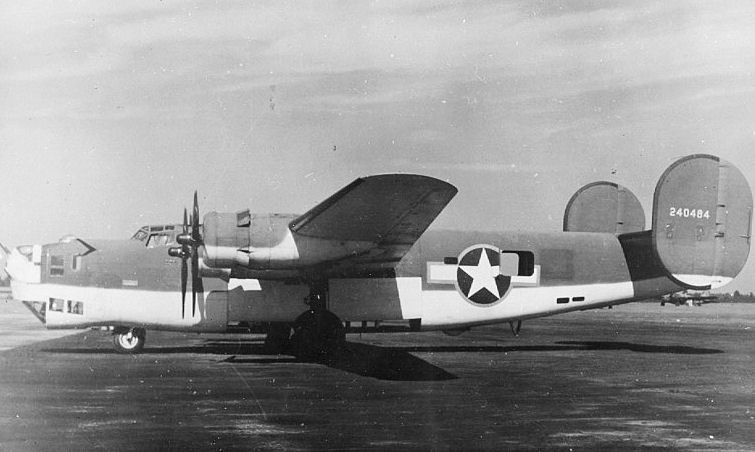
B-24 equipped for antisubmarine warfare

The first predecessor of the squadron was organized as the 361st Bombardment Squadron at Salt Lake City Army Air Base, Utah in July 1942. It was one of the original squadrons of the 304th Bombardment Group. The squadron was only nominally manned until September, when it moved with the 304th Group to Geiger Field, Washington. The squadron moved to Ephrata Army Air Field, Washington, later that month and equipped with Boeing B-17 Flying Fortress (briefly) and Consolidated B-24 Liberator heavy bombers.

The following month, the 304th Group moved to Langley Field, Virginia, where it became part of AAF Antisubmarine Command. In the fall of 1942, the Kriegsmarine began to equip its U-boats with radar receivers capable of detecting the Royal Air Force's long-wave radars used for air-to-surface-vessel (ASV) radar. This enabled the subs to dive, avoiding detection while on the surface. RAF's Coastal Command requested reinforcements from the AAF in the form of B-24s equipped with ASV radar operating in the microwave band. In response, the squadron's air echelon was dispatched to RAF St Eval, England on 10 November to support Coastal Command. On arrival in England, it was attached to VIII Bomber Command for operations. Later that month, it was redesignated the 1st Antisubmarine Squadron.

The squadron flew its first mission from St Eval on 10 November, operating under the control of Coastal Command, training on British operational methods and use of radar while conducting operational missions over the Atlantic lasting up to twelve hours. In January, the squadron was joined by the 2d Antisubmarine Squadron, forming a provisional group. In February, the squadron joined RAF units in a concerted attack on German submarines returning from attacks on convoys in the Atlantic. The group conducted its last mission from England on 5 March 1943.

In March the squadron moved to Craw Field, French Morocco, where they augmented two United States Navy squadrons flying Consolidated PBY Catalinas defending the Atlantic approaches to the Straits of Gibraltar. It was administratively attached to the Northwest African Coastal Air Force, but was operationally assigned to Fleet Air Wing 15 of the Moroccan Sea Frontier. Much of the squadron's flying time was spent providing convoy coverage to ships approaching or departing the Straits of Gibraltar, but it also flew patrols as far north as Cape Finisterre and as far west as 1000 miles west of Port Lyautey, French Morocco into the Atlantic.

As the German submarine threat in the Atlantic diminished and moved farther west in August 1943, the squadron moved to Protville Airfield, Tunisia in September. It attacked enemy submarines and shipping in the area of Sicily and the Italian peninsula until Operation Avalanche began with landings at Salerno, Italy. It extended antisubmarine patrols after 9 September to cover the sea west of Sardinia and Corsica. In addition to the antisubmarine patrols, the squadron covered the escape of Italian naval vessels from Genoa and Spezia to Malta following Italy's surrender. The squadron's actions in Europe earned it a Distinguished Unit Citation.

The squadron returned to Morocco on 18 September and returned to the United States in November 1943, it was inactivated in January 1944 and its personnel were used as cadres for newly forming heavy bomber groups.

=== Cold War ===
From 1958, the Boeing B-47 Stratojet wings of Strategic Air Command (SAC) began to assume an alert posture at their home bases, reducing the amount of time spent on alert at overseas bases. The SAC alert cycle divided itself into four parts: planning, flying, alert and rest to meet General Thomas S. Power’s initial goal of maintaining one third of SAC’s planes on fifteen minute ground alert, fully fueled and ready for combat to reduce vulnerability to a Soviet missile strike. To implement this new system B-47 wings reorganized from three to four squadrons. The 661st was activated at Pease Air Force Base as the fourth squadron of the 509th Bombardment Wing. The alert commitment was increased to half the squadron's aircraft in 1962 and the four squadron pattern no longer met the alert cycle commitment, so the squadron was inactivated on 1 January 1962.

In 1985, the two previous squadrons were consolidated, on paper, under the title of the 361st Tactical Missile Squadron.

== Lineage ==
1st Antisubmarine Squadron

- Constituted as the 361st Bombardment Squadron (Heavy) on 28 January 1942

Activated on 15 July 1942
Redesignated: 1st Antisubmarine Squadron (Heavy) on 23 November 1942
Disbanded on 29 January 1944
Reconstituted and consolidated with the 661st Bombardment Squadron, Medium as the 361st Tactical Missile Squadron on 19 September 1985

661st Bombardment Squadron

- Constituted as the 661st Bombardment Squadron, Medium on 1 December 1958

Activated on 1 March 1959
Inactivated on 1 January 1962
Consolidated with the 1st Antisubmarine Squadron on 15 September 1985 as the 361st Tactical Missile Squadron

361st Tactical Missile Squadron

- Formed on 15 September 1985 by consolidation of the 1st Antisubmarine Squadron and the 661st Bombardment Squadron (inactive)

=== Assignments ===
- 304th Bombardment Group, 15 July 1942 (air echelon attached to VIII Bomber Command after c. 10 November 1942)
- 25th Antisubmarine Wing, 30 December 1942 (air echelon attached to VIII Bomber Command until 15 January 1943), (attached to 1st Antisubmarine Group (Provisional) until l March 1943, 2037th Antisubmarine Wing (Provisional))
- 480th Antisubmarine Group, 21 June 1943 – 29 January 1944
- 509th Bombardment Wing, 1 March 1959 – 1 January 1962

=== Stations ===
- Salt Lake City Army Air Base, Utah, 15 July 1942
- Geiger Field, Washington, 15 September 1942
- Ephrata Army Air Field, Washington, 1 October 1942
- Langley Field, Virginia, 29 October–26 December 1942 (operated from RAF St Eval, England after 10 November 1942)
- RAF St Eval (Sta 129), England, 13 January 1943
- Port Lyautey, French Morocco, 9 March–27 November 1943 (operated from Agadir, French Morocco, July 1943, Protville Airfield, Tunisia, 2–18 September 1943)
- Clovis Army Air Field, New Mexico, c. 4–29 January 1944
- Pease Air Force Base, New Hampshire, 1 March 1959 – 1 January 1962

=== Aircraft ===
- Boeing B-17 Flying Fortress, 1942
- Consolidated B-24 Liberator, 1942-1944
- Boeing B-47 Stratojet, 1958-1962

=== Awards and campaigns ===
Award streamer	Award	Dates	Notes
	Distinguished Unit Citation	10 November 1942-28 October 1943	361st Bombardment Squadron (later 1st Antisubmarine Squadron)

Campaign Streamer	Campaign	Dates	Notes
	Air Offensive, Europe	10 November 1942 – 27 November 1943	361st Bombardment Squadron (later 1st Antisubmarine Squadron)
	Air Combat, EAME Theater	10 November 1942 – 27 November 1943	361st Bombardment Squadron (later 1st Antisubmarine Squadron)
	Antisubmarine, EAME Theater	10 November 1942 – 27 November 1943	361st Bombardment Squadron (later 1st Antisubmarine Squadron)
