= RAF St Eval =

Former RAF base in Cornwall, England

RAF St Eval USAAF Station 129
- Near St Eval, Cornwall in England
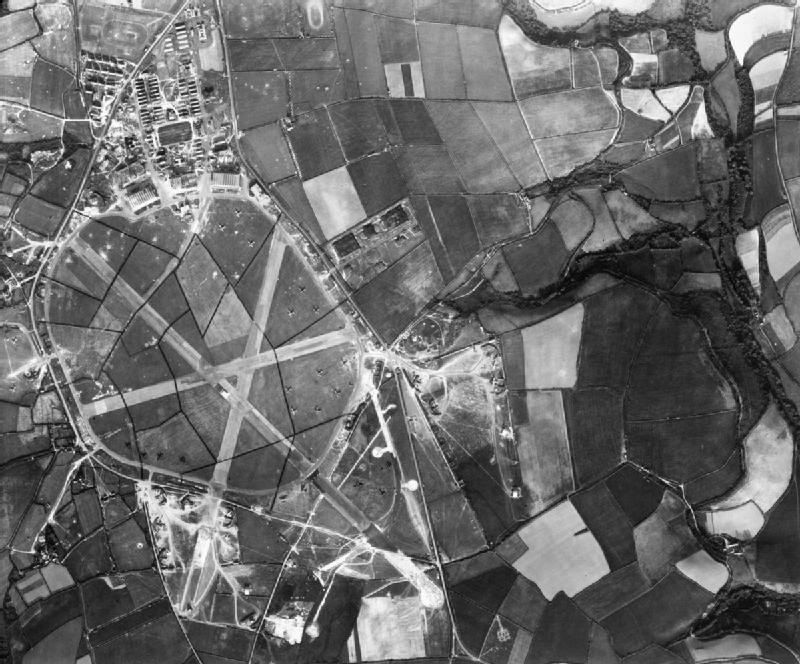
- RAF St Eval airfield on 18 July 1942

Site information
- Type: Royal Air Force station
- Owner: Air Ministry
- Operator: Royal Air Force; United States Army Air Forces
- Controlled by: RAF Fighter Command; RAF Coastal Command

Location
- Shown within Cornwall RAF St Eval (the United Kingdom)
- Coordinates: 50°28′41″N 004°59′58″W

Site history
- Built: 1938
- In use: 1939 - 1959
- Battles/wars: European theatre of World War II

Airfield information
- Elevation: 98 metres (322 ft) AMSL
Runways
| Direction | Length and surface |
|---|---|
| 06/24 | 1,750 metres (5,741 ft) Concrete |
| 12/30 | 1,700 metres (5,577 ft) Concrete |
| 18/36 | 1,430 metres (4,692 ft) Concrete |

Royal Air Force St Eval or RAF St Eval is a former Royal Air Force station for the RAF Coastal Command, southwest of Padstow in Cornwall, England, UK. St Eval's primary role was to provide anti-submarine and anti-shipping patrols off the south west coast. Aircraft from the airfield were also used for photographic reconnaissance missions, meteorological flights, convoy patrols, air-sea rescue missions and protection of the airfield from the Luftwaffe.

== History ==
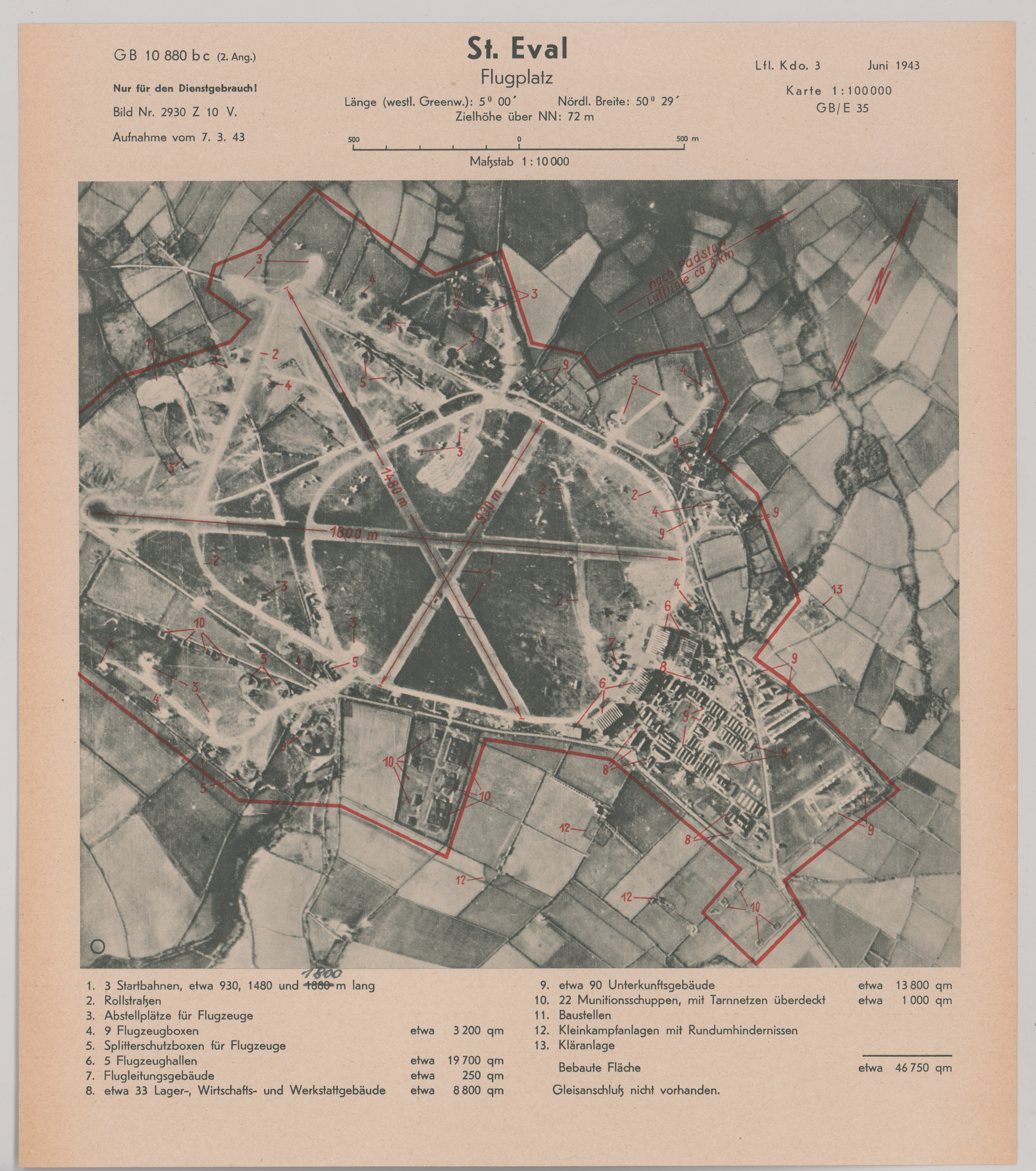
RAF St Eval on a target dossier of the German Luftwaffe, 1943

=== The construction of the station ===
The Royal Air Force's 1930s expansion plan included a requirement for a station to provide anti-submarine and anti-shipping patrols off the South-west coast of England. The site at St Eval was chosen as a Coastal Command airfield and work started in 1938. Five widely dispersed cottages, two houses and portions of two farms were acquired by compulsory purchase; the village of St Eval was completely demolished in order to build the airfield. Levelling of the site by G Wallace Ltd involved the removal by bulldozers of many Cornish hedges and three ancient tumuli. One householder tried to hold out against the authorities and refused to leave his cottage for several days. Only the church survived which the RAF adopted as their station church and it still stands today. The work progressed well and RAF St Eval opened on 2 October 1939.

=== Battle of Britain ===
In June 1940 St Eval became a Fighter Command sector headquarters during the Battle of Britain and Supermarine Spitfires were stationed there. These were joined by Hawker Hurricane and Bristol Blenheim fighters. The station's aircraft took an active part in the conflict.

=== Meteorological flights ===
The formation in December 1940 of No 404 (later 1404) Meteorological Flight was significant. The flight was tasked with providing basic weather data on which the Command meteorologists could base their forecasts. It was a role which St Eval performed throughout the war.

=== Attacks on St Eval ===
The presence of the Spitfires was not a great success as the Luftwaffe's change in tactics led to an increase in night raids for which the Spitfires were not suited. Therefore, 238 Squadron were posted in with Hurricanes. The airfield was hit a number of times in the summer of 1940 and early 1941. This caused considerable damage and casualties with the Germans carrying out further raids in May 1942, causing damage to buildings and the destruction of aircraft. St Eval was equipped with a green box barrage rocket device which sent a steel wire curtain into the air to descend on parachutes. This was intended to enmesh enemy aircraft and cause them to crash, but the device was unsuccessful.

| Date | Incident |
|---|---|
| 12 July 1940 | During the afternoon a single Ju 88 dropped eight bombs causing minor damage before it was chased off by two Spitfires. Another source gives the count as 3 bombs plus strafing. |
| 21 August 1940 | Three Ju 88s bombed St Eval, causing damage to two hangars and destroying three Blenheims. Hurricanes managed to shoot down two of the German aircraft. Another source gives the attacking aircraft as Messerschmitts and records 17 casualties. |
| 22 August 1940 | 14 high explosive bombs and 200 incendiaries were dropped without causing much damage. |
| 23 August 1940 | A direct hit on a pyrotechnics store caused a large explosion. |
| 26 August 1940 | St Eval was bombed at 2130 and 2158 hours. |
| 29 August 1940 | 5 HE and some incendiary bombs were dropped on St Eval, but no damage was caused. |
| 30 September 1940 | At about 2300 hours, five high explosive bombs were dropped, two landing on the aerodrome and three outside. No damage was reported. |
| 3 October 1940 | St Eval was attacked between 0655 and 0710 hours two Spitfires, one Avro Anson were completely destroyed and two hangars were also hit. Out of 20 bombs dropped on the airfield in this raid only 4 went off, causing injuries to four people. |
| 9 October 1940 | Several bombs were dropped on St Eval with some damage but no casualties. |
| 14 October 1940 | At 2111 hours, six high explosive bombs and 20 incendiaries were dropped on the Station. Another source states only 20 bombs in total. There were no casualties and no damage was caused. |

=== Attack on the German battleship Gneisenau ===
On 6 April 1941 a small force of Beauforts from 22 Squadron, operating on detachment from St Eval, launched an attack on the German battleship Gneisenau in Brest harbour. A Beaufort was able to launch a torpedo at point blank range but was shot down. However, the ship was severely damaged below the water line, so was obliged to return to the dock for repair. The pilot of the Beaufort, Flying Officer Kenneth Campbell RAF, was posthumously awarded the Victoria Cross.

=== Attempted Irish defection ===
On 9 January 1942, a Supermarine Walrus of the Irish Air Corps was stolen from Rineanna airfield, Country Clare, by four Irish servicemen. Their intention was to fly to France to join the Luftwaffe. However, they were intercepted by RAF Spitfires and escorted to St Eval, where they landed and were detained by RAF Police. Subsequently, they and the aircraft were returned to Ireland.

=== No. 61 Squadron ===
In the summer of 1942 No. 61 Squadron was twice loaned to Coastal Command for anti-submarine operations in the Bay of Biscay. It was detached from its station in Rutland to St Eval and on the very first occasion that it operated from there – on 17 July 1942 – a crew became the first in RAF Bomber Command to bring back irrefutable evidence that they had destroyed a U-boat at sea – a photograph showing the U-boat crew in the water swimming away from their sinking vessel.

=== American use of the airfield ===
To boost the anti-submarine forces and to gain experience in the role, the Americans began to use the airfield (as station 129) with Consolidated B-24 Liberator bombers of the 409th Bombardment Squadron (93d Bombardment Group), being deployed from RAF Alconbury in Huntingdonshire in October 1942.

The following month they were replaced by the 1st Antisubmarine Squadron being deployed from Langley Field, Virginia with the 2d Antisubmarine Squadron arriving in January 1943 forming the 1st Antisubmarine Group (Provisional) with specialized long-range Liberator bombers equipped with RADAR and other submarine detection equipment. From St. Eval, the squadrons flew killer hunts against German U-boats in the Bay of Biscay. Both of these squadrons were reassigned to Port Lyautey in French Morocco in March 1943 to shore up scanty Allied anti-submarine defences in the Atlantic approaches to the Straits of Gibraltar. German U-boats had very recently sunk four ships in an Allied convoy about a hundred miles off the coast of Portugal. Also, over the long term, the Allies wanted to increase air anti-submarine patrols and convoy coverage to secure their preparations for the impending Tunisian offensive and the subsequent invasion of Sicily.

The Army Air Forces Antisubmarine Command formed the 479th Antisubmarine Group at St Eval in July with four squadrons of Liberators to continue the antisubmarine campaign. The 479th's most effective antisubmarine patrols were conducted from 18 July to 2 August 1943, the period in which the group made nearly all of its attacks on the U-boats. After that time the Germans avoided surfacing during daylight and adopted a policy of evasion, but the group continued its patrols, often engaging Luftwaffe fighter interceptor aircraft.

This was once again a short-lived arrangement and the group took its Liberators to RAF Dunkeswell on 6 August, ending the American use of the station.

=== Loss of Whitley in submarine attack ===
On 20 June 1943, in the Bay of Biscay, one of a pair of Whitleys operated by 10 OTU from St. Eval was shot down while attacking a submarine believed to be the Barbarigo, of the Italian navy. All of the Whitley's crew were killed.

=== Accident at St Eval ===
In August 1943 a Whitley and Liberator collided on the runway. The Whitley caught fire which cooked the depth charges and caused a massive explosion and the loss of both the aircraft and crews. The collision was in part due to the poor runway layout, with a blind spot that hid one aircraft from the other.

=== 1944 – The end of the war ===
The importance of St Eval was such that it was given a FIDO installation in early 1944 for dispersal of fog around the runway so that aircraft could land safely. The thick sea-fogs that rolled in off the sea meant that St Eval was the only FIDO base that was equipped with additional burners, set outwards of 75 yards (69 m) from the other burners. St Eval was destined to have a busy time during the allied invasion of Europe.

It was home to three RAF Liberator squadrons (53, 224, 547). Many of these were equipped with the highly successful Leigh Light. In April, a fourth squadron arrived, giving the station one of the most powerful anti-submarine forces in the RAF. This force flew thousands of hours of patrols each month and was rewarded with a number of sightings, many of which were converted into attacks, with at least three confirmed U-boat kills in June alone.

The Allied capture of French ports meant that the U-boat threat was drastically reduced. This meant that the units posted to St Eval could be better used elsewhere and by the autumn of 1944 the airfield was a shadow of its former self.

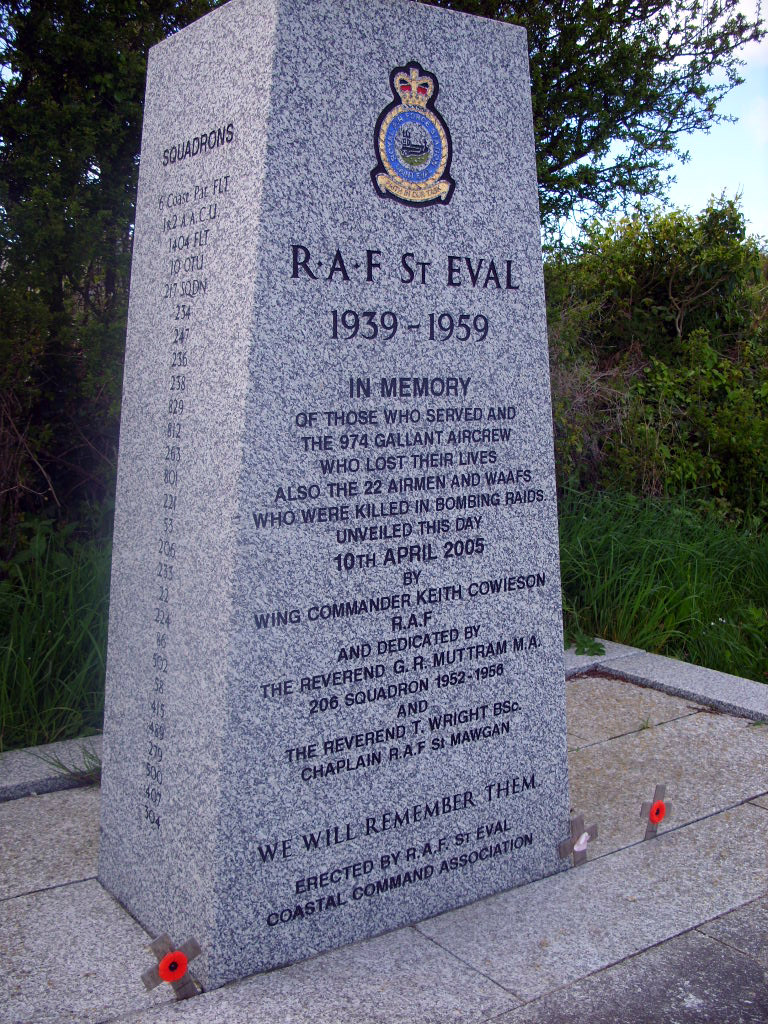
RAF St Eval memorial

=== Post Second World War ===
The station continued to be used for maritime patrols and search and rescue duties. It was also a site for diversions with a number of military and commercial aircraft making use of St Eval due to bad weather at their destination airfield. The Station closed on 6 March 1959, with the existing squadrons moving to nearby RAF St. Mawgan. The airfield became home to the transmitters and aerial farm used for the low frequency communications used by the maritime Nimrods flying from RAF St Mawgan with the receiver site near RAF Mountbatten, Plymouth.

== Current use ==
The site is home to a high frequency transmitter station forming part of the Defence High Frequency Communications Service. The station is operated by Babcock International Group on behalf of the Ministry of Defence.

== Memorials ==
There are various memorials in St Ulvelus church, including a Book of Remembrance, a memorial window and a memorial to the crew of Shackleton VP254, who were killed in a crash off the Borneo coast on 9 December 1958.

A memorial tablet to the two crews of Shackletons WG531 and WL743 (squadron codes A-H and A-F respectively) of No.42 Squadron that probably collided whilst on an exercise off the Fastnet Rock on 11 January 1955, is displayed in St Columba's church, St Columb Major.

A memorial was unveiled on the site of the base in 2005 which commemorates the aircrew and ground staff who were killed during the Second World War in patrols, or casualties of bombing raids.

== Units stationed at RAF St Eval ==
=== 1939–1945 ===
| Squadron | Dates Stationed | Planes Used | Duties |
|---|---|---|---|
| 22 Squadron det | early 1941 – June 1941 | Bristol Beaufort | |
| 22 Squadron | 28 October 1941 – 1 February 1942 | Bristol Beaufort | |
| 42 Squadron det | 1941 | Bristol Beaufort | Anti-shipping and mine laying along the coasts of northern Europe |
| 48 Squadron det | 3 September – 17 July 1940 | Bristol Beaufort | |
| 53 Squadron | 20 March 1941 – 17 December 1941 | Bristol Blenheim | Anti-submarine and anti-shipping patrols off the coast of France |
| 53 Squadron | 16 May 1942 – 3 July 1942 | Lockheed Hudson | Anti-submarine and anti-shipping patrols off the coast of France |
| 53 Squadron | 3 January 1944 – 13 September 1944 | Consolidated B-24 Liberator | |
| 58 Squadron | 8 April 1942 – 30 August 1942 | Armstrong Whitworth Whitley | General reconnaissance unit |
| 58 Squadron | 31 March 1943 – 29 June 1943 | Handley Page Halifax | General reconnaissance unit |
| 59 Squadron det | 1942–1943 | B-24 Liberator | |
| 61 Squadron det | 1942 | Avro Lancaster | Anti-submarine operations in the Bay of Biscay |
| 86 Squadron | 10 January 1942 – 5 March 1942 | Bristol Beaufort | |
| 140 Squadron det | 1942 | various | |
| 143 Squadron | 28 August 1943 – 16 September 1943 | Bristol Beaufighter | Provide fighter support for anti-submarine aircraft operating over the Bay of Biscay |
| 161 Squadron det | 1942 - ? | various | |
| 179 Squadron | 1 November 1944 – 30 September 1946 | Vickers Wellington; Vickers Warwick | Anti-submarine patrols over the Bay of Biscay and the Western approaches |
| 206 Squadron | 30 May 1941 – 12 August 1941 | Lockheed Hudson | Patrol the south-west approaches |
| 206 Squadron | 12 April 1942 – 11 July 1944 | Boeing B-17 Flying Fortress | |
| 217 Squadron | 2 October 1939 – Mar 1942 | Avro Anson; Bristol Beaufort | Attacks on enemy shipping and minelaying |
| 220 Squadron det | November 1940 – April 1941 | Lockheed Hudson | |
| 221 Squadron det | November 1940 – Sept 1941 | Vickers Wellington | Convoy escort patrols |
| 224 Squadron | 20 December 1941 – 19 February 1942 | Lockheed Hudson | Patrols off Brest and attack shipping off the coast of Brittany |
| 224 Squadron | 23 April 1943 – 11 September 1944 | B-24 Liberator | Anti-submarine operations over the Bay of Biscay and attacks on shipping over the French Coast |
| 233 Squadron | 16 August 1941 – July 1942 | Lockheed Hudson | Patrols over the Bay of Biscay |
| 234 (Madras Presidency) Squadron | 18 June 1940 – 24 February 1941 | Supermarine Spitfire | Convoy patrols in the South West approaches and the English Channel with a secondary role of defending the airfield and surrounding area |
| 235 Squadron det | early 1943 | Bristol Beaufighter | |
| 236 Squadron | July 1940 - late 1941 | Bristol Blenheim | Fighter and reconnaissance |
| 238 Squadron | 14 August 1940 – 10 September 1940 | Hawker Hurricane | Defending the airfield |
| 247 (China British) Squadron det | summer 1940 - summer 1941 | Gloster Gladiator; Hawker Hurricane | |
| 248 Squadron | Summer 1941 | Bristol Blenheim | |
| 254 Squadron det | late 1940 | Bristol Blenheim | |
| 263 (Fellowship of the Bellows) Squadron | 24 February 1941 – 18 March 1941 | Westland Whirlwind | |
| 280 Squadron det | autumn 1944 - autumn 1945 | Vickers Warwick | |
| 282 Squadron | 19 September 1944 – 9 July 1945 | various | Air Sea Rescue (ASR) |
| 304 Squadron | 6 March 1945 – 9 July 1945 | Vickers Wellington | |
| 407 Squadron RCAF | 1 October 1942 – 10 November 1942 | Lockheed Hudson | |
| 407 Squadron RCAF | 3 November 1943 – 2 December 1943 | Vickers Wellington | |
| 415 Squadron RCAF | 11 April 1942 – late 1942 | Handley Page Hampden | |
| 489 Squadron RNZAF det | May 1942 – June 1942 | Bristol Blenheim | |
| 500 (County of Kent) Squadron AAF | 30 August 1942 – 5 November 1942 | Lockheed Hudson | |
| 502 (Ulster) Squadron AAF | February 1942 – June 1943 | Armstrong Whitworth Whitley; Handley Page Halifax | Anti-submarine patrols over the Bay of Biscay |
| 517 Squadron | 7 August 1943 – 25 November 1943 | Handley Page Hampden; Lockheed Hudson | Meteorological flights over the Western Approaches |
| 541 Squadron det | 1943 | Supermarine Spitfire | Photographic reconnaissance missions |
| 543 Squadron det | late 1942–1943 | Supermarine Spitfire | Photographic reconnaissance missions over France |
| 547 Squadron | 14 January 1944 – 1 October 1944 | B-24 Liberator | Anti-submarine patrols over the Bay of Biscay |
| 612 (County of Aberdeen) Squadron AAF | 1 November 1943 – 3 December 1943 | Vickers Wellington | Anti-submarine patrols over the Bay of Biscay |
| 796 Naval Air Squadron det | August – September 1948 | | |
| 801 Naval Air Squadron | 31 January 1941 – 6 February 1941 | Blackburn Skua | |
| 807 Naval Air Squadron | 20 – 23 August 1949 | Hawker Sea Fury | |
| 812 Naval Air Squadron det | November 1940 – December 1940 | Fairey Swordfish | |
| 816 Naval Air Squadron det | April 1941 – May 1941 | Fairey Swordfish | |
| 820 Naval Air Squadron | 11 – 18 November 1944 | Grumman TBF Avenger | |
| 827 Naval Air Squadron | 11 May 1941 – 4 June 1941 | Fairey Albacore | |
| 829 Naval Air Squadron | 7 October 1940 – 3 November 1940 | Fairey Albacore | |
| 833 Naval Air Squadron | 11 March 1943 – 15 April 1943 | Fairey Swordfish | |
| 849 Naval Air Squadron | 9–26 August 1944 | TBF Avenger | |
| No. 2 Anti-Aircraft Co-operation Unit RAF | ? - April 1940 | various | |
| No. 6 Coastal Patrol Flight RAF | 15 January 1940 – 27 May 1940 | de Havilland Tiger Moth | |
| No. 1 Photographic Reconnaissance Unit RAF (PRU) | 1 July 1940 – October 1942 | various | Recces of targets in Western France, particularly naval bases |
| 404 (Met) Flight/1404 (Met) Flight (Later becoming 517 Squadron) | 24 December 1940 – 11 August 1943 | Handley Page Hampden; Bristol Blenheim; Lockheed Hudson; Armstrong Whitworth Albemarle | Meteorological unit |
| No. 8 Anti-Aircraft Co-operation Unit RAF | March 1941 – June 1941 | various | |
| No. 10 Operational Training Unit RAF det | 1942 – 23 July 1943 | Armstrong Whitworth Whitley | |

=== 1945–1959 ===
| Unit | Aircraft | From | To | To | Duties |
|---|---|---|---|---|---|
| 42 Squadron | Avro Shackleton MR 1A/MR 2 | 28 June 1952 | 8 October 1958 | RAF St Mawgan | Maritime reconnaissance |
| 179 Squadron | Vickers Wellington XIV; Vickers Warwick V Avro Lancaster ASR 3 | 1 November 1944 | 30 September 1946 | Disbanded | |
| 203 Squadron | Avro Lancaster GR 3 | 16 January 1947 | 15 August 1952 | RAF Topcliffe | |
| 206 Squadron | Avro Shackleton MR 1A/MR 2 | 27 September 1952 | 14 January 1958 | RAF St Mawgan | Reconnaissance and rescue patrols over the western approaches |
| 210 Squadron | Avro Lancaster ASR 3 | 1 June 1946 | 10 September 1952 | RAF Ballykelly | Maritime patrols and air-sea rescue |
| 220 Squadron | Avro Shackleton MR 1/MR 2 | 14 November 1951 | 4 December 1956 | RAF St Mawgan | |
| 228 Squadron | B-24 Liberator VIII | 1 June 1946 | 30 September 1946 | Disbanded | Passenger and freight services to Northern Ireland, Gibraltar, the Azores and Morocco. It also had reconnaissance, air-sea rescue and meteorological tasks |
| 228 Squadron | Avro Shackleton MR 2 | 1 July 1954; 14 January 1958 | 29 November 1956; 6 March 1959 | RAF St Mawgan; Disbanded | Maritime reconnaissance |
| 240 Squadron | Avro Shackleton MR 1 | 27 May 1952 | 5 June 1952 | RAF Ballykelly | Maritime reconnaissance |
| No. 95 Gliding School RAF | Slingsby Cadet | June 1945 | 31 January 1950 | Unknown | |
| No. 19 Group Communication Flight RAF | Various | 29 July 1948 | 27 August 1951 | Unknown | |
| Target Towing Flight? | de Havilland Mosquito | September 1953 | September 1955 | Unknown | |
| No. 626 Gliding School RAF | Slingsby Cadet | 1 June 1958 | 16 March 1963 | Unknown | |

The following units were also here at some point:

- No. 67 Maintenance Unit RAF
- No. 2731 Squadron RAF Regiment
- No. 2738 Squadron RAF Regiment
- No. 2782 Squadron RAF Regiment
- Signals Development Unit RAF

== See also ==
- St Eval
- Anti-submarine warfare
- List of former Royal Air Force stations
