= List of B-57 units of the United States Air Force =

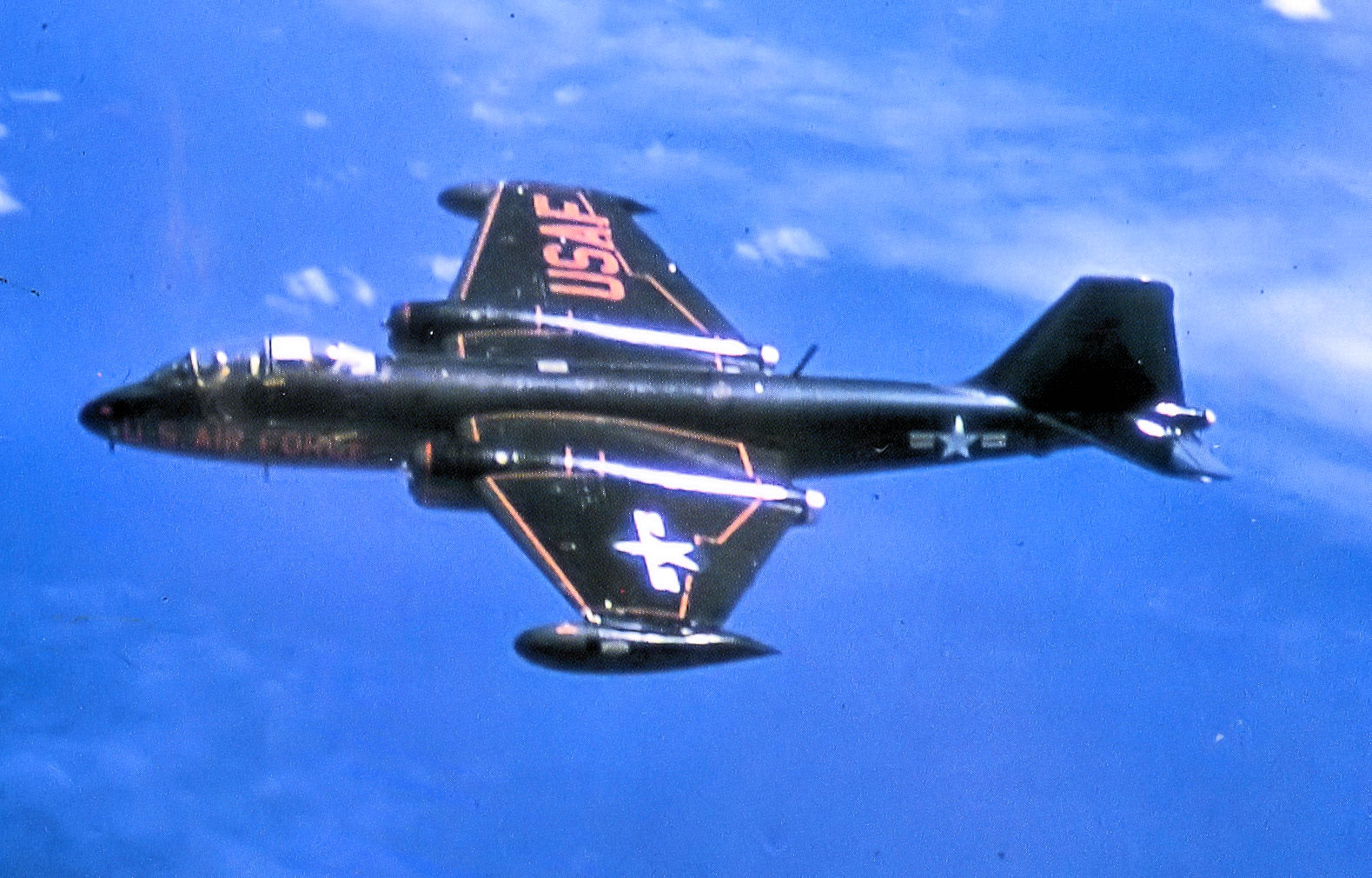
Martin B-57C Canberra from the 3d Bombardment Wing, Johnson Air Base, Japan, 1956. Shown in the original USAF black night motif.

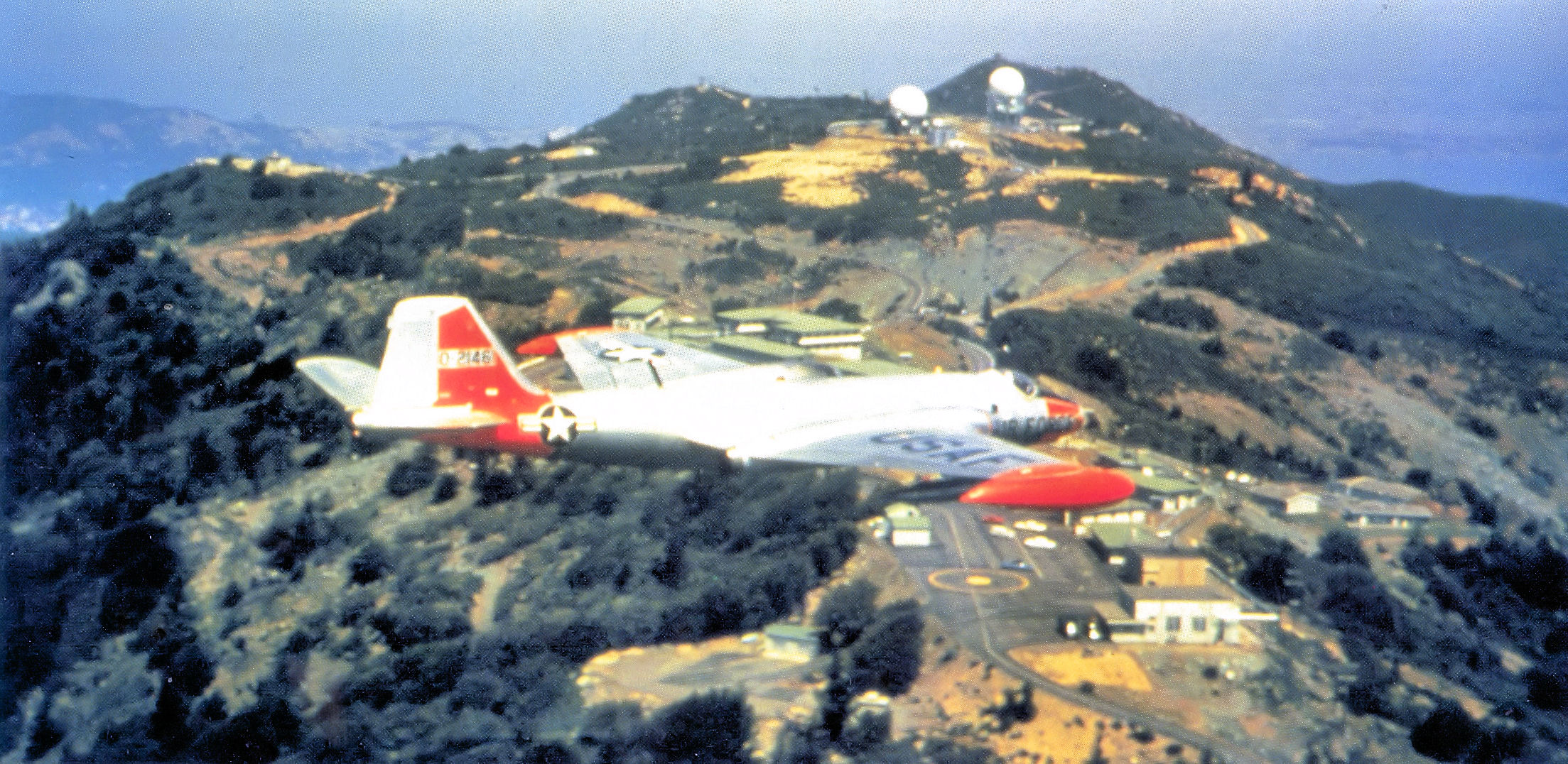
EB-57A Air Defense Command Defense Systems Evaluation Aircraft.

The Martin B-57 Canberra was first manufactured in 1953, and the United States Air Force had accepted a total of 403 B-57s before production ended in early 1957. The last USAF B-57 was retired in 1983.

It was the last tactical bomber used by the United States Air Force, being engaged in combat operations during the Vietnam War (1963–1971). It also performed a wide variety of other missions. This list is of the units it was assigned to, missions performed, and the bases it was stationed.

== Units ==
=== Tactical Bombardment ===
The B-57B Tactical Bomber was the replacement for the World War II B-26 Invader. Assigned to TAC, USAFE, PACAF. 202 aircraft produced. Production began in 1952, deliveries began in 1954. TAC aircraft sent to Air National Guard by 1958, being replaced by F-100 Super Sabre. USAFE aircraft withdrawn from France in 1957 by agreement with French Government.

PACAF 8th and 13th Bombardment Squadrons flew B-57B Tactical Bombers in combat during Vietnam War, 1964–1969. The B-57G modification (Tropic Moon Night Intruder, 18 B-57B aircraft modified, 1968–1969) flew in combat 1970–1972. Last aircraft retired from Air National Guard, 1974.

The B-57Cs was a limited-production dual-control trainer version of the B-57B (1954–1958). 38 produced. A small number of B-57Cs were later re-equipped and redesignated as RB-57C for service alongside RB-57A Reconnaissance aircraft as trainers when the latter were issued to ANG units.

- 3d Bombardment Wing, Tactical (B-57B/C) (PACAF)

Johnson AB, Japan, 1956–1960
Yokota AB, Japan, 1960–1963

8th Bombardment Squadron, Tactical
13th Bombardment Squadron, Tactical
90th Bombardment Squadron, Tactical

- 345th Bombardment Wing, Tactical (B-57B/C) (TAC)

345th Bombardment Group (1954–1957) received first production USAF B-57Bs, July 1954
Langley AFB, Virginia, 1954–1959

498th Bombardment Squadron, Tactical
499th Bombardment Squadron, Tactical
500th Bombardment Squadron, Tactical
501st Bombardment Squadron, Tactical

- 461st Bombardment Wing, Tactical (B-57B/C) (TAC)

Hill AFB, Utah, 1955–1956
Blytheville AFB, Arkansas, 1956–1958

764th Bombardment Squadron, Tactical
765th Bombardment Squadron, Tactical
766th Bombardment Squadron, Tactical

- 3510th Combat Crew Training Wing, (B-57B/C) (ATC)

Randolph AFB, Texas, 1954–1956

3511th Combat Crew Training Squadron

- 17th Bombardment Group, Tactical (B-57B/C) (TAC)

Hurlburt Field, Florida, 1955–1956

34th Bombardment Squadron, Tactical

- 38th Bombardment Group, Tactical (B-57B/C) (USAFE)

Laon-Couvron AB, France, 1955–1957

71st Bombardment Squadron, Tactical
405th Bombardment Squadron, Tactical
822d Bombardment Squadron, Tactical

- 41st Air Division (B-57B) (PACAF)

Yokota Air Base, Japan, 1964

8th Bombardment Squadron, Tactical
13th Bombardment Squadron, Tactical

- 405th Fighter Wing (B-57B) (PACAF)

Clark Air Base, Philippines, 1965–1968

8th Bombardment Squadron, Tactical (Tail Code: PQ)
13th Bombardment Squadron, Tactical (Tail Code: PV)
Both squadrons performed rotating temporary duty at:

Tan Son Nhut Air Base, Bien Hoa Air Base, Da Nang Air Base, South Vietnam, 1965–1968

- 35th Tactical Fighter Wing (B-57B) (PACAF)

Phan Rang Air Base, South Vietnam, 1968–1969

8th Bombardment Squadron, Tactical (Tail Code: PQ)
13th Bombardment Squadron, Tactical (Tail Code: PV)

- 15th Tactical Fighter Wing (B-57G) (TAC)

MacDill AFB, Florida, 1969–1972

13th Bombardment Squadron, 1969–1970 (Tail Code: FS)
4424th Combat Crew Training Squadron, 1969–1972 (Tail Code: FS)

- 8th Tactical Fighter Wing (B-57G) (PACAF)

Ubon RTAFB, Thailand, 1970–1972

13th Bombardment Squadron (Tail Code: FK)

=== Tactical Reconnaissance ===
The RB-57A was the replacement for the RB-26 night reconnaissance aircraft. 67 produced. The aircraft was filled with various cameras and was unarmed, its mission being day and night, high and low, and visual and photographic reconnaissance. It filled the photo-reconnaissance mission of the RB-26, but were not reliable and also had a high accident rate. Replaced by the RB-66B Destroyer and RF-101C Voodoo by 1958; survivors sent to the Air National Guard. Some were converted to Air Defense Command EB-57A electronic warfare aircraft to provide training for air defense radar units. By 1973, most of the surviving R/EB-57A's had been retired to AMARC at Davis Monthan AFB, Arizona. A few were converted to RB-57F strategic reconnaissance/weather reconnaissance aircraft.

Ten RB-57As were modified for high-altitude strategic reconnaissance over non-friendly areas under "Project Heartthrob". Designated RB-57A-1s, they flew high-altitude reconnaissance missions over Eastern Europe, Communist China and North Korea in the late 1950s. Two other RB-57As, designated RB-57A-2 were modified with a bulbous nose containing AN/APS-60 mapping radar and a SIGINT direction finder system in 1957 under project SARTAC.

Eight RB-57Es were modified from B-57E Target Towing aircraft and were fitted with cameras and other sensors as part of the "Patricia Lynn Project" during the Vietnam War. They were used in spotting Viet Cong river traffic at night along the Mekong Delta southeast of Saigon. In 1969/70, Patricia Lynn missions were flown into Laos and into Cambodia. The Patricia Lynn operation was terminated in mid-1971.

- 10th Tactical Reconnaissance Wing (RB-57A) (USAFE)

1st Tactical Reconnaissance Squadron

Spangdahlem AB, West Germany, 1954–1957

- 363d Tactical Reconnaissance Wing (RB-57A) (TAC)

22d Tactical Reconnaissance Squadron
41st Tactical Reconnaissance Squadron
43d Tactical Reconnaissance Squadron

Shaw AFB, South Carolina, 1954–1956
(First USAF operational B-57 wing)

- 66th Tactical Reconnaissance Group (RB-57A) (USAFE)

30th Tactical Reconnaissance Squadron

Sembach AB, West Germany. 1954–1958

- 33d Tactical Group, Detachment 1, (RB-57E) (PACAF)

Re-designated: 6250th Combat Support Group Detachment 1
Re-designated: 460th Tactical Reconnaissance Wing, Detachment 1

Tan Son Nhut AB, South Vietnam, 1963–1971
Also operated from: Da Nang AB, South Vietnam

- 6021st Reconnaissance Squadron (RB-57A-1) (FEAF)

Yokota AB, Japan, 1955–1957

- 7407th Support Squadron (RB-57A-1, RB-57A-2) (USAFE)

Wiesbaden AB, West Germany, 1955–1957

=== Strategic Reconnaissance ===
The RB-57D was a high-altitude strategic reconnaissance aircraft. 20 produced. Extended wing with higher thrust engine modification of B-57B, operated in lower stratosphere. Operations remain largely classified (1957–1963). Replaced by Lockheed U-2.

The RB-57F was the result of an early-1960s program to produce a virtually new high-altitude reconnaissance aircraft out of the B-57. 21 produced. Developed from some RB-57As, RB-57Bs, and RB-57Ds in 1963 with newer engines and wider wings. Used for strategic reconnaissance. Transferred to Air Weather Service as WB-57Fs, 1968

Two WB-57Fs are the only B-57 aircraft model still flyable and in service (NASA, 2011).

- 4080th Strategic Reconnaissance Wing (RB-57D) (SAC)

4028th Strategic Reconnaissance Squadron
Detachment 1 operated from: Yokota AB, Japan
Detachment 2 operated from: Eielson AFB, Alaska

Turner AFB, Georgia, 1956–1957
Laughlin AFB, Texas, 1957–1959

- 6091st Reconnaissance Squadron (RB-57F) (PACAF)

Yokota AB, Japan, 1963–1968

- 556th Reconnaissance Squadron (RB-57F) (PACAF)

Yokota AB, Japan (RB-57F), 1968–1972

- 7407th Support Squadron (RB-57D, RB-57F) (USAFE)

Wiesbaden AB, West Germany, 1957–1964 (D), 1963–1974 (F)

=== Weather Reconnaissance ===
B/RB-57C/D/E/Fs operated by the Air Weather Service. WB-57Ds used for high altitude atmospheric sampling for nuclear weapons testing/monitoring. WF-57Fs were remaining RB-57Fs re-designation after June, 1968. Used for high-altitude weather monitoring and occasionally fitted with cameras for clandestine strategic reconnaissance flights. Retired 1981.

- 4926th Test Squadron (Sampling)

Re-designated: 1211th Test Squadron (Sampling)

Kirtland AFB, New Mexico, 1955–1963 (B-57B), 1957–1963 (RB-57D)

- 55th Weather Reconnaissance Squadron (RB-57F)

McClellan AFB, California, 1963–1964

55th Weather Reconnaissance Squadron, Detachment 1 (RB-57F)

Eielson AFB, Alaska, 1963–1964

- 56th Weather Reconnaissance Squadron, (WB-57B, R/WB-57F)

Yokota AB, Japan, 1962–1964, 1966–1972

- 57th Weather Reconnaissance Squadron, (WB-57B, R/WB-57F)

Avalon Airport, Melbourne, Victoria, Australia, 1962–1969

- 58th Weather Reconnaissance Squadron (WB-57C, WB-57E, R/WB-57F)

Kirtland AFB, New Mexico, 1 Feb 1964-1 Jul 1974

Detachment: RAAF Base East Sale, Victoria, Australia (R/WB-57F)
Detachment: El Plumerillo International Airport, Argentina (R/WB-57F)
58th Weather Reconnaissance Squadron, Detachment 1, Eielson AFB, Alaska (R/WB-57F)

=== Tow Target ===
Dedicated Air Defense Command target towing aircraft used for training of F-86D Sabre, F-94C Starfire, and F-89D Scorpion interceptors firing 2.75-inch Mk 4/Mk 40 Folding-Fin Aerial Rockets. 68 produced. As F-102 Delta Dagger interceptors firing heat-seeking AIM-4 Falcon air-to-air missiles became available, the target towing mission of the B-57E became obsolete, and beginning in 1960 the B-57Es were adapted to electronic countermeasures and faker target aircraft (EB-57E).

In order to cover combat losses in the Vietnam War, twelve B-57Es were reconfigured as combat-capable B-57Bs at the Martin factory in late 1965 and were deployed to Southeast Asia for combat. Six converted to RB-57E "Patricia Lynn" tactical reconnaissance aircraft during the Vietnam War. Retired 1974.

- 7272d Air Base Group (USAFE)

Wheelus AB, Libya, 1957–1961

- 1st Aerial Target Squadron (ADC)

Re-designated: 1st Tow Target Squadron

Biggs AFB, Texas, 1957–1960

- 3d Tow Target Squadron (TAC)

George AFB, California, 1957–1960

- 4756th Tow Target Squadron (ADC)

Tyndall AFB, Florida, 1957–1960

- 8d Bombardment Squadron, TT Flight (PACAF)

Re-designated: 6th Tow Target Squadron

Johnson AB, Japan, 1957–1960

- 17th Tow Target Squadron (ADC)

Yuma AFB, Arizona. 1957–1959
MacDill AFB, Florida, 1959–1960

=== Defense Systems Evaluation ===
Used by Air Defense Command as simulated target aircraft for interceptors and training of ground control intercept radar units. Used re-purposed RB-57As, B-57Bs, B-57Cs, B-57E as they became available from their previous missions. Used by active duty units until 1971; Air National Guard until 1983.

- 4677th Defense System Evaluation Squadron, (RB-57B, EB-57E)

4677th Defense System Evaluation Squadron, Detachment 1, Holloman AFB, New Mexico (RB-57D)
Re-designated: 17th Defense Systems Evaluation Squadron

Hill AFB, Utah, 1959–1972
Malmstrom AFB, Montana, 1972–1979

- 5040th Radar Evaluation Squadron (EB-57B) (AAC) (10th AD)

Re-designated: 5070th System Evaluation Squadron

Elmendorf AFB, Alaska, 1957–1960

- 5041st Tactical Operations Squadron (EB-57) (AAC) (21st CW)

Elmendorf AFB, Alaska, 1971–1977

- 4758th Defense Systems Evaluation Squadron (EB-57E)

Biggs AFB, Texas, 1958–1960
Holloman AFB, New Mexico, 1960–1968

- 4713th Defense Systems Evaluation Squadron (EB-57A/B/E)

Stewart AFB, New York, 1959–1969
Otis AFB, Massachusetts, 1969–1972
Westover AFB, Massachusetts, 1972–1974

- 6091st Reconnaissance Squadron (EB-57E)

Yokota AB, Japan

Re-designated: 556th Reconnaissance Squadron

Moved to Kadena AB, Okinawa.

=== Air National Guard ===
- 106th Tactical Reconnaissance Wing

149th Tactical Reconnaissance Squadron (RB-57A), 1 Aircraft
Virginia Air National Guard

Richmond ANGB, VA, Apr–Jun 1958

- 110th Tactical Reconnaissance Group

172d Tactical Reconnaissance Squadron (RB-57A/C)
Michigan Air National Guard

Battle Creek ANGB, MI, 1958–1971

- 123d Tactical Reconnaissance Group

162d Tactical Reconnaissance Squadron (RB-57B)
Kentucky Air National Guard

Louisville ANGB, KY, 1958–1965

- 152d Tactical Reconnaissance Group

192d Tactical Reconnaissance Squadron (RB-57A/C)
Nevada Air National Guard

Reno ANGB, NV, 1961–1965

- 158th Defense Systems Evaluation Group

134th Defense Systems Evaluation Squadron (EB-57B/C)
Vermont Air National Guard

Burlington ANGB, VT
Last USAF unit to operate B-57s, 1974-retired 1983.

- 189th Tactical Reconnaissance Group

154th Tactical Reconnaissance Squadron (RB-57A)
Arkansas Air National Guard

Little Rock Air Force Base, AR, 1958–1965

- 190th Tactical Reconnaissance Group

Re-Designated: 190th Defense Systems Evaluation Group

117th Tactical Reconnaissance Squadron (RB-57A, B-57G)

Re-Designated: 117th Defense Systems Evaluation Squadron, (EB-57B)

Kansas Air National Guard

Naval Air Station Hutchinson, KS, 1958
Forbes Air Force Base, KS, 1967–1976

=== Operational Support ===
Used by Air Force Systems Command at Edwards AFB, California and Eglin AFB Florida for functional test flights and modification testing. Also for various special projects such as hurricane monitoring; Air Force Special Weapons Center; high altitude research; aircraft missile launch testing; missile guidance systems testing, FAA and NASA research projects.

- 1001st Operations Group, Andrews AFB, Maryland

Star Flight, 1958–1962

- 4950th Test Wing, Wright-Patterson AFB, Ohio
- 6550th Operations Squadron, Patrick AFB, Florida
- Rome Air Development Center, Griffiss AFB, New York
- HQ, Air Defense Command, Peterson AFB, Colorado
- Air Force Flight Test Center, Edwards AFB, California
- Air Armament Center, Eglin AFB, Florida
- Federal Aviation Administration
- United States Department of Commerce (Weather)
- NASA, Ellington Field, Texas
