= 16th Airborne Command and Control Squadron =

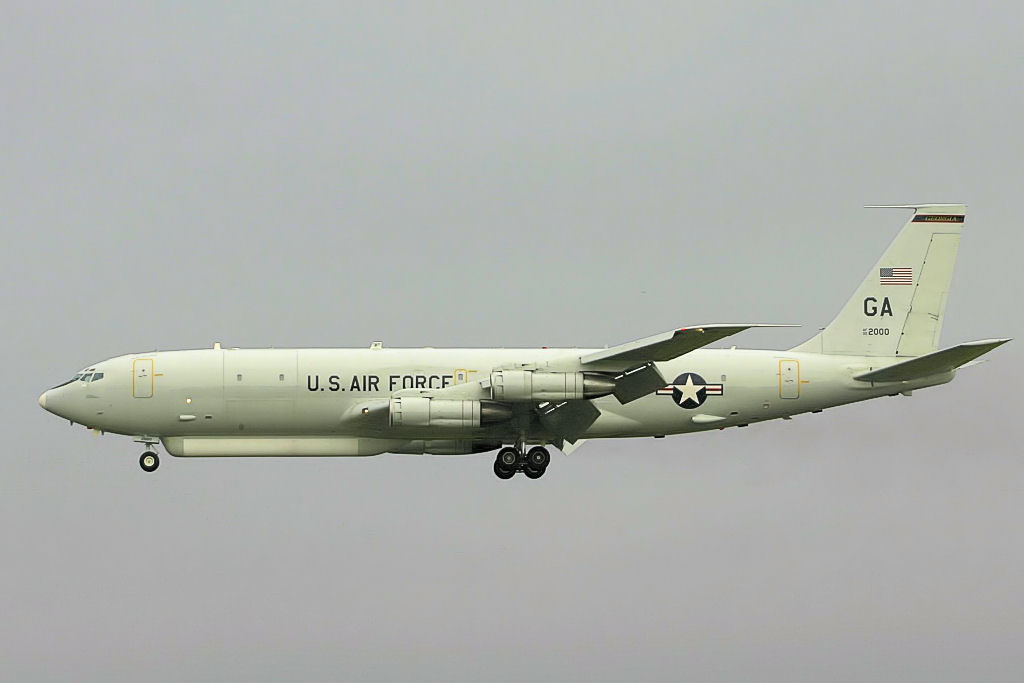
- E-8C Joint STARS aircraft of the 461st Air Control Wing
- Active: 1943–1949; 1950–1989; 1996–2023
- Country: United States
- Branch: United States Air Force
- Role: Airborne Command and Control
- Part of: Air Combat Command
- Garrison/HQ: Robins Air Force Base, Georgia
- Motto: Light the Way
- Engagements: European Theater of Operations; Vietnam War; Global War on Terrorism
- Decorations: Presidential Unit Citation; Air Force Outstanding Unit Award with Combat "V" Device; Air Force Meritorious Unit Award; Air Force Outstanding Unit Award; Belgian Fourragère; Vietnamese Gallantry Cross with Palm

Insignia
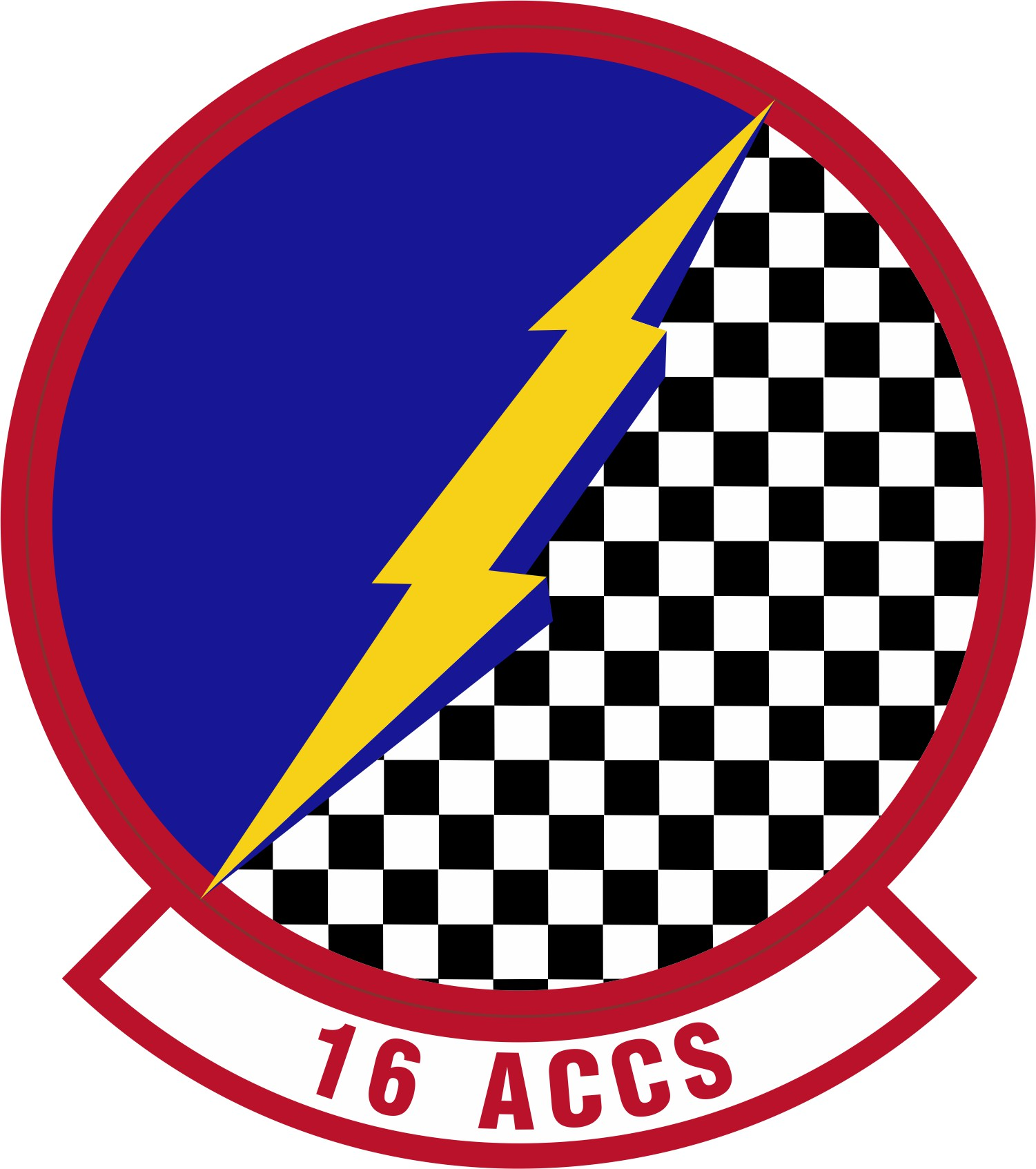
- 16th Airborne Command and Control Squadron emblem (approved 20 October 2016)

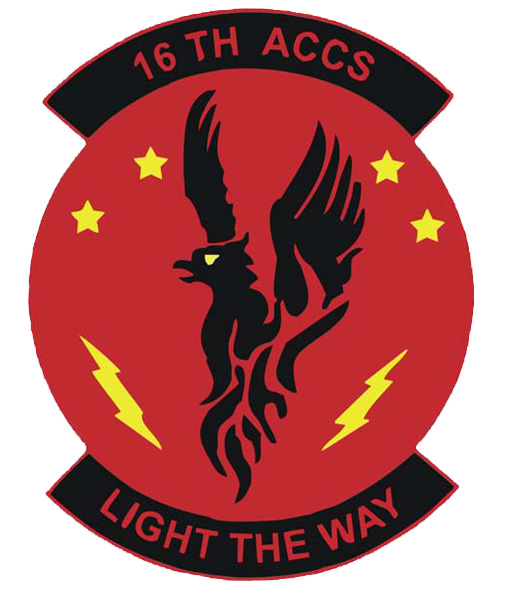
- 16th Airborne Command and Control Squadron emblem (Note: This emblem appears on the webpage of the 116th Air Control Wing, which was the squadron's headquarters while it was allotted to the Air National Guard. However, the Air Force Historical Research Agency indicates the 1952 emblem continues as the unit emblem, with a new rendition deleting the aerial camera and flash bomb being made in October 2016. Dollman.)

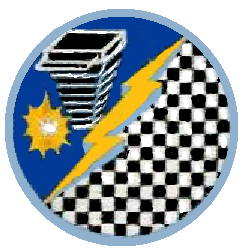
- 16th Tactical Reconnaissance Squadron emblem (approved 31 July 1952)

The 16th Airborne Command and Control Squadron was a United States Air Force squadron assigned to Air Combat Command's 461st Air Control Wing, 461st Operations Group, stationed at Robins Air Force Base, Georgia. The squadron previously flew the Northrop Grumman E-8C JSTARS, providing airborne battle management, command and control, surveillance, and target acquisition with the last E-8C flight on September 8, 2022.

== History ==
=== World War II ===
The squadron was first activated as the 380th Fighter Squadron, part of IV Fighter Command in early 1943. It engaged in the air defense of the San Francisco area as well as acting as a Replacement Training Unit until the end of 1943. It trained as a North American P-51 Mustang operational squadron before deploying to the European Theater of Operations. In Europe it became part of IX Fighter Command in England. Operated both as a tactical fighter squadron, providing air support to Allied ground forces in France as well as an air defense squadron, attacking enemy aircraft in air-to-air combat over Europe.

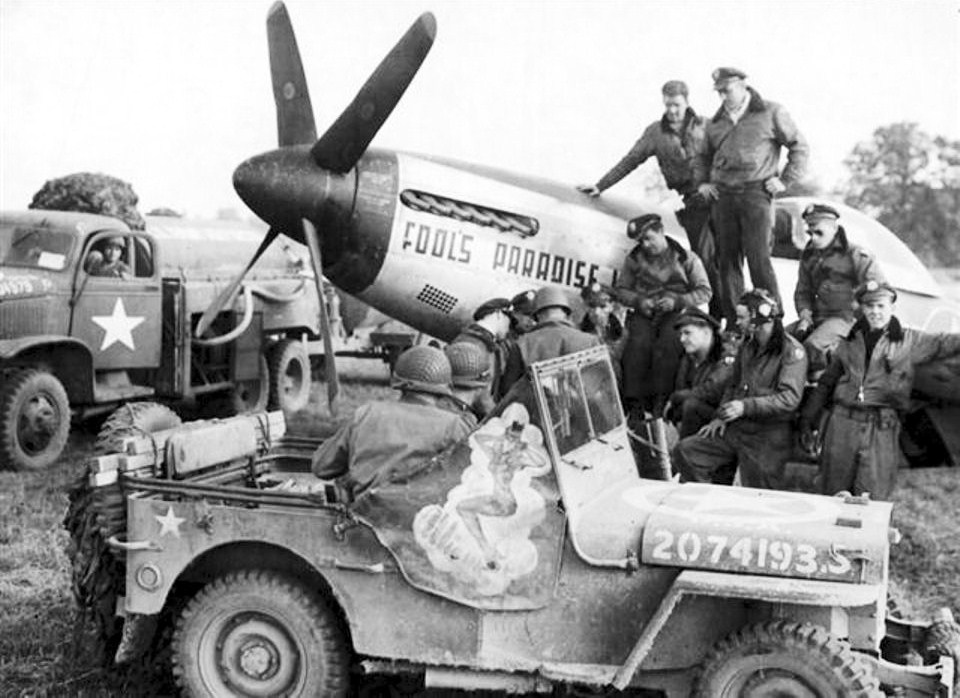
380th Fighter Squadron P-51 at Azeville Airfield

The squadron was converted to a tactical reconnaissance squadron in August 1944, when it was redesignated the 160th Tactical Reconnaissance Squadron. It engaged in hazardous reconnaissance flights over enemy-controlled territory unarmed, gathering intelligence for Allied commanders until the end of combat in Europe, May 1945. The unit advanced eastward across France using advanced landing grounds, then into the Low Countries and Occupied Germany.

The squadron remained in Germany as part of the occupation forces, returning to Langley Field, Virginia in June 1947. The unit remained assigned to Tactical Air Command as a reconnaissance squadron. The squadron was inactivated in 1949.

=== Cold War ===
In 1950 the squadron was activated once again at Langley, now designated the 16th Tactical Reconnaissance Squadron. (Note: The renumbering was required because the numbers 101–300 were reserved for Air National Guard units (now 101–299). AF Instruction 38-101, para. 5.3.4. When the squadron was allotted to the Air National Guard in 2002, it retained its number outside this block of numbers.) It moved to Shaw Air Force Base, South Carolina in 1958 where it re-equipped with McDonnell RF-101C Voodoo reconnaissance aircraft. The squadron deployed to south Florida in 1962 during the Cuban Missile Crisis, flying hazardous overflights over Cuba gathering intelligence photos. The unit upgraded to the McDonnell Douglas RF-4C Phantom II in 1965. It also operated a flight of Martin EB-57E Canberra electronic warfare aircraft. It added Douglas EB-66 Destroyer jamming aircraft beginning in 1971 as part of the phaseout of the Destroyer at Shaw. It was the last USAF active duty B-57 squadron, retiring the aircraft in 1976 when F-4G Phantom IIs took over its mission.

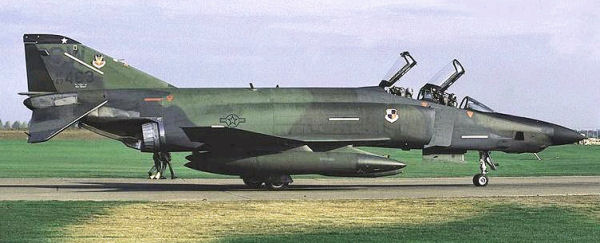
RF-4C Phantom II of the 16th Tactical Reconnaissance Squadron (Note: Aircraft is McDonnell RF-4C-34-MC Phantom II, serial 67-436. Note the NATO European camouflage schema, "SW" tail code and low visibility USAF markings. This was one of the last RF-4Cs flown by the 363d Wing before their retirement in 1989.)

=== Joint Surveillance Target Attack Radar System ===
The squadron was reactivated as the 16th Airborne Command and Control Squadron in 1996 at Robins Air Force Base, Georgia as an E-8 JSTARS squadron. In 2002, the JSTARS mission was transferred to the Georgia Air National Guard and the 116th Air Control Wing and the squadron became a Guard unit. Ten years later the mission returned to the regular Air Force, with Georgia Air National Guard associate units joining the mission. As a JSTARS squadron, the 16th flew over 5,030 combat sorties, totalling 51,138 combat hours, and earned 9 Headquarters Air Force Battle Management Aircrew of the Year awards. The squadron was inactivated on February 16, 2023.

== Lineage ==
- Constituted as the 380th Fighter Squadron (Single Engine) on 11 February 1943

Activated in March 1943
Redesignated 160th Tactical Reconnaissance Squadron on 25 August 1944
Redesignated 160th Reconnaissance Squadron, Photographic on 29 Ju1y 1946
Redesignated 160th Tactical Reconnaissance Squadron, Photographic on 14 June 1948
Inactivated on 26 April 1949

- Redesignated 160th Tactical Reconnaissance Squadron, Night Photographic on 8 August 1950

Activated on 1 September 1950
Redesignated 16th Tactical Reconnaissance Squadron, Night Photographic on 10 October 1950
Redesignated 16th Tactical Reconnaissance Squadron, Night Photographic-Jet on 8 November 1955
Redesignated 16th Tactical Reconnaissance Squadron, Photographic-Jet on 1 March 1965
Redesignated 16th Tactical Reconnaissance Squadron on 8 October 1966
Redesignated 16th Tactical Reconnaissance Training Squadron on 1 October 1979
Redesignated 16th Tactical Reconnaissance Squadron on 1 July 1982
Inactivated on 15 December 1989

- Redesignated 16th Airborne Command and Control Squadron on 15 January 1996

Activated on 1 October 1996

- Allotted to the Air National Guard on 1 October 2002
- Withdrawn from the Air National Guard on 1 October 2012 (remained active)

Inactivated on 16 February 2023

=== Assignments ===
- 363d Fighter Group (later 363d Tactical Reconnaissance Group), 1 March 1943

Air echelon attached to 10th Photographic Group, 24 December 1944 – 6 February 1945

- 10th Reconnaissance Group, 15 November 1945
- Tactical Air Command, 25 June 1947
- 363d Reconnaissance Group (later 363d Tactical Reconnaissance Group), 24 July 1947 – 26 April 1949
- 363d Tactical Reconnaissance Group, 1 September 1950
- 363d Tactical Reconnaissance Wing (later 363d Tactical Fighter) Wing), 8 February 1958 – 13 December 1989
- 93d Operations Group, 1 October 1996
- 116th Operations Group, 1 October 2002
- 461st Operations Group, 1 October 2012 – 16 February 2023

=== Stations ===
- Hamilton Field, California, March 1943
- Santa Rosa Army Air Field, California, 23 August 1943
- Oakland Municipal Airport, California, 8 October-2 December 1943
- RAF Keevil (AAF-471), England, 23 December 1943
- RAF Rivenhall (AAF-168), England, c. 3 February 1944
- RAF Staplehurst (AAF-413), England, 14 April 1944
- Maupertu Airfield (A-15), France, c. 5 July 1944
- Azeville Airfield (A-7), France, c. 22 August 1944
- Montreuil Airfield (A-38), France, 9 September 1944
- Sandweiler Airfield (A-97), Luxembourg, 11 October 1944
- Le Culot Airfield (A-89), Belgium, 29 October 1944

Operated from Conflans Airfield (A-94), France, 24 December 1944 – 6 February 1945

- Venlo Airfield (Y-55), Netherlands, 11 March 1945
- Gutersloh Airfield (R-85), Germany, 16 April 1945
- Brunswick/Waggum Airfield (R-37), Germany, 26 April 1945
- AAF Station Wiesbaden, Germany, 20 May 1945
- AAF Station Eschwege, Germany, 12 July 1945
- AAF Station Darmstadt/Griesheim, Germany, 22 September 1945
- AAF Station Fürth, Germany, 24 November 1945
- Fürstenfeldbruck Air Base, Germany, 2 March 1947
- Bad Kissingen Air Base, Germany, 14 June 1947
- Langley Field (later Langley Air Force Base), Virginia, 25 June 1947 – 26 April 1949
- Langley Ai Force Base, Virginia, 1 September 1950
- Shaw Air Force Base, South Carolina, 8 February 1958 – 31 December 1989

Operated from MacDill Air Force Base, Florida, 22 October-30 November 1962

- Robins Air Force Base, Georgia, 1 October 1996 – 16 February 2023

=== Aircraft ===
- Bell P-39 Airacobra, 1943
- North American P-51 Mustang, 1944–1945, 1946–1947
- North American F-6 Mustang, 1944–1945, 1946–1947
- Lockheed FP-80 Shooting Star (later Lockheed RF-80 Shooting Star), 1947–1949
- Douglas RB-26 Invader, 1950–1955
- Martin RB-57 Canberra, 1954–1956
- Douglas RB-66 Destroyer, 1956–1965
- McDonnell RF-101C Voodoo, 1958–1965
- McDonnell RF-4C Phantom II, 1965–1989
- Martin EB-57E Canberra, 1971–1976
- Northrop Grumman E-8C Joint STARS (1996–September 2022)
