= 766th Bombardment Squadron =

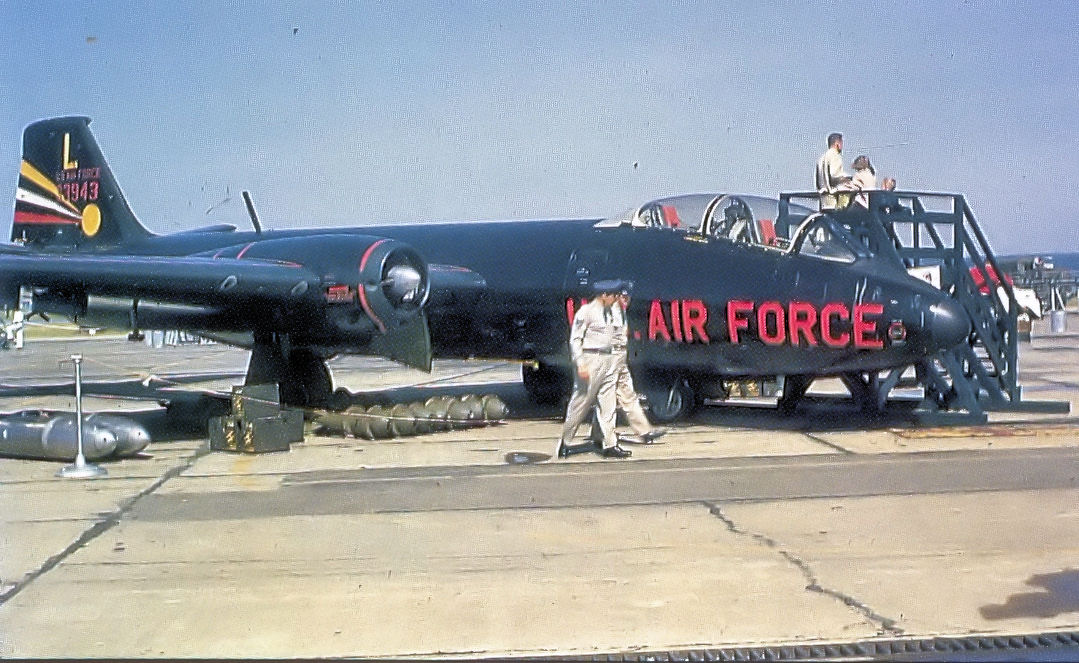
- 461st Bombardment Wing B-57B Canberra (Note: Aircraft is Martin B-57B-MA Canberra, serial 53-3934. This plane was modified as an RB-57B, and later transferred to the Pakistan Air Force and destroyed on the ground by an Indian Air Force English Electric Canberra on 6 December 1971. Baugher, Joe (9 June 2023). "1953 USAF Serial Numbers". Joe Baugher. Photo was taken in 1956.)
- Active: 1943–1945; 1953–1958
- Country: United States
- Branch: United States Air Force
- Role: Bombardment
- Engagements: Mediterranean Theater of Operations
- Decorations: Distinguished Unit Citation

Insignia
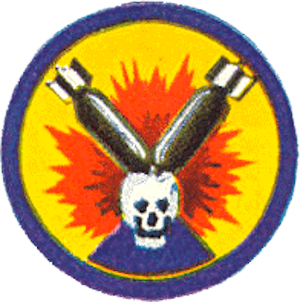
- Patch with 766th Bombardment Squadron emblem (Note: Approved 30 May 1944. Description: On a yellow disc, wide border ultramarine blue, a death's head, proper, affronte, in base, resting on a small ultramarine blue arc segment couped, and supporting two olive drab aerial bombs chevronwise inverted, all in front of a large impact mark light red, center dark red.)

The 766th Bombardment Squadron is an inactive United States Air Force unit. The squadron was first activated during World War II. After training in the United States throughout 1943, it deployed to the Mediterranean Theater of Operations, where it participated in the strategic bombing campaign against Germany, and earned two Distinguished Unit Citations for its actions. Following V-E Day, the squadron returned to the United States, where it was inactivated in August 1945.

The squadron was reactivated at Hill Air Force Base, Utah under Tactical Air Command (TAC) in late 1953, soon becoming one of TAC's first jet bomber squadrons. It moved to Blytheville Air Force Base, Arkansas in 1956 and was inactivated there in January 1958, when Blytheville became a Strategic Air Command (SAC) base.

== History ==
=== World War II ===
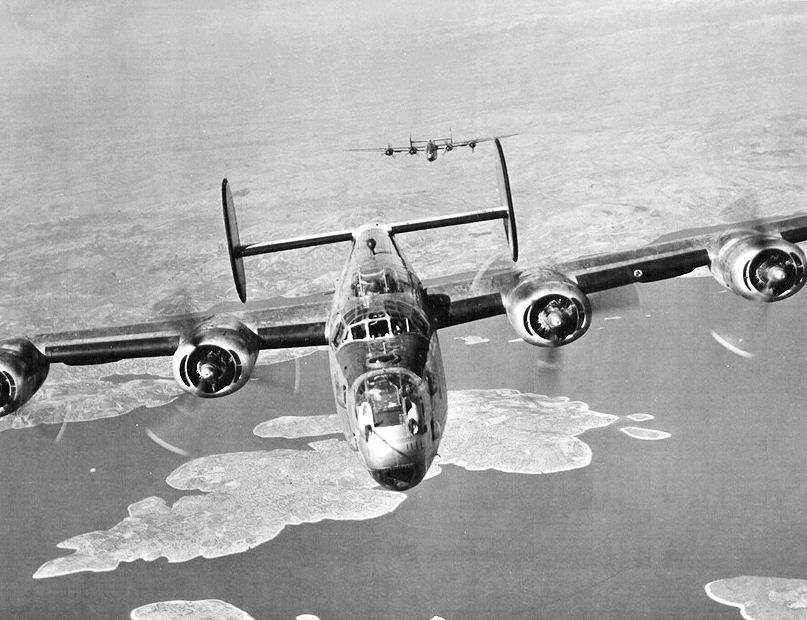
461st Bombardment Group Liberators attacking Muhldorf

The 766th Bombardment Squadron was activated at Wendover Field, Utah on 1 July 1943 as one of the four original squadrons assigned to the 461st Bombardment Group. After training with Consolidated B-24 Liberators under the Second and Fourth Air Forces in the United States, the squadron departed for the Mediterranean Theater of Operations on New Year's Day of 1944.

The squadron arrived at its combat station, Torretto Airfield, Italy by the end of February 1944. The air echelon ferried its Liberators to Italy via the Southern Ferry Route, pausing for additional training in North Africa before joining the ground echelon in Italy. The squadron flew its first combat mission in April 1944.

The squadron was engaged primarily in the strategic bombing campaign against Germany, attacking communications, industrial facilities and other enemy strategic targets in Austria, Czechoslovakia, France, Germany, Greece, Italy, Romania and Yugoslavia. It participated in the campaign against Axis petroleum production with attacks against facilities at Most Czechoslovakia; Blechhammer, Germany; and Moosbierbaum and Vienna in Austria. It received a Distinguished Unit Citation (DUC) for an attack on petroleum facilities at Ploiești, Romania on 15 July 1944, when it heavily damaged its objective, despite clouds and smoke obscuring the target and opposition by flak and interceptors.

it also conducted strategic attacks against enemy airfields and aircraft manufacturing centers. On one of its early missions, it attacked an aircraft component manufacturing facility at Budapest, Hungary, battling its way through enemy air defenses. This attack earned the squadron its first DUC.

The squadron was occasionally diverted from its strategic mission, flying air support and air interdiction missions. During Operation Dragoon, the invasion of southern France in August 1944, it hit artillery positions. The following month it flew airlift missions, transporting supplies to forces in France. Some of its last missions were flown to support Operation Grapeshot, the spring 1945 offensive in northern Italy.

Following V-E Day, the squadron flew supplies to prisoners of war in Austria. It began returning to the United States in early July. It reassembled at Sioux Falls Army Air Field, South Dakota at the end of the month and was inactivated there on 28 August 1945.

=== Tactical bomber operations ===
Prompted by experience in the Korean War, the Air Force decided to increase its air support and air interdiction capabilities to support ground forces in the mid-1950s. As part of this increase, it organized the 461st Bombardment Wing, which included the squadron, at Hill Air Force Base, Utah, in December 1953. The squadron was intended to be a Martin B-57 Canberra unit, but these aircraft were not available, so it was initially equipped with Douglas B-26 Invaders. Officer cadre for the squadron was drawn from 4th Tow Target Squadron at George Air Force Base, California. Facilities at Hill required development and combat readiness training did not begin until July 1954.

After activation, the squadron trained in light bomber operations and participated in exercises, including simulated deployments. In January 1955, the unit began to receive B-57s and was fully equipped by the end of the year. However, Hill's parking and hangar space was inadequate for the B-57s and even as they began to arrive, the unit anticipated a move to Blytheville Air Force Base, Arkansas, which was being developed by the Corps of Engineers for reopening in 1955. In March 1956, the squadron finally moved from Hill to Blytheville.

The conversion to the Canberra brought a number of changes. The new aircraft was subject to several periods of grounding, and the unit faced shortfalls in the number of aircrew available. The unit's mission was also changed several times, with the delivery of tactical nuclear weapons taking priority over conventional weapons delivery, although conventional weapons remained as a secondary mission. The squadron inactivated in January 1958 as Tactical Air Command, under budget pressures, prepared to transfer Blytheville to Strategic Air Command (SAC).

== Lineage ==
- Constituted as the 766th Bombardment Squadron (Heavy) on 19 May 1943

Activated on 1 July 1943
Redesignated 766th Bombardment Squadron, Heavy c. 1944
Inactivated on 28 August 1945

- Redesignated the 766th Bombardment Squadron, Light on 11 December 1953

Activated on 23 December 1953
Redesignated 766th Bombardment Squadron, Tactical on 1 October 1955
Inactivated on 8 January 1958

=== Assignments ===
- 461st Bombardment Group, 1 July 1943 – 28 August 1945
- 461st Bombardment Group, 23 December 1953 – 8 January 1958

=== Stations ===
- Wendover Field, Utah 1 July 1943
- Gowen Field, Idaho, 29 July 1943
- Kearns Army Air Base, Utah 11 September 1943
- Wendover Field, Utah, 30 September 1943
- Hammer Field, California, 30 October 1943 – 1 January 1944
- Venosa Airfield, Italy, c. 18 February 1944
- Torretto Airfield, Italy c. 23 February 1944 – 1 July 1945
- Sioux Falls Army Air Field, South Dakota, 22 July–28 August 1945
- Hill Air Force Base, Utah, 23 December 1953
- Blytheville Air Force Base, Arkansas, 1 March 1956 – 8 January 1958

=== Aircraft ===
- Consolidated B-24 Liberator, 1943–1945
- Douglas B-26 Invader, 1954–1955
- Martin B-57 Canberra, 1955–1958

=== Awards and campaigns ===
| Award streamer | Award | Dates | Notes |
|---|---|---|---|
| | Distinguished Unit Citation | 13 April 1944 | Budapest, Hungary |
| | Distinguished Unit Citation | 15 July 1944 | Ploesti, Romania |

| Campaign Streamer | Campaign | Dates | Notes |
|---|---|---|---|
| | Air Offensive, Europe | c. 18 February 1944 – 5 June 1944 | |
| | Air Combat, EAME Theater | c. 18 February 1944 – 11 May 1945 | |
| | Rome-Arno | c. 18 February – 9 September 1944 | |
| | Central Europe | 22 March 1944 – 21 May 1945 | |
| | Northern France | 25 July 1944 – 14 September 1944 | |
| | Southern France | 15 August 1944 – 14 September 1944 | |
| | North Apennines | 10 September 1944 – 4 April 1945 | |
| | Rhineland | 15 September 1944 – 21 March 1945 | |
| | Po Valley | 3 April 1945 – 8 May 1945 | |

== See also ==
- List of B-57 units of the United States Air Force
- List of A-26 Invader operators
- B-24 Liberator units of the United States Army Air Forces
