= 461st Operations Group =

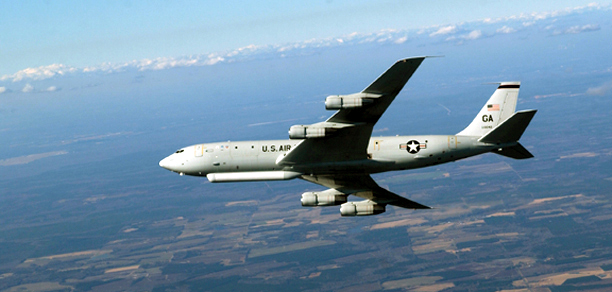
- Wing E-8 JSTARS
- Active: 1943–1945, 1953–1958, 2011–present
- Country: United States
- Branch: United States Air Force
- Role: Air Control
- Part of: Air Combat Command
- Garrison/HQ: Robins Air Force Base
- Nickname: Liberaiders (World War II)
- Motto: Al Ataque (French for 'On the Attack')
- Engagements: Mediterranean Theater of Operations
- Decorations: Distinguished Unit Citation; Air Force Meritorious Unit Award; Air Force Outstanding Unit Award

Insignia
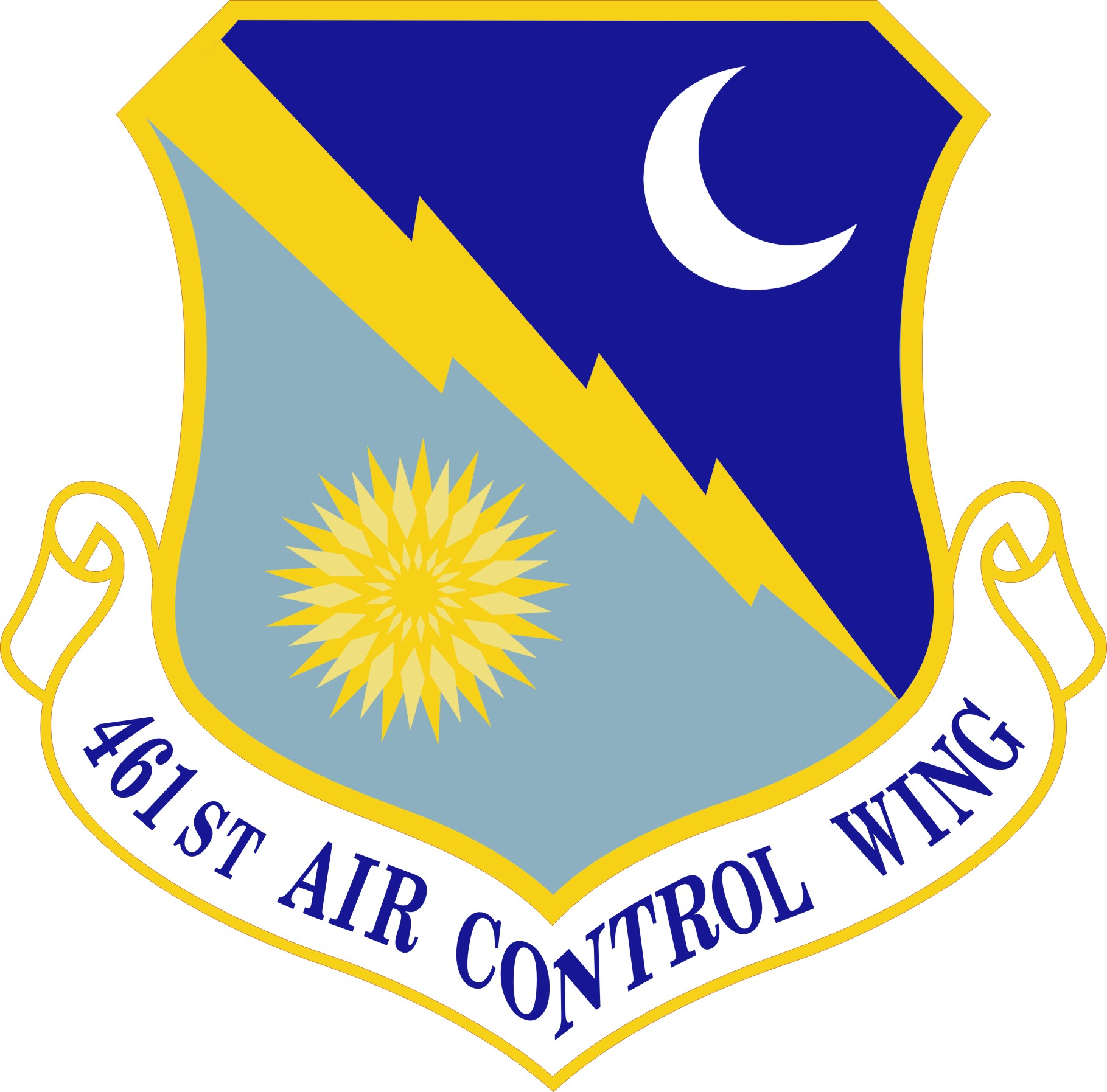
- 461st Operations Group emblem (Note: The group uses the wing emblem with the group designation on the scroll. Air Force Instruction 84-105, Organizational Lineage, Honors and Heraldry, 19 March 2013, para 3.3.3)

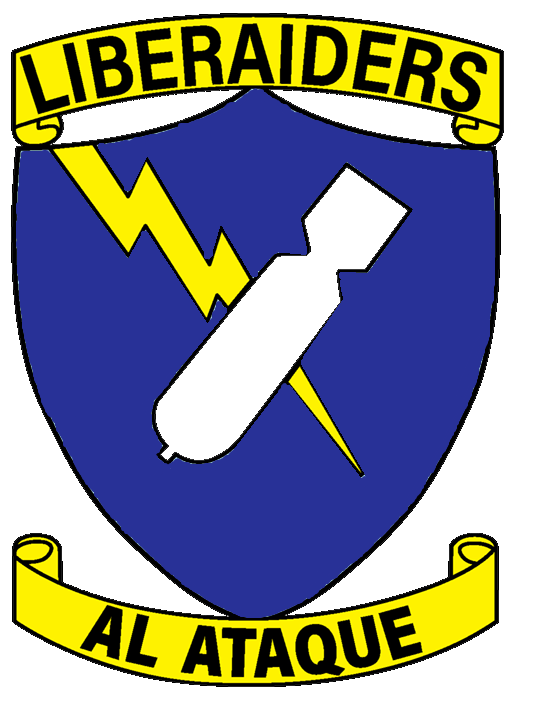
- 461st Bombardment Group emblem(World War II)

The 461st Operations Group is a joint Air Force/Army unit that flew the Northrop Grumman E-8 Joint STARS aircraft until its retirement in 2023. The group is assigned to the 461st Air Control Wing of Air Combat Command and is stationed at Robins Air Force Base, Georgia. It was most recently activated on 1 October 2011.

The group was originally activated in 1943 as the 461st Bombardment Group (Heavy) as a World War II United States Army Air Forces combat organization. The highly decorated unit served primarily in the Mediterranean, African, and The Middle East Theater of World War II.

Later activated as a tactical bomber unit by Tactical Air Command in the 1950s, the group was designated the 461st Bombardment Group, Tactical.

== Mission ==
The 461st Operations Group was the only active duty Air Force unit operating the E-8C Joint Surveillance Target Attack Radar System (Joint STARS), an advanced ground surveillance and battle management system. Joint STARS detects, locates, classifies, tracks and targets ground movements on the battlefield, communicating real-time information through secure data links with U.S. Forces command posts.

== History ==
=== World War II ===
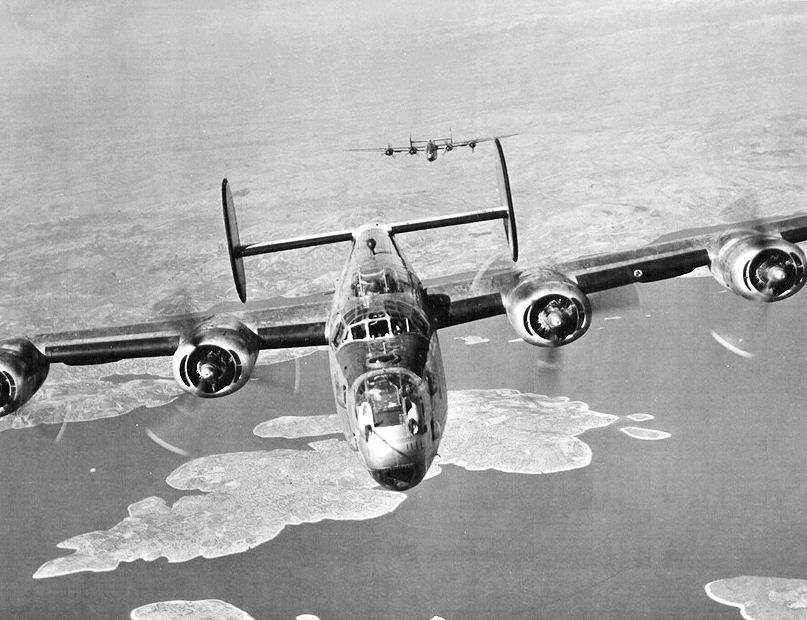
461st Bombardment Group B-24 Liberators attacking Muhldorf Marshalling Yard Germany, 11 March 1945

The group was constituted in May 1943 as a Consolidated B-24 Liberator heavy bombardment group and activated on 1 July at Wendover Field, Utah, with the 764th, 765th, 766th and 767th Bombardment Squadrons assigned. It trained under Second and Fourth Air Forces at several airfields in Utah, Idaho, and California, with group elements undergoing combat simulation training at the Army Air Force School of Applied Tactics in Florida.

The 461st deployed to the Mediterranean Theater of Operations in February 1944, the air echelon flying its B-24's via the South Atlantic route, stopping in North Africa before joining the ground echelon in Italy. It was assigned to the 49th Bombardment Wing of Fifteenth Air Force at Torretto Airfield, Italy, in late February.

The group began combat operations in April, engaging in the strategic bombing campaign against Germany. It engaged chiefly in bombardment of communications, industries, and other strategic objectives in Italy, France, Germany, Czechoslovakia, Hungary, Austria, Romania, Yugoslavia, and Greece. It supported counter-air operations by bombing enemy airdromes and aircraft centers, receiving a Distinguished Unit Citation (DUC) for a mission on 13 April 1944 when the group battled its way through enemy defenses to attack an aircraft components plant in Budapest. The 461st BG conducted Oil Campaign of World War II operations against Brüx, Czechoslovakia; Blechhammer, Germany; and Moosbierbaum and Vienna in Austria. It received a second DUC for a July 1944 bombing of Ploiești despite flak, clouds, smoke, and fighters. Also operated in support of ground forces and flew some interdictory missions.

It hit artillery positions in support of the Operation Dragoon, the invasion of Southern France in August 1944 and flew supply missions to France in September. The group aided Operation Grapeshot, the spring 1945 Allied offensive in Italy, by attacking gun emplacements and troop concentrations. After V-E Day, the 461st dropped supplies to prisoner-of-war camps in Austria during May 1945. During its operations in the Mediterranean, the group suffered 108 aircraft lost in combat, and was credited with the destruction of 129 enemy aircraft. It dropped over 13,000 tons of bombs in over 46,000 hours of combat flying.

The group began returning to the United States in early July. It reassembled at Sioux Falls Army Air Field, South Dakota at the end of the month and was inactivated there on 28 August 1945.

=== Tactical Air Command ===
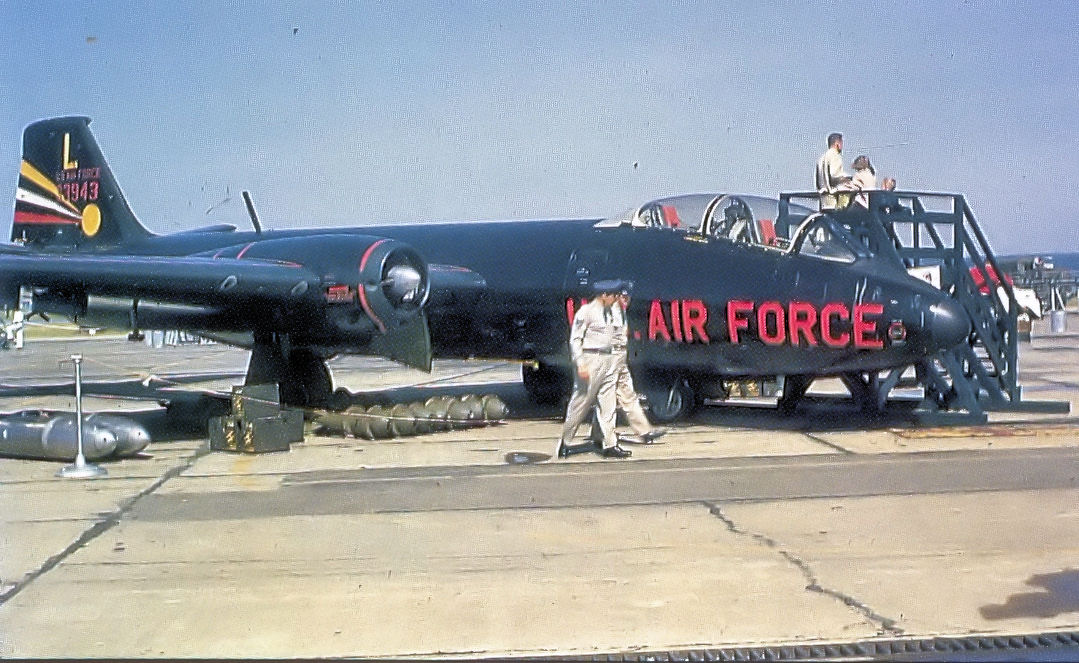
461st Bombardment Wing B-57 Canberra (Note: Aircraft is Martin B-57B-MA Canberra, serial 53-3934, taken in 1956.)

The unit was reactivated as the 461st Bombardment Group, Light and assigned to the 461st Bombardment Wing. It was initially equipped with World War II era Douglas B-26 Invader light bombers. This aircraft assignment was temporary until the unit received jet-powered Martin Martin B-57 Canberras and moved to a permanent base at Blytheville Air Force Base, Arkansas. After three years of service with the B-57s the group was inactivated at the beginning of 1958 as TAC prepared to transfer Blytheville to Strategic Air Command.

=== Joint STARS operations ===
The group was redesignated the 461st Operations Group and activated at Robins Air Force Base, Georgia as the operational element of the 461st Air Control Wing in October 2011. The group operates the Northrop Grumman E-8 Joint STARS along with the associated 116th Operations Group of the Georgia Air National Guard.

== Lineage ==
- Constituted as the 461st Bombardment Group (Heavy) on 19 May 1943

Activated on 1 July 1943
Redesignated 461st Bombardment Group, Heavy in 1944
Inactivated on 18 August 1945

- Redesignated 461st Bombardment Group, Light on 11 December 1953

Activated on 23 December 1953
Redesignated 461st Bombardment Group, Tactical on 1 October 1955
Inactivated on 8 January 1958

- Redesignated 461st Operations Group on 1 September 2011

Activated on 1 October 2011

=== Assignments ===
- Second Air Force, 1 July 1943
- Fourth Air Force, 30 October 1943
- IV Fighter Command, 7 November 1943
- 55th Bombardment Wing, 5 February 1944
- 49th Bombardment Wing, 14 March 1944
- Second Air Force, c. 22 July-28 August 1945
- 461st Bombardment Wing, 23 December 1953 – 8 January 1958
- 461st Air Control Wing, 1 October 2011 – present

=== Components ===
- 12th Airborne Command and Control Squadron: 1 October 2011 – 12 April 2024
- 16th Airborne Command and Control Squadron: 1 October 2011– 16 February 2023
- 53rd Air Traffic Control Squadron (later 53rd Combat Airfield Operations Squadron): 1 October 2014 – present
- 330th Combat Training Squadron: 1 October 2011 – present
- 461st Operations Support Squadron: 1 October 2011 – present
- 764th Bombardment Squadron: 1 July 1943 – 28 August 1945, 23 December 1953 – 8 January 1958
- 765th Bombardment Squadron: 1 July 1943 – 28 August 1945, 23 December 1953 – 8 January 1958
- 766th Bombardment Squadron: 1 July 1943 – 28 August 1945, 23 December 1953 – 8 January 1958
- 767th Bombardment Squadron: 1 July 1943 – 28 August 1945

=== Stations ===
- Wendover Field, Utah 1 July 1943
- Gowen Field, Idaho, 29 July 1943
- Kearns Army Air Field, Utah 11 September 1943
- Wendover Field, Utah, 30 September 1943
- Hammer Field, California, 30 October 1943 – January 1944
- Torretto Airfield, Italy c. 20 February 1944 – July 1945
- Sioux Falls Army Air Field, South Dakota, 22 July – 18 August 1945
- Hill Air Force Base, Utah, 23 December 1953 – 8 April 1956
- Blytheville Air Force Base, Arkansas, 8 April 1956 – 1 April 1958
- Robins Air Force Base, Georgia, 7 October 2011 – present

=== Aircraft ===
- Consolidated B-24 Liberator 1943–1945
- Douglas B-26 Invader 1953–1956
- Douglas C-47 Skytrain 1954–1956
- Martin B-57 Canberra 1955–1958
- Northrop Grumman E-8 Joint STARS

=== Awards and campaigns ===
Award streamer	Award	Dates	Notes
	Distinguished Unit Citation	13 April 1944	Budapest, Hungary 461st Bombardment Group
	Distinguished Unit Citation	15 July 1944	Ploiești, Romania 461st Bombardment Group
	Air Force Meritorious Unit Award	1 October 2011–31 March 2012	461st Operations Group
	Air Force Meritorious Unit Award	1 April 2012–31 May 2013	461st Operations Group
	Air Force Meritorious Unit Award	1 June 2014–31 May 2015	461st Operations Group
	Air Force Meritorious Unit Award	1 June 2015–31 May 2016	461st Operations Group
	Air Force Meritorious Unit Award	1 June 2016–31 May 2017	461st Operations Group
	Air Force Outstanding Unit Award	1 June 2013–31 May 2014	461st Operations Group

Campaign Streamer	Campaign	Dates	Notes
	Air Offensive, Europe	c. 20 February 1944 – 5 June 1944	461st Bombardment Group
	Air Combat, EAME Theater	c. 20 February 1944 – 11 May 1945	461st Bombardment Group
	Rome-Arno	c. 20 February–9 September 1944	461st Bombardment Group
	Central Europe	22 March 1944 – 21 May 1945	461st Bombardment Group
	Normandy	6 June 1944 – 24 July 1944	461st Bombardment Group
	Northern France	25 July 1944 – 14 September 1944	461st Bombardment Group
	Southern France	15 August 1944 – 14 September 1944	461st Bombardment Group
	North Apennines	10 September 1944 – 4 April 1945	461st Bombardment Group
	Rhineland	15 September 1944 – 21 March 1945	461st Bombardment Group
	Po Valley	3 April 1945 – 8 May 1945	461st Bombardment Group
	Global War on Terror Service Medal	1 October 2011–	461st Operations Group
