= 49th Air Division =

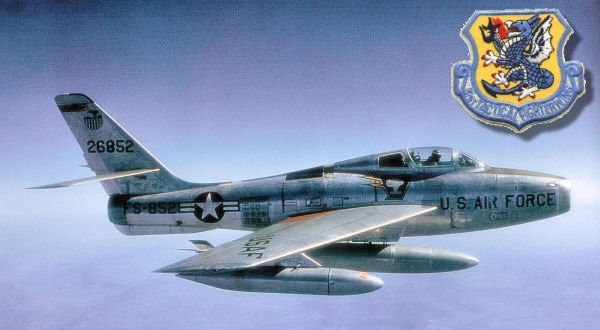
- F-84F Thunderstreakof the division's 81st Fighter-Bomber Wing, about 1955 (Note: Aircraft is Republic F-84F-50-RE Thunderstreak Serial 52-6852 assigned to the 81st Wing's 91st Fighter-Bomber Squadron)
- Active: 1943–1945; 1946–1949; 1951–1956
- Country: United States
- Branch: United States Air Force
- Role: Operational control of tactical forces
- Engagements: Mediterranean Theater of Operations

Insignia
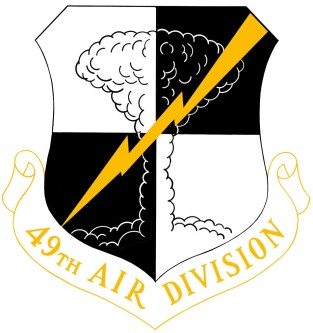
- 49th Air Division emblem (Note: Approved 23 December 1953.)

The 49th Air Division is an inactive United States Air Force unit. Its last assignment was with the United States Air Forces in Europe at RAF Sculthorpe, England. It was inactivated on 1 July 1956.

== History ==
The unit's origins begin with its predecessor, the World War II 49th Bombardment Wing, which was part of Fifteenth Air Force. The 47th engaged in heavy bombardment B-24 Liberator operations against Germany.

=== World War II ===
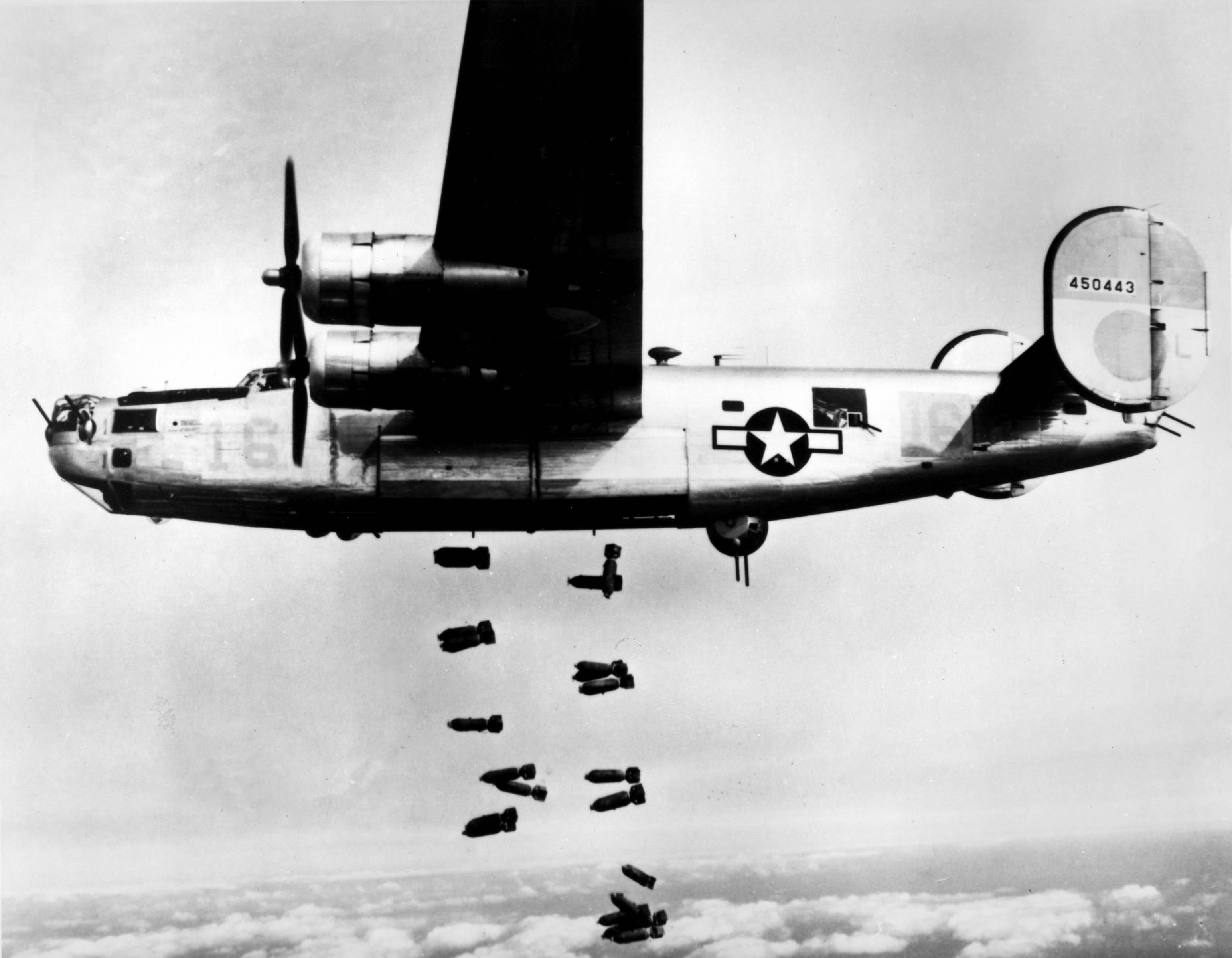
451st Bombardment Group B-24H Liberator (Note: Aircraft is Consolidated B-24H-30-CF Liberator Serial 44-50443 displaying wing markings c. 1945. The upper tail surface and circle were red in color.)

The 49th Air Division was established and activated at Columbia Army Air Base, South Carolina in March 1943 as a medium bomber (North American B-25 Mitchell) operational training wing. It was reassigned to Greenville Army Air Base, South Carolina in April where it commanded training of B-25 bomb groups in the southeast prior to their overseas deployment.

It was decided to redesignate the wing as the 49th Bombardment Wing (Heavy) and prepare it to command Consolidated B-24 Liberator heavy bomb groups as part of Fifteenth Air Force in late 1943. Groups assigned to the wing were the 461st and 484th Bombardment Groups, training at Hammer Field, California and Harvard Army Air Field, Nebraska. After the wing deployed to Bari, Italy in March 1944, a third group, the 451st Bombardment Group, was transferred to the wing from the 47th Bomb Wing.

As part of Fifteenth Air Force the groups of the 49th attacked such targets as oil refineries, marshalling yards, aircraft factories, bridges, and airfields in Italy, Germany, Austria, and Bulgaria. Subordinate units inflicted heavy damage on the oil refineries at Ploiești, participated in the invasion of southern France in August 1944, and supported the final advances of Allied armies in northern Italy in April 1945.

The wing was inactivated in Italy on 16 October 1945.

=== Cold War ===
Beginning in 1947, the 49th served in the Reserve for two years as a B-29 Superfortress organization, during which time it was redesignated as an Air Division. It controlled the 100th Bombardment Group at Miami International Airport and the 380th Bombardment Group at MacDill Air Force Base in Florida.

As a result of the expansion of the United States Air Forces in Europe, the division moved to England to command and control forces there. No combat elements were assigned, but the 20th Fighter-Bomber Wing (RAF Wethersfield); the 47th Bombardment Wing (RAF Sculthorpe) and the 81st Fighter-Bomber Wing at RAF Bentwaters were attached for operations.

The division supervised and participated in numerous training missions such as Quick Shot, Kingpin, and Bear Claw. It was inactivated on 1 July 1956 as a result of a budgetary reduction.

== Lineage ==
- Established as the 49th Bombardment Operational Training Wing (Medium) on 17 March 1943

Activated on 31 March 1943
Redesignated 49th Bombardment Wing (Medium) on 18 October 1943
Redesignated 49th Bombardment Wing (Heavy) on 4 December 1943
Redesignated 49th Bombardment Wing, Heavy c. August 1944
Inactivated on 16 October 1945

- Activated in the Reserve as 49th Bombardment Wing, Very Heavy on 20 December 1946

Redesignated 49th Air Division, Bombardment on 16 April 1948
Inactivated on 27 June 1949

- Redesignated 49th Air Division on 25 October 1951

Activated on 7 November 1951
Redesignated 49th Air Division, Operational on 1 April 1952
Redesignated 49th Air Division (Operational) on 15 November 1954
Inactivated on 1 July 1956

=== Assignments ===
- Third Air Force, 31 March 1943 – c. 3 February 1944
- Army Service Forces, Port of Embarkation, c. 3 February 1944;
- Fifteenth Air Force, c. 11 March 1944 – 16 October 1945
- Fourteenth Air Force, 20 December 1946
- Ninth Air Force, 22 December 1948
- Fourteenth Air Force, 1 February – 27 June 1949
- Tactical Air Command, 7 November 1951
- Third Air Force, 5 June 1952 – 1 July 1956

=== Components ===
Wings

- 20th Fighter-Bomber Wing: attached 12 February 1952 – 1 July 1956
- 47th Bombardment Wing: attached 12 February 1952 – 1 July 1956
- 81st Fighter-Interceptor Wing (later 81st Fighter-Bomber Wing): attached 1 March 1954 – 1 July 1956

Groups

- 100th Bombardment Group: 29 May 1947 – 27 June 1949
- 380th Bombardment Group: 17 October 1947 – 27 June 1949
- 451st Bombardment Group: c. 6 April 1944 – c.19 June 1945
- 461st Bombardment Group: c. 30 April 1944 – c.1 July 1945
- 484th Bombardment Group: c. 6 April 1944 – c.25 May 1945

=== Stations ===
- Columbia Army Air Base, South Carolina, 31 March 1943
- Greenville Army Air Base, South Carolina, c. 28 April 1943 – 2 February 1944
- Bari, Italy, 9 March 1944
- Naples, Italy, 9 April 1944
- Incoronata, Italy, c. 11 April 1944 – 16 October 1945
- Miami Army Air Field (later Miami International Airport), Florida, 20 December 1946 – 27 June 1949
- Langley Air Force Base, Virginia, 7 November 1951 – 21 May 1952
- RAF Sculthorpe, England, 1 June 1952 – 1 July 1956

=== Aircraft ===
- Consolidated B-24 Liberator 1944 – 1945
- Republic F-84 Thunderjet 1952 – 1956
- North American B-45 Tornado 1954 – 1956
- North American RB-45 Tornado 1954 – 1956
