= 84th Radar Evaluation Squadron =

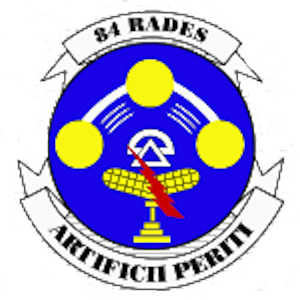
- Emblem of the 84th Radar Evaluation Squadron
- Active: 1954-Present
- Country: United States
- Branch: United States Air Force
- Type: Radar evaluation and testing

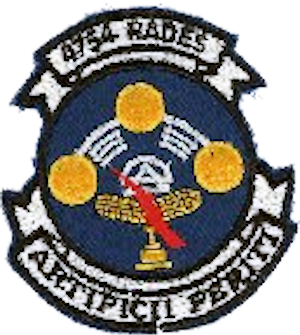
Legacy unit emblem

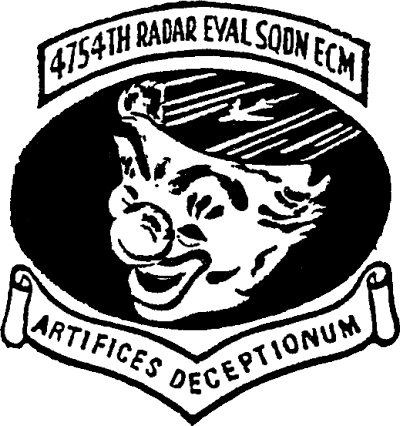
Legacy unit emblem

The 84th Radar Evaluation Squadron is a component of the 505th Test and Training Group, 505th Command and Control Wing, Air Combat Command, located at Hurlburt Field, Florida. The squadron provides the Warfighter responsive worldwide radar-centric planning, optimization, and constant evaluation to create the most sensitive integrated radar picture.

== Overview ==
The 84 RADES provides expert assistance to multiple government entities: from radar coverage studies to crucial assistance for search and rescue coordination centers. It insures that tactical and strategic air defense ground radars, C2 systems, and electronic resources are installed, maintained, and operated in a high state of readiness to provide a quick reaction to the threat of both limited and general wars.

The squadron also regularly provides assistance to the USAF Safety Center, US Navy Safety Center, and National Transportation Safety Board. The Radar Data Interface System (RDIS), designed and built by 84 RADES engineers and present at all Air Defense Sectors and Alaska, drives our Event Analysis (EA) process. EA is a post-event investigation of aerial mishaps that has provided a unique and sometimes crucial perspective on a high number of military and civilian aircraft incidents.

== History ==
The squadron was activated by Air Defense Command (ADC) in 1952 as the provisional 4754th Radar Evaluation Electronics Counter-Countermeasure Flight, assigned to the Western Air Defense Force (WADF) at Hamilton AFB, California. The mission was to provide Electronic Counter-Measure (ECM) training and evaluation services to the various Aircraft Control and Warning Squadrons of WADF.

In order to provide the necessary training for WADF, the 4754th was assigned six B-29 Superfortresses, three B-25 Mitchells, and one C-47. The B-29s and B-25s contained an assortment of jamming devices to provide the required ECM and the C-47 was used as a support aircraft to ferry personnel and equipment. During the period that the 4754th operated these aircraft, they provided the operators of the WADF with thousands of hours of ECM training. By 1958, the size of the unit was increased to 59 officers and 206 airmen – a growth of 58% in four years. Effective 8 July 1958, the ADC re-designated the unit as the 4754th Radar Evaluation Squadron (ECM).

By 1959 the World War II aircraft were very expensive to operate, needing excessive amounts of maintenance to remain airworthy and not supportable due to a lack of spare parts. The squadron's aircraft were retired and the squadron was moved to Hill AFB, Utah. The unit was given sole responsibility for providing evaluation services to all AC&W type radars and radar systems throughout North America. The squadron was initially placed under Central Air Defense Force (CADF), but transferred shortly afterward to ADC’s 29th Air Division in 1960 and then the 28th Air Division in 1961 as a result of ADC reorganizations.

For the next 14 years, the unit evaluated all long-range air defense radar facilities, standardized evaluation processes, and developed new evaluation technologies. During this time, the command of the squadron was transferred to ADC's 4th Air Force in 1966 and to ADCOM Headquarters in 1969. The unit’s exemplary performance was noted in 1968 when it received its first of 21 Outstanding Unit Awards.

By 1975, the unit had been given the responsibility for Pacific (PACAF) and European (USAFE) radars, making it the only ground-based radar evaluation unit in the Department of Defense.

In 1979 as part of the inactivation of Aerospace Defense Command, the unit was re-designated the 1954th Radar Evaluation Squadron, and was transferred to the Air Force Communications Command, then headquartered at Richards-Gebaur Air Force Base, Missouri.

The squadron was designated 84th Radar Evaluation Squadron in 1987 and was transferred to Tactical Air Command, and in 1992 it became part of the newly formed Air Combat Command, following TAC’s inactivation.

The RADES maintained its alignment under the USAF Warfare Center until 1993, when they became part of the 505th Command and Control Evaluation Group. In July 1998, the unit became a charter member of the newly formed Air Combat Command Communications Group, based at Langley AFB, VA. Finally, in October 2005, the 84th RADES returned to the USAF Warfare Center, under the 505th Command and Control Wing and 505th Operations Group based in Hurlburt Field, Florida.

=== Lineage ===
- Activated as 4754th Radar Evaluation Electronics Counter-Countermeasure Flight, 25 January 1954

Re-designated: 4754th Radar Evaluation Flight, ECM, 1 October 1957
Re-designated: 4754th Radar Evaluation Squadron, 8 July 1958
Re-designated: 4754th Radar Evaluation Squadron (Technical), 1 July 1960
Re-designated: 1954th Radar Evaluation Squadron, 1 October 1979
Re-designated: 84th Radar Evaluation Squadron, 1 July 1987

=== Assignments ===
- Western Air Defense Force, 25 January 1954
- Central Air Defense Force, 1 September 1959
- 29th Air Division, 1 January 1960
- 28th Air Division, 1 July 1961
- Fourth Air Force, 1 April 1966
- Aerospace Defense Command, 1 March 1969
- Air Force Communications Command, 1 October 1979
- USAF Air Warfare Center, 1 July 1987
- 505th Command and Control Evaluation Group, 15 April 1993
- Air Combat Command Communications Group, 15 September 1998
- 505th Operations Group, 1 October 2005 – Present

=== Stations ===
- Hamilton AFB, California, 25 January 1954
- Hill AFB, Utah, 1 September 1959 – Present

=== Aircraft ===
- B-29 Superfortress 1957-1959
- B-25 Mitchell, 1957–1959
- C-47 Skytrain, 1957–1959

== See also ==
- List of United States Air Force defense systems evaluation squadrons
