= 4758th Defense Systems Evaluation Squadron =

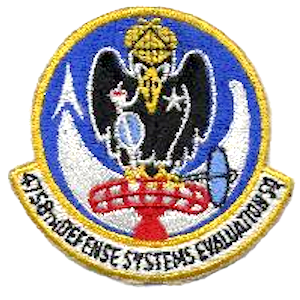
- Emblem of the 4758th Defense Systems Evaluation Squadron
- Active: 1962-1970
- Country: United States
- Branch: United States Air Force
- Type: Radar evaluation and testing

The 4758th Defense Systems Evaluation Squadron is a discontinued United States Air Force unit. It was last assigned to the 26th Air Division of Aerospace Defense Command at Holloman Air Force Base, New Mexico, where it was inactivated on 31 October 1970.

== History ==
=== World War II ===
The 4758th Defense Systems Evaluation Squadron started life at Biggs Air Force Base, Texas in 1962. On 1 June 1962 the squadron was organized by Air Defense Command, as the 4758th Defense Systems Evaluation Squadron flying the EB-57E Canberra, and F-100C and F-100F jet aircraft.

Biggs was transferred to the Army in April 1966 and the squadron moved to Holloman Air Force Base, New Mexico, where it became a tenant of Air Force Systems Command. At Holloman the squadron operated as was administratively and logistically supported by the 6580th Air Base Group, Air Force Systems Command. The unit continued its training mission with the EB-57Es, and F-100s. It additionally provided training and assistance to Army anti-aircraft missile units at the White Sands Missile Range. It was discontinued on 31 October 1970, due to budget reductions. Some of its personnel and aircraft were reassigned to the 4677th Defense Systems Evaluation Squadron at Hill Air Force Base, Utah.

=== Lineage ===
- Designated by Air Defense Command as the 4758th Defense Systems Evaluation Squadron and organized on 1 June 1962

Discontinued on 31 October 1970

=== Assignments ===
- 4752d Air Defense Wing, 1 July 1962
- 32d Air Division, 1 September 1962
- 29th Air Division, 25 June 1963
- Fourteenth Air Force, 1 April 1966
- Tenth Air Force, 1 July 1968
- 27th Air Division, 15 November 1969 – 31 October 1970

=== Stations ===
- Biggs AFB, Texas, 1 July 1962
- Holloman AFB, New Mexico, 8 April 1966 – 31 October 1970

=== Aircraft ===
- EB-57E Canberra, 1958–1979
- F-100C & F-100F aircraft

== See also ==
- List of United States Air Force defense systems evaluation squadrons
