= List of United States Air Force defense systems evaluation squadrons =

This is a list of United States Air Force defense systems evaluation squadrons. It covers units that were part of the inactivated Aerospace Defense Command (ADCOM) and serves as a break out of the comprehensive List of United States Air Force squadrons.

Squadron	Shield	Location	Nickname	Aircraft	Note
17th Defense Systems Evaluation Squadron		Malmstrom AFB		EB-57	Activated in 1954 as 4677th Radar Evaluation Flight at Hill AFB, Utah; then re-designated 4677th DSES, 1 Jan 1960 unit 1 July 1974 then re-designated the 17th DSES until inactivation 13 July 1979.
4713th Defense Systems Evaluation Squadron		Westover AFB	"Roving Ravens"	EB-57	Activated in 1954 as 4713th Radar Evaluation Flight at Griffiss AFB, New York.
4754th Radar Evaluation Squadron		Hamilton AFB		TB-29; TB-25	Became non-flying organization in 1959. Still active as 84th Radar Evaluation Squadron, stationed at Hill AFB, UT as part of ACC.
4758th Defense Systems Evaluation Squadron		Holloman AFB		F-100; EB-57	Origins date to 1939 as the 129th Observation Squadron.
6023d Radar Evaluation Squadron		Yokota AB; Johnson AB; Naha AB		ECM TB-29 Superfortress	Operated under Far East Air Forces (Later Pacific Air Forces) Was last unit equipped with B-29 Superfortresses; last flight on 21 June 1960.

== See also ==
- List of United States Air Force squadrons
