= 767th Bombardment Squadron =

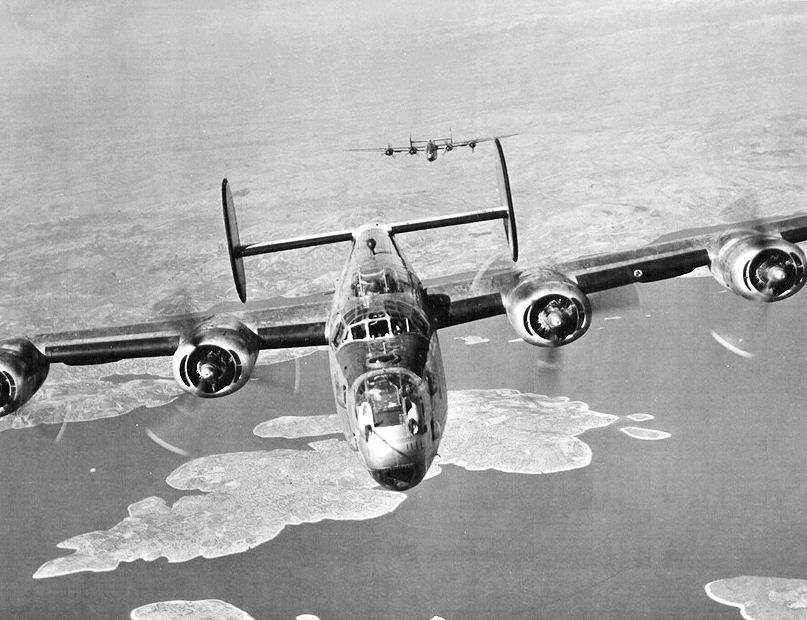
- 461st Bombardment Group Liberators attacking Muhldorf
- Active: 1943–1945
- Country: United States
- Branch: United States Air Force
- Role: Bombardment
- Engagements: Mediterranean Theater of Operations
- Decorations: Distinguished Unit Citation

Insignia
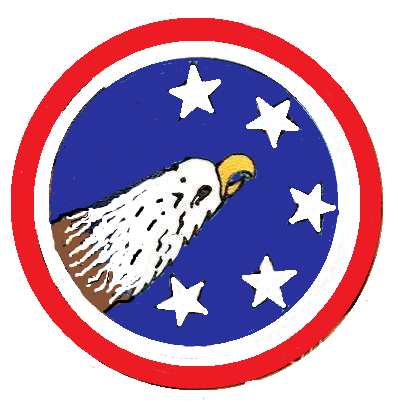
- 767th Bombardment Squadron emblem (Note: Approved 8 August 1944. Description: On a dark blue disc, border dark red, piped white the head of an American eagle proper, issuing from dexter base, within an orle of five white stars.)

The 767th Bombardment Squadron is a former United States Army Air Forces unit. The squadron was activated on 1 July 1943. After training in the United States, in early 1944 it deployed to the Mediterranean Theater of Operations, where it participated in the strategic bombing campaign against Germany, and earned two Distinguished Unit Citations for its actions. Following V-E Day, the squadron returned to the United States, where it was inactivated on 18 August 1945.

== History ==
The 767th Bombardment Squadron was activated at Wendover Field, Utah on 1 July 1943 as one of the four squadrons originally assigned to the 461st Bombardment Group. After training with Consolidated B-24 Liberators under Second and Fourth Air Forces in the United States, the squadron departed for the Mediterranean Theater of Operations on New Year's Day of 1944.

The squadron arrived at its combat station, Torretto Airfield, Italy by the end of February 1944. The air echelon ferried its Liberators to Italy via the Southern Ferry Route, pausing for additional training in North Africa before joining the ground echelon in Italy. The squadron flew its first combat mission in April 1944.

The squadron was engaged primarily in the strategic bombing campaign against Germany, attacking communications, industrial facilities and other enemy strategic targets in Austria, Czechoslovakia, France, Germany, Greece, Italy, Romania and Yugoslavia. It participated in the campaign against Axis petroleum production with attacks against facilities at Most Czechoslovakia; Blechhammer, Germany; and Moosbierbaum and Vienna in Austria. It received a Distinguished Unit Citation (DUC) for an attack on petroleum facilities at Ploiești, Romania on 15 July 1944, when it heavily damaged its objective, despite clouds and smoke obscuring the target and opposition by flak and interceptors.

it also conducted strategic attacks against enemy airfields and aircraft manufacturing centers. On one of its early missions, it attacked an aircraft component manufacturing facility at Budapest, Hungary, battling its way through enemy air defenses. This attack earned the squadron its first DUC.

The squadron was occasionally diverted from its strategic mission, flying air support and air interdiction missions. During Operation Dragoon, the invasion of southern France in August 1944, it hit artillery positions. The following month it flew airlift missions, transporting supplies to forces in France. Some of its last missions were flown to support Operation Grapeshot, the spring 1945 offensive in northern Italy.

Following V-E Day, the squadron flew supplies to prisoners of war in Austria. It began returning to the United States in early July. It reassembled at Sioux Falls Army Air Field, South Dakota at the end of the month and was inactivated there on 28 August 1945.

== Lineage ==
- Constituted as the 767th Bombardment Squadron (Heavy) on 19 May 1943

Activated on 1 July 1943
Redesignated 767th Bombardment Squadron, Heavy c. 1944
Inactivated on 28 August 1945

=== Assignments ===
- 461st Bombardment Group, 1 July 1943 – 28 August 1945

=== Stations ===
- Wendover Field, Utah 1 July 1943
- Gowen Field, Idaho, 29 July 1943
- Kearns Army Air Base, Utah 11 September 1943
- Wendover Field, Utah, 30 September 1943
- Hammer Field, California, 30 October 1943 – 1 January 1944
- Venosa Airfield, Italy, c. 18 February 1944
- Torretto Airfield, Italy c. 23 February 1944 – 1 July 1945
- Sioux Falls Army Air Field, South Dakota, 22 July–28 August 1945

=== Aircraft ===
- Consolidated B-24 Liberator, 1943–1945

=== Awards and campaigns ===
Award streamer	Award	Dates	Notes
	Distinguished Unit Citation	13 April 1944	Budapest, Hungary
	Distinguished Unit Citation	15 July 1944	Ploesti, Romania

Campaign Streamer	Campaign	Dates	Notes
	Air Offensive, Europe	c. 18 February 1944 – 5 June 1944	
	Air Combat, EAME Theater	c. 18 February 1944 – 11 May 1945	
	Rome-Arno	c. 18 February–9 September 1944	
	Central Europe	22 March 1944 – 21 May 1945	
	Normandy	6 June 1944 – 24 July 1944	
	Northern France	25 July 1944 – 14 September 1944	
	Southern France	15 August 1944 – 14 September 1944	
	North Apennines	10 September 1944 – 4 April 1945	
	Rhineland	15 September 1944 – 21 March 1945	
	Po Valley	3 April 1945 – 8 May 1945	

== See also ==
- B-24 Liberator units of the United States Army Air Forces
