= Montreuil Airfield =

Montreuil Airfield Advanced Landing Ground (ALG) A-38

- Centre Region, France Montreuil Airfield (France)

Site information
- Type: Military airfield
- Controlled by: United States Army Air Forces

Location
- Coordinates: 48°05′29″N 000°11′16″E

Site history
- Built by: IX Engineering Command
- In use: September–October 1944
- Materials: Prefabricated Hessian Surfacing (PHS)
- Battles/wars: Western Front (World War II); Eastern France/Benelux Campaign

Montreuil Airfield is an abandoned World War II military airfield, which is located near the commune of La Bazoge in the Pays de la Loire region of northern France.

Located just outside Montreuil (probably to the north of the town), the United States Army Air Force established a temporary airfield on 17 August 1944, shortly after the Allied landings in France. The airfield was constructed by the IX Engineering Command, 820th Engineer Aviation Battalion.

== History ==
Known as Advanced Landing Ground "A-38", the airfield consisted of a single 5000' (1500m) prefabricated hessian surfacing/compressed earth runway (3600 PHS/1400 ETH) aligned 01/19. Tents were used for billeting and also for support facilities. An access road was built to the existing road infrastructure. There were a dump for supplies, ammunition, and gasoline drums, along with a drinkable water and minimal electrical grid for communications and station lighting.

The 363d Tactical Reconnaissance Group based a variety of reconnaissance aircraft at Montreuil from 4 September to 4 October 1944.

After the Americans moved east into Central France with the advancing Allied armies, the airfield was closed on 5 October 1944. Today the long dismantled airfield is indistinguishable from the agricultural fields in the area.

== See also ==
- Advanced Landing Ground
