= 4713th Defense Systems Evaluation Squadron =

Inactive United States Air Force unit

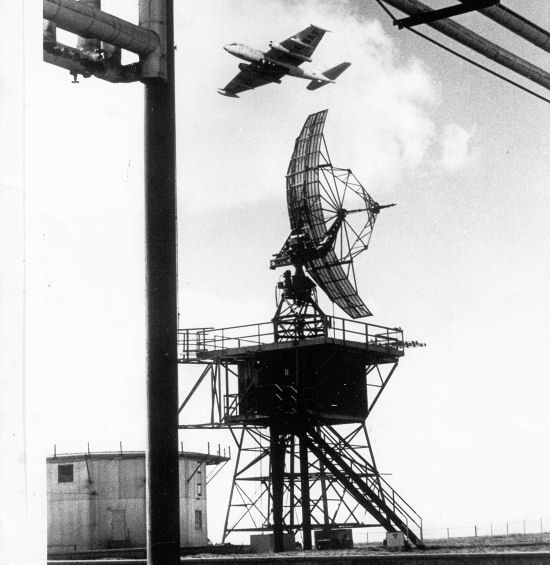
- Squadron B-57E Canberra flying over a General Electric AN/FPS-6 Radar
- Active: 1954–1974
- Country: United States
- Branch: United States Air Force
- Role: Radar evaluation and testing
- Nickname(s): The Roving Raavens
- Decorations: Air Force Outstanding Unit Award

Insignia
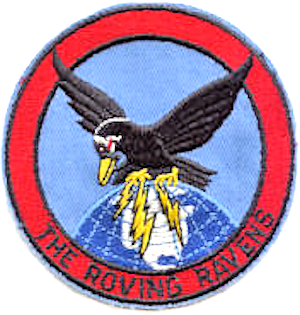
- Patch with 4713th Defense Systems Evaluation Squadron emblem

The 4713th Defense Systems Evaluation Squadron is an inactive United States Air Force unit. It was last assigned to the 21st Air Division at Westover Air Force Base, Massachusetts, where it was inactivated on 15 April 1974. The squadron was first organized as the 4713th Radar Evaluation Flight at Griffiss Air Force Base, New york in March 1954 and expanded to a squadron in 1958. It began flying Martin B-57 Canberra aircraft in 1959, and continued to do so in the role of testing air defense systems until inactivating,

== History ==
The squadron was organized as the 4713th Radar Evaluation Flight at Griffiss Air Force Base, New York in March 1954, assigned to Eastern Air Defense Force and equipped with Boeing B-29 Superfortresses. The primary mission of the squadron was to provide electronic countermeasure (ECM) training and evaluation services to Air Defense Command's (ADC) aircraft control and warning squadrons. It also had a mobilization mission to provide electronic warfare support to combatant commands.

The squadron soon added the TB-29 model of the Superfortress, and some North American TB-25 Mitchells to its strength. The B-29s and B-25s contained an assortment of radar jamming devices to provide the required ECM and a Douglas C-47 Skytrain was used as a support aircraft to ferry personnel and equipment. During the period that the 4713th operated these aircraft, they provided the operators at ADC radar squadrons with thousands of hours of ECM training. On 8 July 1958, ADC expanded the flight to a squadron.

In August 1959, the squadron moved to Stewart Air Force Base, New York. By this time the World War II aircraft flown by the squadron were becoming expensive to operate, needing excessive amounts of maintenance to remain airworthy suffering from a lack of spare parts. At Stewart, the squadron began to equip with the Martin B-57 Canberra, originally developed as a medium bomber, but which was being phased out in favor of the North American F-100 Super Sabre. Some of these B-57s were reassigned to the squadron to replace the B-29s and B-25s.

In addition to the ECM training for Radar Sites, the B-57s could operate at altitudes over 40,000 feet and train fighter interceptor squadrons. Exercises were conducted with North American F-86D Sabre, Lockheed F-94C Starfire, and Northrop F-89D Scorpions. Later, the B-57Es were adapted to ECM and faker target aircraft against Convair F-102 Delta Dagger and Convair F-106 Delta Dart interceptors. Following a new electronics fit in the 1960s, the B-57Es were redesignated EB-57E. These specially-equipped EB-57Es were operated until 1974 when the squadron was inactivated.

As Stewart was being transferred to the United States Army, the squadron moved to Otis Air Force Base, Massachusetts in December 1969. However, its stay at Otis was short, as Otis was being turned over to the Massachusetts Air National Guard and the squadron moved again to Westover Air Force Base, Massachusetts, a Strategic Air Command base in September 1972. However, in May 1974, Westover was transferred to the Air Force Reserve. The reserves were not funded or manned to support regular units on their installations, and the decision was made to inactivate the squadron in April.

== Lineage ==
- Designated as the 4713th Radar Evaluation Flight (ECM) and organized on 18 March 1954

Redesignated 4713th Radar Evaluation Squadron, ECM on 8 July 1958
Redesignated 4713th Defense Systems Evaluation Squadron on 1 January 1960
Inactivated 15 April 1974

=== Assignments ===
- Eastern Air Defense Force, 18 March 1954
- 26th Air Division, 1 July 1959
- 4063d Air Base Group, 20 October 1959
- First Air Force, 1 January 1960
- Aerospace Defense Command, 1 December 1969
- 21st Air Division, 2 October 1972 – 15 April 1974

=== Stations ===
- Griffiss Air Force Base, New York, 18 March 1954
- Stewart Air Force Base, New York, 1 August 1959
- Otis Air Force Base, Massachusetts, 1 December 1969
- Westover Air Force Base, Massachusetts, 15 September 1972 – 15 April 1974

=== Aircraft ===
- Boeing B-29 Superfortress, 1954–1959
- Boeing TB-29 Superfortress, c. 1954–1959
- North American TB-25 Mitchell, c. 1954–1959
- Martin B-57B Canberra (later EB-57B), 1959-1974
- Martin B-57E (later EB-57E) Canberra, 1959-1974

== See also ==
- List of United States Air Force defense systems evaluation squadrons
