= Andrew E. Busch =

U.S. military officer

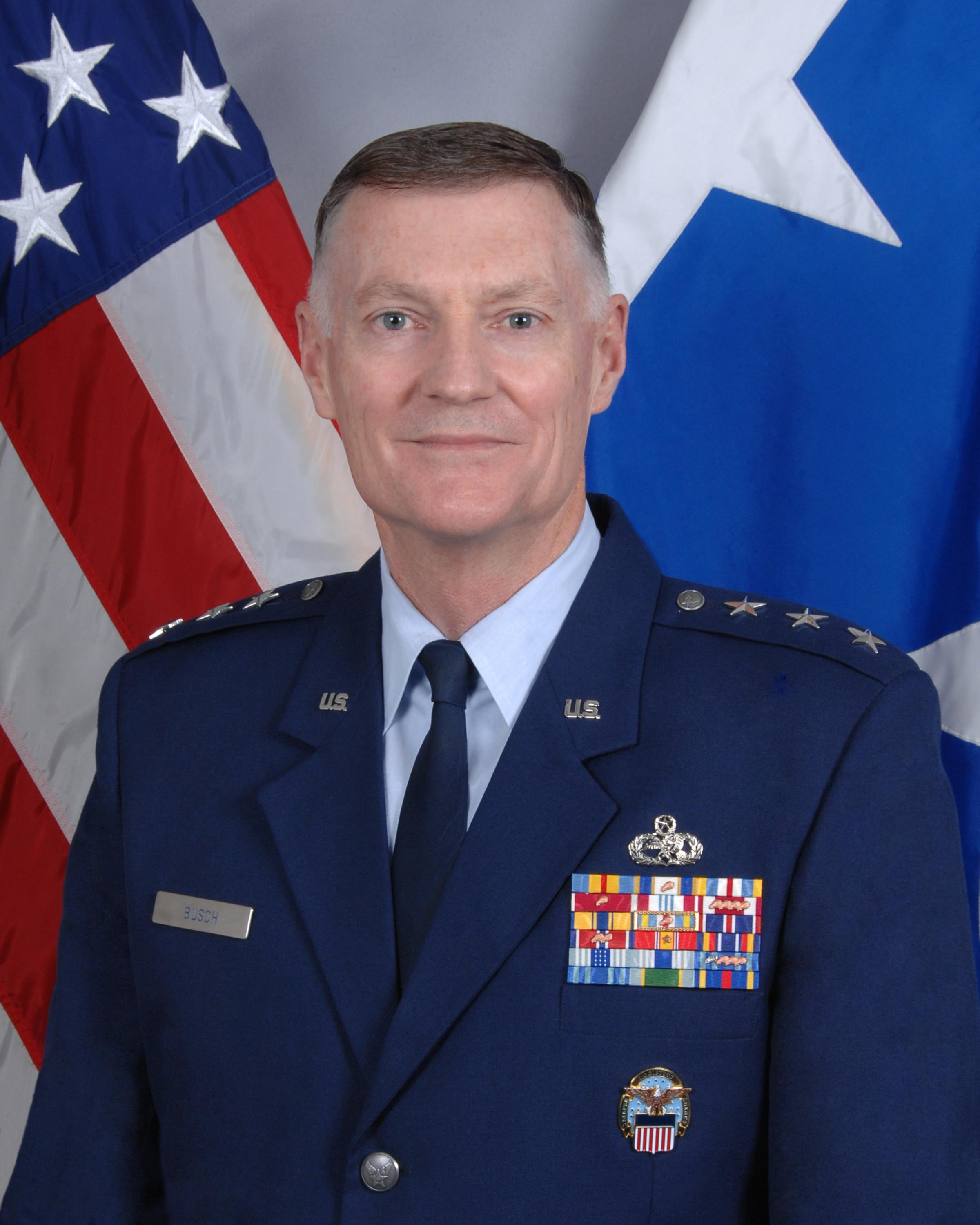
- Military career
- Allegiance: United States
- Branch: United States Air Force
- Service years: 1979–2017
- Rank: Lieutenant General
- Commands: Defense Logistics Agency; Ogden Air Logistics Center; Defense Supply Center, Richmond; 402nd Maintenance Wing; 3rd Equipment Maintenance Squadron; 432nd Maintenance Squadron
- Awards: Defense Distinguished Service Medal; Air Force Distinguished Service Medal (2); Defense Superior Service Medal; Legion of Merit (2)

Andrew E. Busch is a retired lieutenant general in the United States Air Force, who previously served as the director of the Defense Logistics Agency, in Fort Belvoir, Virginia, from 2014 until 2017. Busch was responsible for logistics services to all branches of the United States Armed Forces, including spare parts, medical supplies, uniforms, food, and fuel. He oversaw a workforce of over 24,000 military and civilian personnel located in 48 states and 28 countries.

== Education ==
Busch received his Bachelor of Science degree from the United States Air Force Academy in 1979. He then attended Golden Gate University and received his Master of Public Administration degree in 1981. In 1985, he attended the Squadron Officer School in Maxwell Air Force Base. In 1990, Busch earned a Master of Science degree in logistics management at the Air Force Institute of Technology, Wright-Patterson Air Force Base, Ohio. In 1995, he was awarded a Master of Science degree in national resource strategy from the Industrial College of the Armed Forces, Fort Lesley J. McNair in the District of Columbia. In 2005, Busch attended the Leadership for a Democratic Society program at the Federal Executive Institute in Charlottesville, Virginia.

== Assignments ==
Busch had the following assignments during his career:

- August 1979 – December 1979, student, Aircraft Maintenance Officers Course, Chanute Air Force Base, Illinois
- December 1979 – January 1983, F-4D and F-16A/B aircraft maintenance officer, 474th Tactical Fighter Wing, Nellis Air Force Base, Nevada
- January 1983 – June 1986, assistant professor of aerospace studies and recruiting officer, AFROTC Detachment 400, Michigan Technological University, Houghton, Michigan
- June 1986 – May 1989, F-117 maintenance supervisor, 4450th Tactical Group, Tonopah Test Range, Nevada
- May 1989 – October 1990, student, Air Force Institute of Technology, Wright-Patterson Air Force Base, Ohio
- October 1990 – August 1993, commander of 432nd Component Repair Squadron and 432nd Maintenance Squadron; and Chief of Maintenance, 13th Fighter Squadron, Misawa Air Base, Japan
- August 1993 – July 1994, commander of 3rd Equipment Maintenance Squadron, Elmendorf Air Force Base, Alaska
- July 1994 – June 1995, student, Industrial College of the Armed Forces, Fort Lesley J. McNair, District of Columbia
- June 1995 – January 1998, chief of Weapons System Readiness Teams, and executive officer, Materiel Management, Headquarters Defense Logistics Agency, Fort Belvoir, Virginia
- January 1998 – March 2000, deputy director for Logistics Management and Director for Workload Transfer, Ogden Air Logistics Complex, Hill Air Force Base, Utah
- March 2000 – June 2002, Chief of Propulsion Management Division, and Chief, Engine Production Division, Oklahoma City Air Logistics Complex, Tinker Air Force Base, Oklahoma
- June 2002 – August 2005, deputy director for Logistics Operations, Directorate of Logistics and Sustainment, Headquarters Air Force Materiel Command, Wright-Patterson Air Force Base, Ohio
- August 2005 – June 2007, commander, 402d Maintenance Wing, Warner Robins Air Logistics Complex, Robins Air Force Base, Georgia
- June 2007 – June 2009, commander, Defense Supply Center, Richmond, Richmond, Virginia
- July 2009 – July 2012, commander of Ogden Air Logistics Center, Hill Air Force Base, Utah
- July 2012 – December 2015, vice commander of Headquarters Air Force Materiel Command, Wright-Patterson Air Force Base, Ohio
- December 2014 – May 2017, director, Defense Logistics Agency, Fort Belvoir, Virginia

== Awards and decorations ==
Busch has been awarded these major awards and decorations:

Defense Distinguished Service Medal
Air Force Distinguished Service Medal with one bronze oak leaf cluster
Defense Superior Service Medal
Legion of Merit with one bronze oak leaf cluster
Defense Meritorious Service Medal
Meritorious Service Medal with four oak leaf clusters
Air Force Commendation Medal
Joint Meritorious Unit Award with one bronze oak leaf cluster
