= GFR =

GFR may refer to:

- Gas-cooled fast reactor
- Gefreiter
- General fertility rate
- Glomerular filtration rate
- Government Flight Representative
- Grand Forks Railway, a Canadian railway
- Grand Funk Railroad, an American rock band
- Grup Feroviar Român, a Romanian railway freight company
- Guinean franc
