= 5th Combat Communications Group =

US Air Force unit (1964– )

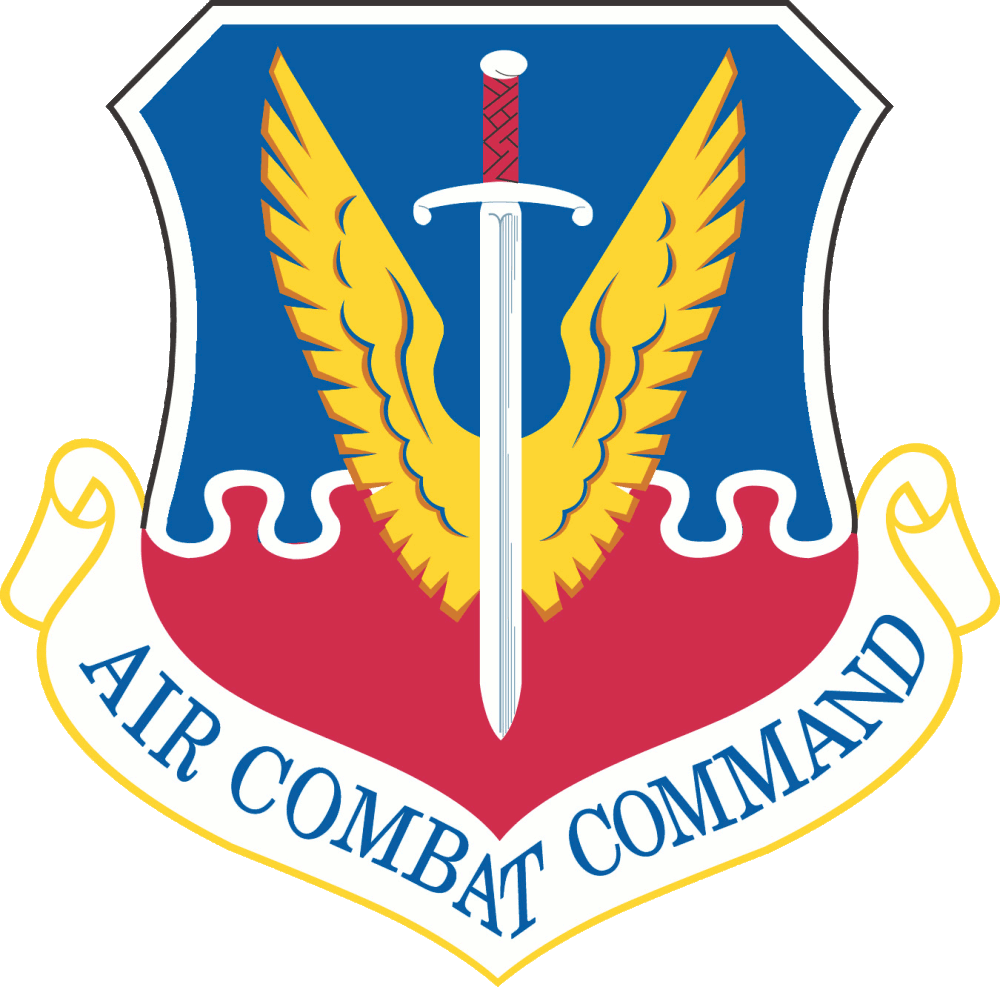
5th Combat Communications Group

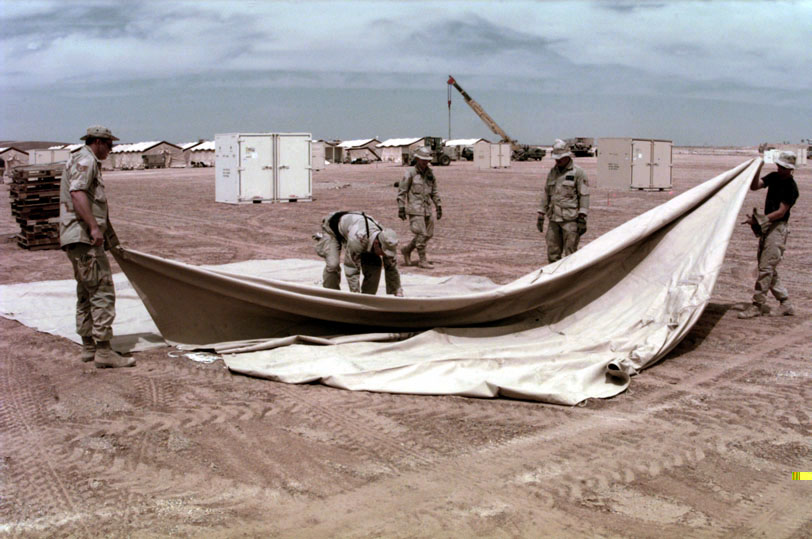
- Group members supporting an Air Expeditionary Force erect a tent in Jordan
- Active: 1964–present
- Country: United States
- Branch: United States Air Force
- Role: Tactical communications
- Size: About 500 people
- Part of: 461st Air Control Wing 15th Air Force Air Combat Command
- Garrison/HQ: Robins Air Force Base, Georgia
- Nickname: Fifth Mob
- Motto: "Let's Go!"
- Mascot: Alligator

Commanders
- Current commander: Colonel Jennifer A. B. Carns

Insignia
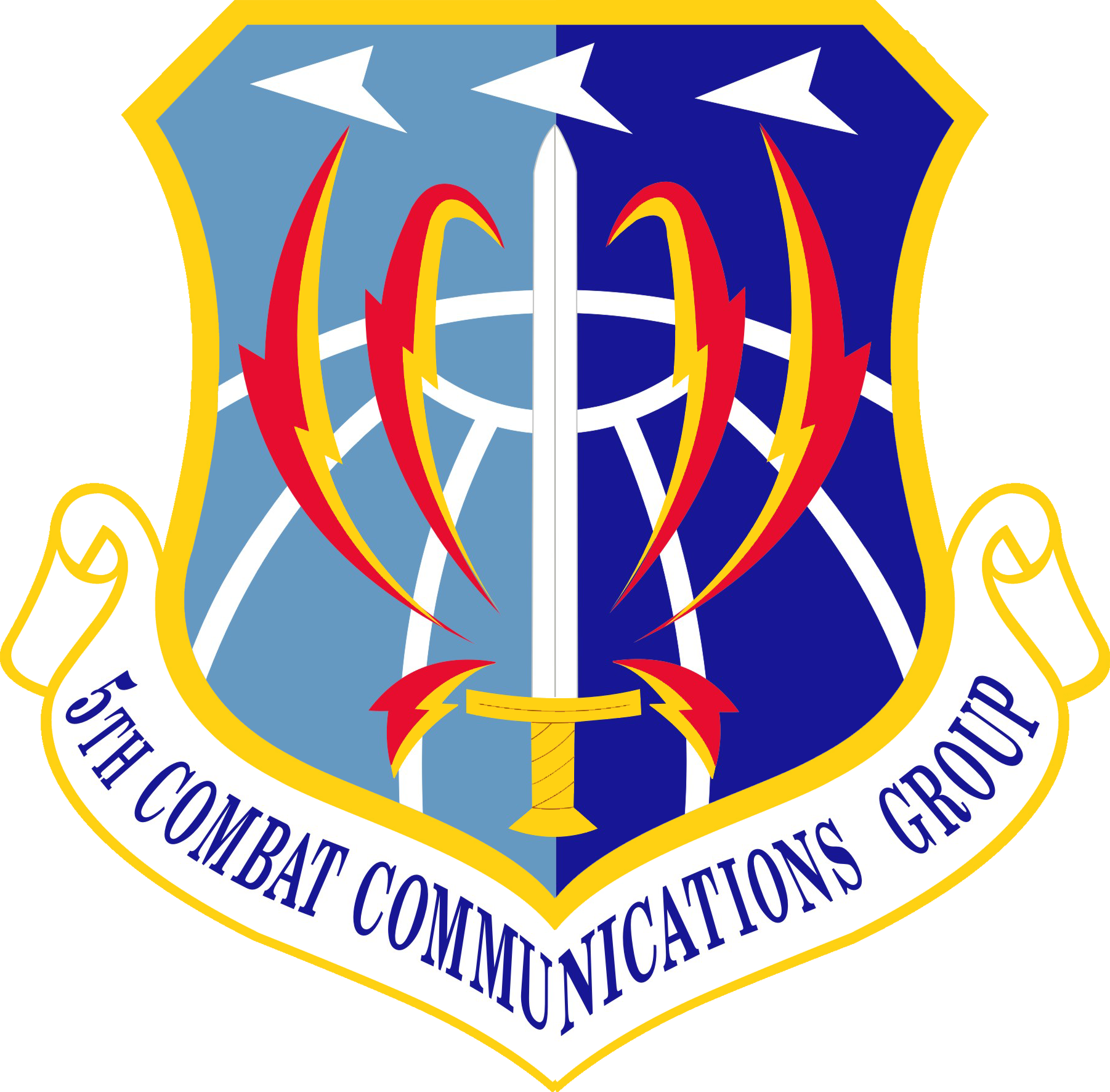
- 5th Combat Communications Group emblem (Note: Approved 23 May 1977.)

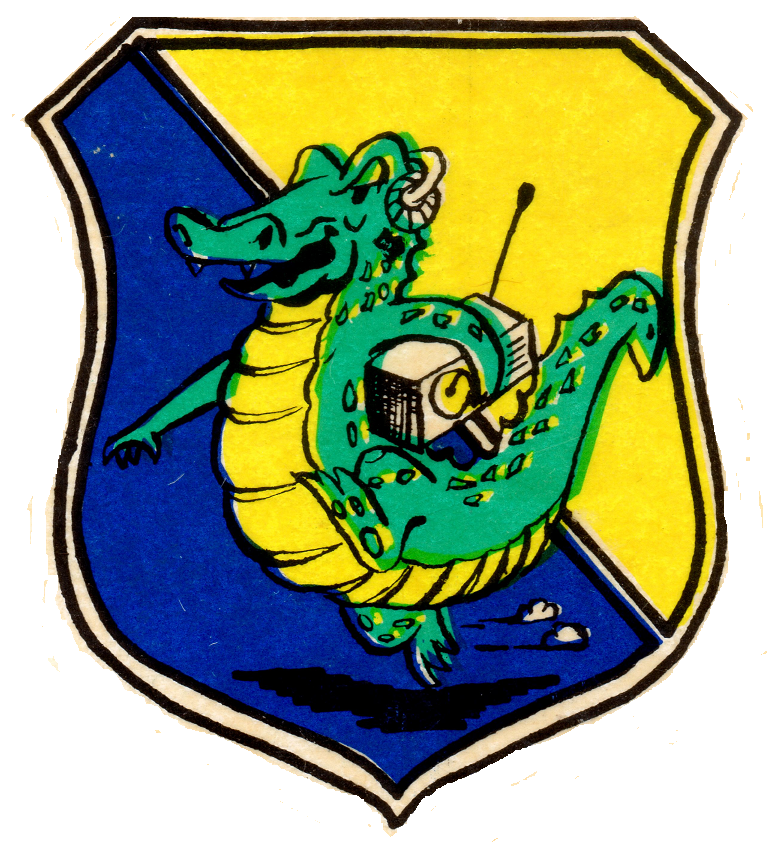
- 5th Mobile Communications Group emblem

The 5th Combat Communications Group is a specialized unit of the United States Air Force. The Fifth Mob (Note: Referred to as such by its former designation as the 5th Mobile Communications Group.) is based at Robins Air Force Base in Warner Robins, Georgia. Its current structure is made up of two active duty Combat Communications Squadrons (51st & 52d) and the 5th Combat Communications Support Squadron, which handles such activities as the group's Mobility Training Program (known as Mob School).

== Mission ==
The 5th Combat Communications supports United States United States Air Forces Central Command and Joint Chiefs of Staff worldwide. It also responds to contingencies, emergencies and natural disasters. The group also deploys to a variety of sites around the southeastern United States during training exercises. It has participated in more than five hundred deployments to locations that include Iceland, Egypt, Ecuador, Panama, Virgin Islands, Wake Island, Somalia, Kenya, Bosnia, Saudi Arabia, Oman and Honduras in recent years. The unit has approximately 500 people and can be a self-supporting combat unit. The group can provide its own site security, electrical power and vehicle maintenance. The 5th has more than 100 of its members deployed to remote locations of the world at any given time in support of ongoing operations, typically for 180 days at a time. In addition, the group advises two Air National Guard Combat Communications Groups composed of more than 2,300 people in units throughout the Eastern U.S. from Maine to the Virgin Islands.

The unit also participated in the ongoing war on drugs by supplying communications support, providing personnel and equipment which allows the Drug Enforcement Administration access to secure data and voice services from classified locations.

== Units ==
Title	Emblem
5th Combat Communications Support Squadron
51st Combat Communications Squadron	
52d Combat Communications Squadron	

== History ==
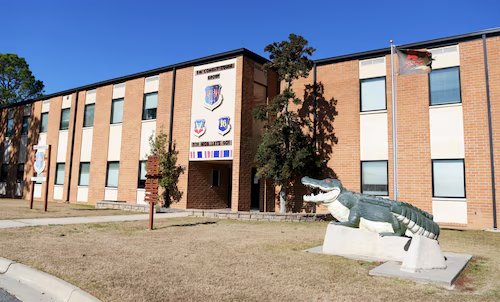
5th Combat Communications Group headquarters with alligator mascot

The group was first organized in July 1964 as the 5th Mobile Communications Group, a component of Air Force Communications Service (later Air Force Communications Command). It has had its current name since 1976, except for the period from 1984 to 1986 when Air Force Communications Command units were designated as "Information Systems" units.

Group air traffic controllers and air traffic control maintenance personnel were included in the force deployed for Operation Eagle Claw, the failed 1980 attempt to rescue the hostages held by the government of Iran in the Tehran embassy. Their mission was to establish and operate air navigation systems at "Desert One", the base of operations within Iran. When civilian government air traffic controllers walked off their jobs the following year, practically the entire air traffic control division of the 5th, along with controllers from the other combat control groups of the Air Force, deployed to civilian airports to maintain the flow of traffic within the United States. The controllers remained deployed until new civilian controllers were trained to replace those who had been dismissed.

During the 1980s until the end of the Iran–Iraq War, the Air Force maintained a deployed Airborne Warning and Control System maintaining surveillance of the Persian Gulf. The deployment was referred to as "ELF One." 5th Mob personnel rotated to ELF One during this period to provide communications support for the operation.

In September 1988, the group reorganized, transferring its people into three combat communications squadrons. Each squadron is assigned approximately 180 persons. The 51st Combat Communications Squadron provides communications and air traffic control support to an Air Force Headquarters. The 52d and 53d Squadrons provide communications and air traffic control support for deployed bases.

In 1990, when Air Force Communications Service was disestablished as a major command, the 5th Group became part of Tactical Air Command, which was replaced by Air Combat Command in 1992. In 2009, combat communications units, including the group, were made part of Air Force Space Command.

The 5th also lent its communications expertise to the Operation Bright Star in Egypt in 1995. More than 120 members of the 52d Combat Communications Squadron, along with augmentees from the group's other squadrons, participated in the largest multinational exercise of its kind.

During Operation Desert Storm, the 5th deployed more than 600 people to a dozen locations. It was the first communications unit in theater. The group's squadrons provided air traffic control and communications support to six deployed wings and Central Command Air Forces headquarters. Group personnel remained deployed to Southwest Asia for an additional three years to support the Cease Fire and maintaining United Nations resolutions.

In 1993, the group added the 5th Combat Communications Support Squadron to train and assist the combat communications squadrons for deployment. Later that year, the group added the 54th Combat Communications Squadron, whose mission mirrored that of the 52d and 53d Squadrons.

Members of the unit deployed to the Southwest Asia area of responsibility in March 1996 to support an Air Expeditionary Force. The communicators helped Air Force and multinational forces already in Saudi Arabia and other nearby countries patrol the no-fly zone over southern Iraq. When terrorists attacked Khobar Towers that year, the group was called upon again to deploy to the Persian Gulf. More than 140 members of the 5th, along with 250 tons of equipment, left Robins for Prince Sultan Air Base, where they established a complete communications network beside a bare airfield.

The 5th again received orders to deploy in early February 2003 to the Central Command theater of operations. They were part of a larger action by the United States to reposition some of its military forces to support the global war on terrorism and to prepare for future contingencies. The deployment marked the first time the Air Force's first total force wing, composed of both National Guard and active duty, Air Force and Army, would deploy.

== Lineage ==
- Constituted as the 5th Mobile Communications Group on 20 May 1964 and activated (not organized)

Organized on 1 July 1964
Redesignated 5th Combat Communications Group on 31 March 1976
Redesignated 5th Combat Information Systems Group on 15 August 1984
Redesignated 5th Combat Communications Group on 1 Oct 1986 (Note: On 22 July 1988 the group became Headquarters, 5th Combat Communications Group when squadrons were assigned to it for the first time.)

=== Assignment ===
- Air Force Communications Service, 20 May 1964 (not organized)
- Tactical Communications Region (later Tactical Communications Area), 1 July 1964
- 12th Tactical Communications Region, 1 December 1969
- Tactical Communications Area (later Tactical Communications Division, Tactical Information Systems Division, Tactical Communications Division), 30 June 1971
- 507th Tactical Air Control Wing (later 507th Air Control Wing), 1 October 1990
- 347th Fighter Wing, 28 May 1992
- Ninth Air Force, 1 March 1994
- Twenty-Fourth Air Force, 18 August 2009
- 689th Combat Communications Wing, 5 October 2009
- Twenty-Fourth Air Force, 30 September 2013
- 688th Cyberspace Wing, 4 June 2018
- 461st Air Control Wing, 1 September 2024

=== Components ===
- 5th Combat Communications Support Squadron, 15 June 1992 – present
- 51st Combat Communications Squadron, 22 July 1988 – present
- 52d Combat Communications Squadron, 22 July 1988 – present
- 53d Combat Communications Squadron, 22 July 1988 – 1 October 2014
- 54th Combat Communications Squadron, 18 June 1993 – 1 October 2014
- 85th Engineering Installation Squadron, by April 2023 – present

=== Stations ===
- Robins Air Force Base, Georgia, 1 July 1964 – present

=== Awards and campaigns ===
Award streamer	Award	Dates	Notes
	Meritorious Unit Award	1 June 2007–31 May 2009	5th Combat Communications Group
	Meritorious Unit Award	5 October 2009-4 October 2010	5th Combat Communications Group
	Meritorious Unit Award	5 October 2011-4 October 2013	5th Combat Communications Group
	Meritorious Unit Award	5 October 2013-4 October 2015	5th Combat Communications Group
	Air Force Outstanding Unit Award w/Combat "V" Device	1 January 1972–31 December 1973	5th Mobile Communications Group
	Air Force Outstanding Unit Award	1 January 1976–31 December 1977	5th Mobile Communications Group (later 5th Combat Communications Group)
	Air Force Outstanding Unit Award	1 June 1988-31 May 1990	5th Combat Communications Group
	Air Force Outstanding Unit Award	1 October 1990–30 April 1991	5th Combat Communications Group
	Air Force Outstanding Unit Award	28 May 1992-22 February 1993	5th Combat Communications Group
	Air Force Outstanding Unit Award	1 March 1993–31 July 1994	5th Combat Communications Group
	Air Force Outstanding Unit Award	1 June 1998-31 May 2000	5th Combat Communications Group
	Air Force Outstanding Unit Award	1 June 2002–31 May 2003	5th Combat Communications Group
	Air Force Outstanding Unit Award	1 June 2003–31 May 2004	5th Combat Communications Group
	Air Force Outstanding Unit Award	1 June 2004–31 May 2005	5th Combat Communications Group
	Air Force Outstanding Unit Award	1 June 2005–31 May 2007	5th Combat Communications Group
	Air Force Outstanding Unit Award	5 October 2010-4 October 2011	5th Combat Communications Group

Campaign Streamer	Campaign	Phase	Dates	Notes
	Southwest Asia Service Medal	Defense of Saudi Arabia	2 August 1990 – 16 January 1991	5th Combat Communications Group
	Southwest Asia Service Medal	Liberation and Defense of Kuwait	17 January 1991 – 11 April 1991	5th Combat Communications Group
	Global War on Terrorism Service Medal	n/a	-	5th Combat Communications Group

USAF Communications Awards

- Major General Harold M. McClelland Award for Best USAF Large Communications Unit 1973, 2003, 2006, 2007, 2008 and 2012
- Best Large Communications-Computer Systems Unit in Air Combat Command 1993 and 1997
- Top honors at Combat Challenge '94, a biennial command, control, communications and computer competition sponsored by Air Combat Command

== Major combat operations ==
=== Persian Gulf War ===
During Operation Desert Shield and Operation Desert Storm, the 5 CCG deployed over 600 airmen to the Persian gulf region at more than a dozen locations. To start the trend, the 5 CCG was the first tactical communications unit in theater. The 5 CCG provided air traffic control and communications support to six deployed wings as well as USCENTAF (now AFCENT) deployed headquarters. The group maintained steady deployments in support of Operations Northern Watch and Southern Watch.

=== Global War on Terrorism ===
Operations in progress

2001 – present

=== Afghanistan War ===
2001 - 2021

==== Operation Enduring Freedom / International Security Assistance Force ====
2001 – 2014

==== Operation Freedom's Sentinel / Resolute Support Mission ====
2015 - 2021

=== Iraq War ===
2003 - 2011

==== Operation Iraqi Freedom ====
2003 – 2010

==== Operation New Dawn ====
2010 – 2011
