= VX-23 =

Aviation unit of the United States Navy

Air Test and Evaluation Squadron 23
- VX-23 Insignia
- Active: 22 July 1995 - present
- Country: United States
- Branch: United States Navy
- Type: Special flight test aircraft squadron
- Garrison/HQ: Naval Air Station Patuxent River
- Nickname: Salty Dogs
- Colors: SD

Air Test and Evaluation Squadron 23 (VX-23) is an aviation unit of the United States Navy based at Naval Air Station Patuxent River, Maryland, United States. The squadron was established on 22 July 1995. Using the tail code SD, the squadron operates multiple aircraft types of the United States Navy for test and evaluation purposes. The aircraft fly with the radio callsign Salty Dog.

== Overview ==
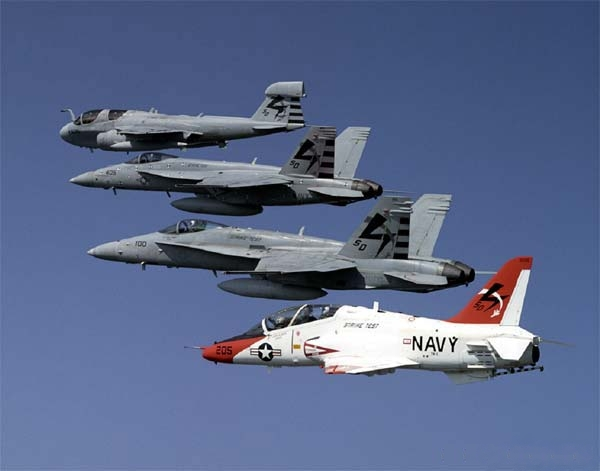
Aircraft assigned to VX-23 include EA-6B, F/A-18E, F/A-18C and T-45.

VX-23 is an aircraft test squadron that conducts research, testing and evaluation of fixed wing tactical aircraft and UAV's. VX-23 provides aircraft, pilots, maintenance services, safety oversights and facility support for these operations. Their main mission is flying qualities and performance evaluations, shipboard suitability, propulsion system testing, tactical aircraft mission systems testing, ordnance compatibility and ballistics efforts, reliability and maintainability assessments, flight fidelity simulation and flight control software development. The squadron also provides Government Flight Representative, test monitoring, chase aircraft support, facilities for contractor demonstration, validation and development work involving tactical aircraft and associated systems. The squadron currently flies the T-45 Goshawk, F-35B/C Lightning II, F/A-18E/F Super Hornet, E/A-18G Growler, and MQ-25 Stingray.

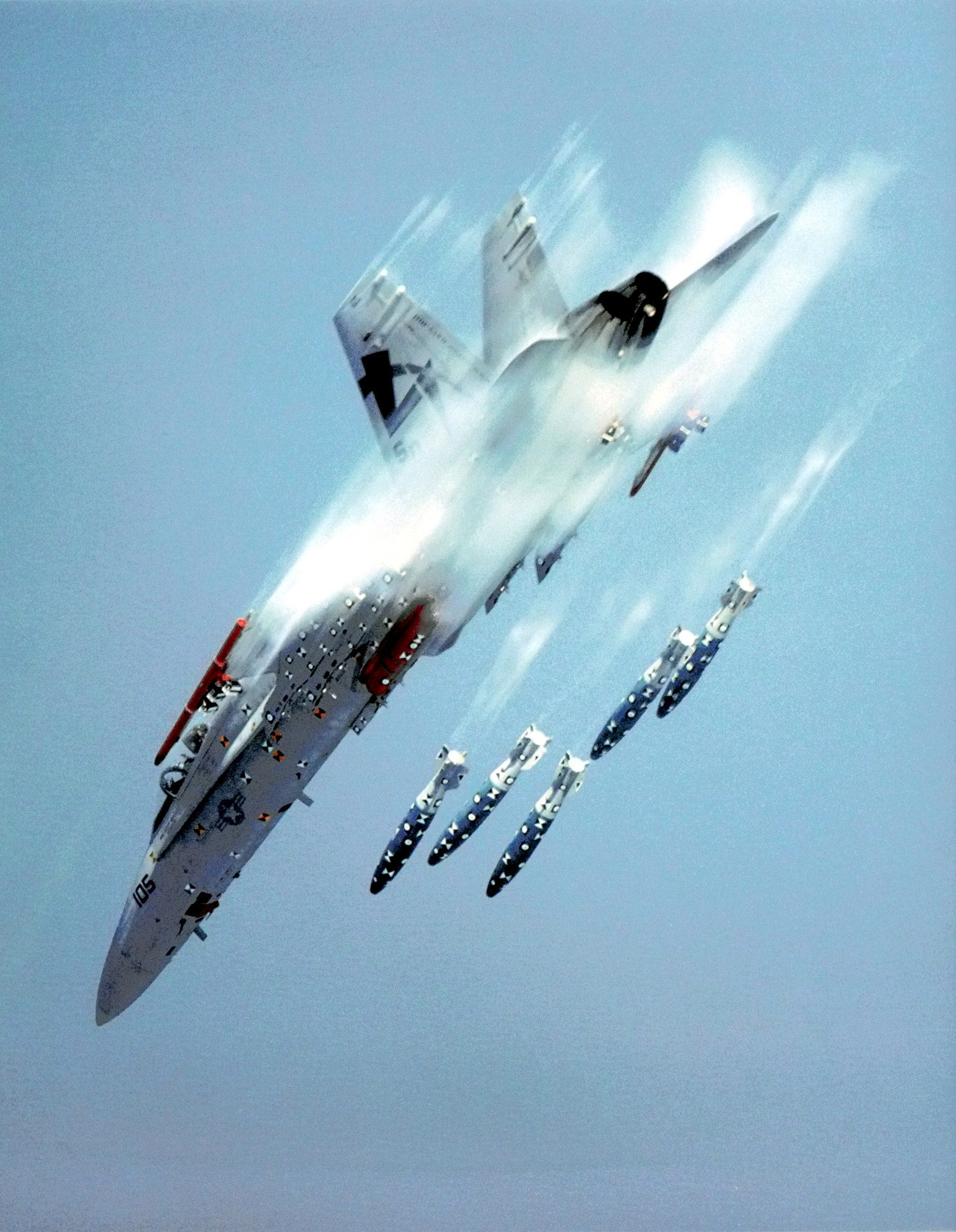
An VX-23 F/A-18A (BuNo 163093 'SD105') releases Mk 83 bombs over the Atlantic Test Range, July 2002.

== History ==
The squadron was established in on 22 July 1995 as the Naval Strike Aircraft Test Squadron and redesignated VX-23 on 1 May 2002. During the years VX-23, has tested and evaluated fixed-wing fighter, attack and other designated aircraft including EA-6B, F-14, F/A-18 and T-45. VX-23 hosted and provided Flight Test Aircrew for the Joint Strike Fighter X-32 and X-35 concept demonstration aircraft as well as the X-31 VECTOR test vehicle.

The squadron consists of about 40 officers and 90 enlisted drawn from the US Navy and US Marine Corps and also 340 contractor and civil servant personnel involved with maintenance, planning and safety oversight. These people support the squadron's 40 F/A-18A-G, EA-6B and T-45 aircraft. Additionally the squadron is supported by hundreds of flight test engineers provided by NAVAIRSYSCOM 5.1.6 (Test and Evaluation Engineering) and various other contractors. The squadron conducts over 2,600 flight operations every year which sums up to roughly 3,500 flight hours, much of which involves high-risk flight test. VX-23 conducts operations from a facility that includes three large hangars and also operates and maintains a TC-7 catapult and MK-7 arresting gear facility.

== 21st century ==
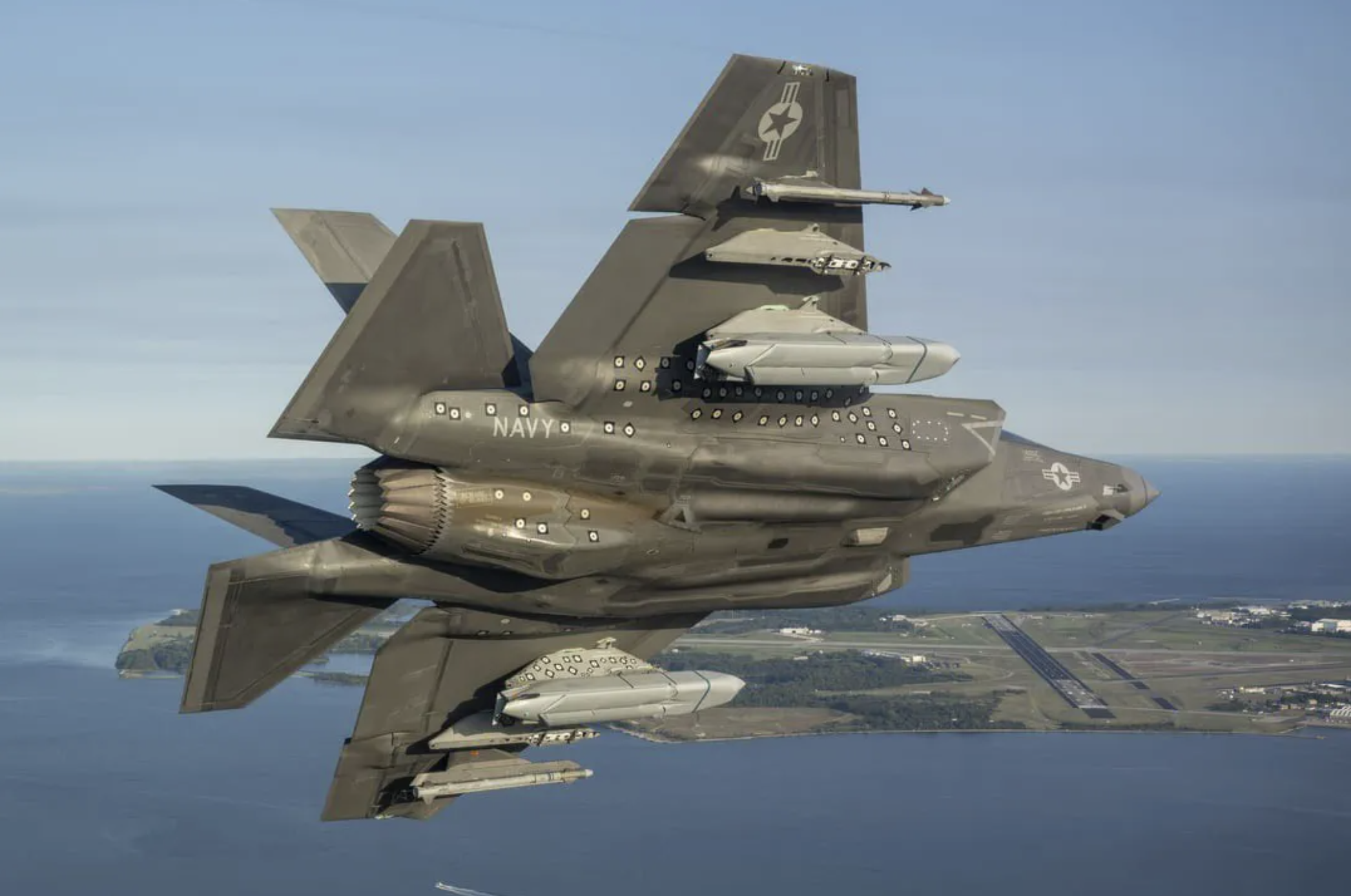
An F-35C Lightning II carrying two AGM-158C LRASM anti-ship missiles over NAS Patuxent River.

On 4 June 2021, the first refuelling test and evaluation flight was conducted with the MQ-25 drone refuelling aircraft providing fuel to an F/A-18E/F Super Hornet. The test had the MQ-25 originate at MidAmerica Airport in Mascoutah, Illinois, and the F/A-18 was from the VX-23. The mission lasted about 4.5 hours, and the two aircraft were connected for dry or wet connects numerous times for a total time of more than 10 minutes, with a total of 325 pounds of fuel passed.

== See also ==
- History of the United States Navy
- List of United States Navy aircraft squadrons
- VX-20
