= Augustine Warner Robins =

Former General in the United States Army Air Corps

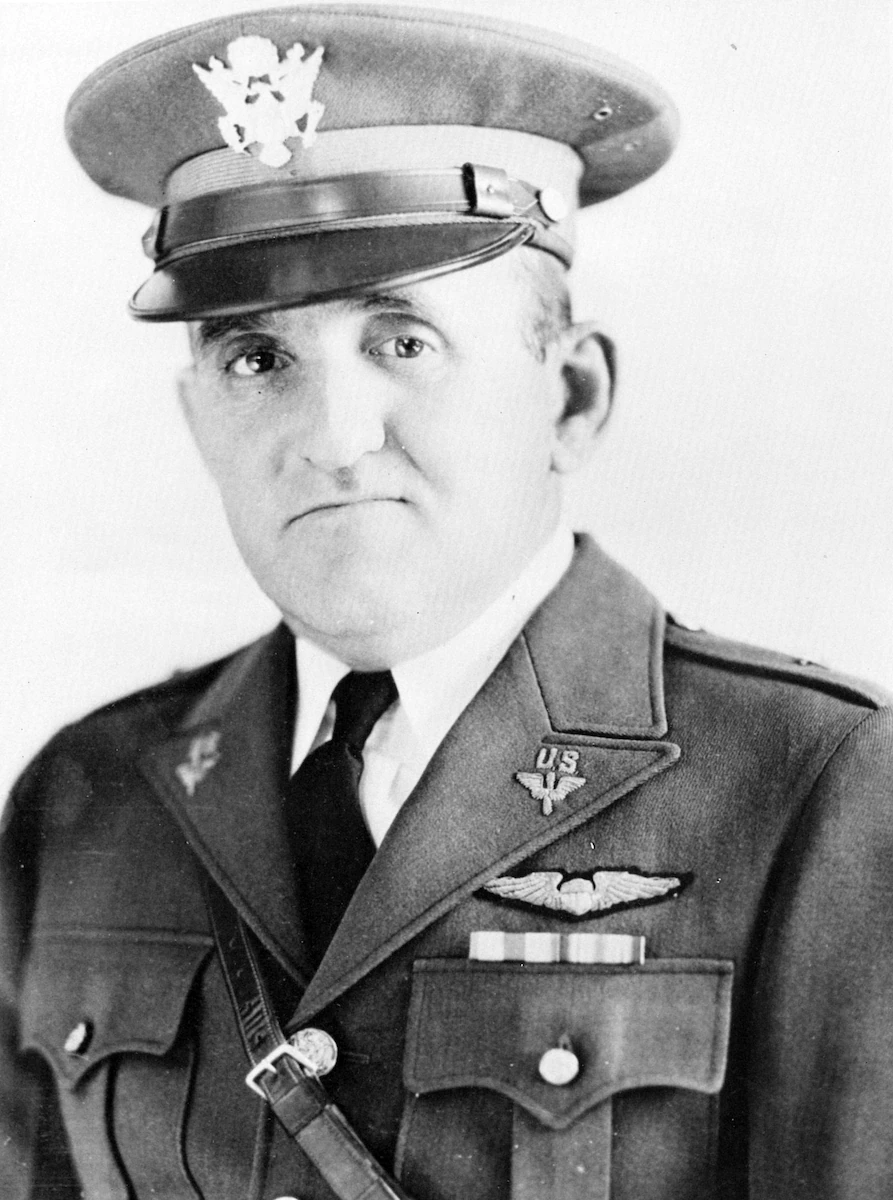
- Official Portrait of Brig. Gen Robins.
- Born: September 29, 1882; Gloucester County, Virginia, US
- Died: 16 June 1940 (aged 57); Randolph Field, Texas, US
- Burial place: Arlington National Cemetery
- Military career
- Allegiance: United States
- Branch: U.S. Army Air Forces
- Service years: 1907 - 1940
- Rank: Brigadier General
- Commands: Air Corps Training Center
- Conflicts: Mexican Expedition
- Other work: Namesake of Robins Air Force Base

General Augustine Warner Robins (September 29, 1882 – June 16, 1940) is often credited as the Father of Logistics in the modern United States Air Force, then known as the Army Air Corps. He was instrumental in the establishment of the first official and workable Air Force supply maintenance and accountability system, and helped establish official guidelines for the training of logistics officers, NCOs, and civilians working for the Air Force. He is the namesake of the city of Warner Robins, Georgia.

Robins was born in Gloucester Courthouse, Virginia, in 1882. His parents were Col. William Todd Robins, the commander of the 24th Virginia Cavalry in the American Civil War, and Sally Berkeley Nelson. Robins was named after his grandfather, Augustine Warner (A. W.) Robins. He was at West Point as a cadet from 1903–1907 where he graduated with the Class of 1907 alongside other famous officers like General of the Air Force Henry H. Arnold and Major General James Lawton Collins. Robins served under General John Pershing's punitive 1916 expedition into Mexico against Pancho Villa. In 1919, he was sent to the Supply Division of the fledgling Air Service at Wright Field, Ohio, where he spent the next twenty years playing his pivotal role in the development of air-based combat logistics. In 1935, he was promoted to Brigadier General, one of four in the Army Air Corps at that time, and was given command of the Materiel Division at Wright Field; for the next four years, he would push for increased funding for research and development, as well as key technologies such as B-17s, the Norden bombsight, and the high-octane gasoline that would later power the fighters of World War II in the European and Pacific theaters. In 1939, he was reassigned to the command of the Air Training division in Texas; however, he died from a heart attack in June of the next year. Over a year after his death, the Army Air Corps began to make use of Robins's contributions during its actions in World War II.

The Warner Robins Army Air Depot (now the Warner Robins Air Logistics Center, or WR-ALC) at Robins Field, later to become Robins Air Force Base, Georgia, was named in honor of General Robins, and is also a major depot for Air Force logistics in its own right.

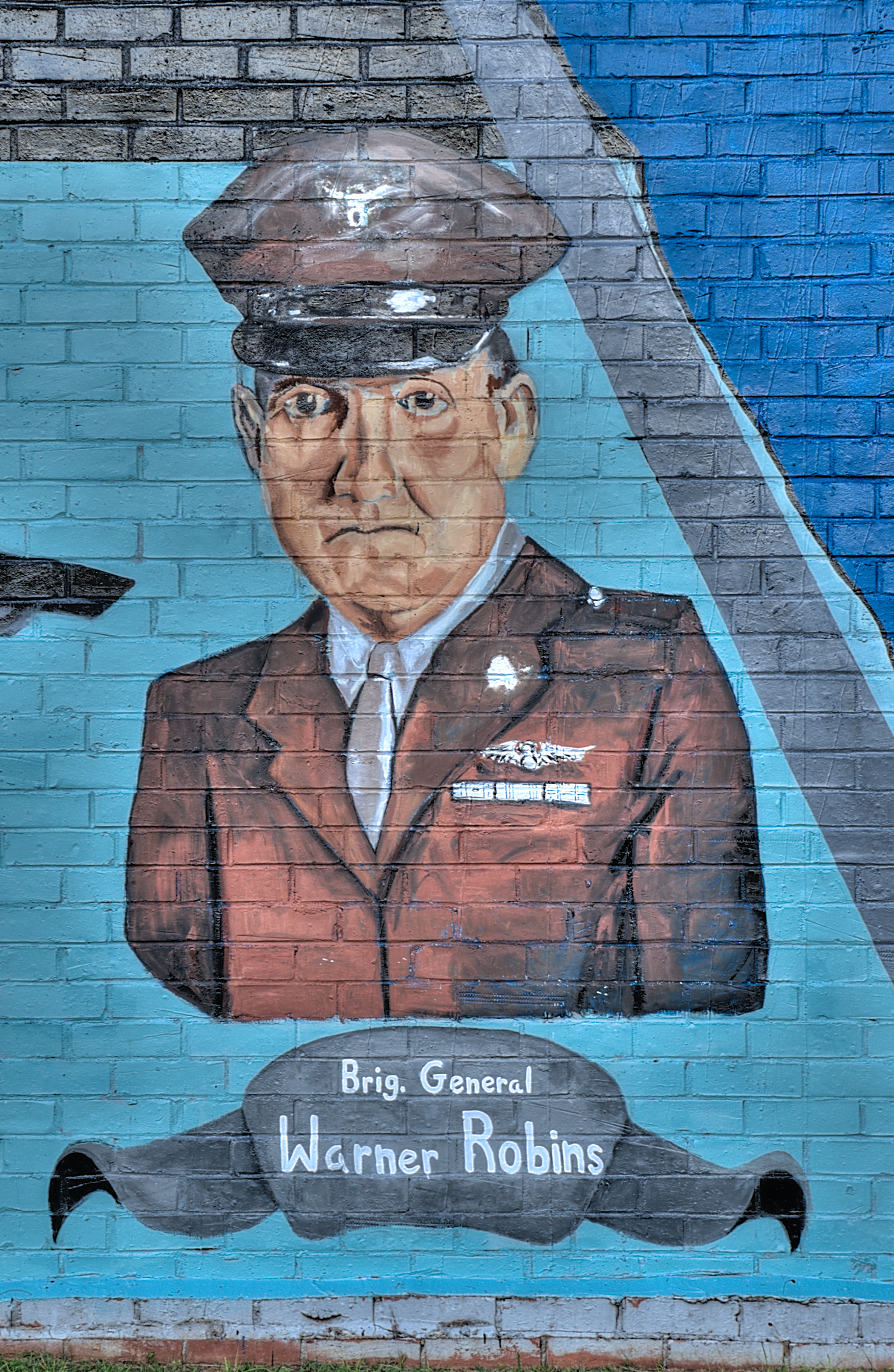
Mural of Gen. Robins
