= John J. Pitney =

American political scientist

John Jack Pitney, Jr.
- Born: June 18, 1955 (age 71)
- Education: Union College
- Scientific career
- Fields: Political science
- Workplaces: Yale University; Claremont McKenna College

John Jack Pitney Jr. (born June 18, 1955) is an American political scientist. He is the Roy P. Crocker Professor of Politics at Claremont McKenna College.

== Early life and education ==
Pitney was born in 1955, the son of a milkman and a homemaker. He grew up on the west side of Saratoga Springs, New York, where his grandfather told him stories of local political corruption and he volunteered for Richard Nixon's 1968 presidential campaign. He attended Union College, graduating in 1977 as co-valedictorian. He received his doctorate in political science from Yale University in 1985; his dissertation focused on government handling of toxic waste.

== Career ==
From 1978 to 1984, Pitney worked as a legislative assistant for three Republicans: New York state senator John R. Dunne, Alfonse D'Amato (R‑NY), and future vice president Dick Cheney (then R‑WY AL).

In 1984, he joined the U.S. House Republican Research Committee as a senior domestic policy analyst. In 1986, he joined the faculty of the government department at Claremont McKenna College (CMC). From 1989 to 1991, he took a leave to serve as the deputy director and then acting director of the Republican National Committee's research department.

Pitney is a frequently quoted and interviewed in the political media.

He is also an expert on the politics of autism and wrote a book on the subject.

Pitney is a vocal critic of President Donald Trump. He renounced his membership in the Republican Party the night Trump was elected for a first term.

== Books ==
- Connelly, William F.; Pitney, John J. Jr. (1994). Congress' Permanent Minority?: Republicans in the U.S. House. Lanham, Maryland: Rowman & Littlefield. ISBN 978-0-8226-3032-6.
- The Art of Political Warfare. University of Oklahoma Press. September 2001. ISBN 978-0-8061-3382-9.
- Ceaser, James W.; Busch, Andrew E.; Pitney, John J. Jr. (2009). Epic Journey: The 2008 Elections and American Politics. Lanham, Maryland: Rowman & Littlefield. ISBN 978-1-4422-1144-5.
- Bessette, Joseph M.; Pitney, John J. (2011). American Government and Politics: Deliberation, Democracy and Citizenship (2nd ed.). Belmont, Massachusetts: Wadsworth. ISBN 978-1-133-58789-7.
- Ceaser, James W.; Busch, Andrew E.; Pitney, John J. Jr. (2013). After Hope and Change The 2012 Elections and American Politics. Lanham, Maryland: Rowman & Littlefield. ISBN 978-1-4422-4745-1.
- Pitney, John J. Jr.; Levin, John-Clark (November 2013). Private Anti-Piracy Navies How Warships for Hire are Changing Maritime Security. Lanham, Maryland: Lexington Books. ISBN 978-0-7391-7332-9.
- The Politics of Autism: Navigating The Contested Spectrum. Lanham, Maryland: Rowman & Littlefield. August 2015. ISBN 978-1-4422-4960-8.
- Un-American: The Fake Patriotism of Donald J. Trump. Lanham, Maryland: Rowman & Littlefield. April 2020. ISBN 978-1-5381-2925-8.

== Personal life ==
Pitney is married and has two children. His wife works for Disney.
