= 339th Flight Test Squadron =

339th Flight Test Squadron

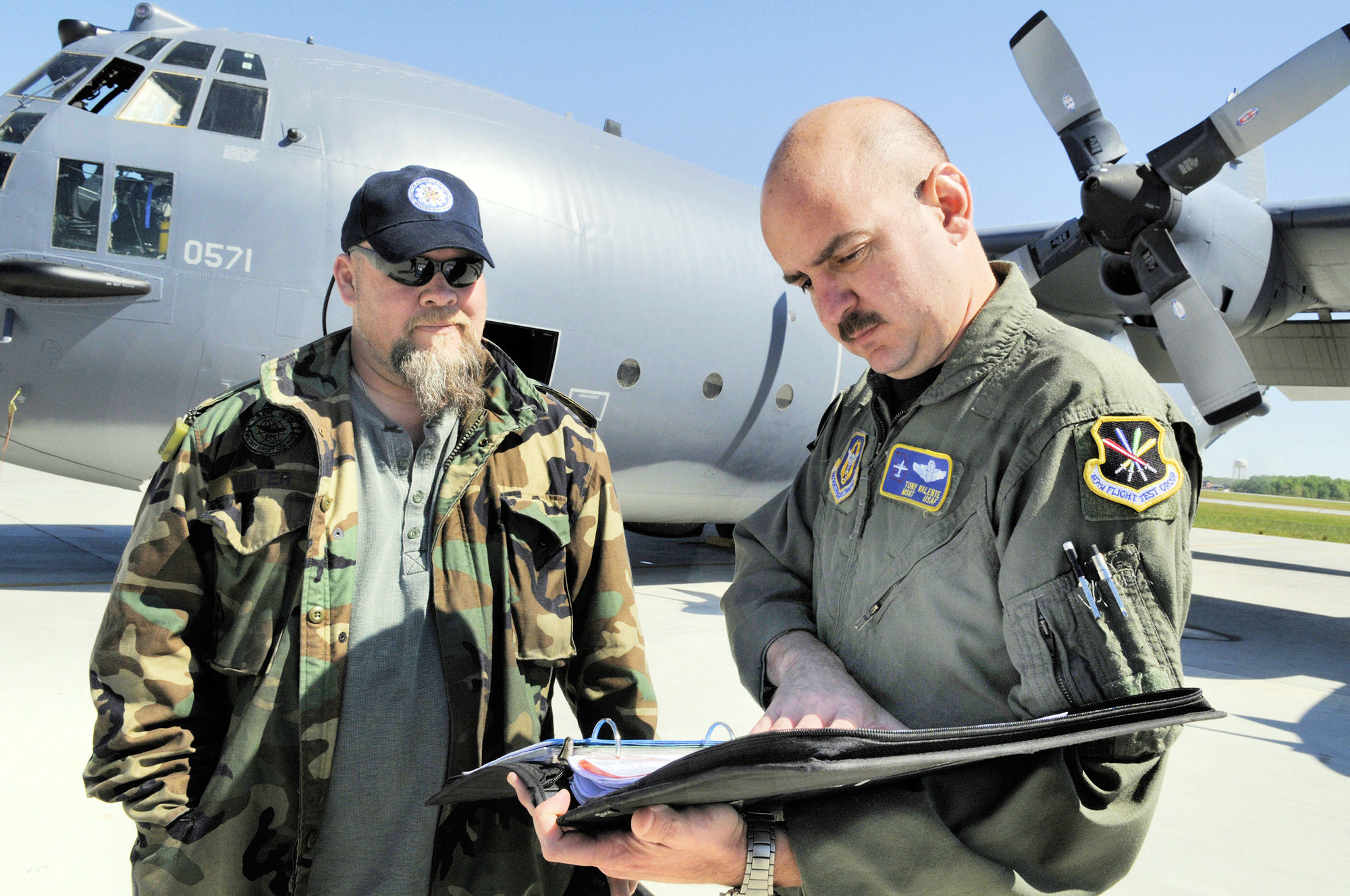
- Eddie Minter, C-130 functional test work lead, meets with MSgt Tony Valente, flight engineer to review maintenance records before a MC-130E test flight.
- Active: 1942–1946; 1946–1958; 1975–1983; 1988–present
- Country: United States
- Branch: United States Air Force
- Role: Flight Testing
- Part of: Air Force Materiel Command
- Garrison/HQ: Robins Air Force Base, Georgia
- Motto: Respice Finem Latin Examine the End (1988–1992)
- Engagements: World War II Asia-Pacific Theater; Korean War

- Decorations: Distinguished Unit Citation (4x); Navy Presidential Unit Citation; Air Force Outstanding Unit Award (2x); Philippines Presidential Unit Citation

Insignia
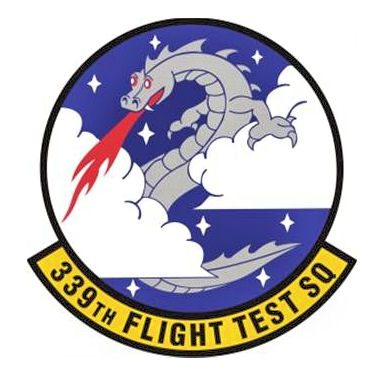
- 339th Flight Test Squadron emblem (approved 19 October 1955, reinstated 20 October 1992)

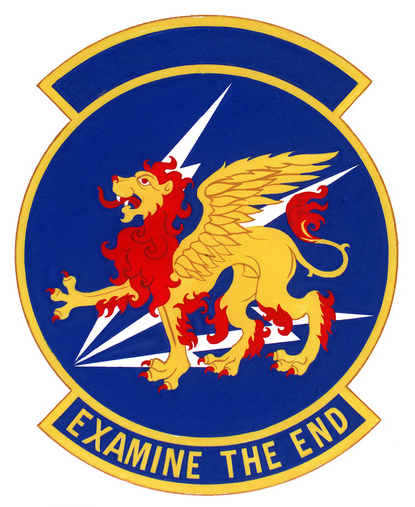
- 2875th Test Squadron emblem (approved 30 November 1988)

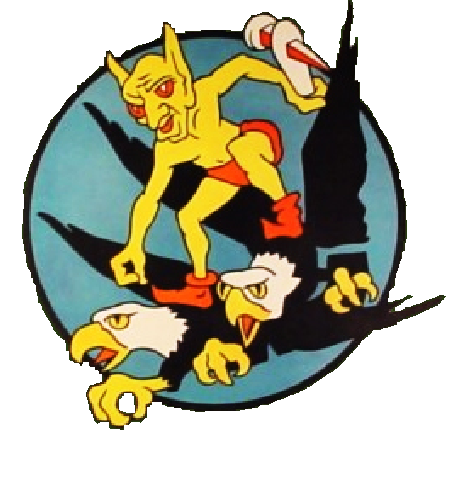
- 339th Fighter Squadron emblem (approved 2 December 1942)

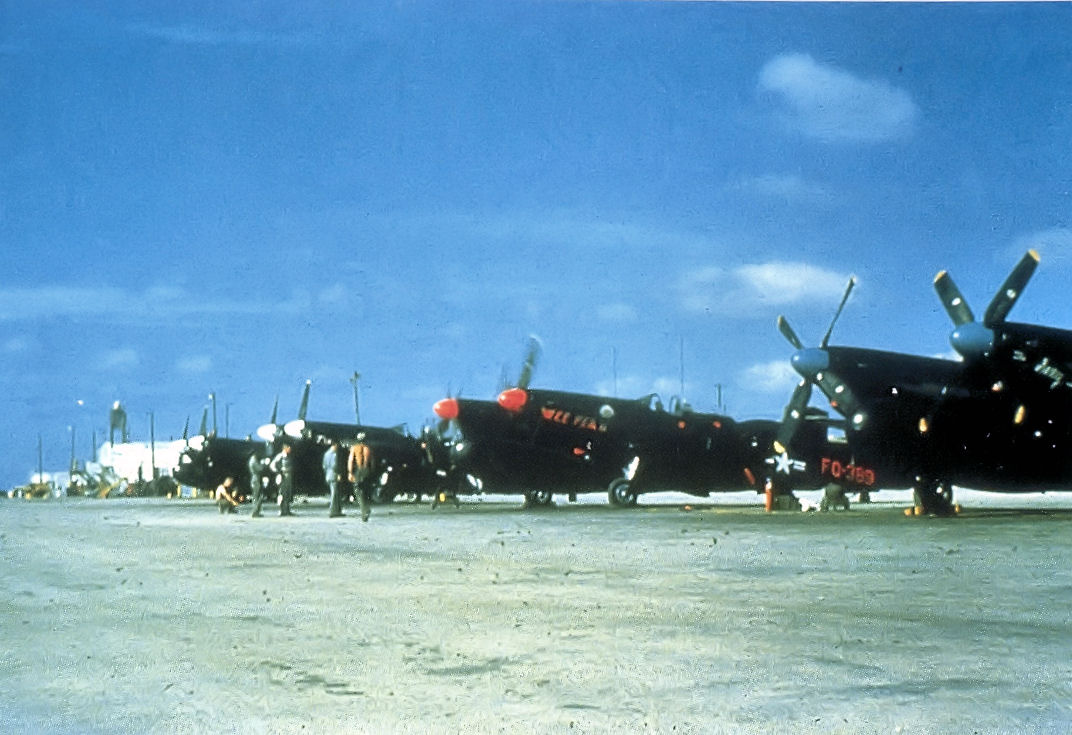
339th Fighter Squadron F-82s at Johnson Air Base, Japan (Note: Aircraft are North American F-82E Twin Mustangs. Serial 46-353 is in the center. Taken in 1950.)

The 339th Flight Test Squadron is a United States Air Force unit based at Robins Air Force Base, Georgia. It is part of the Warner Robins Air Logistics Center, with a mission to certify aircraft as worthy to return to service. The squadron is responsible for conducting flight tests on the Lockheed C-130 Hercules, the Lockheed C-5 Galaxy and McDonnell Douglas F-15 Eagle after program depot maintenance is completed.

In addition to conducting rigorous flight testing, the squadron also ferries aircraft including those damaged in combat—to required destinations for repair, maintenance, or operational use.

During World War II, the squadron was tasked with one of the most audacious missions of the Pacific Theater: Operation Vengeance, the successful interception and downing of the aircraft carrying Imperial Japanese Navy Admiral Isoroku Yamamoto on April 18, 1943. Flying long-range P-38 Lightning fighters from Guadalcanal, pilots of the 339th Fighter Squadron executed the precise, high-risk operation that eliminated the architect of the Pearl Harbor attack, delivering a major strategic and psychological blow to Japan.

== History ==
=== World War II ===
Combat in South and Southwest Pacific, c. 22 October 1942 – 8 August 1945. As the 339th Fighter Squadron, notably carried out Operation Vengeance on 18 April 1943, resulting in the death of Japanese admiral Isoroku Yamamoto, who had planned the attack on Pearl Harbor. Multiple pilots in the squadron earned the Navy Cross for their roles in the mission.

=== Air defense of Japan and Korean War ===
The squadron was reactivated on 20 February 1947, when it took over the personnel and aircraft from the 6th Night Fighter Squadron, which was simultaneously inactivated. Air defense in Japan, 1946–1958. Combat in Korea, 27 June – 5 July 1950.

=== Tactical Air Command ===
The squadron was inactivated in August 1983 and its personnel and aircraft were transferred to the 69th Tactical Fighter Squadron, which was simultaneously activated.

=== Flight test operations ===
Tested possible modifications for various weapons systems, 1988–.

== Lineage ==
339th Tactical Fighter Squadron

- Constituted as the 339th Fighter Squadron on 29 September 1942

Activated on 3 October 1942
Redesignated 339th Fighter Squadron (Twin Engine) on 23 February 1943
Redesignated 339th Fighter Squadron, Two Engine on 20 August 1943
Inactivated on 1 January 1946

- Redesignated 339th Fighter Squadron, Single Engine on 13 July 1946

Activated on 25 August 1946
Redesignated 339th Fighter Squadron (All Weather) on 20 February 1947
Redesignated 339th Fighter Squadron, All Weather on 10 August 1948
Redesignated 339th Fighter-All Weather Squadron on 20 January 1950
Redesignated 339th Fighter-Interceptor Squadron on 25 April 1951
Inactivated on 15 January 1958

- Redesignated 339th Tactical Fighter Squadron on 19 December 1975

Activated on 30 December 1975
Inactivated on 1 July 1983

- Consolidated with the 2875th Test Squadron as the 339th Test Squadron on 1 October 1992

339th Flight Test Squadron

- Designated as the 2875th Test Squadron and activated on 15 January 1988
- Consolidated with the 339th Tactical Fighter Squadron as the 339th Test Squadron on 1 October 1992

Redesignated 339th Flight Test Squadron on 15 March 1994

=== Assignments ===
- 347th Fighter Group, 3 October 1942 – 1 January 1946
- Thirteenth Air Force, 25 August 1946
- 347th Fighter Group (later 347th Fighter-All Weather Group), 20 February 1947 (attached to 35th Fighter Wing (later 35th Fighter-Interceptor Wing) after 1 July 1949)
- Fifth Air Force, 24 June 1950 (remained attached to 35th Fighter-Interceptor Wing until 26 June 1950, attached to 8th Fighter-Bomber Wing until 5 July 1950, again attached to 35 Fighter-Interceptor Wing)
- 314th Air Division, 1 December 1950 (attached to 6162d Air Base Wing until 24 May 1951, then to 35th Fighter-Interceptor Wing)
- Japan Air Defense Force, 1 March 1952 (attached to 35th Fighter-Interceptor Wing until 20 July 1954, then to 49th Fighter-Bomber Wing)
- Fifth Air Force, 1 September 1954 (remained attached to 49th Fighter-Bomber Wing until 18 November 1954, then to 4th Fighter-Interceptor Wing)
- 39th Air Division, 1 March 1955 – 15 January 1958 (attached to 4th Fighter-Interceptor Wing until 15 September 1957)
- 347th Tactical Fighter Wing, 30 December 1975 – 1 July 1983
- Warner Robins Air Logistics Center, 15 January 1988
- 622d Flight Test Group, 1 October 2001
- 413th Flight Test Group, 1 October 2003 – present

=== Stations ===
- New Caledonia, 3 October 1942 (detachment operated from Kukum Field, Guadalcanal, Solomon Islands until 1 December 1943)
- Kukum Field, Guadalcanal, Solomon Islands, 29 December 1943
- Stirling Island, Solomon Islands, 15 January 1944
- Sansapor, New Guinea, 15 August 1944
- Middleburg Island, 19 September 1944 (operated from Morotai, Maluku Islands after 13 February)
- San Jose, Mindoro, Philippines, 22 February 1945 (continued to operate from Morotai)
- Puerto Princesa, Palawan., Philippines, 6 March – 11 December 1945 (continued to operate from Morotaiuntil until 25 March 1945)
- Camp Stoneman, California, 30 December 1945 – 1 January 1946
- Fort William McKinley, Luzon, Philippines, 25 August 1946
- Johnson Air Base, Japan, 15 December 1946
- Yokota Air Base, Japan, 1 April 1950
- Johnson Air Base, Japan, 4 August 1950
- Chitose Air Base, Japan, 20 July 1954 – 15 January 1958
- Moody Air Force Base, Georgia, 30 December 1975 – 1 July 1983
- Robins Air Force Base Georgia, 15 January 1988 – present

=== Aircraft operated ===
- Curtiss P-40 Warhawk P-40, 1942
- Bell P-39 Airacobra, 1942–1943
- Lockheed P-38 Lightning, 1942–1945
- Northrop P-61 Black Widow (later F-61), 1947–1950
- North American F-82 Twin Mustang, 1949–1951
- Lockheed F-94 Starfire, 1951–1955
- Lockheed F-80 Shooting Star, 1953–1954
- North American F-86 Sabre, 1955–1957
- McDonnell F-4 Phantom II, 1976–1983
