= Sally Nelson Robins =

American suffragist

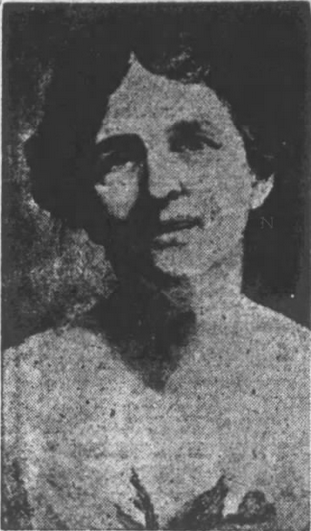
- Born: March 18, 1855
- Died: February 4, 1925
- Occupations: Writer, suffragist

Sally Berkeley Nelson Robins (March 18, 1855 – February 4, 1925) was an American librarian, newspaper columnist, and suffragist.

== Career ==
Robins studied at the Eclectic Institute in Baltimore, Maryland. She was assistant librarian for the Virginia Historical Society and genealogical editor for the Richmond Times-Dispatch. She was a member of the Equal Suffrage League of Virginia.

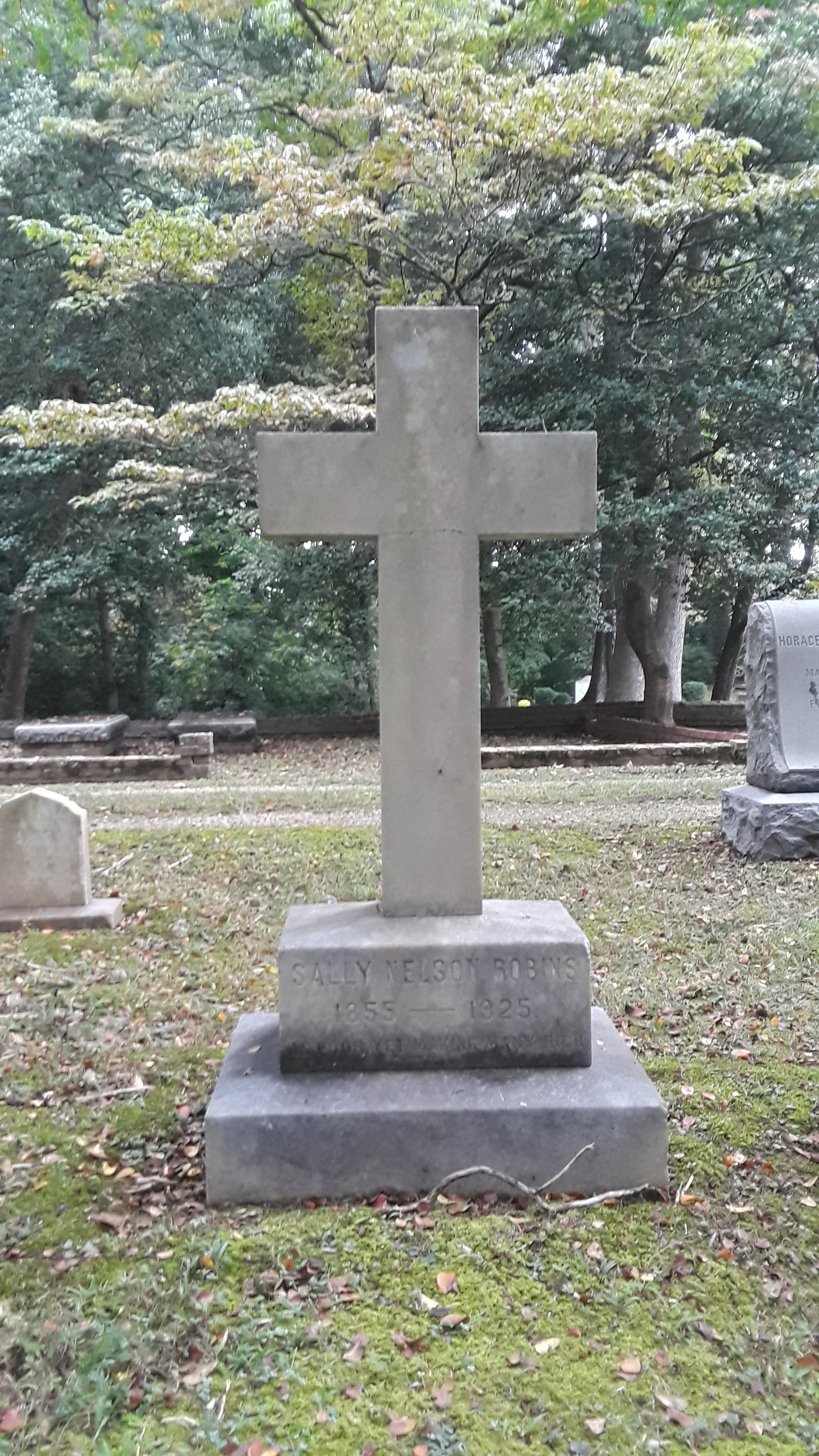
Grave of Sally Nelson Robins

Robins died on February 4, 1925, in Richmond. She was buried at Ware Episcopal Church Cemetery. Her correspondence is held at the New York Public Library.

== Personal life ==
Robins was born on March 18, 1855, in Gloucester County, Virginia. She was descended from Thomas Nelson. She married William Todd Robins in 1878; they had six children, including a son, Augustine Warner Robins. She was the daughter of physician William Wilmer Nelson and Sally B. Catlett Nelson. When she married William Todd Robins in 1878, he was a widowed Confederate cavalry officer with a young daughter, and he died on October 28, 1906, nearly two decades before her. They moved to Richmond.

== Works ==
- History of Gloucester County, Virginia, and its Families. 1893.
- Robins, S.N. (1912). Scuffles. American Fiction, 1774-1920. Alice Harriman Company.
- Robins, S.N. (1916). A Man's Reach. American Fiction, 1774-1920. J. B. Lippincott Company.
- Robins, S.N. (1923). Love Stories of Famous Virginians. Dietz.
