= Robins Air Force Base =

US Air Force base at Warner Robins, Georgia, United States

- Warner Robins, Georgia in the United States of America
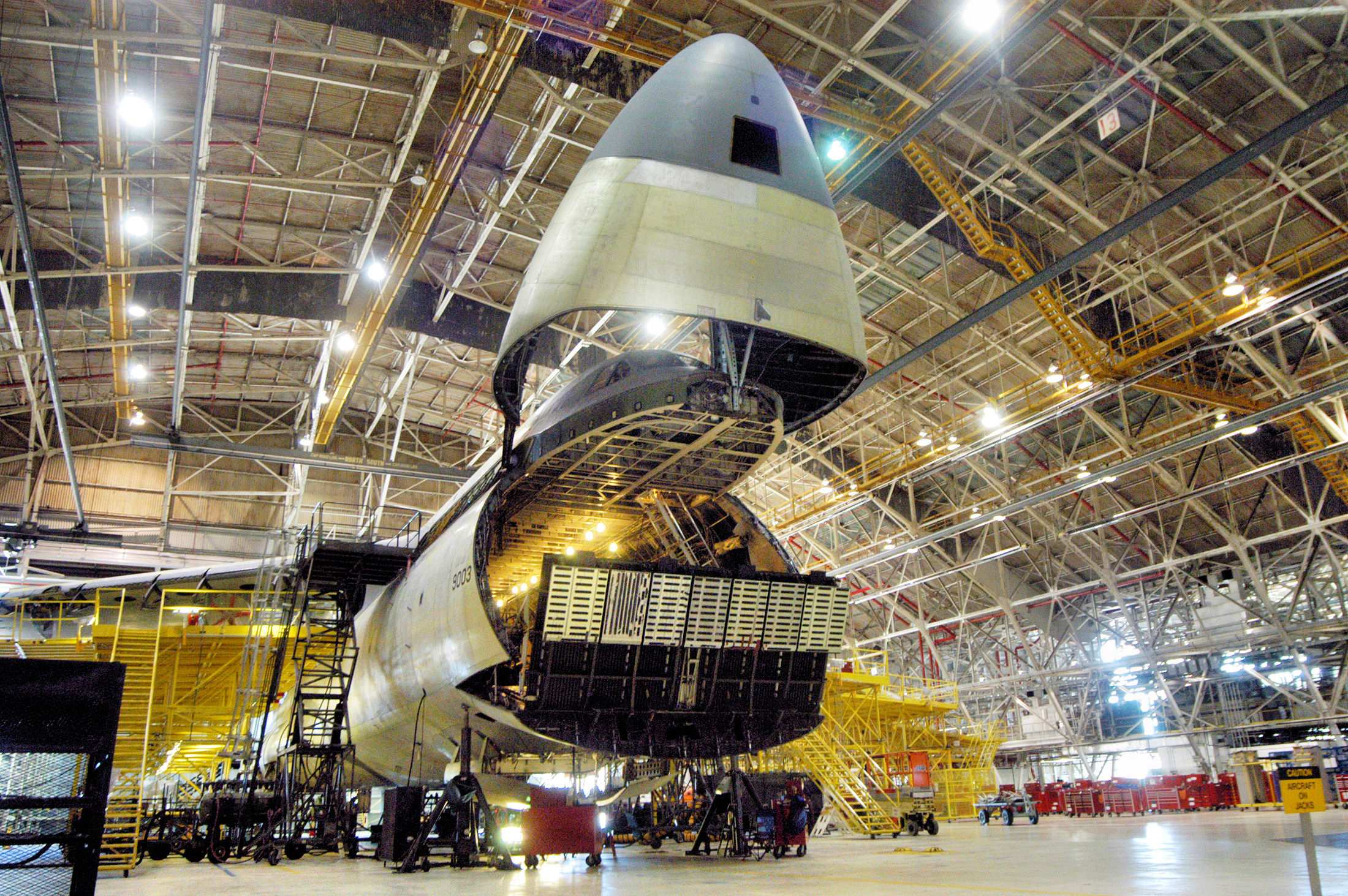
- A C-5 Galaxy undergoing modifications during 2011 at Warner Robins Air Logistics Center.

Site information
- Type: US Air Force Base
- Owner: Department of Defense
- Operator: US Air Force
- Controlled by: Air Force Materiel Command (AFMC)
- Condition: Operational
- Website: www.robins.af.mil

Location
- Location within North America Location within the United States Location within Georgia
- Coordinates: 32°38′24″N 083°35′30″W

Site history
- Built: 1941 – 1942
- In use: 1942 – present

Garrison information
- Current commander: Colonel Lindsay Droz
- Garrison: 78th Air Base Wing (Host)

Airfield information
- Identifiers: IATA: WRB, ICAO: KWRB, FAA LID: WRB, WMO: 722175
- Elevation: 89.6 meters (294 ft) AMSL
Runways
Direction	Length and surface
15/33	3,657.9 meters (12,001 ft) Porous European Mix

Robins Air Force Base (IATA: WRB, ICAO: KWRB) is a major United States Air Force installation located in Houston County, Georgia, United States. The base is located just east of the city of Warner Robins, 18 mi (29 km) south-southeast of Macon and approximately 100 mi (160 km) south-southeast of Atlanta, Georgia. The base is named in honor of Brigadier General Augustine Warner Robins, the Air Force's "father of logistics". The base is the single largest industrial complex in Georgia, employing a workforce of over 25,584 civilian, contractor, and military members.

Robins AFB is the home of the Air Force Materiel Command's Warner Robins Air Logistics Complex (WR-ALC) (FLZ) which is the worldwide manager for a wide range of aircraft, engines, missiles, software and avionics and accessories components. The commander of WR-ALC is Brigadier General David Miller . It is one of three Air Force Air Logistic Complexes, the others being Oklahoma City Air Logistics Complex (OC-ALC) at Tinker Air Force Base, Oklahoma, and Ogden Air Logistics Complex (OO-ALC) at Hill Air Force Base, Utah.

The host unit at Robins AFB is the 78th Air Base Wing (78 ABW) which provides services and support for the Warner Robins Air Logistics Complex and its tenant organizations.

== History ==
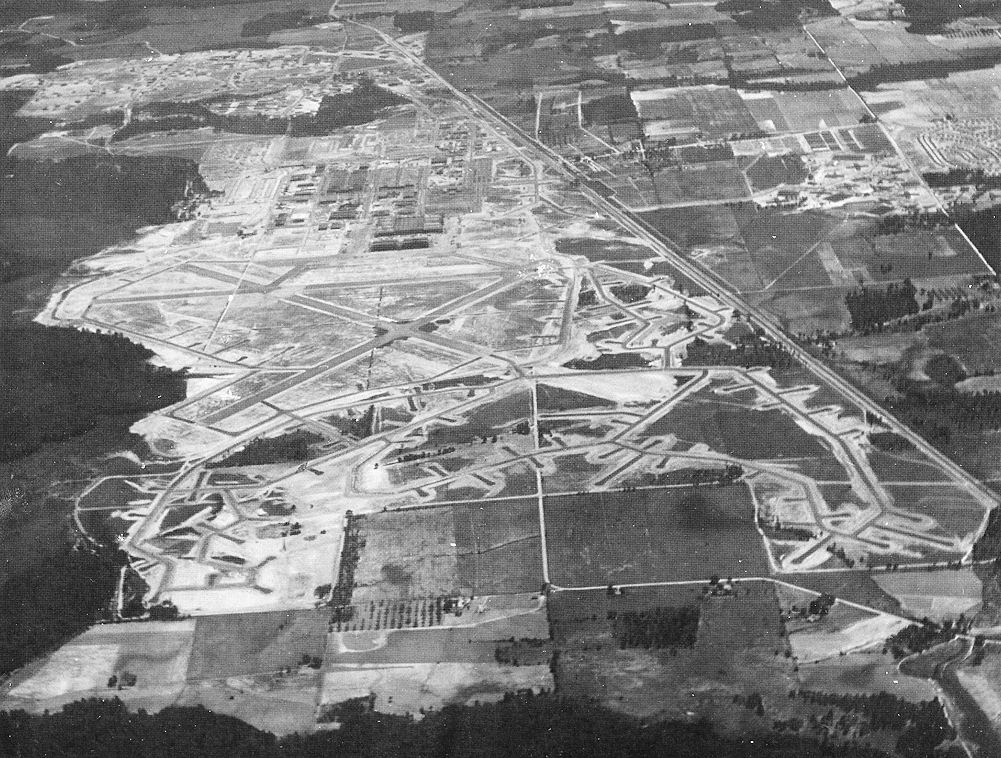
Robins Army Airfield, about 1944

The War Department, in search of a site for an Army Air Corps Depot, selected the sleepy whistle-stop town known as Wellston, Georgia, 18 miles (29 kilometers) south of Macon. Army Colonel Charles Thomas, originally from Atlanta, landed at the Herbert Smart Airport near Camp Wheeler near Macon in October 1941 to oversee the building of the location which would later become the home to Wellston Air Depot at Robins Field (later to become Robins AFB).

It was Col. Thomas who chose the name Robins for his mentor Brig. Gen. Augustine Warner Robins. Brig. Gen. Robins is considered the "father of logistics" in the United States Air Force for his system of cataloging supplies and materials. He had a lengthy military career prior to becoming the chief of the Air Corps Materiel Division. Robins traveled in China disguised as a millionaire tourist, collecting intelligence for the Army. He also went to Mexico where he served under Gen. John J. Pershing in the Army's campaign against Pancho Villa. He trained during World War I to become a pilot earning his wings in June 1918. He didn't get to see combat because the war was ending. Robins suffered a near-fatal plane crash in 1921 in which his jaw and arm were severely broken. Brig. Gen. Robins died of a heart attack on Father's Day, 16 June 1940, at Randolph Field, Texas, while he was Commandant of the Air Corps Training Center.

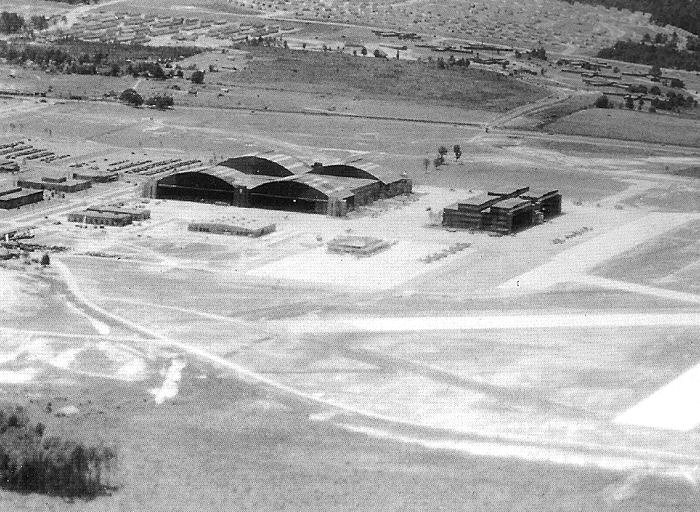
Aerial view of Robins Air Depot aircraft hangar

After World War II, the number of military and civilian employees dropped until in March 1946 it reached a total of only 3,900. The workforce grew again as the base supported the Berlin Airlift, until by 1949 the workforce had grown again to 11,000. When the Air Force closed down its maintenance depots at the former Brookley AFB in Mobile, Alabama, and the former Olmsted AFB in Middleton Township, Pennsylvania, Robins AFB assumed the workload of these depots.

On 28 October 1949, Robins AFB became the headquarters of the 14th Air Force, the numbered air force responsible for administering the Air Force Reserve and the Air National Guard.

Some Robins AFB SAC units went to Guam or Vietnam during the Vietnam War and took part in many of the bombing missions. Maintenance teams from Robins frequently traveled to Southeast Asia to repair severely damaged aircraft. Robins AFB eventually managed the Lockheed C-141, C-7, and the F-15 Eagle as well as modifying the C-130s to the gunship configuration.

Robins played a key role in the Vietnam War (1964–73), supplying troops and materiel through the Southeast Asian Pipeline and modifying AC-119G/K and AC-130 gunships. Also playing a role were the C-141, the C-130, the C-123, and the C-124 cargo aircraft—all maintained at Robins. In 1973 these same C-141s supported the resupply of Israel in the Yom Kippur War. In October 1983, C-130s from Robins supported U.S. forces in the invasion of Grenada.

Between 1977 and 1981, Robins was the air base used by former President Jimmy Carter during his tenure on visits to his hometown of Plains. SAC's B-52s left Robins in 1983 leaving the 19th Wing as the sole SAC unit on the base with its KC-135s.

=== Modern era ===
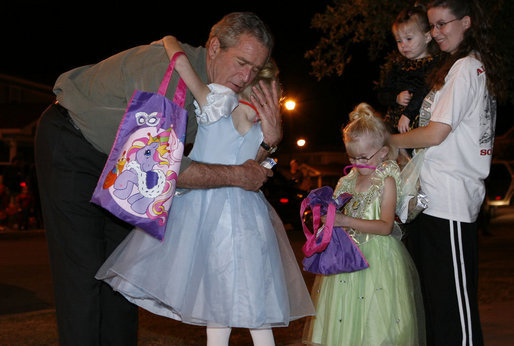
President George W. Bush hugs a trick-or-treater Tuesday, 31 October 2006, during a Halloween visit to a housing development on base.

In 1990–91, during the Persian Gulf War, Robins provided record numbers of parts, repairs, and personnel to coalition forces in the Persian Gulf. Robins-maintained F-15 Eagles and the E-8 Joint STARS played key roles in defeating the Iraqi military powers. In March–June 1999, during Operation Allied Force, the same employees and weapon systems played a decisive role in defeating the forces of the Yugoslavian president Slobodan Milosevic.

In 1996, the Georgia Air National Guard's 116th Fighter Wing at Dobbins AFB relinquished their F-15 aircraft and moved to Robins, transitioning to B-1 Lancer bombers and being redesignated as the 116th Bomb Wing. That same year, the former 93rd Bomb Wing at Robins was reactivated as the 93rd Air Control Wing with the E-8 Joint STARS aircraft. In 2001, the B-1 bombers left Robins AFB and the Georgia Air National Guard entered into a merged Active-Guard "associate" wing arrangement in the Joint STARS mission with the active Air Force, with the Air National Guard holding lead responsibility as the 116th Air Control Wing.

The Warner Robins Air Logistic Complex and Robins AFB form the largest single industrial complex in the State of Georgia. The 23,000 civilian employees have an annual payroll over $1 billion. The Logistic Complex manages and overhauls the F-15, C-5 Galaxy, C-130 Hercules, and the AC-130 gunships—and all of the Air Force's helicopters. In addition, the Complex also supports the C-17 Globemaster III and U-2 aircraft.

Until June 2008, Robins was also the home of the KC-135s of the 19th Air Refueling Group, when the unit was inactivated, then reactivated a month later as the 19th Airlift Wing at Little Rock AFB, Arkansas. The E-8s of the 116th Air Control Wing continue to operate at Robins as a combined Regular Air Force and Georgia Air National Guard air control wing, and the headquarters of the Air Force Reserve Command is also located on the base. The metropolis of Warner Robins, Georgia, has grown in proportion to become the sixth largest city in Georgia.

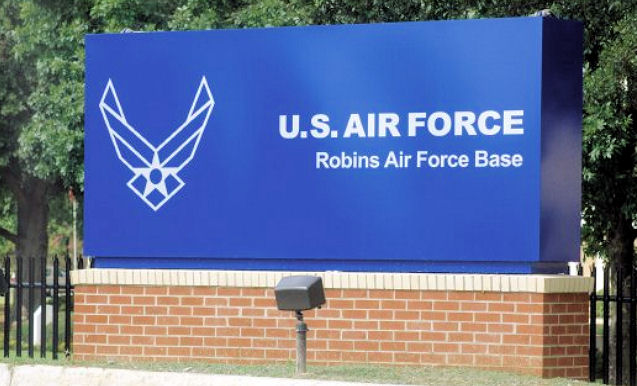
Robins AFB main gate sign

For a brief period, Robins AFB was the home of the C-27J Schoolhouse. The schoolhouse officially began classes at Robins Air Force Base, Georgia on 9 September 2009. L-3 Link (a subsidiary of the former L3 Technologies) operated the official C-27J schoolhouse at the Georgia Department of Defense's Fixed Wing Flight Facility at Robins AFB. This flight facility included training classrooms, computer learning center, a 100-person auditorium, flight planning, and fight operations areas. The facility also housed the resident Government Flight Representative and Aviation Program Team assigned to the C-27J contract. Fixed Wing Flight Facility Robins AFB is also home of Hotel Company, 171st Aviation Regiment, Georgia Army National Guard, flying the cargo delivery Short C-23 Sherpa. The schoolhouse was deactivated when the Air Force divested its C-27J fleet as part of the 2014 National Defense Authorization Act.

On 1 April 2016, an EF-1 tornado ripped through the northeast corner of Centerville and continued over Robins Air Force Base, ripping off hangar roofs.

Robins was one of several filming locations used in the 2020 disaster film Greenland, with the protagonist and his family being sent to the base to be evacuated in advance of a catastrophic comet impact.

=== Major commands ===
- Air Service Command, 22 July 1942

Redesignated: Army Air Forces Materiel and Services Command, 17 July 1944
Redesignated: Army Air Forces Technical Service Command, 31 August 1944
Redesignated: Air Technical Service Command, 1 July 1945
Redesignated: Air Materiel Command, 9 March 1946
Redesignated: Air Force Logistics Command, 1 April 1961 – 1 July 1992

- Air Force Materiel Command, 1 June 1992 – present
- Air Force Reserve Command, 17 February 1997–present

=== Major units assigned ===
- 4th Station Complement Squadron

Operating from Herbert Smart Airport, Macon, Georgia, 11 April 1942 – 18 August 1942
Operating from Robins Field, 18 August 1942 – 4 January 1943

- Wellston Air Depot

Redesignated: Warner Robins Air Depot, 22 June 1942
Redesignated: Warner Robins Depot Area Command, 3 January 1945
Redesignated: Warner Robins Air Service Center, TBD
Redesignated: Warner Robins Air Technical Service Center, TBD
Redesignated: Warner Robins Air Material Area, 21 May 1951
Redesignated: Warner Robins Air Logistics Center, 1 April 1961 – present

- 469th Base HQ and Air Base Sq, 4 January 1943 – 16 June 1943
- HQ Robins Fld, 16 June 1943 – 1 April 1944
- 4117th AAF Base Unit, 3 January 1945

Redesignated: 4117th AF Base Unit, 26 September 1947
Redesignated: HQ, Warner Robins Air Materiel Area, 28 August 1948
Redesignated: HQ, Warner Robins Air Materiel Area, 21 May 1951
Redesignated: HQ, Warner Robins Air Logistics Center, 1 April 1961 – present

- 2104th Air Weather Group (Military Air Transport Service (MATS)), 1 June 1948 – 24 October 1950
- 1727th Air Transport Squadron (MATS), 9 October 1948 – 1 November 1954
- HQ, Fourteenth Air Force, 29 October 1949 – 1 September 1960
- 2853d Air Base Wing, 1 August 1953

Redesignated: 2853d Air Base Gp, 16 October 1964–1994

- 7th Air Transport Squadron (MATS), 18 October 1954 – 8 January 1966
- 4137th Strategic Wing (Strategic Air Command (SAC)), 1 February 1959 – 1 February 1963
- HQ, Continental Air Command, 16 April 1961 – 1 August 1968
- 465th Bombardment Wing (SAC), 1 February 1963 – 25 July 1968
- 58th Military Airlift Squadron (MAC), 6 January 1966 – 15 August 1971
- 19th Bombardment Wing (SAC), 25 July 1968

Redesignated: 19th Air Refueling Wing (SAC), 1 October 1983
Redesignated: 19th Air Refueling Group (Air Mobility Command), 1 July 1996 – 30 September 2008

- HQ, Air Force Reserve (Agency), 1 August 1968

Redesignated: HQ, Air Force Reserve Command (MAJCOM), 17 February 1997 – present

- 78th Air Base Wing, 1 October 1994–present
- 461st Air Control Wing, 2011–present
- 116th Air Control Wing, 1995–present
- 330th Aircraft Sustainment Wing, 2005 – 2010
- 402d Maintenance Wing, 2005 – 2012
- 542d Combat Sustainment Wing, 2005 – 2010

== Role and operations ==
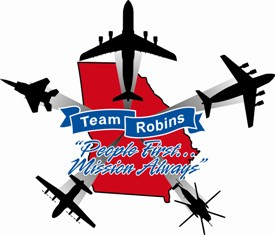
Team Robins Logo

=== Warner Robins Air Logistics Complex ===
Has worldwide management and engineering responsibility for the repair, modification and overhaul of the F-15 Eagle, C-130 Hercules, C-17 Globemaster III, and C-5 Galaxy, C-5M Super Galaxy, Boeing F-15E Strike Eagle, RQ-4A Global Hawk, Sikorsky HH-60G Pave Hawk aircraft. In addition to these weapon systems, the ALC has worldwide management responsibility for the U-2S Dragon Lady, all Air Force helicopters, all special operations aircraft and their peculiar avionics systems. The center also provides logistic support for all the C-17 Globemaster III, Air Force missiles, vehicles, general purpose computers, and many avionics and electronic warfare systems used on most Air Force aircraft.

Through about 7,000 employees, the Warner Robins Air Logistics Complex (WR-ALC) provides depot maintenance, engineering support and software development to major weapon systems [F-15, C-5, C-130, C-17 and Special Operations Forces (SOF) aircraft]. The Complex achieves command objectives providing a capability/capacity to support peacetime maintenance requirements, wartime emergency demands, aircraft battle damage repair and a ready source of maintenance of critical items.

Reorganized on 17 July 2012 from an Air Logistics Center to an Air Logistics Complex, it currently consists of five Groups --- see below.

=== 78th Air Base Wing ===
The wing provides support for Robins AFB and its 39 associate units. Responsible for logistics readiness, medical, civil engineer, security, comptroller activities, contracting, morale and welfare, mission support, public affairs, legal civilian personnel, environmental management, fire emergency services, and emergency management for the installation.

- 78th Mission Support Group
- 78th Medical Group
- 78th Civil Engineer Group
- 78th Security Forces Squadron
- 78th Operations Support Squadron
- 78th Comptroller Squadron
- 78th Communications Directorate

=== 402d Aircraft Maintenance Group (402 AMXG) ===
Provides Programmed Depot Maintenance (PDM) and unscheduled repair activities on F-15, C-130, C-5 and C-17 aircraft. Responsible for the repair, modification, reclamation and rework of over 200 aircraft worldwide. Prepares and deploys combat Aircraft Battle Damage Repair (ABDR), crash recovery and supply and transportation teams worldwide.

=== 402d Commodities Maintenance Group (402 CMXG) ===
Provides depot maintenance support to major weapons systems, primarily F-15, C-5, C-130 and Special Operation Forces (SOF) aircraft, through major structural repair, manufacturing, modification, component and special process repair. Applies industrial engineering and production control programs and procedures.

=== 402d Electronics Maintenance Group (402 EMXG) ===
The organization provides combat-ready avionics parts and services to US warfighting forces. Its production encompasses 75 percent of the Air Force organic workload, consisting of 275 key systems incorporating 6,100 discrete items. It provides depot-level test, maintenance, manufacturing, repair, and engineering capabilities for all Department of Defense Services and Foreign Military Sales.

=== 402d Maintenance Support Group (402 MXSG) ===
Provides logistics support for depot maintenance repair facilities and provides plant facilities, equipment engineering, calibration, and installation support to the wing's infrastructure. The unit is organized into two squadrons: the Industrial Services Squadron, which manages capital investment-related programs; and the Maintenance Materiel Support Squadron, which is responsible for determining, establishing, maintaining, forecasting, and transporting inventory of consumable and exchangeable materiel required for depot maintenance.

=== 402d Software Engineering Group (402 SWEG) ===
Serves as the single organic source of Mission Critical Computer Resources and Automatic Test Equipment software for all assigned prime systems and equipment and for all echelons of maintenance requiring computer programming skills and assembly level computer programming languages. Designs, develops, and provides new, altered, updated, or modified software and updates/corrects existing avionics items/system software. Provides on-site engineering assistance to identify and correct software deficiencies and provides criteria and documentation for automated equipment. Conducts feasibility studies for the application of automation to the depot maintenance process, and serve as the Automatic Test Systems focal point for the wing.

=== Tenant Units ===
- Air Force Reserve Command Headquarters
  - 860th Cyberspace Operations Group
    - 55th Combat Communications Squadron
- 492nd Special Operations Wing (Detachment 1)
- 461st Air Control Wing [ USAF ]
- 116th Air Control Wing [ Georgia ANG ]
  - 202d Engineering Installation Squadron
- 5th Combat Communications Group
- Army Aviation Support Facility Robins AFB
- Hotel Company, 171st Aviation Regiment (C-23 TAC)
- C-27J Aircraft Qualification Schoolhouse
- 94th Aerial Port Squadron
- 367th Recruiting Group
- Robins NCO Academy
- Air Force Metrology and Calibration Program Office (AFMETCAL)

== Based units ==
The following are flying and notable non-flying units based at Robins Air Force Base.

Units marked GSU are Geographically Separate Units, which although based at Robins, are subordinate to a parent unit based at another location.

=== United States Air Force ===
Air Force Materiel Command (AFMC)

- 78th Air Base Wing (Host wing)
  - Headquarters 78th Air Base Wing
  - 78th Comptroller Squadron
  - 78th Operations Support Squadron
  - 78th Civil Engineering Group
    - 78th Civil Engineer Squadron
    - 778th Civil Engineer Squadron
    - Engineering Division
    - Installation Management Division
  - 78th Communications and Information Directorate
    - Special Mission Division
    - Operations Division
    - Resource and Planning Division
  - 78th Medical Group
    - 78th Aerospace Medicine Squadron
    - 78th Medical Operations Squadron
    - 78th Medical Support Squadron
  - 78th Mission Support Group
    - 78th Force Support Squadron
    - 78 Logistics Readiness Squadron
    - 78th Security Forces Squadron
- Air Force Sustainment Center
  - Warner Robins Air Logistics Complex
    - 402nd Aircraft Maintenance Group
      - 402nd Commodities Maintenance Group
      - 402nd Electronics Maintenance Group
      - 402nd Maintenance Support Group
      - 402nd Software Maintenance Group
      - 402nd Business Development & Partnership
  - 448th Supply Chain Management Wing
    - 638th Supply Chain Management Group (GSU)
      - 406th Supply Chain Management Squadron
      - 407th Supply Chain Management Squadron
      - 408th Supply Chain Management Squadron
      - 409th Supply Chain Management Squadron
      - 410th Supply Chain Management Squadron
      - 411th Supply Chain Management Squadron
- Air Force Life Cycle Management Center
  - Armament Directorate
    - Specialized Management Division (GSU)
  - Battle Management Directorate
    - Command & Control, Intelligence, Surveillance and Reconnaissance Program Office (GSU)
    - JSTARS Program Office (GSU)
  - Mobility Directorate
    - C-5 Division (GSU)
    - C-17 Division (GSU)
    - Tactical Air Division (GSU)
  - Fighters/Bombers Directorate
    - F-15 Division (GSU)
  - ISR/SOF Directorate
    - Special Operations Forces/Personnel Recovery Division (GSU)
    - Predator/Reaper Branch (GSU)
    - Global Hawk Branch (GSU)
    - U-2 Division (GSU)

Air Combat Command (ACC)

- Fifteenth Air Force
  - 461st Air Control Wing
    - Headquarters 461st Air Control Wing
    - 461st Operations Group
      - 728th Battle Management Control Squadron
      - 330th Combat Training Squadron
- Sixteenth Air Force
  - 319th Reconnaissance Wing
    - 319th Operations Group
      - 18th Airborne Command and Control Squadron – E-11A BACN (GSU)
  - 688th Cyberspace Wing
    - Headquarters 5th Combat Communications Group (GSU)
      - 5th Combat Communications Support Squadron
      - 51st Combat Communications Squadron
      - 52d Combat Communications Squadron
- United States Air Force Warfare Center
  - 350th Spectrum Warfare Wing
    - Headquarters 950th Spectrum Warfare Group (GSU)
      - 17th Electronic Warfare Squadron
      - 950th Spectrum Warfare Group Detachment 1
      - 950th Spectrum Warfare Group Detachment 2

Air Force Reserve Command (AFRC)

- Headquarters Air Force Reserve Command
- Tenth Air Force
  - 960th Cyberspace Wing
    - Headquarters 860th Cyberspace Operations Group (GSU)
      - 55th Combat Communications Squadron
- Twenty-Second Air Force
  - 94th Airlift Wing
    - 94th Mission Support Group
      - 94th Aerial Port Squadron (GSU)
  - 413th Flight Test Group
    - Headquarters 413th Flight Test Group
    - 339th Flight Test Squadron
    - 413th Aeromedical Staging Squadron
    - 413th Force Support Flight

Air National Guard (ANG)

- Georgia Air National Guard
  - 116th Air Control Wing
    - Headquarters 116th Air Control Wing
    - 116th Operations Group
      - 128th Airborne Command and Control Squadron – E-8C JSTARS
    - 116th Maintenance Group
    - 116th Mission Support Group
    - 116th Medical Group
    - 202d Engineering Installation Squadron

=== United States Army ===
Military Intelligence Corps

- Intelligence and Security Command
  - 116th Military Intelligence Brigade
    - 138th Military Intelligence Company

Army National Guard (ARNG)

- Georgia Army National Guard
  - 78th Aviation Troop Command
    - Army Fixed Wing Support Activity

=== Defense Logistics Agency ===
- DLA Aviation
- DLA Disposition
- DLA Distribution
- DLA Document Services
- DLA Energy facilities

== Museum of Aviation ==
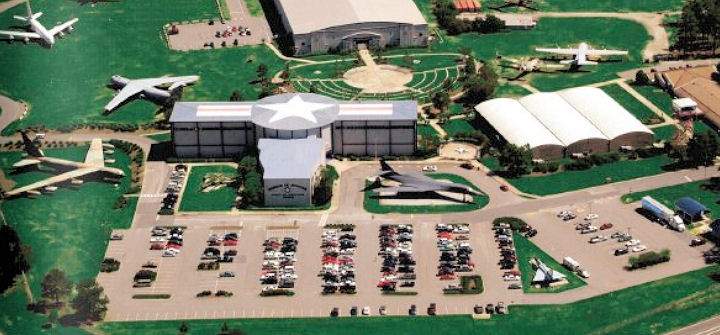
Airphoto of the museum

Near the base, is the Museum of Aviation, begun in 1981, has four major structures on its 51 acres and more than 85 historic aircraft. The museum is also home to the Georgia Aviation Hall of Fame which honors outstanding Georgians prominent in aviation.

The approximate 85 aircraft and missiles on display include a B-1, a B-52, an F-15, an F-16, an SR-71, a Marietta, Georgia-built B-29, and a C-123 modified as a sprayer aircraft that was used by the U.S. military as part of its Agent Orange herbicidal warfare program (Operation Ranch Hand) during the Vietnam War.

It has become a major regional educational and historical resource that hosts more than 500,000 visitors annually.

== Geography ==
The base is located in northeastern Houston County, bordered to the west by the city of Warner Robins. The Ocmulgee River is to the east. It is 17 miles (27 km) south of Macon.

== Demographics ==
Robins Air Force Base CDP
- Census-designated place
- Location within Georgia Location within the United States
- Country: United States
- State: Georgia
- County: Houston
- Elevation: 266 ft (81 m)

Population (2020)
  - Total: 1,061
- Time zone: UTC−6 (Central (CST))
  - Summer (DST): UTC−5 (CDT)
- GNIS feature ID: 2403484

Robins Air Force Base CDP is a census-designated place (CDP) and the official name for an area covering the residential population of the Robins Air Force Base, in Houston County, Georgia, United States. It was first listed as a CDP in the 1980 United States census. The population at the 2020 census was 1,061.

Historical population
Census	Pop.	Note	%±
1980	3,571		—
1990	3,092		−13.4%
2000	3,949		27.7%
2010	1,170		−70.4%
2020	1,061		−9.3%
U.S. Decennial Census; 1970 1980 1990; 2000 2010 2020

Robins AFB CDP, Georgia – Racial and ethnic composition Note: the US Census treats Hispanic/Latino as an ethnic category. This table excludes Latinos from the racial categories and assigns them to a separate category. Hispanics/Latinos may be of any race.
Race / Ethnicity (NH = Non-Hispanic)	Pop 2000	Pop 2010	Pop 2020	% 2000	% 2010	% 2020
White alone (NH)	2,174	791	588	55.05%	67.61%	55.42%
Black or African American alone (NH)	1,263	203	172	31.98%	17.35%	16.21%
Native American or Alaska Native alone (NH)	22	3	6	0.56%	0.26%	0.57%
Asian alone (NH)	98	25	26	2.48%	2.14%	2.45%
Pacific Islander alone (NH)	17	6	0	0.43%	0.51%	0.00%
Some Other Race alone (NH)	25	0	8	0.63%	0.00%	0.75%
Mixed Race or Multi-Racial (NH)	155	34	98	3.93%	2.91%	9.24%
Hispanic or Latino (any race)	195	108	163	4.94%	9.23%	15.36%
Total	3,949	1,170	1,061	100.00%	100.00%	100.00%

As of the 2010 census, the residential population on the base was 1,170, in 231 households, 203 of which were families. There were 245 housing units. The racial makeup of the base residents was 72.6% White, 18.5% Black or African American, 0.3% Native American, 2.1% Asian, 0.6% Pacific Islander, 0.6% some other race, and 5.3% from two or more races. Hispanic or Latino of any race were 9.2% of the population.

72.3% of the households had children under the age of 18 living with them, 75.3% were headed by married couples living together, 7.4% had a female householder with no husband present, and 12.1% were non-families. 11.7% of all households were made up of individuals, and none had someone living alone who was 65 years of age or older. The average household size was 3.33, and the average family size was 3.62.

28.4% of the residential population were under the age of 18, 38.4% were from 18 to 24, 27.5% were from 25 to 44, 5.2% were from 45 to 64, and 0.5% were 65 years of age or older. The median age was 21.5 years. For every 100 females, there were 157.1 males, and for every 100 females age 18 and over, there were 196.1 males.

For the period 2011–15, the estimated median annual income for a household in the base was $62,125, and the median income for a family was $62,375. Male full-time workers had a median income of $28,529 versus $35,500 for females. The per capita income for the base was $20,122. About 7.8% of families and 8.2% of the population were below the poverty line, including 11.4% of those under age 18 and none of those age 65 or over.

== Tornadoes ==
As with the adjacent city of Warner Robins, tornadoes have continually plagued the base since its inception with the 1950s seeing at least two catastrophic tornadoes strike the area. The first one occurred on 30 April 1953, when an F4 tornado with winds of over 200 mph hit the base, killing 18 people near the base and injuring 300 more. Just ten months later on March 13, 1954, a long-tracked F1 tornado struck the base, killing one and injuring five. At least seven tornadoes have hit the base and the surrounding area.

== Amateur radio restrictions ==
The US Code of Federal Regulations specifies that amateur radio operators within 200 kilometers of Robins must not transmit with more than 50 watts of power on the 70-centimeter band.

== Education ==
On-post housing is zoned to the Houston County School District, and this is the school district for dependent children living on-post. The temporary lodging facility is zoned to CB Watson Primary School, Pearl Stephens Elementary School, Huntington Middle School, and Warner Robins High School.

== See also ==
- Air Combat Command
- Air Force Materiel Command
- Air Materiel Command
- Georgia World War II Army Airfields
- Museum of Aviation (Warner Robins)
