= 402nd Maintenance Wing =

- Country: United States
- Branch: Air Force
- Type: Maintenance
- Size: 7,000
- Part of: Air Force Materiel Command; Warner Robins Air Logistics Center
- Garrison/HQ: Robins Air Force Base
- Decorations: Air Force Outstanding Unit Award

Commanders
- Current commander: none -- unit inactivated

Insignia
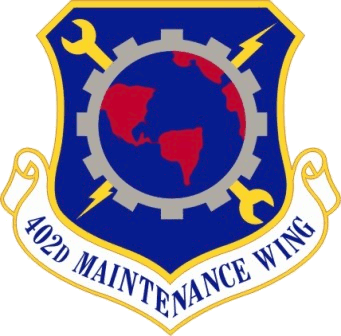
- 402nd Maintenance Wing emblem (approved 25 May 2005)

The 402nd Maintenance Wing, sometimes written as 402d Maintenance Wing, (402 MXW) is an inactive wing of the United States Air Force last based at Robins Air Force Base, Georgia. As a maintenance wing it provided depot maintenance, engineering support, and software development to major weapon systems (F-15 Eagle, C-5 Galaxy, C-130 Hercules, C-17 Globemaster III and Special Operations Forces aircraft).

From 1943 to 1945, RAF Station Warton, 6.9 miles west of Preston, Lancashire, where the 402d Air Depot, later the 402d Base Air Depot, was located, operated as a United States Army Air Forces depot and staging point. Thousands of aircraft were processed at Warton on their way to active service in Great Britain, North Africa, the Mediterranean Theater of Operations, and mainland Europe.

== Lineage ==
- Constituted as the 402d Air Depot on 30 March 1943

Activated on 15 April 1943
Redesignated 402d Base Air Depot on 17 July 1944
Inactivated on 24 November 1945

- Disbanded on 8 October 1948
- Reconstituted and redesignated 402d Maintenance Wing on 31 January 2005

Activated on 4 March 2005
Inactivated on 1 October 2012

=== Assignments ===
- Eighth Air Force (later United States Strategic Air Forces, United States Air Forces Europe), 15 April 1943 – 24 November 1945
- Warner Robins Air Logistics Center (later Warner Robins Air Logistics Complex), 4 March 2005 (attached to Air Force Sustainment Center after 17 July 2012)
- Air Force Sustainment Center, 1 October 2012 – present (inactivated 1 October 2012)

=== Components ===
- 402d Aircraft Maintenance Group, 4 March 2005 – 1 October 2012 (attached to Warner Robins Air Logistics Complex after 17 July 2012)
- 402d Commodities Maintenance Group, 4 March 2005 – 1 October 2012 (attached to Warner Robins Air Logistics Complex after 17 July 2012)
- 402d Electronics Maintenance Group, 4 March 2005 – 1 October 2012 (attached to Warner Robins Air Logistics Complex after 17 July 2012)
- 402d Maintenance Support Group, 4 March 2005 – 1 October 2012 (attached to Warner Robins Air Logistics Complex after 17 July 2012)
- 402d Software Maintenance Group, 4 March 2005 – 1 October 2012 (attached to Warner Robins Air Logistics Complex after 17 July 2012)

=== Stations ===
- RAF Warton (Station 582), Lancashire, 15 April 1943 – 24 November 1945
- Robins Air Force Base, Georgia, 4 March 2005 - 1 October 2012
