= 52d Combat Communications Squadron =

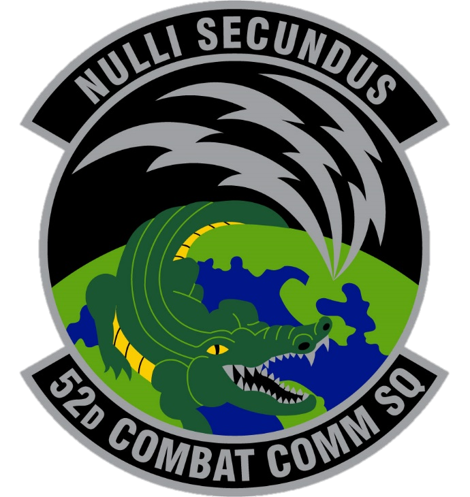
- 52d Combat Comm Sq Emblem
- Active: July 1988 – present
- Country: United States
- Branch: USAF
- Role: Tactical communications
- Size: Squadron
- Part of: 5th Combat Comm Group 461st Air Control Wing; Fifteenth Air Force Air Combat Command
- Garrison/HQ: Robins Air Force Base, Georgia
- Nicknames: 52 CBCS, 5-Deuce, 52d
- Mottos: "Nulli Secundus" translating to "Second to None!"
- Colors: Green
- Mascot: Alligator

Commanders
- Current commander: Lt Col Jessica Zembek

The 52d Combat Communications Squadron is located in Robins Air Force Base, Georgia. It is currently under the command of the 5th Combat Communications Group.

== History ==
The 52d Combat Communications Squadron was constituted on 15 Jul 1988 and activated on 22 Jul 1988. It comprises a Missions Systems Flight (SCM), a Network Operations Flight (SCN), a Special Missions Flight (SCP), and a Support Flight (SCS). All of these work centers together accomplish the 52 CBCS primary mission, which is to rapidly deploy communications in support of the warfighters.

== Lineage ==
- Constituted as the 52d Combat Communications Squadron on 15 July 1988.

Activated on 22 July 1988.

=== Assignment ===
- 5th Combat Communications Group, 22 July 1988

=== Stations ===
- Robins Air Force Base, Georgia, 22 July 1988 – present

=== Awards and campaigns ===
Award streamer	Award	Dates	Notes
	Meritorious Unit Award	1 June 2007–31 May 2009	5th Combat Communications Group
	Meritorious Unit Award	5 October 2009-4 October 2010	5th Combat Communications Group
	Meritorious Unit Award	5 October 2011-4 October 2013	5th Combat Communications Group
	Meritorious Unit Award	5 October 2013-4 October 2015	5th Combat Communications Group
	Air Force Outstanding Unit Award	22 July 1988-31 May 1990	5th Combat Communications Group
	Air Force Outstanding Unit Award	1 October 1990–30 April 1991	5th Combat Communications Group
	Air Force Outstanding Unit Award	28 May 1992-22 February 1993	5th Combat Communications Group
	Air Force Outstanding Unit Award	1 March 1993–31 July 1994	5th Combat Communications Group
	Air Force Outstanding Unit Award	1 June 1998-31 May 2000	5th Combat Communications Group
	Air Force Outstanding Unit Award	1 June 2002–31 May 2003	5th Combat Communications Group
	Air Force Outstanding Unit Award	1 June 2003–31 May 2004	5th Combat Communications Group
	Air Force Outstanding Unit Award	1 June 2004–31 May 2005	5th Combat Communications Group
	Air Force Outstanding Unit Award	1 June 2005–31 May 2007	5th Combat Communications Group
	Air Force Outstanding Unit Award	5 October 2010-4 October 2011	5th Combat Communications Group

Campaign Streamer	Campaign	Phase	Dates	Notes
	Southwest Asia Service Medal	Defense of Saudi Arabia	2 August 1990 – 16 January 1991	5th Combat Communications Group
	Southwest Asia Service Medal	Liberation and Defense of Kuwait	17 January 1991 – 11 April 1991	5th Combat Communications Group
	Global War on Terrorism Service Medal	n/a	-	5th Combat Communications Group
