= Harold M. McClelland =

United States Air Force general (1893–1965)

Harold Mark McClelland
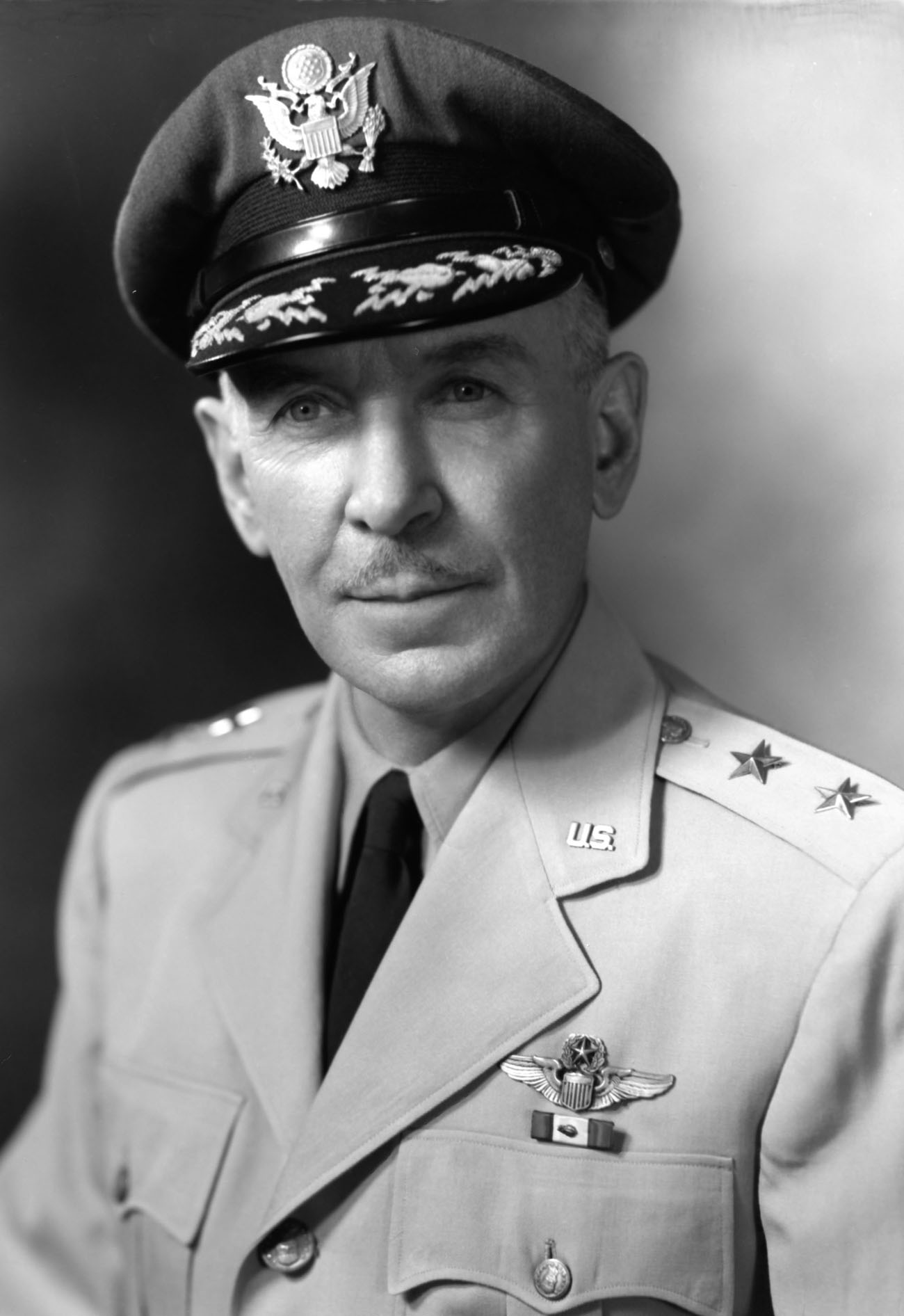
- McClelland c. 1940s
- Born: November 4, 1893; Tiffin, Iowa
- Died: November 19, 1965 (aged 72) Washington, D.C.
- Buried: Arlington National Cemetery
- Allegiance: United States
- Branch: U.S. Army Air Service; U.S. Army Air Corps; U.S. Army Air Forces; United States Air Force; Central Intelligence Agency
- Service years: 1917–1951
- Rank: Major general
- Commands: 19th Bombardment Group; Rockwell Field; Airways and Air Communications Service
- Conflicts: World War II
- Awards: Distinguished Service Medal; Legion of Merit; Commander of the Order of the British Empire
- Education: Kansas State Agricultural College

Harold Mark McClelland (November 4, 1893 – November 19, 1965) was a United States Air Force (USAF) major general who is considered the father of Air Force communications. He founded and led the 19th Bombardment Group in the early 1930s, commanded Rockwell Field for a year then was groomed for higher leadership, becoming the inspector for the General Headquarters Air Force (GHQ) in 1937.

Between 1934 and 1938, McClelland researched the technical and logistical aspects of long-range air communications, an effort which resulted in the establishment of the Army Airways Communications System. Following this, he worked in the Operations and Training Division of the War Department General Staff, and served as chief of the Aviation division.

During World War II, McClelland organized the largest communications system the world had yet seen. McClelland, rated a command pilot, served as the chief of communications for the Central Intelligence Agency in the early 1950s.

In the USAF, an award is given annually in McClelland's name, for excellence in large unit communications.

== Early career ==
Harold Mark McClelland was born in Tiffin, Iowa, in 1893. His siblings included two sisters and a younger brother, Herbert. McClelland graduated from Kansas State Agricultural College with a Bachelor of Science degree in 1916. He was commissioned as a regular second lieutenant August 18, 1917 and was promoted to first lieutenant at the same time.

McClelland was assigned successively to the Army service schools at Fort Leavenworth, Kansas. His electronics-minded brother Herbert "Mac" McClelland was attending nearby Kansas State and the two young men built the first radio transmitter at the college in 1918, stringing an antenna from the Physics building to a water tower. The station 9YV transmitted in Morse code, and may have broadcast the first regularly scheduled weather reports in the U.S. On November 19, 1918, McClelland joined the 48th Infantry at Norfolk, Virginia.

Detailed to the Aviation Section of the Signal Corps, McClelland earned his wings by attending ground school at the University of Texas, flying gunnery and advanced fighter courses at Rockwell Field in San Diego, California. Then followed an assignment at Roosevelt Field, New York, and in December 1918, he became commandant of training, commanding officer of the cadet detachment and assistant engineering officer at Love Field, Dallas, Texas.

In July 1919, McClelland was stationed at London, England as assistant aviation officer, Headquarters of the Provisional District of Great Britain, at the rank of captain. In September, with fellow Air Service pilot Lieutenant Colonel James E. Chaney, he was made an honorary member of the Royal Aero Club of the UK. He also saw service in England with the U.S. Army Liquidation Mission, and collected some advanced "voice radio" equipment from France to take back home for a demonstration in Manhattan. McClelland sailed from London aboard the RMS Saxonia as an unmarried member of the ship's crew, arriving in New York on December 1, 1920.

== Communications ==
In January 1921, McClelland attended the Air Service Communications School at Fort Sill, Oklahoma, and after graduation, remained there as an instructor. In February 1922, he was assigned to the Signal Corps radio laboratory at Camp Alfred Vail, New Jersey, as Air Service representative and from August 1922 to February 1924, was officer in charge of the laboratory.

Transferred to Mitchel Field, New York, in September 1924, with the 9th Observation Group, McClelland was posted signal officer and instructor in communications at summer training camps. From September 1925 to May 1926, he attended a special radio course at Columbia University. While stationed in New York, McClelland agreed to fly a publicity stunt intended to bring more attention to the United States Army Air Corps (USAAC), and aid the Citizens Military Training Camp. Enthusiastic Air Corps booster Major Benjamin Foulois, commander of Mitchel Field, arranged for a USAAC pilot to fly over and drop baseballs for Babe Ruth to catch. Ruth came out to Mitchel Field on July 22, 1926, dressed up in an Army uniform (he was in the Reserves) to keep his end of the bargain. In the sweltering heat and humidity of a Long Island summer, in front of a row of newspaper and film cameramen, as well as radio and print reporters, McClelland flew over Ruth at a speed of 100 miles per hour (160 km/h) and a height of about 250 to 300 feet (76 to 91 m). Foulois recalled that the first two baseballs that McClelland dropped near Ruth "knocked him flat" but that the third ball was caught with a shout of pain and then handed to the major. Foulois wrote in 1980: "The last I saw of the Babe that day he was slowly flexing his burning hand and trying to smile about it as he left in a big limousine."

On October 1, 1927, McClelland began a four-year stint in the Training and Operations Division, Office of the Chief of the USAAC, at Washington, D.C. He then was given command of the 19th Bombardment Group, which he organized in 1931 and commanded until 1934.

He drew two unusual assignments in 1934. When the USAAC took over flying the air mail, McClelland acted as zone communications officer at Salt Lake City. Later in the year, he was communications and meteorological officer for General Henry H. Arnold's Alaskan flight, which was to do much in shaping the trend of air communications.

In October 1934, McClelland was given command of Rockwell Field and Rockwell Air Depot. In 1935 he began a series of courses, which saw him graduate from the Air Corps Tactical School, the Chemical Warfare School and the Command and General Staff School. In 1937 he became inspector for the General Headquarters Staff School. In 1937 he became inspector for the General Headquarters Air Force at Langley Field, Virginia.

At the request of General Arnold, from 1934 to 1938, McClelland worked to devise a permanent airways communication system. In 1938, McClelland's efforts yielded the establishment of the Army Airways Communications System, a group that would develop into the Air Force Network Integration Center.

In August 1938, McClelland was assigned to the Operations and Training Division of the War Department General Staff, Washington, D.C. at the rank of lieutenant colonel, and became chief of Aviation Branch of that division February 21, 1941. In May 1941, McClelland, now colonel, was assigned as assistant chief of staff for operations and training of the Special Army Observer Group in London, England, and after the direct participation of the United States in World War II he retained the same role as assistant chief of staff, training and operations, but within the new European Theater of Operations, United States (ETOUSA), and at the rank of brigadier general.

McClelland returned to the U.S. in July 1942 and was assigned to Headquarters Army Air Forces, Washington, D.C., where he was director of technical services until March 1943. He worked with Fred Terman to determine how best to conduct radio frequency searches and jamming of enemy communications. After serving the next several months as deputy assistant chief of Air Staff, operations, Headquarters Army Air Forces, he became the air communications officer in July 1943.

== Postwar ==
McClelland wrote an article for Bell Telephone Magazine in 1945, entitled "In The Air," describing military communications as used by Air Force units in the successful prosecution of the war.

In January 1946, McClelland reported for newspaper and radio audiences that the recent radar contact with the Moon could well be an "opening step" in the search for life in space.

On April 8, 1946, McClelland became the first commanding general of the Airways and Air Communications Service, the group he had originally formed in 1938 as the Army Airways Communications System. On April 24, 1946, he was made commander of the Airways and Air Communications Service Alumni Association.

Upon creation of the Military Air Transport Service, June 6, 1948, McClelland was named deputy commander, services. These services included Airways and Air Communications Service, Air Weather Service, Air Rescue Service, Flight Service and National Interest Bases. In addition to his new duties, he continued as commanding general of Airways and Air Communications Service until September 10, 1948.

McClelland authored an essay about how radar affected the recent war—a work which was included in Volume 7: Bombs Away—Your Air Force in Action of the Pictorial History of the Second World War, published in 1948. On August 7, McClelland read over the CBS Radio Network a 15-minute speech he had prepared for the radio series Adventures in Science. McClelland's broadcast was entitled "Thunder and Lightning Flying." McClelland stepped down as commander of AACS Alumni Association on September 9, 1948.

On August 30, 1949, McClelland was appointed director of communications-electronics in the United States Department of Defense for the Joint Chiefs of Staff, with station at Washington, D.C.

In 1951, a sharp increase in diplomatic tensions was seen by the Central Intelligence Agency (CIA) as the precursor to war. A greater volume of communications required a stronger system, and CIA Director Walter Bedell Smith hired McClelland as chief of CIA communications, a position known as "Assistant Director, Communications", on September 10, 1951. There, McClelland oversaw the technical development and implementation of a secure global communications system. He served the CIA for 14 years until his death in Washington, D.C., in 1965. McClelland was survived by his wife Doris C. McClelland, and by their son Alan J. McClelland of Houston, Texas. McClelland's brother Herbert "Mac" McClelland continued to thrive as the founder and president of McClelland Sound in Wichita, Kansas, with clients that included McConnell Air Force Base and area businesses Boeing and Learjet.

== Recognition ==
McClelland was awarded the Distinguished Service Medal, the Legion of Merit and Commander of the Order of the British Empire. His DSM citation reads, "... as air communications officer, Headquarters Army Air Forces from July 1942 to August 1945, [he] supervised the Army Airways Communications System which furnished communications and navigational aids along the military air routes throughout the world. He pioneered in military electronics, analyzed the enemy's scientific research in this field and instituted radio and radar countermeasures."

In 1951, the Institute of Electrical and Electronics Engineers (IEEE) awarded McClelland the Pioneer Award.

In honor of his work in military communications, the "Air Force Communications and Information Major General Harold M. McClelland Award" is given annually to the large USAF unit (301 or more members) which has demonstrated "sustained superior performance and professional excellence while managing core communications and information functions and for contributions that most improved communications and information support to Air Force and (or) DoD operations and missions."

McClelland Hall, used by the 333rd Training Squadron on Keesler Air Force Base, is named in his honor.
