= Government Flight Representative =

A Government Flight Representative (GFR) is a US Military Officer or similarly qualified US Government Civilian with the responsibility for aircraft operations conducted by commercial contractors using Department of Defense (DoD) aircraft.

== Authority ==
GFR authority derives from two Defense Federal Acquisition Regulation Supplement (DFARS) contract clauses known as the Ground and Flight Risk Clause and the Flight Risk Clause. Any DoD contract involving the production, modification, maintenance, repair, or overhaul of aircraft must contain one of these two clauses which requires the US Government to assign a GFR to oversee the contractor's operations. These two clauses serve to both indemnify the contractor (reducing program expenses) and also to help protect the assets.

== Qualifications ==
A GFR must be a current military aircraft crewmember or be a US Government Civilian with previous military aircraft experience. A week-long qualification course (operated by the Defense Contract Management Agency) must be completed.

== Responsibilities ==
Before commencing any work, the contractor must develop a core set of operating procedures intended to reduce the probability of industrial accidents. These procedures will be reviewed by the GFR to ensure that they will help to reduce risk to the aircraft during the contracted period. The GFR also has sole authority for the final flight release following the contracted work. The procedural standards that must be met by the contractor is contained in a DoD Joint Instruction titled Contractor's Flight and Ground Operations. Throughout each year, the GFR will conduct periodic assessments of the contractor's operations to ensure compliance with the approved procedures.
