= Warner Robins Air Logistics Complex =

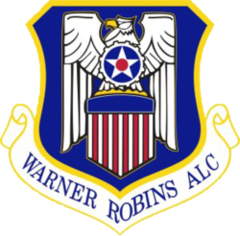
- Complex badge
- Active: 1941–present
- Country: United States
- Branch: United States Air Force
- Type: Air Logistics Complex
- Role: Logistics, support, maintenance and distribution
- Size: 7,000 personnel
- Part of: Air Force Sustainment Center
- Headquarters: Robins Air Force Base, Georgia

Commanders
- Current commander: Brigadier General Jon A. Eberlan

The Warner Robins Air Logistics Complex (WR-ALC), through about 7,000 employees at Robins Air Force Base, Georgia, provides depot maintenance, engineering support and software development to major weapon systems [F-15, C-5, C-130, C-17 and Special Operations Forces (SOF) aircraft]. The Complex achieves command objectives providing a capability/capacity to support peacetime maintenance requirements, wartime emergency demands, aircraft battle damage repair and a ready source of maintenance of critical items.

Reorganized on 17 July 2012 from an Air Logistics Center to an Air Logistics Complex, it currently consists of five Groups --- see below.

== Organization ==
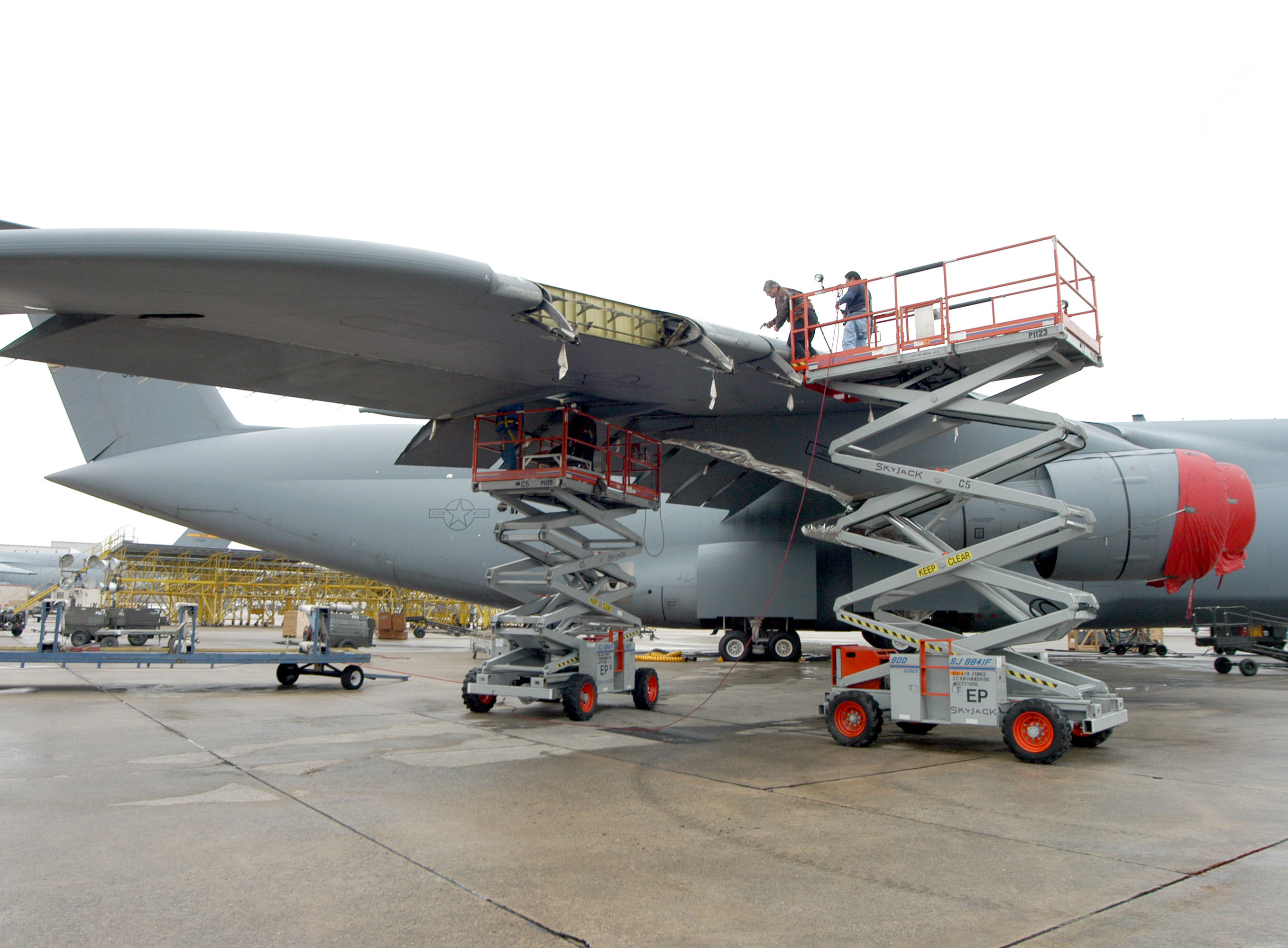
A missile-damaged C-5 Galaxy receives repair of battle damage at Warner Robins

The 78th Air Base Wing, the host organization at Robins AFB, provides support facilities and equipment for all Robins Air Force Base associate units. It is responsible for logistics, medical, civil engineering, security, and morale services for a base population of approximately 23,000 personnel.

402d Aircraft Maintenance Group (402 AMXG): Provides Programmed Depot Maintenance (PDM) and unscheduled repair activities on F-15, C-130, C-5 and C-17 aircraft. Responsible for the repair, modification, reclamation and rework of over 200 aircraft worldwide. Prepares and deploys combat Aircraft Battle Damage Repair (ABDR), crash recovery and supply and transportation teams worldwide.

402d Commodities Maintenance Group (402 CMXG): Provides depot maintenance support to major weapons systems, primarily F-15, C-5, C-130 and Special Operations Forces (SOF) aircraft, through major structural repair, manufacturing, modification, component and special process repair. Applies industrial engineering and production control programs and procedures.

402d Electronics Maintenance Group (402 EMXG): Provides combat-ready avionics parts and services to our warfighting forces. Production encompasses 75 percent of the Air Force organic workload, consisting of 275 key systems incorporating 6,100 discrete items. Transformed capability into effects through outstanding depot-level test, maintenance, manufacturing, repair, and engineering capabilities for all Department of Defense Services and Foreign Military Sales.

402d Maintenance Support Group (402 MXSG): Provides logistics support for depot maintenance repair facilities and provides plant facilities, equipment engineering, calibration, and installation support to the Complex's infrastructure. The unit is organized into two squadrons: the Industrial Services Squadron, which manages capital investment-related programs; and the Maintenance Materiel Support Squadron, which is responsible for determining, establishing, maintaining, forecasting, and transporting inventory of consumable and exchangeable materiel required for depot maintenance.

402d Software Engineering Group (402 SWEG): Serves as the single organic source of Mission Critical Computer Resources and Automatic Test Equipment software for all assigned prime systems and equipment and for all echelons of maintenance requiring computer programming skills and assembly level computer programming languages. Designs, develops, and provides new, altered, updated, or modified software and updates/corrects existing avionics items/system software. Provides on-site engineering assistance to identify and correct software deficiencies and provides criteria and documentation for automated equipment. Conducts feasibility studies for the application of automation to the depot maintenance process, and serve as the Automatic Test Systems focal point for the Complex.

== History ==
Construction began on (what has become) the Warner Robins Air Logistics Complex in mid-1941. During World War II the organization took on a number of roles focusing on aircraft procurement and sustainment. Through the course of the war the center trained more than a quarter of a million maintenance, supply, and logistics personnel who went on to serve in every theater of operations.

During the post-World War II draw-down the number of personnel working at the center was reduced to about 3,900. However, as the Cold War began to take shape with the Berlin Airlift and shortly after with the Korean War the center quickly ramped up its capabilities. Warner Robins personnel focused on refurbishing mothballed B-29 Superfortress aircraft for use in Korea. The center also provided material support to U.S. forces engaged in the Vietnam War. It managed B-57 Canberra, AC-119, and AC-130 aircraft. Additionally, it was responsible for most of the U.S. Air Force's airlift fleet, including the C-123 Provider, C-124 Globemaster II, C-130 Hercules, and C-141 Starlifter.

More recently the center directly supported Operations Desert Shield and Desert Storm by deploying some of its members to Europe and the Persian Gulf area to assist with aircraft maintenance. Currently the center provides depot maintenance on the Air Force's entire fleet of helicopters and special operations aircraft in addition to both strategic and tactical airlift aircraft and the F-15 Eagle and U-2 Dragon Lady airframes.

== Lineage ==
Established as Warner Robins Air Depot Control Area Command on 19 Jan 1943. Activated on 1 Feb 1943. Redesignated as: Warner Robins Air Service Command on 17 May 1943; Warner Robins Air Technical Service Command on 14 Nov 1944; Warner Robins Air Materiel Area on 2 Jul 1946; Warner Robins Air Logistics Center on 1 Apr 1974; Warner Robins Air Logistics Complex on 17 Jul 2012 to present.
