= Assault Breaker =

System for precision guided munitions

Assault Breaker was a Defense Advanced Research Projects Agency (DARPA) program begun in 1978 to integrate a number of technologies including lasers, electro-optical sensors, microelectronics, data processors and radars important for precision guided munitions (PGMs).

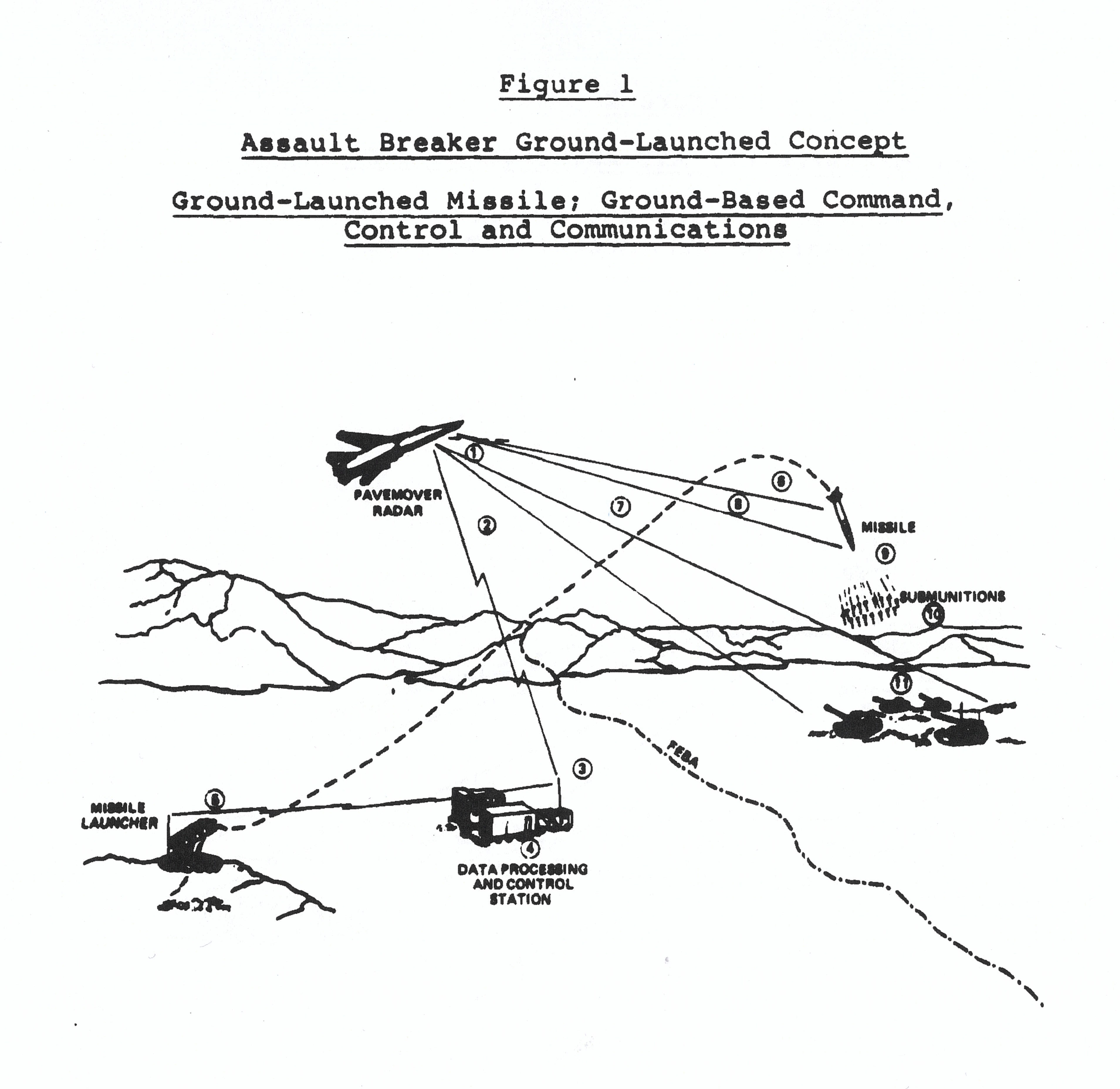
Assault Breaker ground launch

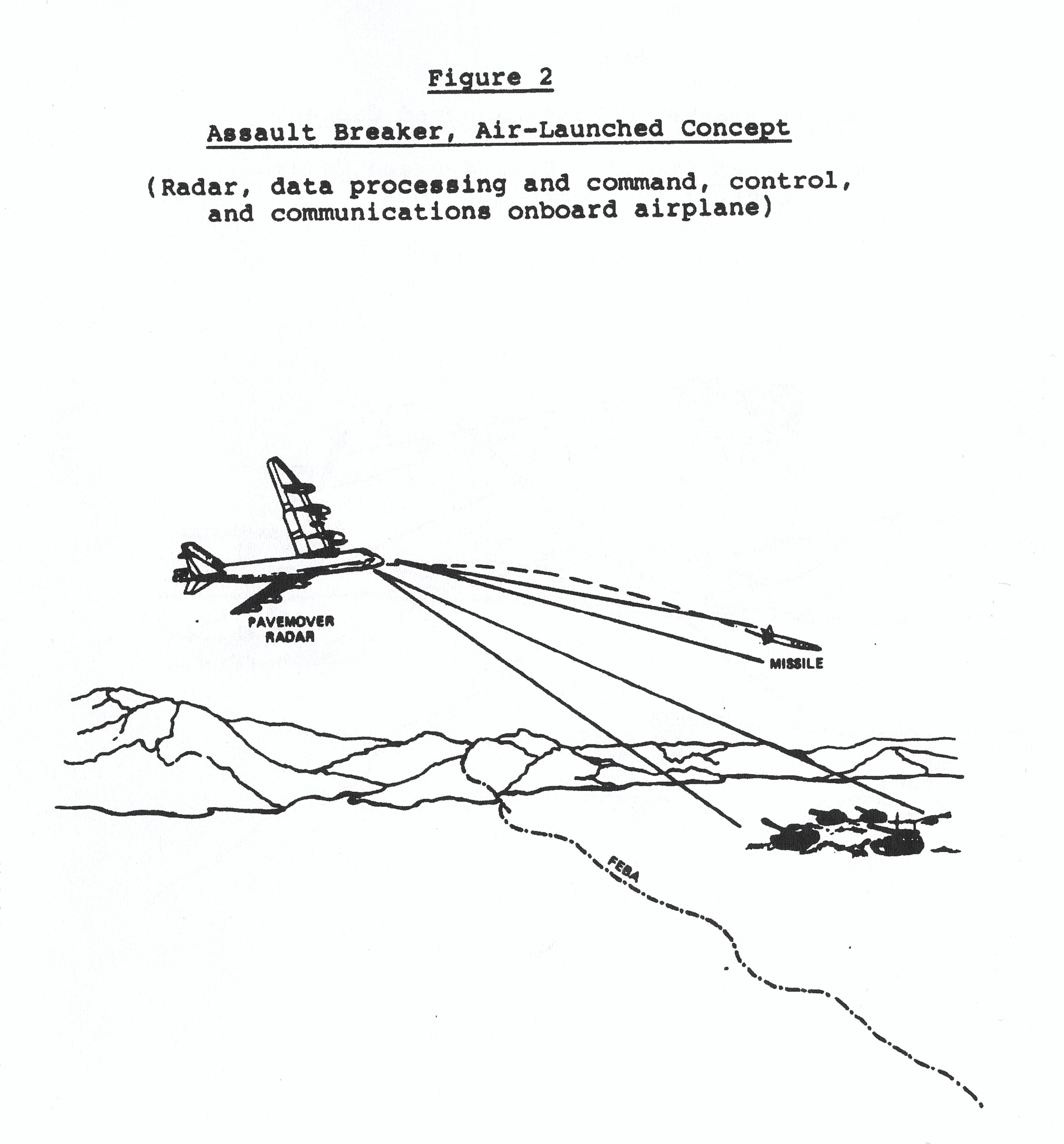
Assault Breaker air launch

Assault Breaker was conceived to attack moving, rear echelon armor massed deep behind enemy lines. At the time the program commenced the only means for attacking these targets was by the use of manned, penetrating aircraft. The perceived advantage of Assault Breaker was that it would permit attacking these targets with standoff weapons. Assault Breaker was conceived to obtain a uniquely high kill rate at a much smaller risk and cost than existing tactics permitted. United States Department of Defense officials believed that Assault Breaker's fire rate could destroy in a few hours sufficient vehicles in Warsaw Pact reinforcement divisions to prevent their exploiting a breakthrough at the forward edge of battle area. Two modes of delivering Assault Breaker munitions were considered, ground-launched and air-launched missiles. Assault Breaker involved the use of an airborne radar, airborne or surface launchers, strike missiles with submunition dispensers, self-guided submunitions that are dispensed over the target and a communications, command and control network to link the target acquisition, data transmission and strike functions.

The program had four phases:

- The first phase involved a focussed effort on the component technologies - verifying that they really were available and that their performance estimates added up to a feasible overall concept.
- The second phase involved testing most of the critical component technologies in parallel and making further developments as necessary. At least two contractors were involved in all the tests and developments. Thus, there were two different approaches, by Hughes Aircraft Company and Norden Systems, to the Pave Mover radar system and for the related ground processing stations; two "missile bus" contractors, Martin Marietta for the Patriot (T16) and Ling-Temco-Vought for the Lance (T22) missile; and two subminitions contractors, General Dynamics for the TGSM and AVCO for the SKEET. Submunitions components were tested individually, with emphasis on the required dispensing and homing properties.
- In the third phase gradually more complex degrees of system integration were tested. Missile flight tests were conducted, first with inertial guidance only: the T16 used a Stellar-sight gyro update and the T22 used an Army-developed optical laser gyro. Later, radar guidance, ground and airborne, was used to steer the missile. Both missiles qualified successfully, achieving the desired accuracies. After this, tests were made including integration of the submunitions with the missile, along with increased complexity in the command signals directing the time, location, and characteristics of submunitions release.
- In the last phase of the program, tests of the combined airborne radar-missile submunitions systems were conducted against some tank targets at White Sands Missile Range. The final tests (which involved a ground-based radar simulating the Pave Mover) in late 1982 had several failures; but in the last test five TGSMs made five direct hits, one on each tank in a pattern of five stationary tanks. The SKEETs however did not achieve any hits.

The major technological features had been demonstrated by the DARPA program, proof of concept was established and a decision could have been made to enter full scale engineering development if the services had adopted Assault Breaker as a system.

DARPA outlays for Assault Breaker and related previous studies from project records appear to have been about $155 million; for Pave Mover about $50 million.

Over a four-year period, Assault Breaker laid the technological foundation for several smart-weapon systems that were ultimately fielded. Among these systems were the Joint Surveillance Target Attack Radar System (JSTARS), which integrated PGMs with advanced intelligence, surveillance and reconnaissance (ISR) systems developed with DARPA support; the Global Hawk unmanned aerial vehicles; a United States Air Force air-to-ground missile with terminally guided submunitions; the Army Tactical Missile System (ATACMS), which featured all-weather, day/night capability effective against mobile and other targets; and the Brilliant Anti-Tank (BAT) submunition, which used acoustic sensors on its wings to detect and target tanks.

DARPA's Assault Breaker II is designed to stunt adversaries' advances early in a conflict through multi-domain operations, similar to the original Assault Breaker program. It is a set of "new warfighting operational constructs based on new and emerging technologies and capabilities" and reportedly would focus on ships, air defenses, headquarters, tanks, supply depots, and other critical assets.
