= Northrop Tacit Blue =

Experimental 1980s USAF aircraft

Tacit Blue
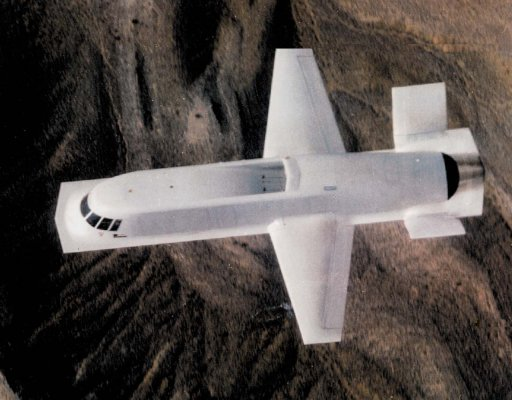
- Northrop Tacit Blue in flight

General information
- Type: Stealth demonstrator
- Manufacturer: Northrop Corporation
- Status: Retired
- Primary user: United States Air Force
- Number built: 1

History
- First flight: February 5, 1982
- Retired: 1985

The Northrop Tacit Blue is a technology demonstrator aircraft created to demonstrate that a low-observable stealth surveillance aircraft with a low-probability-of-intercept radar (LPIR) and other sensors could operate close to the forward line of battle with a high degree of survivability.

== Development ==
Unveiled by the U.S. Air Force on 30 April 1996, the Tacit Blue Technology Demonstration Program was designed to prove that such an aircraft could continuously monitor the ground situation deep behind the battlefield and provide targeting information in real time to a ground command center.

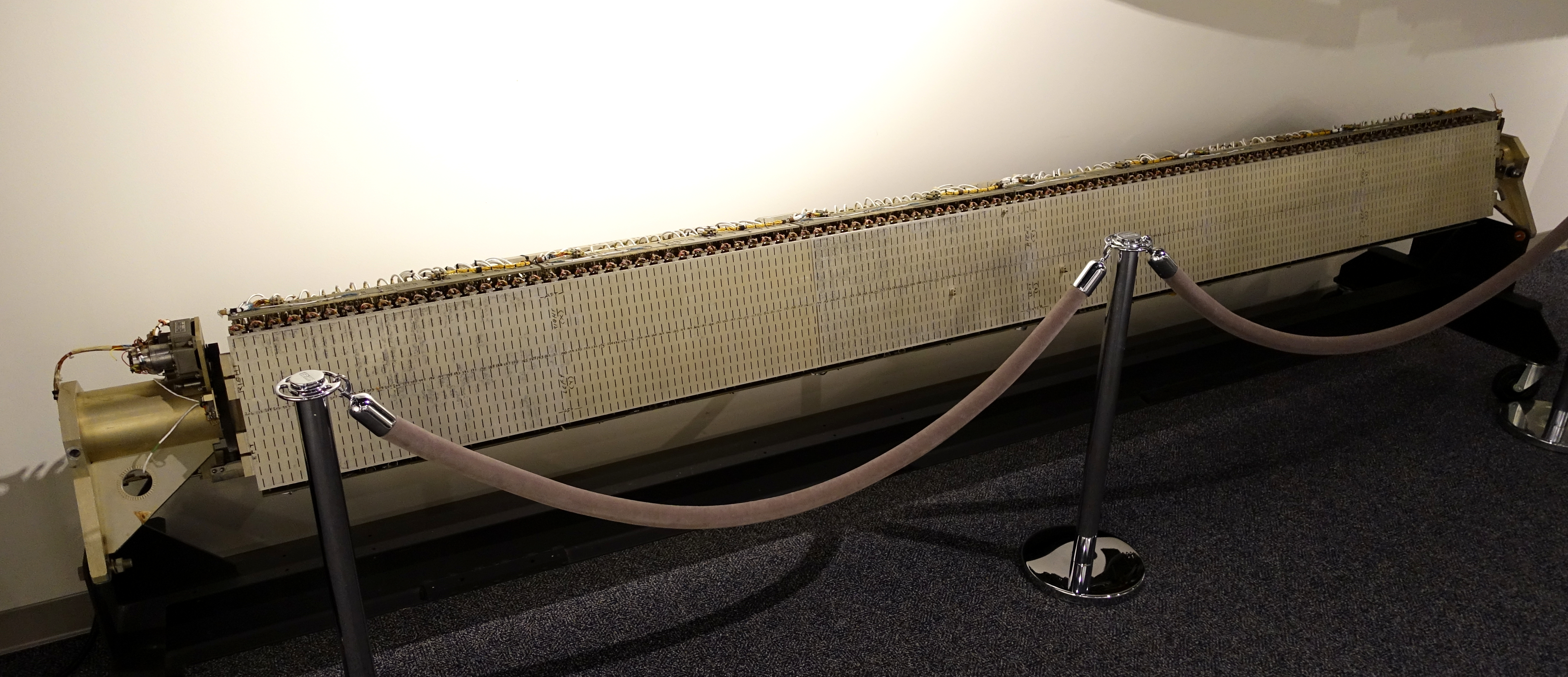
Pave Mover radar antenna

In December 1976, DARPA and the U.S. Air Force initiated the Battlefield Surveillance Aircraft-Experimental (BSAX) program, which was part of a larger Air Force program called Pave Mover. The BSAX program's goal was to develop an efficient stealth reconnaissance aircraft with a low probability of intercept radar and other sensors that could operate close to the forward line of battle with a high degree of survivability.

Tacit Blue represented the "black" component in the larger "Assault Breaker" program, which intended to validate the concept of massed standoff attacks on advancing armored formations using smart munitions. The Pave Mover radar demonstrators provided the non-stealth portion of the program's targeting system, whereas Tacit Blue was intended to demonstrate a similar but stealth capability, while validating a number of innovative stealth technology advances.

The radar sensor technology developed for Tacit Blue evolved into the radar that was used by the E-8 Joint STARS aircraft.

Tacit Blue was given the cover designation of "YF-117D" by the Air Force.

== Design ==
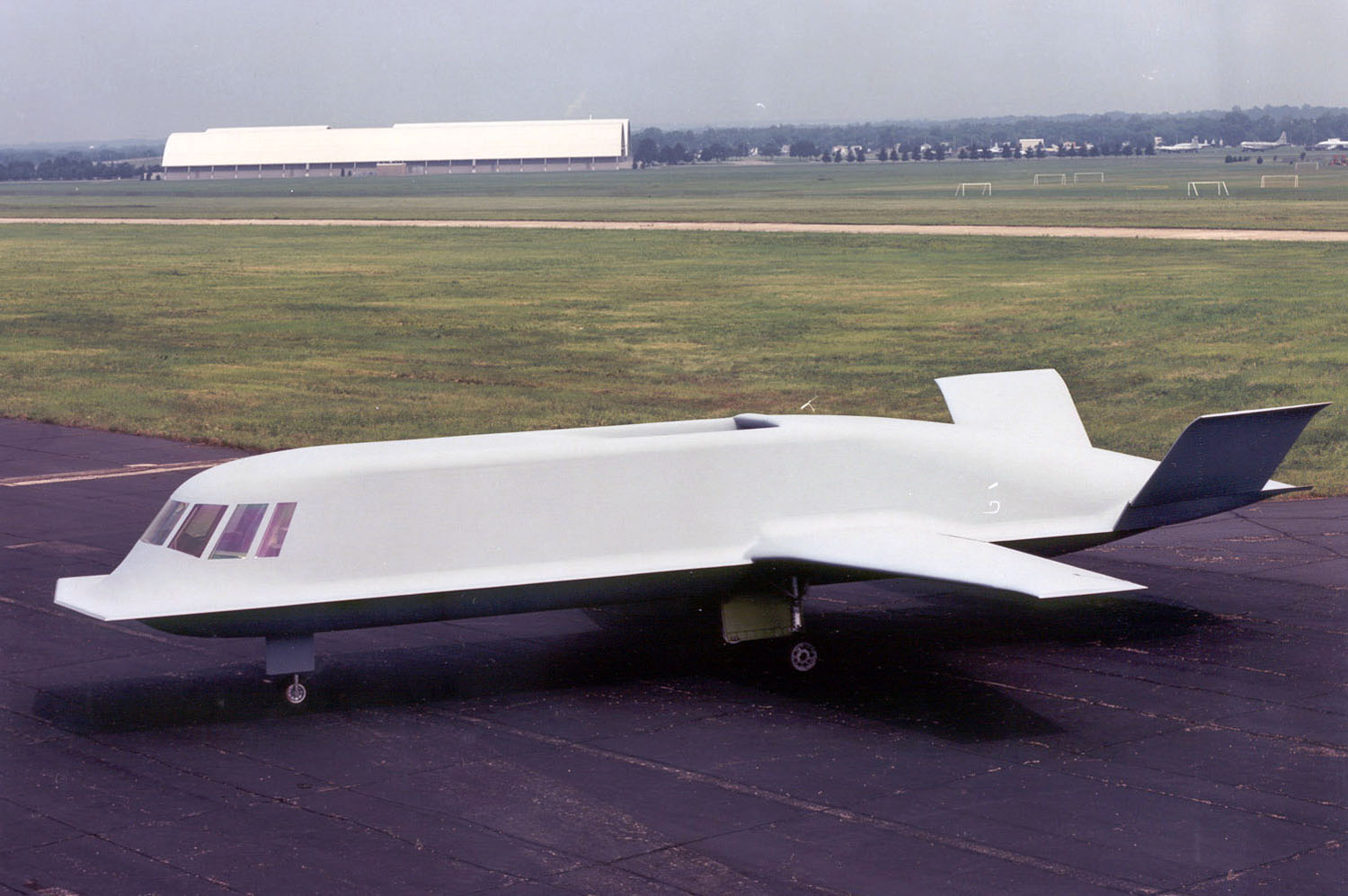
Northrop's B-2 chief engineer John Cashen was quoted in 1996 as having said, "You're talking about an aircraft that at the time was arguably the most unstable aircraft man had ever flown."

Tacit Blue, nicknamed "the whale" (and sometimes also called an "alien school bus" for its only slightly rounded-off rectangular shape), featured a straight tapered wing with a V-tail mounted on an oversized fuselage with a curved shape. It was the first stealth aircraft to feature curved surfaces for radar cross-section reduction. Northrop would use this stealth technology on the B-2 bomber. A single flush inlet on the top of the fuselage provided air to two medium-bypass turbofan engines. Tacit Blue employed a quadruply redundant digital fly-by-wire flight control system to help stabilize the aircraft about its longitudinal and directional axes.

== Operational history ==
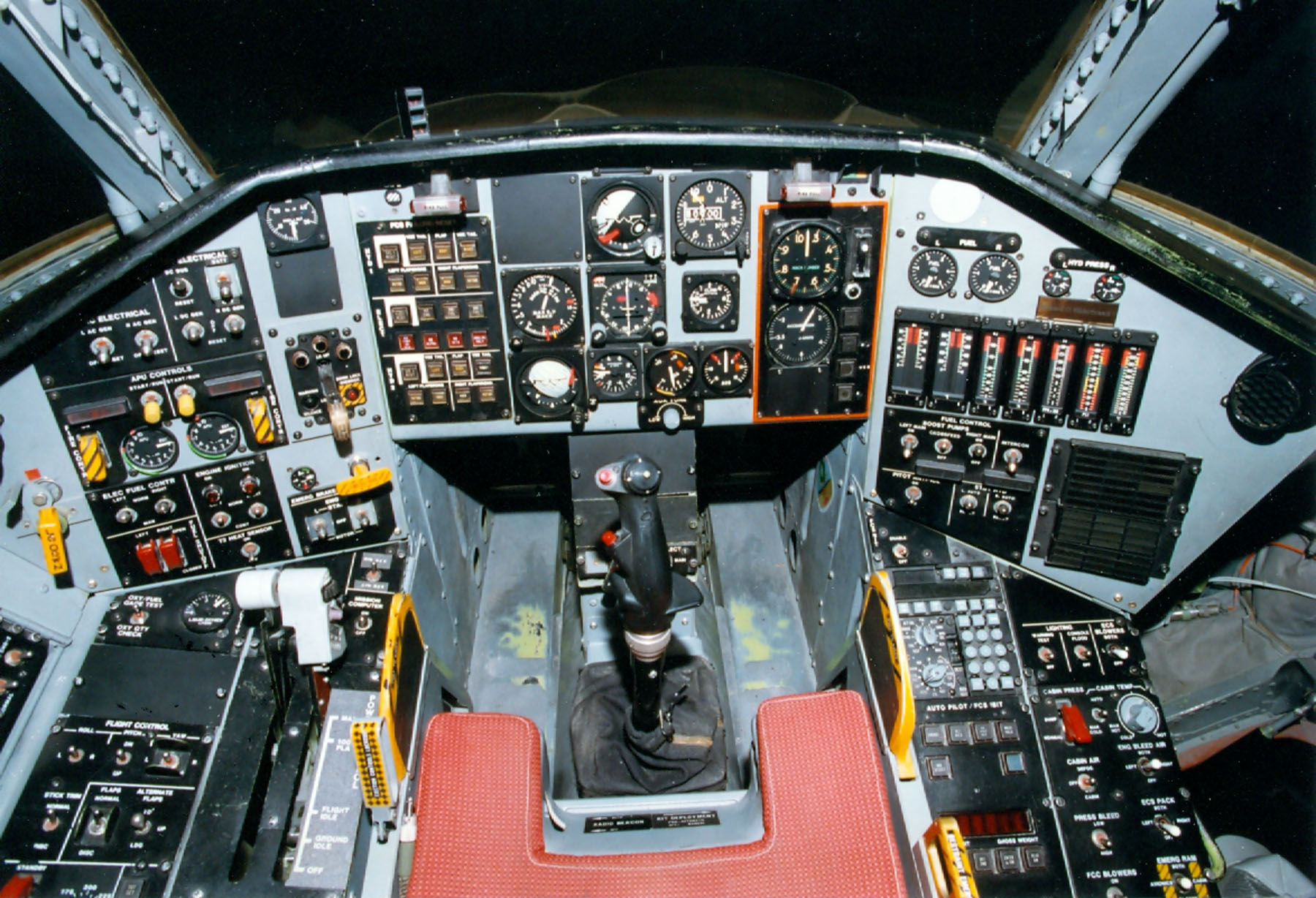
Northrop Tacit Blue cockpit

The aircraft made its first successful flight on February 5, 1982, in Area 51, at Groom Lake, Nevada, flown by Northrop test pilot Richard G. Thomas. The aircraft subsequently logged 135 flights over a three-year period. The aircraft often flew three to four flights weekly and several times flew more than once a day.

Another Tacit Blue test pilot, Ken Dyson, told CNN in 2014 that Northrop had manufactured additional major components for the jet, which amounted to half of a second plane. "If we lost one, we could have a second one up and flying in short order," Dyson said.

After reaching about 250 flight hours, the aircraft was placed in storage in 1985. In 1996, after Tacit Blue was declassified, it was placed on display at the National Museum of the United States Air Force at Wright-Patterson Air Force Base, near Dayton, Ohio and has been on display in the fourth hangar at the museum since June 2016.

== Specifications ==
Data from the National Museum of the United States Air Force and the Department of Defense

General characteristics

- Crew: 1
- Length: 55 ft 10 in (17.02 m)
- Wingspan: 48 ft 2 in (14.68 m)
- Height: 10 ft 7 in (3.23 m)
- Airfoil: Clark Y mod.
- Gross weight: 30,000 lb (13,608 kg)
- Powerplant: 2 × Garrett ATF3-6 turbofan engines, 5,440 lbf (24.2 kN) thrust each

Performance

- Maximum speed: 250 kn (290 mph, 460 km/h)
- Service ceiling: 25,000–30,000 ft (7,600–9,100 m) operating altitude
- Thrust/weight: 0.36

== See also ==
Aircraft of comparable role, configuration, and era

- Lockheed Have Blue

Related lists

- List of experimental aircraft
- List of military aircraft of the United States
- List of stealth aircraft
