= Farris (surname) =

Farris is a surname. Notable people with the name include:

- Amy Farris (1968–2009), American fiddler
- Barbara Farris (born 1976), American basketball player
- Charlye O. Farris (1929–2010), American lawyer
- Chase Farris (born 1993), American football player
- Christine King Farris (1927–2023), American educator and civil rights activist
- Darren Farris (born 1972), American singer-songwriter
- Dionne Farris (born 1968), American singer
- Eric Farris (born 1986), American baseball player
- Hazel Farris (c. 1880–1906), American alleged murderer
- Ion Farris (1878–1934), American politician
- Isaac Newton Farris, Jr., American civil rights leader
- Jack K. Farris (1934–2019), American general
- James Farris (baseball) (1992–2025), American baseball pitcher
- Jerome Farris (1930–2020), American judge
- Jimmy Farris (born 1978), American football player
- John Farris (born 1936), American writer
- John Lauchlan Farris (1911–1986), Canadian lawyer and judge
- John Wallace de Beque Farris (1878–1970), Canadian politician
- Joshua Farris (born 1995), American figure skater
- Katie Farris, American writer
- Kendrick Farris (born 1986), American weightlifter
- Kris Farris (born 1977), American football player
- Laughlin Farris (1843–1925), Canadian politician
- Leona Farris (1917–2022), American educator
- Lindsay Farris (born 1985), Australian actor
- Mark Farris (born 1975), American football and baseball player
- Michael Farris (lawyer) (born 1951), American lawyer
- Mike Farris (musician) (born ca. 1968), American musician
- Mitch Farris (born 2001), American baseball player
- Ralph Farris (born 1970), American violist
- Ralph W. Farris (1886–1968), American politician from Maine
- Ron Farris (fl. 1990s–2000s), American politician from Mississippi
- Suzanne Farris (murder victim) (died 1966), American murder victim
- Tom Farris (1920–2002), American football player
- Vera King Farris (1938–2009), American college administrator
- Victor Farris, American inventor

== See also ==
- Faris (name), given name and surname
- Three Australian musicians named Farriss, all brothers and former members of INXS:
  - Tim Farriss (born 1957)
  - Andrew Farriss (born 1959)
  - Jon Farriss (born 1961)
- Farrish
- Ferris (name), given name and surname
