= Farris (disambiguation) =

Farris is a lake in Norway.

Farris may also refer to:

== In the United States ==
- Farris, Minnesota, an unincorporated community
- Farris, Oklahoma, an unincorporated community
- Farris Center, an arena at the University of Central Arkansas
- Dub Farris Athletic Complex, a sporting complex in San Antonio, Texas

== Other uses ==
- Farris (surname), a list of people with the surname
- Farris (mineral water), a mineral water named after Lake Farris
