= Farrish =

Farrish is a surname. Notable people with the surname include:

- Dave Farrish (born 1956), Canadian ice hockey player
- Linn Farrish (1901–1944), American rugby union player and alleged spy
- William Farrish (1835–1920), American politician

== See also ==
- Farish (disambiguation)
- Farris (disambiguation)
