= Farish =

Farish may refer to:

== Places ==
- Forish, a village in Jizzakh Region, Uzbekistan, also romanised as Farish

== People ==
=== Given name ===
- Farish Jenkins (1940–2012), American paleontologist
- Farish A. Noor (born 1967), Malaysian political scientist and historian
- Farish Carter Tate (1856–1922), American politician

=== Surname ===
- Catherine Farish (born 1951), Canadian artist
- Donald J. Farish (1942–2018), American biologist
- Hazlewood Power Farish (1880–1958), American politician
- Helen Farish (born 1962), British poet
- James Farish (fl. 1838–41), British colonial administrator
- Oscar Eugene Farish (1868–1917), American businessman and politician
- Ryan Farish (21st century), American electronica artist
- Stephen Farish (born 1970), English bowls player
- William Farish (chemist) (1759–1837), British chemist
- William Stamps Farish II (1881–1942), American businessman
- William Stamps Farish III (born 1939), American businessman

== See also ==
- Graham Farish, British producer of model railway equipment
- Farris (surname)
- Farrish, a surname
