= Jack Farris =

Jack Farris may refer to:

- Jack B. Farris (1935–2019), United States Army general
- Jack K. Farris (born 1934), United States Air Force general
