= AN/ARC-190 =

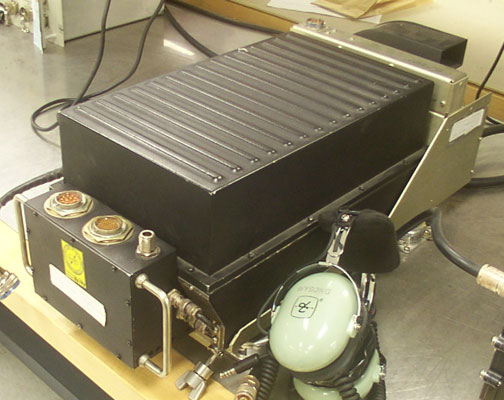
ARC-190 Receiver/Transmitter (RT-1341) in an R/T mount connected to a bench test set.

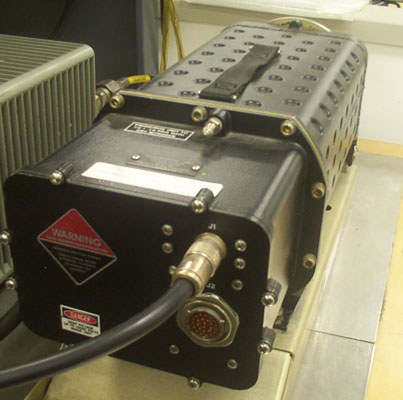
ARC-190 Antenna Coupler (CU-2275) connected to a dummy load for bench testing.

The AN/ARC-190 is an airborne HF communications system, found on C-130, C-20, KC-135, C-141, C-5, C-9, KC-10, B-1, B-52, C-17, E-3, E-4, E-8 JSTARS, F-15, F-16, H-53, H-60, S-2T, and Bell Boeing V-22 Osprey aircraft.

== System Description ==
The ARC-190 is a military HF radio that operates between 2-30 MHz and transmits at 300+ watts. It features a dual heterodyne receiver/transmitter that uses IF frequencies of 97.8 and 1.8 MHz, an antenna coupler that is pressurized to 7±1 PSI with dry nitrogen (air) which (1) prevents high voltage arcing, (2) prevents corrosion, (3) provides a uniform cooling medium, and one of various controls which provide access to 30 preset channels, 30,000 normal channels, 280,000 channels when using SSB, test functions, squelch, power on/off, and one of 8 modes of operation: UV (Upper Voice), LV (Lower Voice), UD (Upper Data), LD (Lower Data), CW (Continuous Wave), AME (Amplitude Modulated Equivalent), P (Preset) and A (not used).

In accordance with the Joint Electronics Type Designation System (JETDS), the "AN/ARC-190" designation represents the 190th design of an Army-Navy airborne electronic device for radio communications equipment. The JETDS system also now is used to name all Department of Defense electronic systems.

== History ==
In the late 1990s, ARC-190 systems on various airframes underwent a modification to the Auto Communications System which included a new control panel and the ACS processor. The system was designed for long distance communications using ACS capable ground stations which would traffic calls via HF radio and commercial phone lines.

As of 2022, the Department of Defense contracted BAE Systems to replace the AN/ARC-190 with about 2,500 radios.

== See also ==
- List of military electronics of the United States
