= Norden Systems =

- Formerly: Norden Laboratories Corporation; Norden Instruments; Norden-Ketay
- Founded: 1943
- Founder: Theodore H. Barth; Carl Norden
- Defunct: 2013
- Fate: Closed
- Headquarters: Norwalk, Connecticut, United States
- Parent: United Aircraft (1958-1975); United Technologies (1975-1994); Westinghouse Electric (1994-1996); Northrop Grumman (1996-2013)

Norden Systems was an American manufacturer of radar systems.

== History ==
The Norden Laboratories Corporation was founded in New York City in 1943 to conduct research, while the separate Carl L. Norden Corporation built Norden bombsights. In 1949, the company was purchased by Paul W. Adams. Then, in 1955 it was merged with the Ketay Instrument Corporation to form Norden-Ketay Corporation. The company was bought by United Aircraft in 1958. It remained a subsidiary through the transition to United Technologies – in the process absorbing Dynell Electronics Corporation and becoming Norden Systems – before being sold to Westinghouse Electric in 1994. However, following an employee backlash due to a planned move to Baltimore, it was sold for a final time to Northrop Grumman in 1996. Decreasing utilization of the division's headquarters would eventually force the closure of the division in 2013.

== Products ==
=== Other ===
- Marine Integrated Fire and Air Support System (MIFASS)

=== Radars ===
- AN/APG-74
- AN/APG-76
- AN/APQ-92
- AN/APQ-103
- AN/APQ-112
- AN/APQ-148
- AN/APQ-155
- AN/APQ-156
- AN/APY-3
- AN/ASB-1
- AN/BPS-15
- AN/SPQ-9
- AN/SPS-40B
- AN/SPS-67
