= Northrop Grumman E-8 Joint STARS =

Airborne ground surveillance aircraft based on Boeing 707 airliner

E-8 Joint STARS
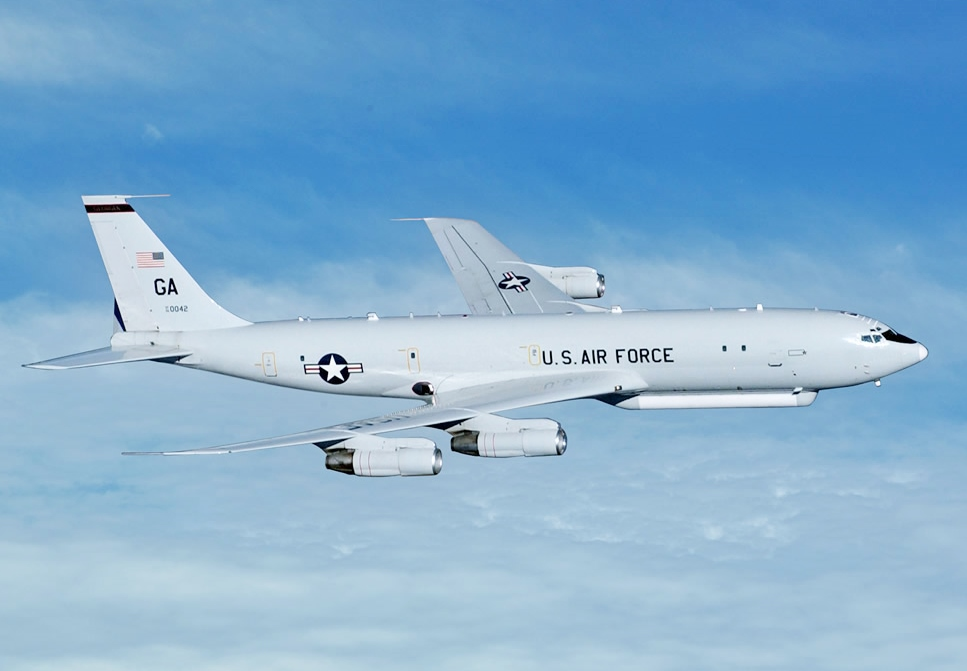
- A U.S. Air Force E-8C Joint STARS, in flight

General information
- Type: Airborne Battle Management and ISTAR
- Manufacturer: Grumman Aerospace Corporation; Northrop Grumman
- Status: Out of service, on display
- Primary user: United States Air Force
- Number built: 17

History
- Manufactured: 1988–2005
- Introduction date: 1991
- First flight: 1 April 1988
- Retired: 2023
- Developed from: Boeing 707

The Northrop Grumman E-8 Joint Surveillance Target Attack Radar System (Joint STARS) is a retired United States Air Force (USAF) airborne ground surveillance, battle management and command and control aircraft. It tracked ground vehicles and some aircraft, collected imagery, and relayed tactical pictures to ground and air theater commanders. Until its retirement in 2023 the aircraft was operated by both active duty USAF and Air National Guard units, with specially trained U.S. Army personnel as additional flight crew.

== Development ==
Joint STARS evolved from separate U.S. Army and Air Force (USAF) programs to develop technology to detect, locate and attack enemy armor at ranges beyond the front line of a battle. In 1982, the programs were merged and the USAF became the lead agent. The concept and sensor technology for the E-8 was developed and tested on the Tacit Blue experimental aircraft. The prime contract was awarded to Grumman Aerospace Corporation in September 1985 for two E-8A development systems.

In late 2005, Northrop Grumman was awarded a contract for upgrading engines and other systems. Pratt & Whitney, in a joint venture with Seven Q Seven (SQS), was contracted to produce and deliver JT8D-219 engines for the E-8s. Their greater efficiency would have allowed the Joint STARS to spend more time on station, take off from a wider range of runways, climb faster, fly higher, all with a much reduced cost per flying hour.

In December 2008, an E-8C test aircraft took its first flight with the new engines. In 2009, the company began engine replacement and additional upgrade efforts. The re-engining funding was halted in 2009 as the Air Force began to consider other options for performing the JSTARS mission.

== Design ==
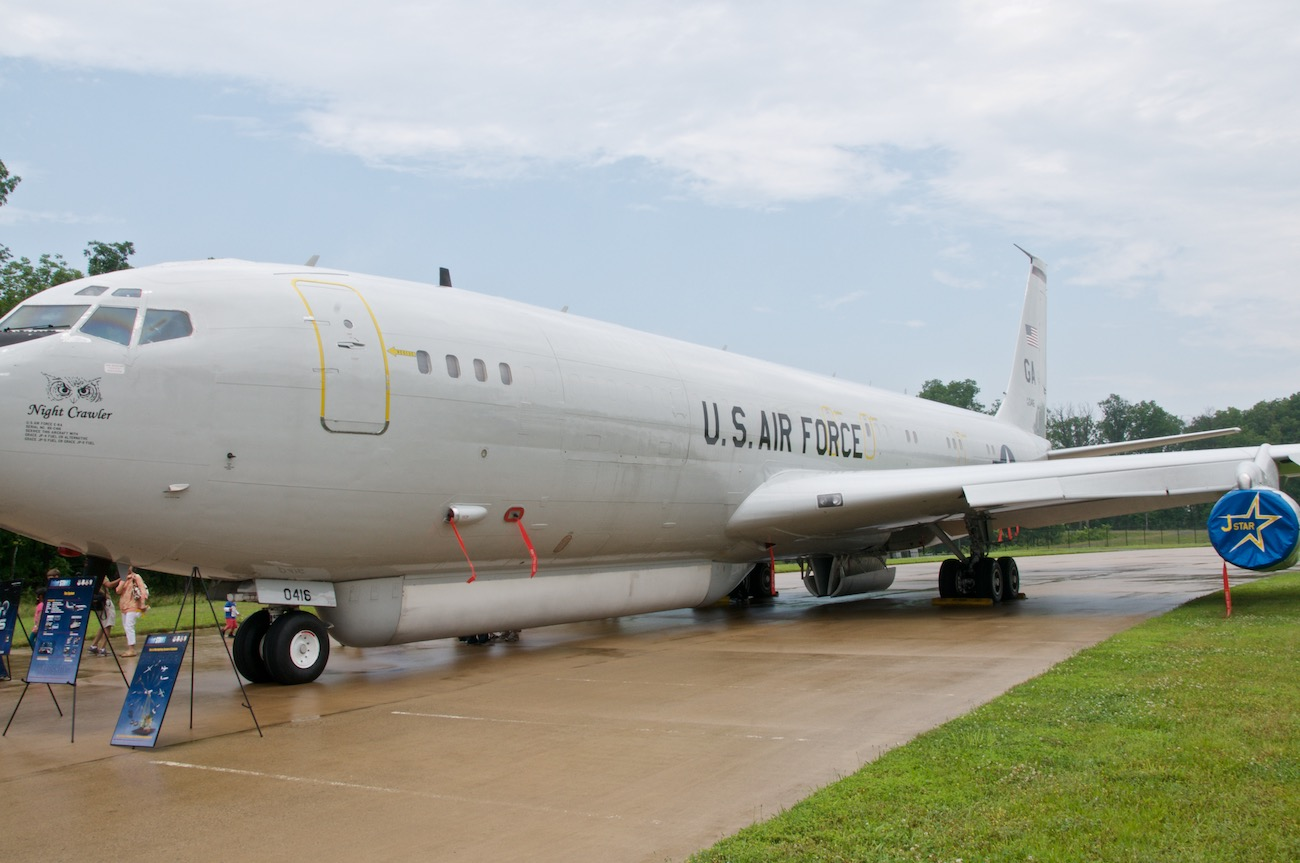
Northrop Grumman E-8A Joint Surveillance Target Attack Radar System. The radome for the side-looking radar is visible under the forward fuselage.

The E-8C is an aircraft modified from the Boeing 707-300 series commercial airliner. The E-8 carries specialized radar, communications, operations and control subsystems. The most prominent external feature is the 40 ft (12 m) canoe-shaped radome under the forward fuselage that houses the 24 ft (7.3 m) APY-7 active electronically scanned array side looking airborne radar antenna.

The E-8C can respond quickly and effectively to support worldwide military contingency operations. It is a jam-resistant system capable of operating while experiencing heavy electronic countermeasures. The E-8C can fly a mission profile for 9 hours without refueling. Its range and on-station time can be substantially increased through in-flight refueling.

=== Radar and systems ===
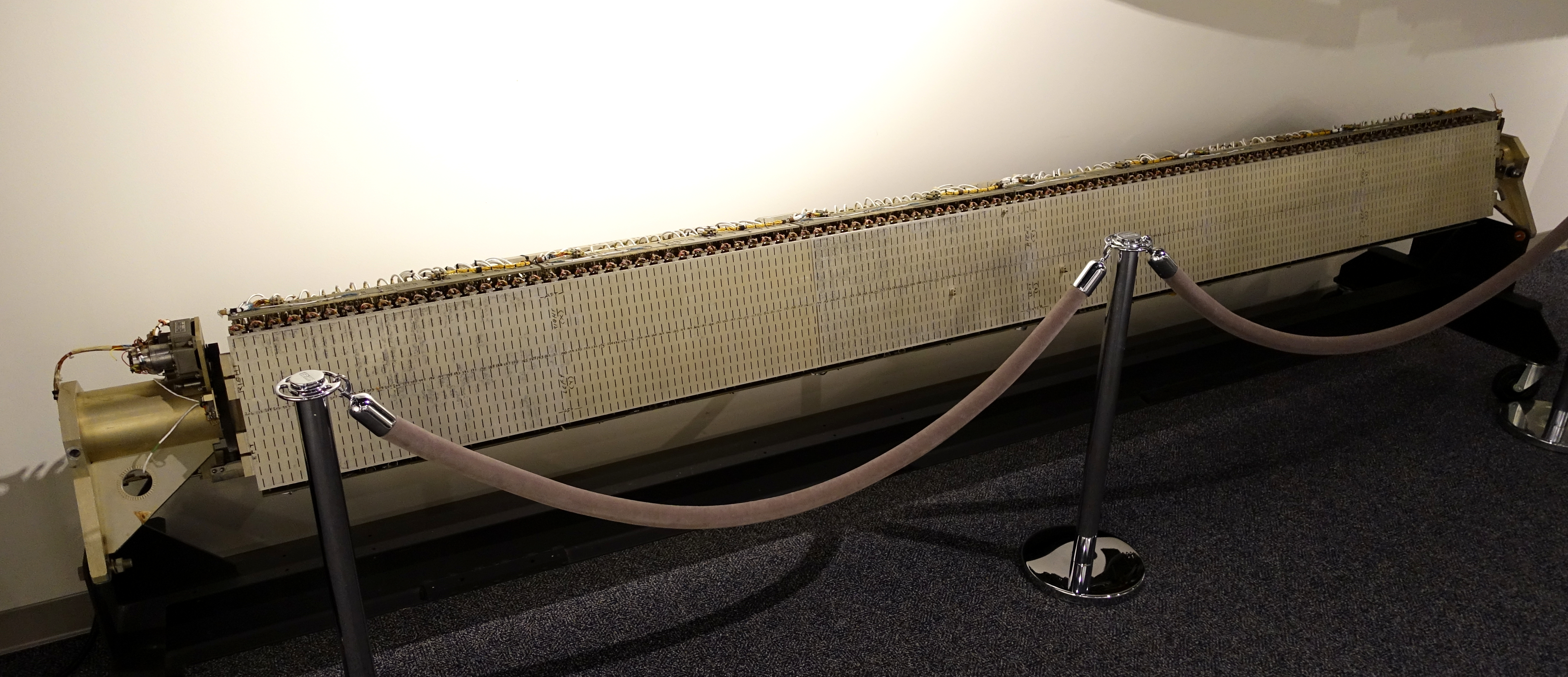
Pave Mover Radar, the prototype for the JSTARS radar

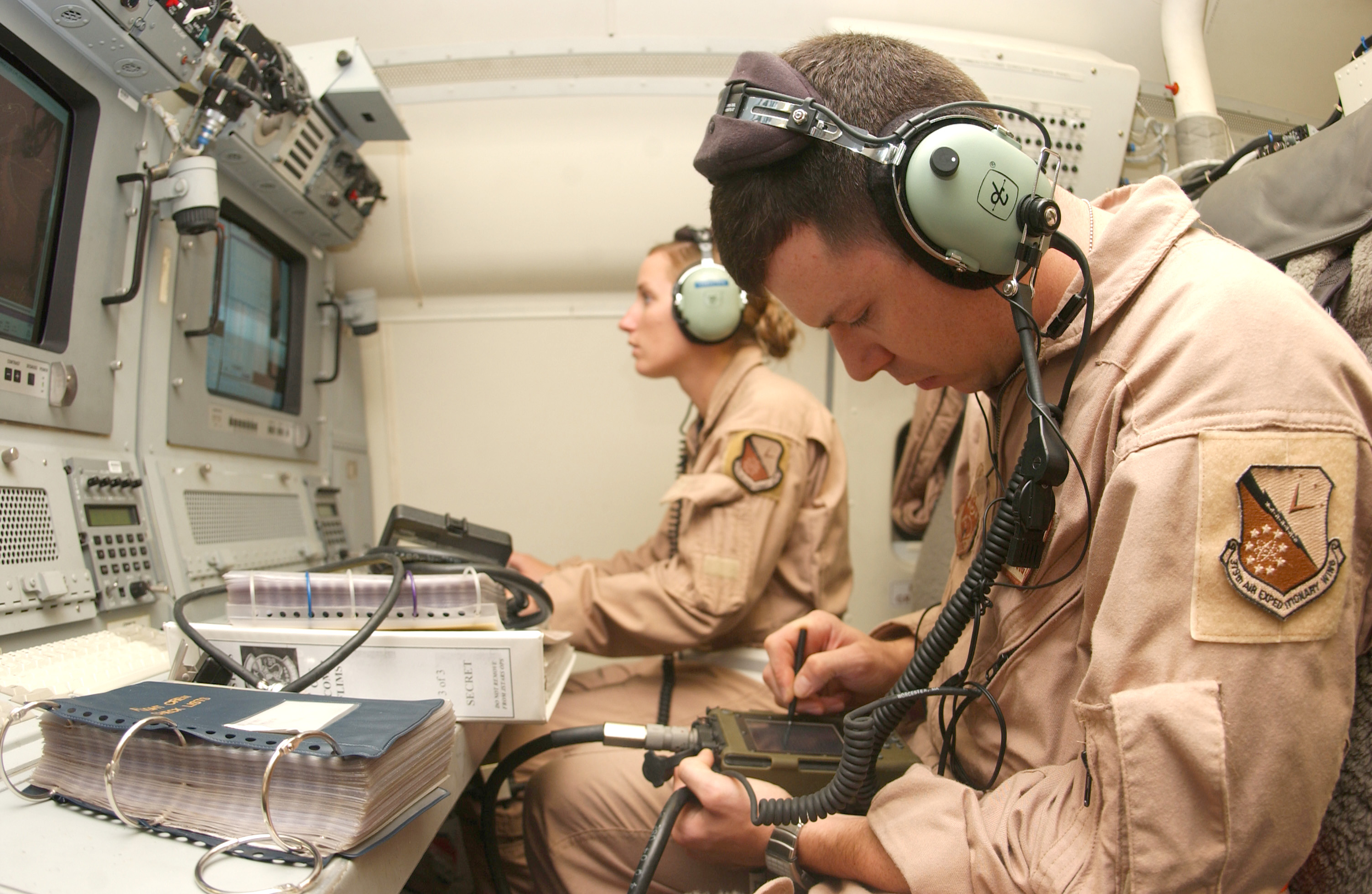
Crew members uploading software onto an E-8 during preparations for a flight

The AN/APY-7 radar can operate in wide area surveillance, ground moving target indicator (GMTI), fixed target indicator (FTI) target classification, and synthetic aperture radar (SAR) modes.

To pick up moving targets, the Doppler radar looks at the Doppler frequency shift of the returned signal. It can look from a long-range, which the military refers to as a high standoff capability. The antenna can be tilted to either side of the aircraft for a 120-degree field of view covering nearly 19,305 square miles (50,000 km^{2}) and can simultaneously track 600 targets at more than 152 miles (250 km). The GMTI modes cannot pick up objects that are too small, insufficiently dense, or stationary. Data processing allows the APY-7 to differentiate between armored vehicles (tracked tanks) and trucks, allowing targeting personnel to better select the appropriate ordnance for various targets.

The system's SAR modes can produce images of stationary objects. Objects with many angles (for example, the interior of a pick-up bed) will give a much better radar signature, or specular return. In addition to being able to detect, locate and track large numbers of ground vehicles, the radar has a limited capability to detect helicopters, rotating antennas and low, slow-moving fixed-wing aircraft.

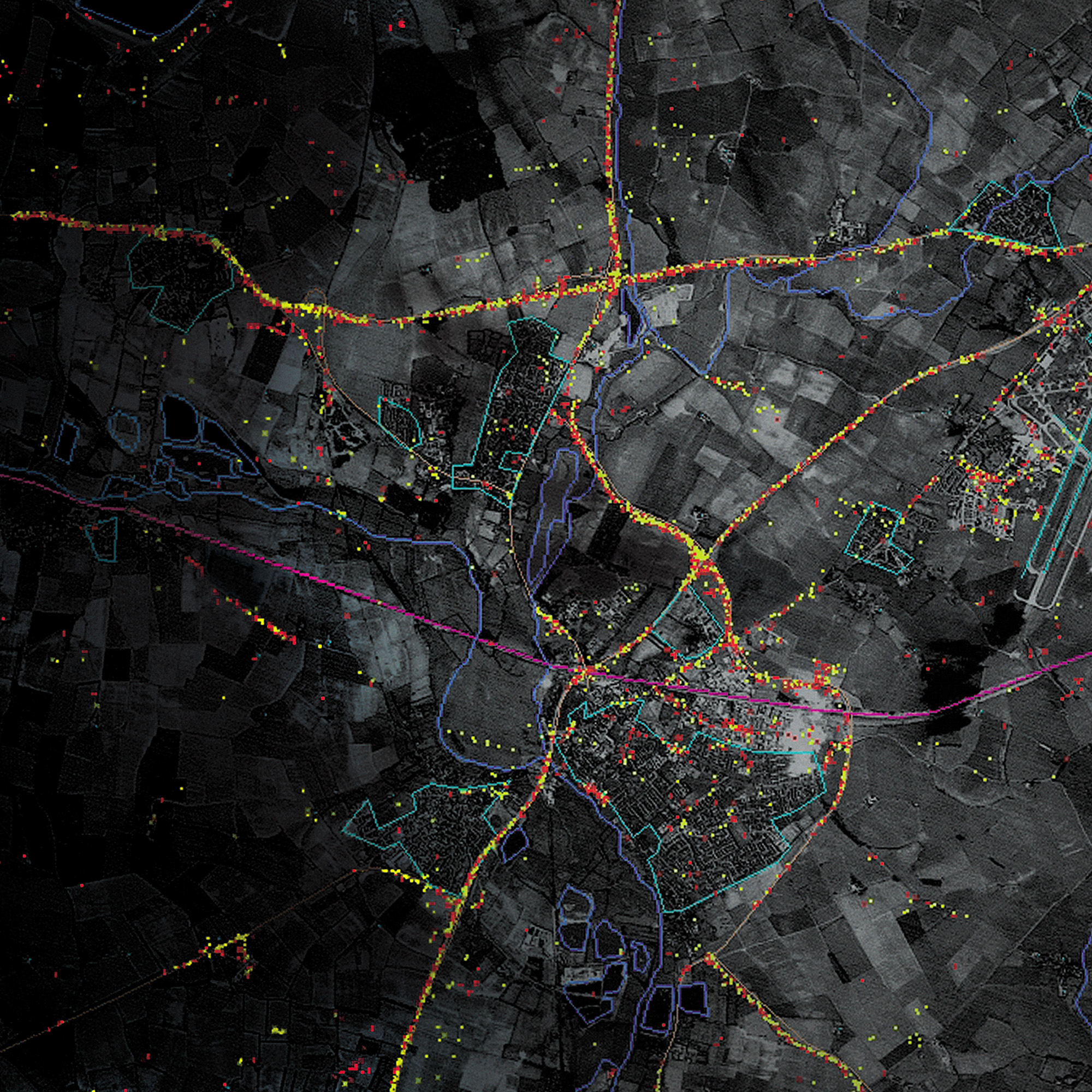
Joint STARS GMTI overlaid on aerial image

The radar and computer subsystems on the E-8C can gather and display broad and detailed battlefield information. Data is collected as events occur. This includes position and tracking information on enemy and friendly ground forces. The information is relayed in near-real time to the US Army's common ground stations via the secure jam-resistant surveillance and control data link (SCDL) and to other ground C4I nodes beyond line-of-sight via ultra high-frequency satellite communications.

Other major E-8C prime mission equipment are the communications/datalink (COMM/DLX) and operations and control (O&C) subsystems. Eighteen operator workstations display computer-processed data in graphic and tabular format on video screens. Operators and technicians perform battle management, surveillance, weapons, intelligence, communications and maintenance functions.

Northrop Grumman has tested the installation of a MS-177 camera on an E-8C to provide real time visual target confirmation.

The Multi-Platform Radar Technology Insertion Program (MP-RTIP) radar system was proposed as a more capable replacement of the AN/APY-7. The USAF ended up pursuing cheaper ways to modernize the E-8, though the MP-RTIP receiver technology did see use in the form of JSTARS Radar Modernization (JSRM).

=== Battle management ===
In missions from peacekeeping operations to major theater war, the E-8C can provide targeting data and intelligence for attack aviation, naval surface fire, field artillery and friendly maneuver forces. The information helps air and land commanders to control the battlespace.

The E-8's ground-moving radar can tell approximate number of vehicles, location, speed, and direction of travel. It cannot identify exactly what type of vehicle a target is, tell what equipment it has, or discern whether it is friendly, hostile, or a bystander, so commanders often crosscheck the JSTARS data against other sources. In the Army, JSTARS data is analyzed in and disseminated from a Ground Station Module (GSM).

Other improvement programs that have been applied to the E-8C include JSTARS Net Enabled Weapons (JNEW) and Joint Surface Warfare (JSuW); Blue Force Tracker (BFT); and Battlefield Airborne Communications Node (BACN) compatibility.

== Operational history ==
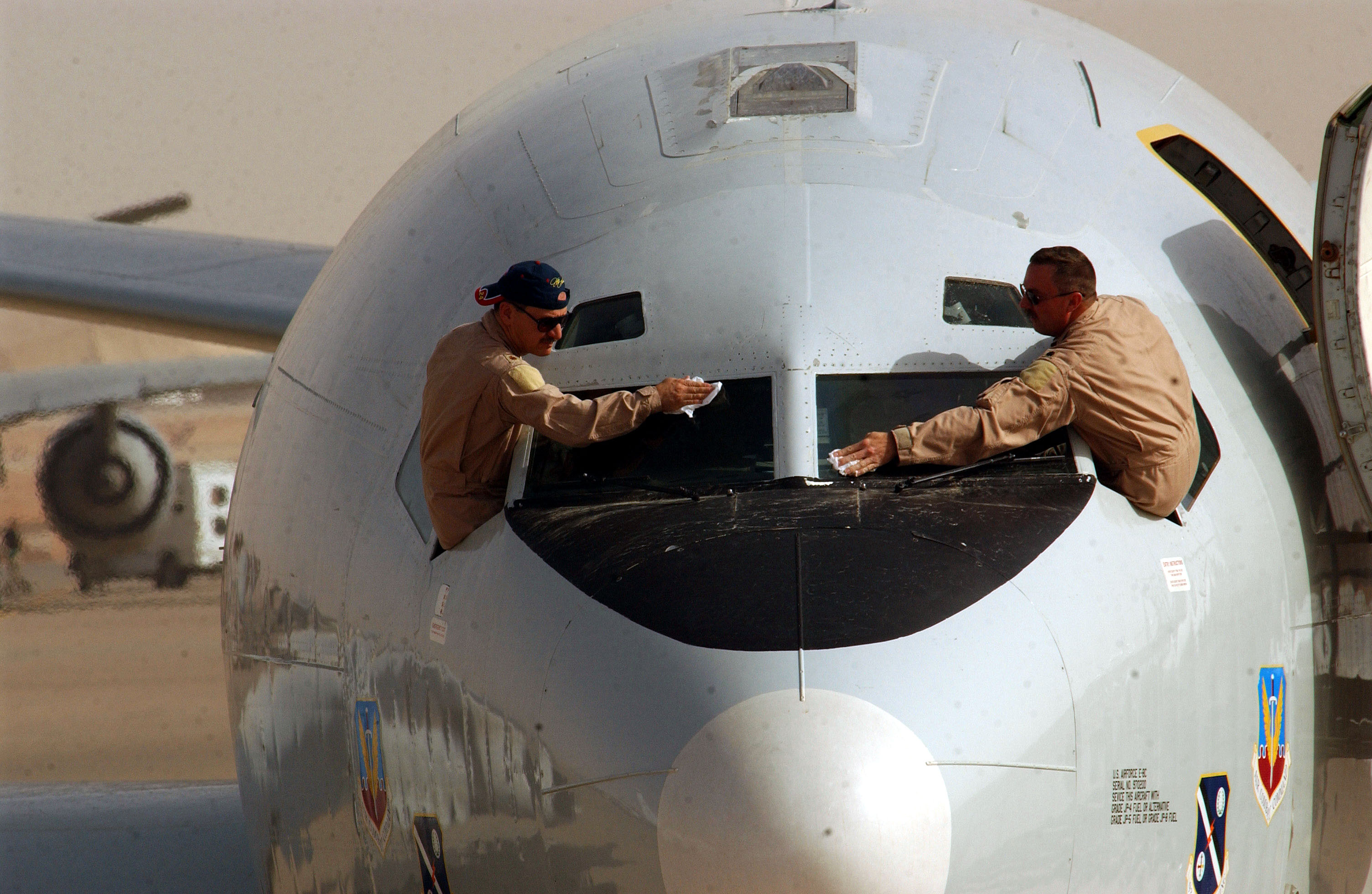
Pilots from Robins Air Force Base cleaning the windshields of their E-8 before a mission in Iraq

The two E-8A development aircraft were deployed in 1991 to participate in Operation Desert Storm under the direction of USAF Colonel Harry H. Heimple, Program Director, even though they were still in development. The joint program accurately tracked mobile Iraqi forces, including tanks and Scud missiles. Crews flew developmental aircraft on 49 combat sorties, accumulating more than 500 combat hours and a 100% mission effectiveness rate.

These Joint STARS developmental aircraft also participated in Operation Joint Endeavor, a NATO peacekeeping mission, in December 1995. While flying in friendly air space, the test-bed E-8A and pre-production E-8C aircraft monitored ground movements to confirm compliance with the Dayton Peace Accords agreements. Crews flew 95 consecutive operational sorties and more than 1,000 flight hours with a 98% mission effectiveness rate.

The 93d Air Control Wing, which activated 29 January 1996, accepted its first aircraft on 11 June 1996, and deployed in support of Operation Joint Endeavor in October. The provisional 93d Air Expeditionary Group monitored treaty compliance while NATO rotated troops through Bosnia and Herzegovina. The first production E-8C and a pre-production E-8C flew 36 operational sorties and more than 470 flight hours with a 100% effectiveness rate. The wing declared initial operational capability 18 December 1997 after receiving the second production aircraft. Operation Allied Force saw Joint STARS in action again from February to June 1999 accumulating more than 1,000 flight hours and a 94.5% mission-effectiveness rate in support of the U.S.-led Kosovo War.

The twelfth production aircraft, outfitted with an upgraded operations and control subsystem, was delivered to the USAF on 5 November 2001.

On 1 October 2002, the 93d Air Control Wing (93 ACW) was "blended" with the 116th Bomb Wing in a ceremony at Robins Air Force Base (AFB), Georgia. The 116 BW was an Air National Guard wing equipped with B-1B Lancer bombers at Robins. As a result of a USAF reorganization of the B-1B force, all B-1Bs were assigned to active duty wings, resulting in the 116 BW lacking a current mission. The newly created wing was designated 116th Air Control Wing (116 ACW) and the 93 ACW was inactivated the same day. The 116 ACW constituted the first fully blended wing of active duty and Air National Guard airmen. The wing took delivery of the 17th and final E-8C on 23 March 2005.

The E-8C Joint STARS routinely supported various taskings of the Combined Force Command Korea during the North Korean winter exercise cycle and for the United Nations enforcing resolutions on Iraq.

In March 2009, a Joint STARS aircraft was damaged beyond economical repair when a test plug was left on a fuel tank vent, subsequently causing the fuel tank to rupture during in-flight refueling. There were no casualties but the aircraft sustained $25 million in damage.

In September 2009, Loren B. Thompson of the Lexington Institute raised the question of why most of the Joint STARS fleet was sitting idle instead of being used to track insurgents in Afghanistan. Thompson states that the Joint STARS' radar has an inherent capacity to find what the Army calls 'dismounted' targets—insurgents walking around or placing roadside bombs. Thompson's neutrality has been questioned by some since Lexington Institute has been heavily funded by defense contractors, including Northrop Grumman. Trials of Joint STARS in Afghanistan were destined to develop tactics, techniques and procedures in tracking dismounted, moving groups of Taliban.

In January 2011, Northrop Grumman's E-8C Joint Surveillance Target Attack Radar System (Joint STARS) test bed aircraft completed the second of two deployments to Naval Air Station Point Mugu, California, in support of the U.S. Navy Joint Surface Warfare Joint Capability Technology Demonstration to test its network-enabled weapon architecture. The Joint STARS aircraft executed three Operational Utility Assessment flights and demonstrated its ability to guide anti-ship weapons against surface combatants at a variety of standoff distances in the NEW architecture.

From 2001 to January 2011 the Joint STARS fleet flew more than 63,000 hours in 5,200 combat missions in support of Operations Iraqi Freedom, Enduring Freedom and New Dawn.

On 1 October 2011, the "blended" wing construct of the 116th Air Control Wing (116 ACW), combining Air National Guard and Regular Air Force personnel in a single unit was discontinued. On this date, the 461st Air Control Wing (461 ACW) was established at Robins AFB as the Air Force's sole active duty E-8 Joint STARS wing while the 116 ACW reverted to a traditional Air National Guard wing within the Georgia Air National Guard. Both units share the same E-8 aircraft and will often fly with mixed crews, but now function as separate units.

On 1 October 2019, JSTARS ended its continuous presence in the United States Central Command (USCENTCOM) areas of responsibility. The 18–year deployment was the second-longest deployment in U.S. Air Force history. In that time, the crews and aircraft flew 10,938 sorties, and 114,426.6 combat hours.

On 11 February 2022, the first of four JSTARS out of the remaining 16 operational JSTARS was retired as detailed in the Fiscal Year 2022 National Defence Authorisation Act (NDAA). The plane (serial number 92-3289/GA) which was the first to arrive at Robins AFB in 1996 has now been transferred to the 309th Aerospace Maintenance and Regeneration Group at Davis–Monthan Air Force Base.

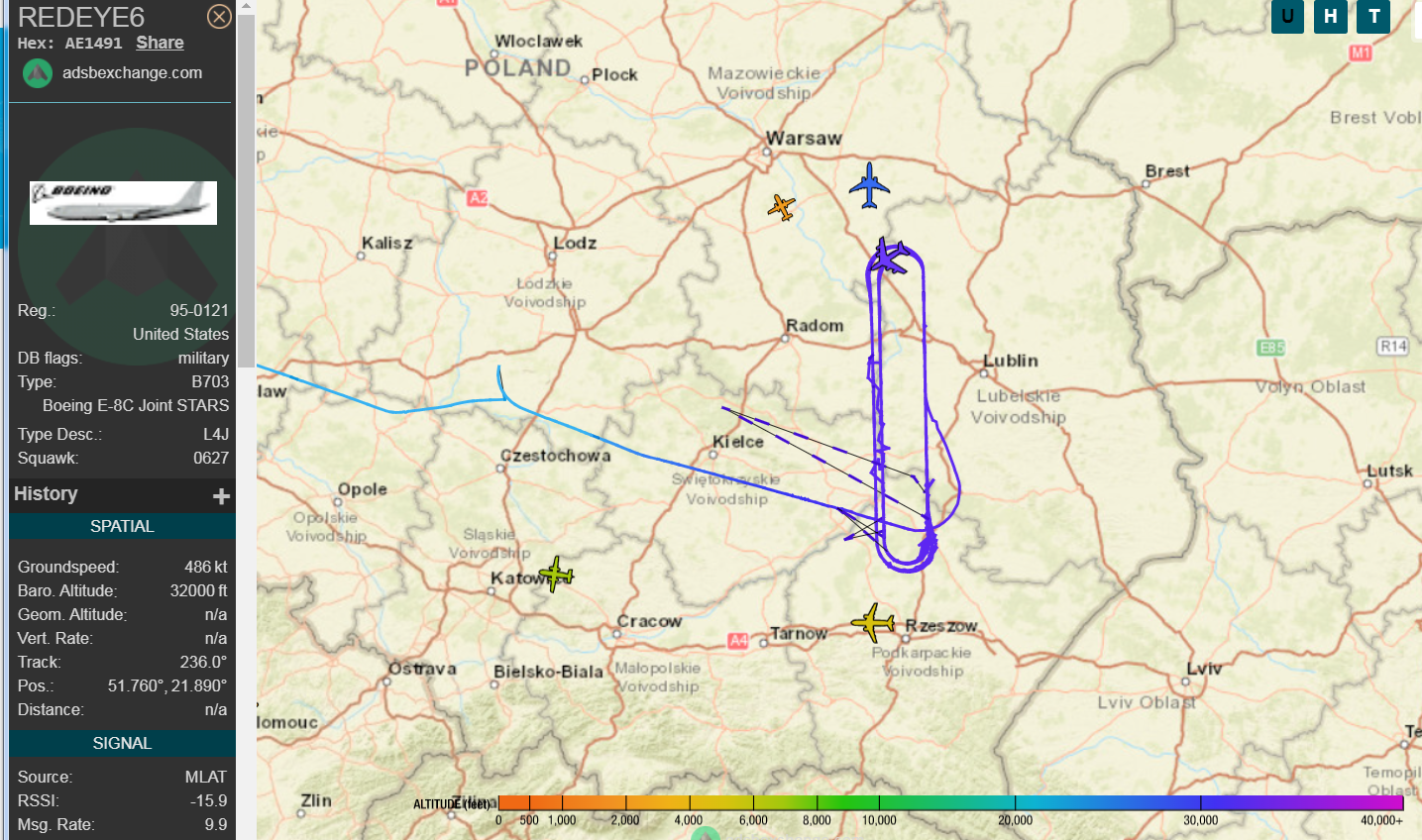
A USAF E-8C near the Ukrainian border on 23 March 2022 circa 14:37 UTC, likely monitoring Russian vehicle movements during the Russo-Ukrainian War

From late 2021 to early 2022, E-8C JSTARS aircraft deployed to Europe during the prelude to the Russian invasion of Ukraine. Thirty years after entering service, it was performing the type of mission it had originally been intended to: monitoring Russian military activity in Eastern Europe, which it did while operating over Ukrainian airspace until the start of the invasion in late February 2022.

=== Retirement ===
The USAF began an analysis of alternatives (AOA) in March 2010 for its next generation GMTI radar aircraft fleet. The study was completed in March 2012 and recommended buying a new business jet-based ISR aircraft, such as a version of the Boeing 737, and the Gulfstream 550. The Air Force said Joint STARS was expected to remain in operation through 2030.

On 23 January 2014, the USAF revealed a plan for the replacement of the Boeing 707-based E-8C with a business-jet class aircraft that would be "significantly smaller and more efficient." The program was called Joint STARS Recap and planned for the aircraft to reach initial operating capability (IOC) by 2022, with separate contracts to be awarded for developing the aircraft, airborne sensor, battle management command and control (BMC2) system, and communications subsystem.

On 8 April 2014, the Air Force held an industry day for companies interested in competing for Joint STARS Recap; attendees included Boeing, Bombardier Aerospace, and Gulfstream Aerospace. Initial specifications were for an aircraft with a 10-13 person crew with a 3.96–6.1 m (13.0–20.0 ft) radar array and capable of flying at 38,000 ft for eight hours. In August 2015, the Air Force issued contracts to Boeing, Lockheed Martin, and Northrop Grumman for a one-year pre-engineering and manufacturing development effort to mature and test competing designs ahead of a downselect in late 2017.

During the fiscal 2019 budget rollout briefing it was announced that the Air Force would not move forward with an E-8C replacement aircraft. Rather than procure an aircraft, the USAF intended to use a network of satellites, aircraft sensors and ground radars as a cheaper and more resilient approach to collecting similar targeting and tracking data.

The E-8C JSTARS began to be retired in February 2022, and flew its last operational sortie on 21 September 2023. The JSTARS performed its last flight on 15 November 2023. The aircraft conducted some 14,000 operational sorties, flying more than 141,000 hours over 32 years of service.

== Variants ==
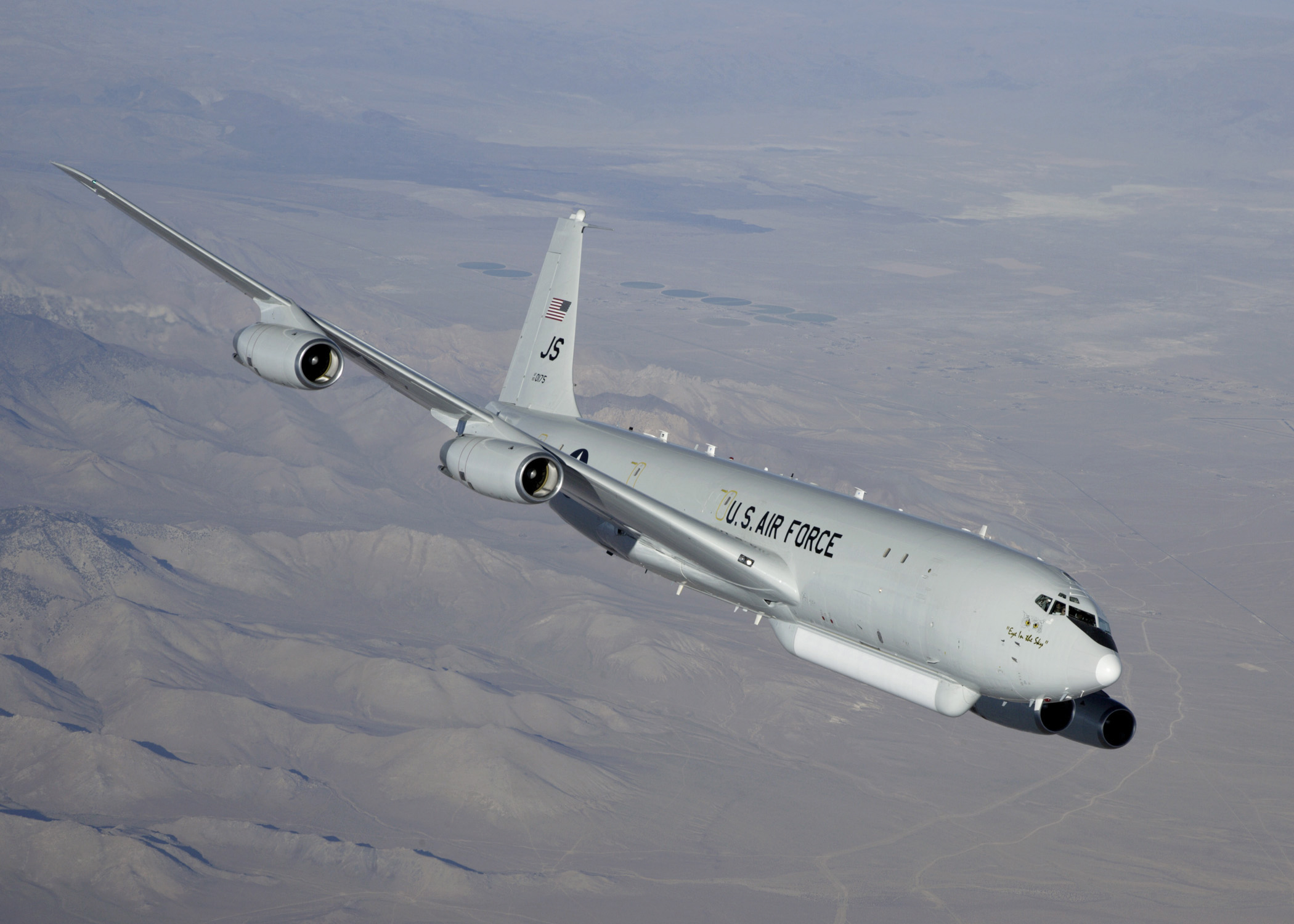
E-8C performing flight testing with JT8D-219 engines at Edwards AFB

E-8A
Original platform configuration
TE-8A
Single aircraft with mission equipment removed, used for flight crew training.
YE-8B
Single aircraft, was to be a U.S. Navy Boeing E-6 Mercury but transferred to the U.S. Air Force as a development aircraft before it was decided to convert second-hand Boeing 707s (one from a Canadian Boeing CC-137) for the JSTARS role.
E-8C
Production Joint STARS platform configuration, converted from second-hand Boeing 707s (1 from a CC-137).

== Operators ==
United States

- United States Air Force 1991–2023
- 93d Air Control Wing - Robins Air Force Base, Georgia 1996–2002
  - 12th Airborne Command and Control Squadron
  - 16th Airborne Command and Control Squadron
- 461st Air Control Wing - Robins Air Force Base, Georgia 2002–2023
  - 12th Airborne Command and Control Squadron
  - 16th Airborne Command and Control Squadron
- Air National Guard - 2006–2023
- 116th Air Control Wing - Robins Air Force Base, Georgia
  - 128th Airborne Command and Control Squadron

== Aircraft on display ==
- E-8C 00-2000 is preserved at the Museum of Aviation at Robins Air Force Base, Georgia. It was transported from the base to the museum's facilities in July 2023.
- TE-8A 86-0416 was transferred to the Sowela Technical Community College in Lake Charles, Louisiana on 19 September 2023. It will be used as a ground aircraft maintenance training tool as part of the college's Aviation Maintenance Technology program. This aircraft was one of the original two pre-production E-8A which took part in Operation Desert Storm in 1991, and also saw action during Operation Joint Endeavor in 1995. Afterward, it was converted into a TE-8A training aircraft and used to qualify E-8C pilots, navigators, and flight engineers.
- E-8C 02-9111, the last JSTARS aircraft in service, was transferred to Kelly Field, San Antonio, Texas, on 15 November 2023, where it serves as a ground training aircraft in the 37th Training Wing.

== Accidents ==
One E-8C was damaged beyond economical repair during an operational sortie.

- On 13 March 2009, E-8C tail 93-0597, while assigned to the USAF 379th Air Expeditionary Wing, experienced a near catastrophic fuel tank over-pressurization during aerial refueling. While refueling from a Boeing KC-135T Stratotanker a test plug left in the fuel vent system caused overpressure resulting in severe internal damage to the number two fuel tank and surrounding wing structure. The JSTARS crew were able to make a successful emergency landing at Al Udeid Air Base, and the aircraft was written off.

== Specifications ==
Data from USAF Factsheet

General characteristics

- Crew: 4 flight crew (pilot, co-pilot, navigator, flight engineer)
- Capacity: 18 specialists (crew size varies according to mission)
- Length: 152 ft 11 in (46.61 m)
- Wingspan: 145 ft 9 in (44.42 m)
- Height: 42 ft 6 in (12.95 m)
- Empty weight: 171,000 lb (77,564 kg)
- Max takeoff weight: 336,000 lb (152,407 kg)
- Powerplant: 4 × Pratt & Whitney TF33-PW-102 low-bypass turbofan engines, 19,200 lbf (85 kN) thrust each

Performance

- Cruise speed: 390 kn (450 mph, 720 km/h) to 510 kn (587 mph; 945 km/h)
- Optimum orbit speed: 449 mph (390 kn; 723 km/h) to 587 mph (510 kn; 945 km/h)
- Endurance: 9 hours
- Service ceiling: 42,000 ft (13,000 m)

Avionics

- AN/APY-7 synthetic aperture radar
- 12 AN/ARC-225 UHF radios w/ HAVE QUICK
- 2 AN/ARC-190 HF radios
- 4 VHF radios (2 x AN/ARC-210, 1 x AN/ARC-186, 1 x AN/ARC-201D)
- 3 AN/ARC-231 SATCOM radios

== See also ==
- Airborne early warning and control – Airborne system of surveillance radar plus command and control functions

Related development

- Boeing C-137 Stratoliner – VIP transport aircraft derived from the Boeing 707
- Boeing CC-137 – Boeing 707 transport of the Canadian Forces – parts from most of the ex-Canadian Forces 707 obtained for spares for the E-8 STARS program and two ex-CF converted as E-8 and E-8C
- Boeing E-3 Sentry – Airborne early warning and control aircraft based on Boeing 707 airframe
- Boeing E-6 Mercury – Airborne command post aircraft by Boeing based on 707 airframe

Aircraft of comparable role, configuration, and era

- Northrop Grumman E-2 Hawkeye – Airborne early warning and control aircraft
- Embraer R-99B – Airborne early warning and reconnaissance aircraft based on the ERJ-145
- Raytheon Sentinel – British military surveillance aircraft (2008–2014)

Related lists

- List of active military aircraft of the United States
- List of military electronics of the United States
