= Hazel Farris =

American mummified woman

- Poster to promote "Hazel the Mummy"
- Born: c. 1880; Kentucky
- Died: December 20, 1906 (aged 26); Bessemer, Alabama, U.S.
- Other name: Hazel the Mummy

Hazel Farris (c. 1880 – December 20, 1906) was an American woman whose purported mummified remains traveled the American South and were displayed for decades at the Bessemer Hall of History in Bessemer, Alabama as Hazel the Mummy. After appearing in a television documentary, her remains were cremated by her Nashville owners.

== Background ==
Farris was born in Kentucky in 1880 and was orphaned as a child. She eventually married and lived near Louisville with her husband. Accounts about the marriage vary; some accounts claim neighbors said the couple were both hard drinkers who fought violently, while other accounts claim the couple mostly lived a quiet life and only fought about Farris’ spendthrift ways when her husband drank.

According to folklore, on August 6, 1905, the couple had an argument over Farris’ desire to purchase a new hat. The argument led to blows and Farris ended up fatally shooting her husband who died on the floor of the living room. Hearing gun shots, neighbors summoned the police. Upon arriving, Farris fatally shot the three responding officers as well. When a passing deputy sheriff heard the commotion, he decided to investigate. After gaining entry into the Farris home, the deputy tried to restrain Farris. During the scuffle, the deputy tripped on Farris’ husband's body, accidentally discharging his weapon and shooting off the ring finger on Farris’ right hand in the process. Farris eventually broke free and fatally shot the deputy.

With a $500 reward for her capture, Farris fled from Kentucky and eventually settled in Bessemer, Alabama to begin a new life. It was there that she reportedly began working as a prostitute to support herself and drank heavily. In another version of the story, Farris posed as a schoolmarm and, overcome with guilt over murdering five men, drank in excess in private. She then began a relationship with an unnamed man who, in some accounts, was a police officer. After they became engaged, Farris either decided to come clean about her past to her fiancé or began imbibing and drunkenly revealed to her fiancé that she was wanted for murder. The man immediately turned Farris in to the police because of his devotion to the law or, most likely, for the reward money.

Before she could be captured, Farris took to her room where she began (or continued) drinking heavily. She then committed suicide by drinking whiskey and arsenic or possibly strychnine.

== Death and embalming ==
Following Farris' death on December 20, 1906, her body was taken to Adams-Vermillion Furniture in Bessemer, Alabama, a furniture store that also sold caskets and operated as a funeral home. Because no one claimed the body, it remained there. According to the traditional account, funeral home staff noticed that the body showed little sign of decomposition, a condition widely attributed at the time to the poison said to have caused her death.

News of the unusually well-preserved body attracted a steady stream of curious visitors. As interest grew, the proprietor reportedly began charging visitors 10 cents to view the body. He later loaned the remains to other exhibitors, including his brother in Tuscaloosa, Alabama.

Nearly a century later, researchers re-examined Farris' remains. They found no evidence that she had died from swallowing arsenic. Instead, they concluded that her body had most likely been preserved shortly after death using an arsenic-containing embalming fluid.

== Exhibition after death ==
In 1907, Farris' remains were acquired by traveling showman O. C. Brooks, who exhibited them under the name "Hazel the Mummy" in his traveling show for approximately 40 years. When Brooks died, he reportedly bequeathed the remains to his nephew on the condition that proceeds from their exhibition be donated to charity.

After Brooks' death, his nephew reportedly honored that condition by exhibiting the mummy to raise funds for church construction in Tennessee. After the fundraising exhibitions concluded, the remains were returned to Bessemer, Alabama, where they were placed on display at the Bessemer Hall of History. The mummy remained there for many years as a local attraction.

== Scientific analysis ==
Farris' remains were examined as part of the National Geographic Channel television series The Mummy Road Show. Researchers conducted a physical examination and used X-rays, CT scans and video endoscopy to examine the skeleton and preserved internal organs. An autopsy and laboratory analysis of a skin sample were also performed.

The examination found that the body had been preserved soon after death. Although researchers found no obvious incision through which embalming fluid had been introduced, the brain, eyes and internal organs remained unusually well preserved. The lungs, heart, blood vessels, liver, stomach, intestines, uterus and urinary bladder could still be identified.

Laboratory analysis detected arsenic in a skin sample. Researchers concluded that arsenic had been an ingredient in the embalming fluid, rather than evidence that Farris had swallowed the poison before her death as claimed in the story associated with the exhibit.

The examination also confirmed that the ring finger of Farris' right hand had been amputated before her death. Minor regrowth of bone showed that the injury had begun to heal, but the researchers did not determine how or when the finger had been removed.

During the autopsy, researchers found extensive adhesions and consolidation in the lungs. They concluded that Farris had likely died from severe pneumonia, rather than arsenic poisoning. The findings supported the conclusion that her body had been embalmed with an arsenic-based fluid shortly after death.

== Final disposition ==
Almost a century after Farris' death, her remains were examined for the National Geographic Channel documentary The Mummy Road Show. Following the documentary, the owners chose to have the remains cremated, bringing nearly 96 years of public exhibition to an end. According to local accounts, the cremation was carried out by the remains' owners in Nashville, Tennessee.

== Sources ==
- Katz, Elaine S. (Winter 1978) "Variation as Relative Perception in the Legend of Hazel Farris". Mid-South Folklore Vol. 6, No. 3, pp. 55–64
- Abrams, Vivi. (November 1, 2004) "Bessemer mummy legend endures." Birmingham News.
- "National Geographic probes story of Ada mummy." Claremore Daily Progress
- "An Unwanted Mummy". The Mummy Road Show Episode 12. National Geographic Channel (April 1, 2002)
- Quigley, Christine. (1998) Modern Mummies: The Preservation of the Human Body in the Twentieth Century. Jefferson, North Carolina: McFarland & Company. ISBN 0-7864-0492-2
- Conlogue, Jeremy and Ron Beckett. (September 2005) Mummy Dearest:How Two Guys in a Potato Chip Truck Changed the Way the Living See the Dead ISBN 1-59228-544-9
