= Farris, Minnesota =

Unincorporated community in Minnesota, United States

Farris
- Unincorporated community
- Location within Minnesota Location within the United States
- Coordinates: 47°22′36″N 94°42′10″W
- Country: United States
- State: Minnesota
- County: Beltrami
- Elevation: 1,362 ft (415 m)
- Time zone: UTC-6 (Central (CST))
  - Summer (DST): UTC-5 (CDT)
- Area code: 218
- GNIS feature ID: 656206

Farris is an unincorporated community in Hubbard County, in the U.S. state of Minnesota.

== History ==
A post office called Graceland was established in 1887, the name was changed to Farris in 1898, and the post office closed in 1915. Farris was a station on the Great Northern and Soo railroads.

Historical population
Census	Pop.	Note	%±
1900	135		—
1910	143		5.9%
1920	84		−41.3%
U.S. Decennial Census
