= Bessemer Hall of History =

- Southern Railway Terminal Station
- U.S. National Register of Historic Places
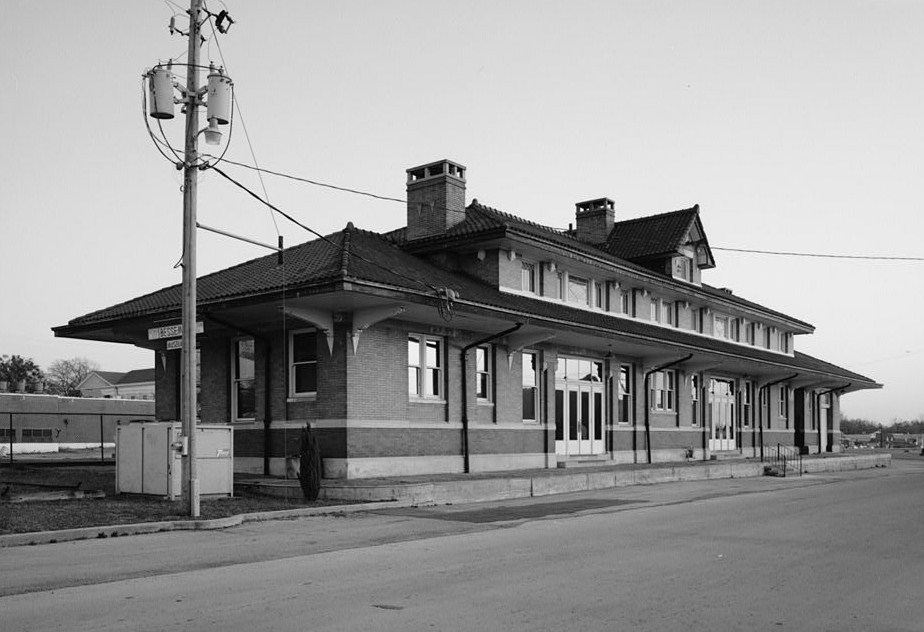
- Southern Railway Depot

- Location within Alabama Location within the United States
- Location: 1905 Alabama Ave., Bessemer, Alabama
- Coordinates: 33°24′4″N 86°57′1″W
- Area: less than one acre
- Built: 1916
- NRHP reference No.: 73000348
- Added to NRHP: February 28, 1973

The Bessemer Hall of History is a museum located in, and devoted to the history of, the city of Bessemer, Alabama.

The museum is housed in the former Alabama Great Southern Railroad (later Southern Railway) depot in downtown Bessemer. The depot, built by the AGS in 1916, served passengers until the Amtrak era began in the early 1970s. The building sat unused for several years, but was reopened by the city of Bessemer in 1985, and officially rededicated during the city's centennial observance in 1987. The museum houses a wide array of artifacts from the city's history as a mining, steelmaking, and industrial center. The building also houses artifacts relating to the brief imprisonment of Martin Luther King Jr. in the city. The building was listed on the National Register of Historic Places in 1973 as Southern Railway Terminal Station.

| Preceding station | Southern Railway | Following station |
|---|---|---|
| Mobile Junction toward New Orleans | New Orleans – Cincinnati | Grasselli toward Cincinnati |
