= Network-enabled weapon =

Network-enabled weapons are a class of air-to-ground precision-guided munitions that are being developed by a number of countries. A derivative of GPS-guided weapons, which are guided to a specific coordinate entered prior to release, network-enabled weapons have the additional ability to have targeting coordinates updated in flight through the use of a common datalink, and be tracked by aircraft and other platforms logged into the same network. Previous weapons have used datalink to provide updated target information in flight (e.g. AMRAAM), but the creation of a common datalink allows control of the weapon to be passed from one platform to another, for example from an aircraft that launches the weapons to a ground party that is in visual contact with an enemy tank formation.

The concept for network-enabled weapons originated at the U.S. Air Force's Air Combat Command headquarters in 2003 as a solution to the problem of attacking moving targets in all-weather, high-threat environments. The Air Force's Air Armament Center refined the idea and in late 2003 declared network-enabled weapons to be the "single most cost effective means available for enhancing overall armament capability."

An Advanced Concept Technology Demonstration was funded in 2005 to develop the miniaturized radio that would be needed and demonstrate the feasibility of the concept. Subsequently, the requirements for the Small Diameter Bomb Increment 2 were modified to incorporate the capability. Later weapons incorporating this technology include the AGM-154 Joint Standoff Weapon (JSOW C-1) and the Turkish Air Force's SOM cruise missile.
