= Jack K. Farris =

Recipient of the Purple Heart medal

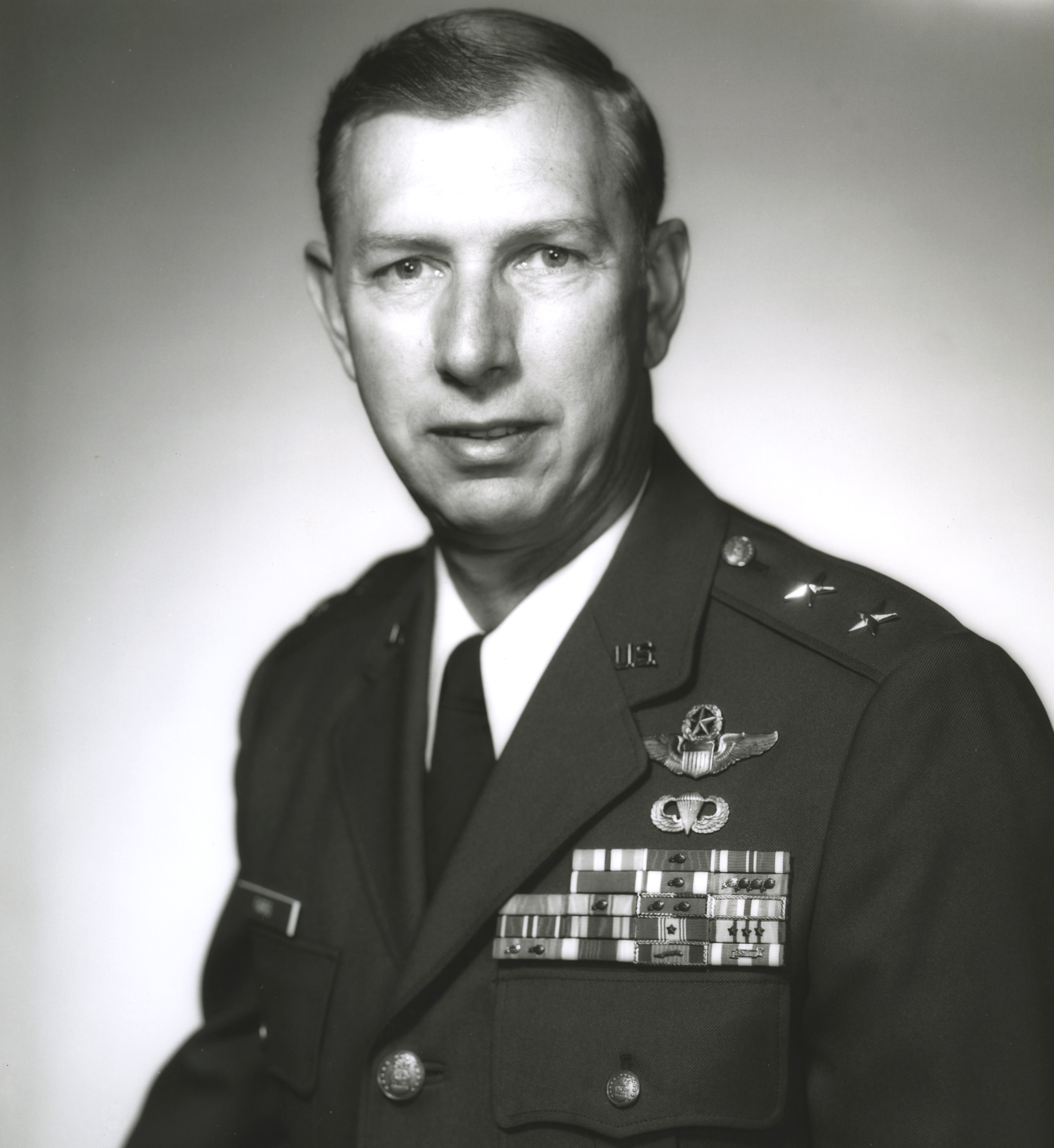
- Born: May 6, 1934 (age 92); Fennimore, Wisconsin
- Military career
- Allegiance: United States of America
- Branch: United States Air Force
- Rank: Major general

Jack Kyle Farris (born May 6, 1934) is a retired major general in the United States Air Force.

== Biography ==
Farris was born in Fennimore, Wisconsin, in 1934. He attended the University of Southern California and Dartmouth College.

Farris married his wife, Nina, in 1958. They had two children together, a son, Kyle Farris, and a daughter, Karen Farris Luce. Jack and Nina Farris have four grandchildren, five great-grandsons and currently reside in Florida.

== Career ==
Farris graduated from the United States Military Academy in 1957. Later he graduated from the Squadron Officer School, the Industrial College of the Armed Forces, and the Air War College. In 1964 he was assigned to the United States Air Force Academy as an air officer commanding. During the Vietnam War he served with the 12th Air Commando Squadron. Later he was named Deputy Commandant of the Cadet Wing and of Military Instruction at the Air Force Academy. From 1979 to 1981 he held command of the 2nd Bombardment Wing. In 1984 he was named Deputy Chief of Staff for Strategic Planning and Analysis of the Strategic Air Command. Later he became vice commander of the 15th Air Force. His retirement was effective as of September 1, 1989.

Awards he has received include the Defense Superior Service Medal, the Legion of Merit with oak leaf cluster, the Distinguished Flying Cross, the Purple Heart, the Meritorious Service Medal with oak leaf cluster, the Air Medal with silver oak leaf cluster and four bronze oak leaf clusters, the Air Force Commendation Medal with oak leaf cluster, the Combat Readiness Medal, the Parachutist Badge, and the Missile Badge.
