= William Farrish =

American politician

Member of the Washington House of Representatives for the 8th district
- In office 1889–1895

Personal details
- Born: August 9, 1835 Richibucto, New Brunswick
- Died: June 12, 1920 (aged 84) Asotin, Washington, United States
- Party: Republican

William Farrish (August 9, 1835 – June 12, 1920) was an American politician in the state of Washington. He served in the Washington House of Representatives from 1889 to 1895.
