= 12th Airborne Command and Control Squadron =

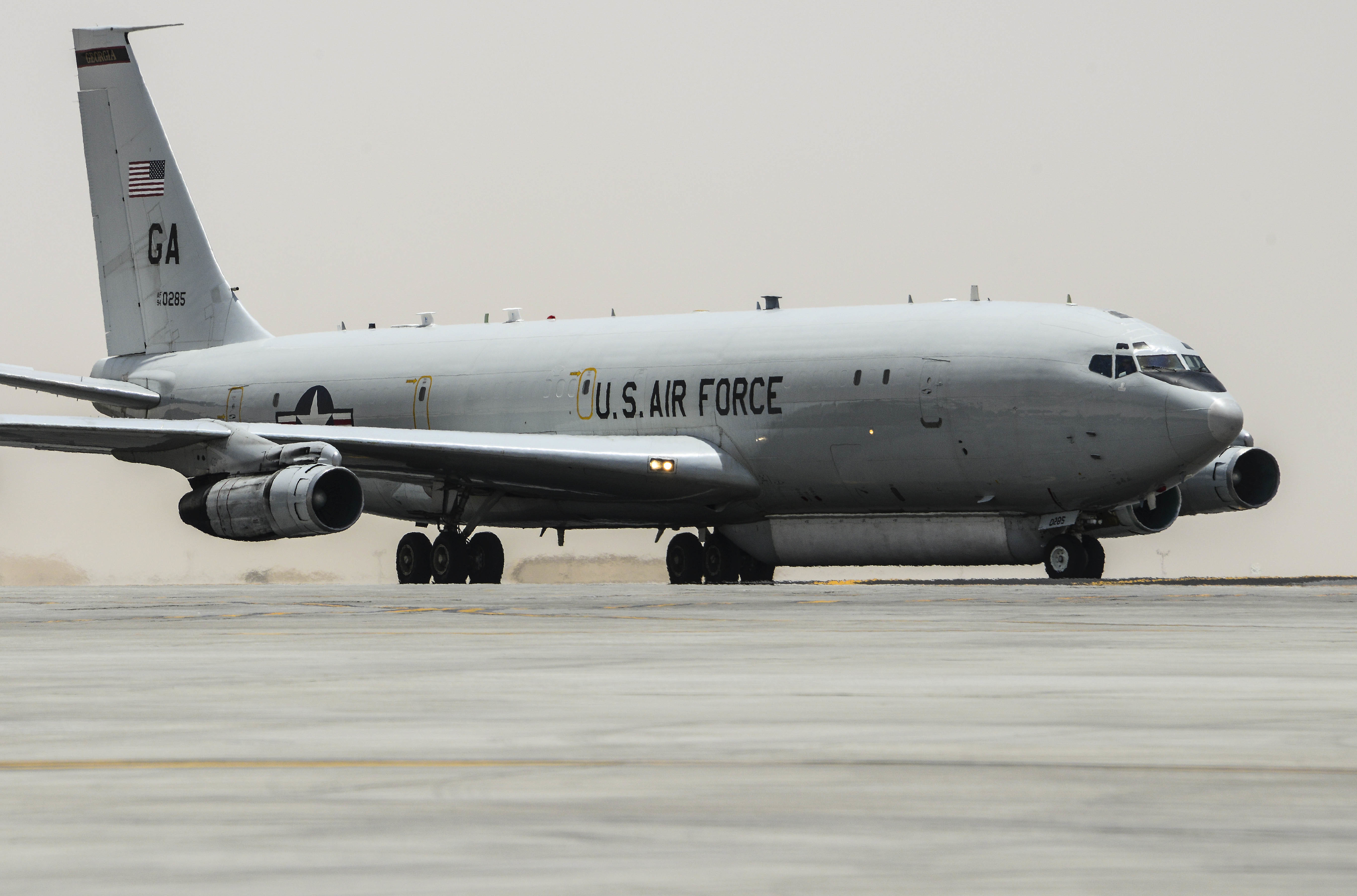
- E-8C JSTARS
- Active: 1942–1944; 1944–1945; 1966–1970; 1996–2024
- Country: United States
- Branch: United States Air Force
- Role: Antisubmarine warfare Airlift Defoliation Command and control
- Mottos: Draconis Vigilantis (Latin for 'Vigilant Dragons')
- Colors: (1966–1970)
- Engagements: European Theater of Operations; Mediterranean Theater of Operations Vietnam War
- Decorations: Distinguished Unit Citation; Presidential Unit Citation; Air Force Outstanding Unit Award with Combat "V" Device; Vietnamese Gallantry Cross with Palm

Commanders
- Current commander: Lt Col Gerry Thompson

Insignia
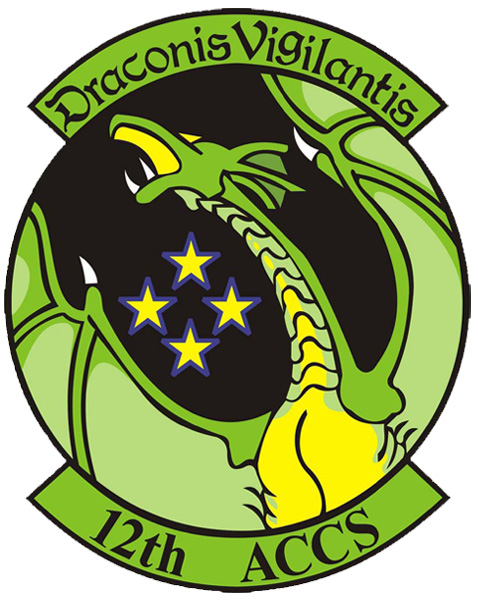
- 12th Airborne Command and Control Squadron emblem (Note: Approved 12 April 2000.)

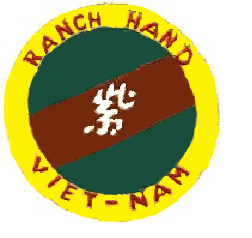
- 12th Air Commando Squadron unofficial emblem (Note: The emblem was previously used by 309th Air Commando Squadron Special Aerial Spray Flight. The green disc represents the jungle, while the brown bend sinister is a defoliated strip. The Chinese logogram for "purple" is in the center. Purple was the generic name used by Ranch Hand personnel for all defoliants.)

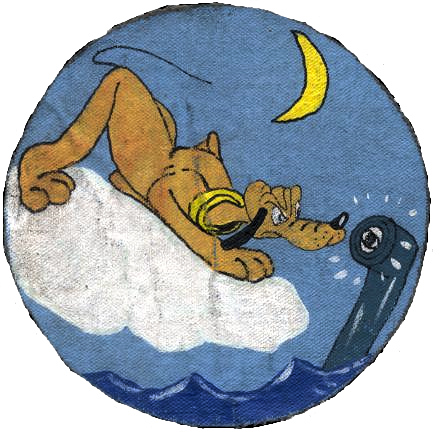
- 2d Antisubmarine Squadron emblem

The 12th Airborne Command and Control Squadron was a United States Air Force flying unit, assigned to the 461st Air Control Wing, stationed at Robins Air Force Base, Georgia. The squadron flew the Northrop Grumman E-8 Joint STARS (Joint Surveillance Target Attack Radar System), providing airborne battle management, command and control, surveillance, and target acquisition. The J-STARS radar system detected, located, classified, tracked and targeted ground movements, communicating information through secure data links with other command posts.

The squadron squadron had three predecessors, which were consolidated into a single unit in 1985. The squadron's first predecessor was activated in 1942 as the 523d Bombardment Squadron. Redesignated the 2d Antisubmarine Squadron, it engaged in anti-submarine warfare in the Atlantic, operating from bases in the United States, United Kingdom, and French Morocco. It earned a Distinguished Unit Citation before returning to the United States, where it was disbanded and its personnel became cadres for new heavy bomber groups.

The 327th Ferrying Squadron was the squadron's second predecessor. It provided airlift in The Mediterranean Theater of Operations from 1944 to the end of World War II, when it returned to the United States for inactivation.

The third predecessor was organized in Viet Nam in 1966 as the 12th Air Commando Squadron (later 12th Special Operations Squadron). Until inactivating in 1970, the squadron conducted defoliation missions in Southeast Asia. It was awarded four Presidential Unit Citations, an Air Force Outstanding Unit Award with Combat "V" device and the Vietnamese Gallantry Cross with Palm for its combat actions.

== History ==
=== Antisubmarine warfare ===
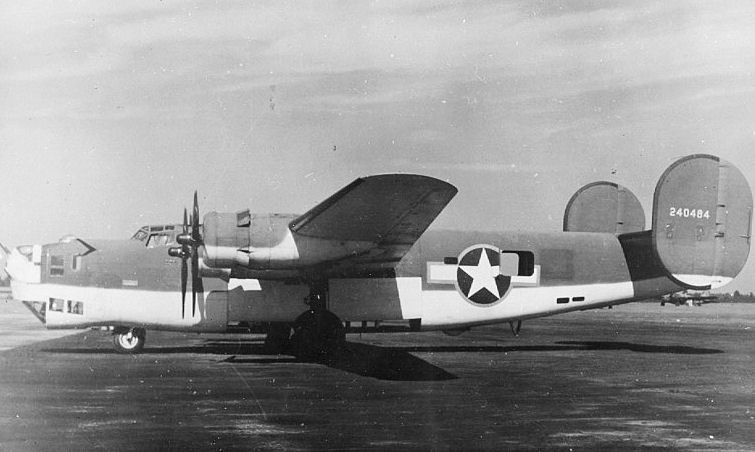
Antisubmarine B-24

The first predecessor of the squadron was activated at Langley Field, Virginia in October 1942 as the 523d Bombardment Squadron, one of the original squadrons of the 378th Bombardment Group. One month later, it was redesignated the 2d Antisubmarine Squadron. The squadron was initially equipped with a number of different types of bombers, but by the end of the year had standardized on the Consolidated B-24 Liberator. With the 378th, the squadron engaged in antisubmarine patrols off the east coast of the United States. When the 378th Group was inactivated in December, the unit was assigned directly to the 25th Antisubmarine Wing, which was responsible for Army Air Forces antisubmarine operations off the Atlantic coast of the United States.

In January 1943, it moved to RAF St Eval, Cornwall, being the first of four antisubmarine squadrons to arrive there to participate in the Battle of the Atlantic. From St Eval it began flying antisubmarine patrols around England. Although the squadron remained assigned to the 25th Wing, at St Eval, it was attached to the provisional 1st Antisubmarine Group.

In March 1943, the squadron moved to Craw Field, near Port Lyautey, French Morocco, where it was attached to the 2037th Antisubmarine Wing, another provisional organization, until being reassigned to the newly activated 480th Antisubmarine Group. Its mission was to patrol an area of the Atlantic north and west of Morocco. Its antisubmarine activity reached a peak in July, when German U-boats concentrated off the coast of Portugal to intercept Allied convoys bound for the Mediterranean. Its actions protected supply lines for forces involved in Operation Husky, the invasion of Sicily. The unit most frequently attacked enemy subs 700 miles off the coast of Spain, in what was termed, the "Coffin Corner." This was an area in which the subs surfaced to recharge their batteries. It was also possible to attack them in this location before they joined up into wolfpacks. The 2d Squadron earned a Distinguished Unit Citation for its combat contributions in the Battle of the Atlantic against German submarines.

The squadron returned to the United States at end of 1943 and was disbanded at Clovis Army Air Field in January 1944. Most of the unit's aircrews became cadres for Boeing B-29 Superfortress unit at Clovis.

=== Airlift operations in the Mediterranean Theater ===
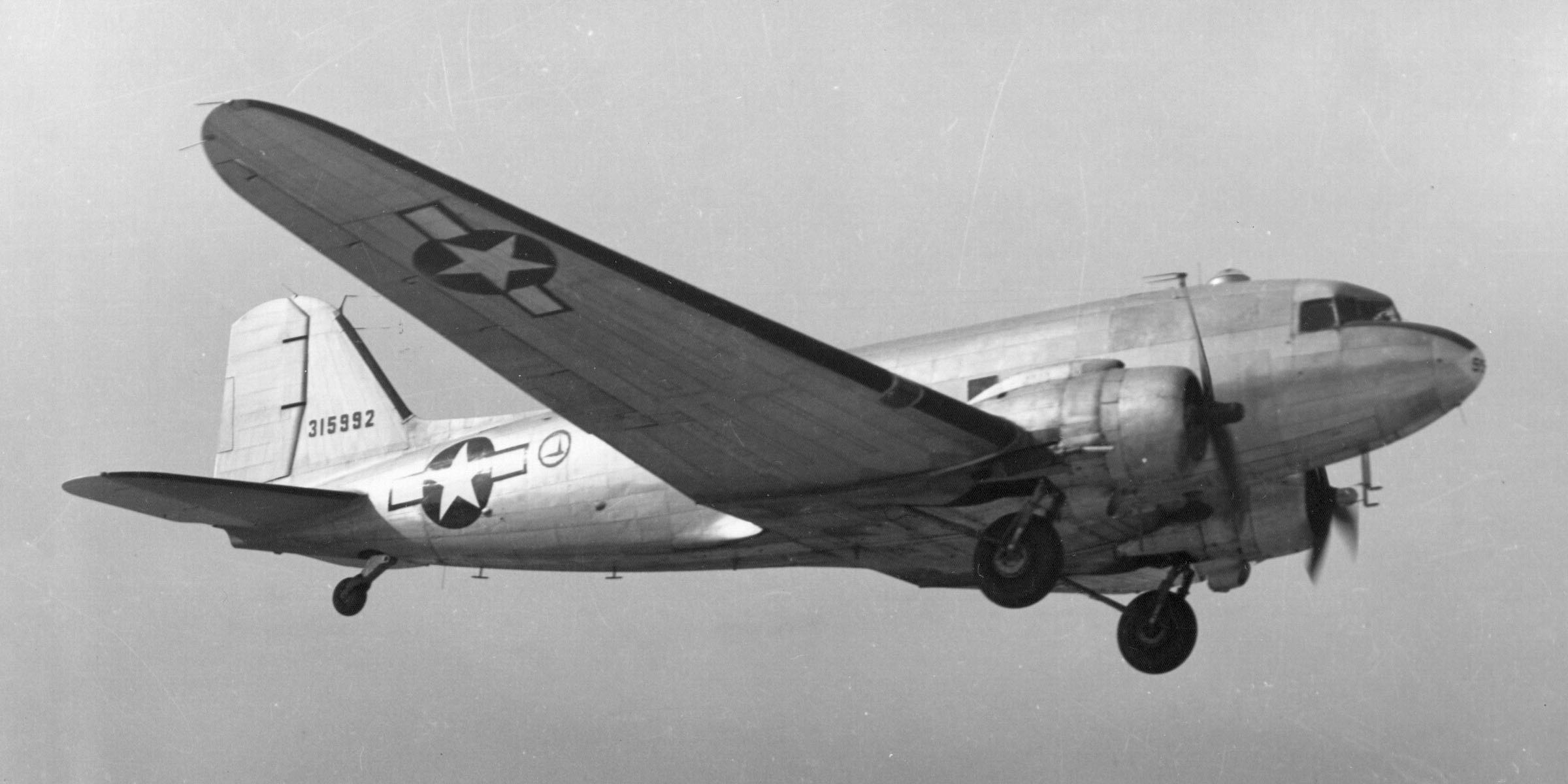
Douglas C-47

The 327th Ferrying Squadron, which was activated at Capodichino Air Base, Italy on 31 May 1944 is the second forerunner of the squadron. The 327th flew cargo, passengers, and mail to destinations in Italy, Sardinia, Corsica, North Africa, and southern France. It moved to the United States in late September 1945 and was inactivated in October.

=== Operation Ranch Hand ===
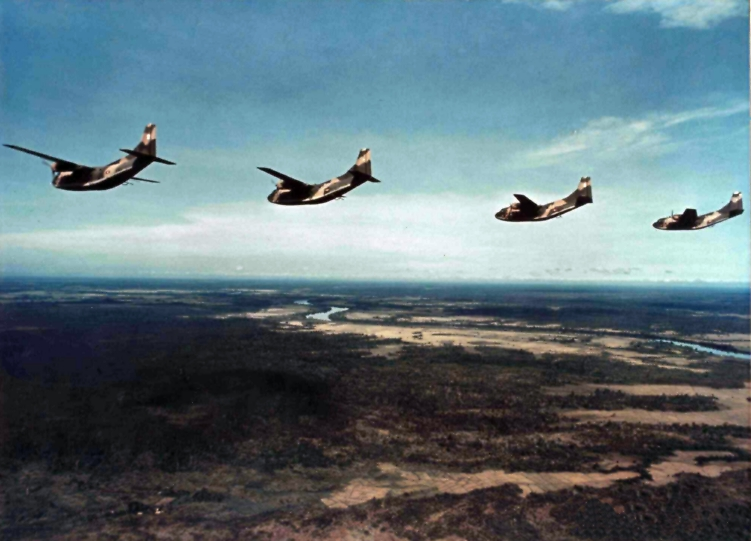
Squadron UC-123B aircraft over Vietnam

In the fall of 1966 Operation Ranch Hand expanded its size with the delivery of eleven additional Fairchild UC-123B Provider aircraft that had been authorized earlier in the year. As a result, the Special Aerial Spray Flight of the 309th Air Commando Squadron expanded to a full squadron at Tan Son Nhut Airport, being replaced by the 12th Air Commando Squadron on 15 October 1966. Sixteen days later, the squadron suffered its first loss when an aircraft was shot down in the Iron Triangle. The expansion to squadron strength led to the expansion of the unit's defoliation mission to area targets, such as War Zone C, War Zone D and the Mekong Delta, in addition to clearing lines of communication. Due to crowding at Tan Son Nhut, also Saigon's commercial airport, the squadron moved to Bien Hoa Air Base in December.

In October 1966, the squadron also began flying insecticide missions. These missions focused on killing malaria spreading mosquitos. A single aircraft was dedicated to this mission, since the application rate of insecticide was much lower than that for herbicides and one mission could cover a large area. Because of the corrosive effects of the insecticide on aircraft camouflage paint, an uncamouflaged aircraft was eventually settled on to fly these missions. (Note: This aircraft, built as Fairchild C-123B-17-FA, serial 56-4362, Patches is on display at the National Museum of the United States Air Force. Buckingham states that workers had stripped Patches of its camouflage paint, but there is no evidence that the plane was camouflaged while in Vietnam. Buckingham, p. 124. It was modified as UC-123B c. 1962 (spray equipment installed); UC-123K in 1968 (jet engines installed); C-123K c. Jan 1973 (spray equipment removed). When withdrawn from Vietnam in 1972, it was diverted to spray insecticide during a plague of locusts in Afghanistan and Iran, returning to the United States via Europe. It is believed to be the only C-123 to have flown completely around the world. Baugher, Joe (14 February 2023). "1956 USAF Serial Numbers". Joe Baugher. Archived from the original on 7 October 2011. The aircraft took almost 600 hits in combat, and it was named "Patches" for the damage repairs that covered it. Seven of its crew received the Purple Heart for wounds received in battle. It carries VNAF national markings. Patches served in the Air Force Reserve as a C-123K from 1972 until it was retired to the museum in 1980.)

In February 1967, the squadron flew its first mission in the southern portion of the Demilitarized zone (DMZ) between North and South Vietnam. Infiltration through the DMZ posed a significant threat to forces in the I Corps area, but the sensitivity of defoliation in an area so near North Vietnam had delayed operations there. By the late summer, selected targets in the northern portion of the DMZ and nearby infiltration routes within North Vietnam had been added to the target list. DMZ operations were flown from the operating location the squadron maintained at Da Nang Air Base.

The squadron participated in Operation Pink Rose in late 1966 and early 1967. Pink Rose was an attempt to burn forested areas. In this operation, the unit applied two treatments to the target areas with defoliants. Boeing B-52 Stratofortresses then dropped incendiary bombs to ignite fires in the area. Results were disappointing and no further efforts were made to use forest fire as a method of stripping jungle canopies.

In addition to defoliation, the 12th also flew crop destruction missions. Crop destruction missions were flown with planes displaying South Vietnamese markings, and a Republic of Vietnam Air Force member flew on board the lead aircraft. These missions were intended to reduce the amount of food available to Viet Cong forces and to increase the cost of food procurement. Seventh Air Force also found that the missions caused the Viet Cong to divert forces from combat and devote them to raising food. In contrast, a study by the RAND Corporation questioned the effectiveness of these missions, and concluded they increased hostility toward Americans.

In January 1968, the squadron flew 589 sorties on target, the most it would fly during the war. However, on 31 January, its base at Bien Hoa was subjected to intense rocket and mortar attack as part of the Tet Offensive, halting operations. On 2 February, the squadron resumed operations, including emergency airlift missions. Six days later, Military Assistance Command Vietnam directed that the spray tanks be removed from the squadron's aircraft and its planes be devoted to airlift. No operations were flown on 28 February, when another rocket attack destroyed four buildings housing squadron aircrew and heavily damaged another. The squadron flew 2866 airlift sorties during the Tet Offensive before returning to the defoliation mission in mid-March.

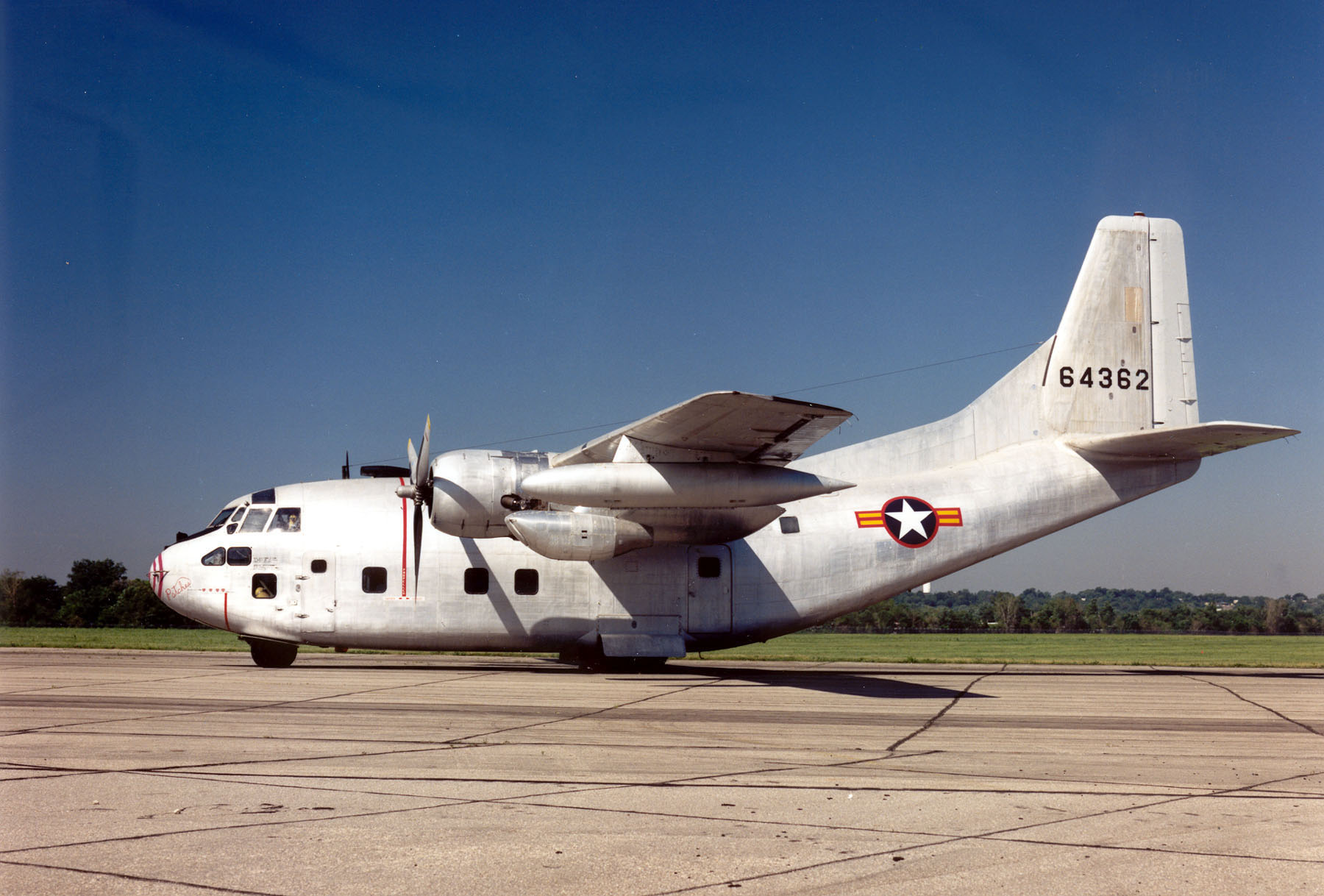
Patches after conversion to C-123K

Later in 1968, the unit added Nha Trang Air Base and Phu Cat Air Base to Da Nang as staging areas for defoliation operations as missions clearing friendly lines of communication again took precedence over the area targets of the previous two years. Targets also shifted away from the heavily populated III Corps zone. In May, the squadron received its first UC-123K, equipped with two additional General Electric J85 engines, which greatly reduced the planes' vulnerability to loss of an engine. This conversion was completed by April 1969. By this time, the squadron had lost six UC-123Bs on combat missions.

During February 1969, in anticipation of a repeat of the previous year's offensive, the squadron deployed to Phan Rang Air Base, returning to Bien Hoa in early March. As the Nixon administration implemented its plan for American withdrawal from Vietnam, pressure to reduce the squadron's operations increased. Squadron sorties were to be reduced by 30% by July 1970 and in view of the reduction, eleven Providers were transferred to other units in the 315th Special Operations Wing in November. The squadron also lost Nha Trang as a staging base when it was transferred to the South Vietnamese air force. In April 1970, the squadron was notified that the Joint Chiefs of Staff had decided that Agent Orange was no longer to be used. On 9 May, the 12th exhausted its supply of Agent White and flew its last defoliation mission. From 11 May to 6 July, the squadron flew leaflet and flare missions over Cambodia. The reduced insecticide and crop destruction missions no longer required a separate squadron, so the unit moved to Phan Rang, where its personnel and equipment were absorbed by Flight A of the 310th Special Operations Squadron. It became non-operational at the end of July and was inactivated in September 1970.

In its four years of operations, the 12th was awarded four Presidential Unit Citations, an Air Force Outstanding Unit Award with Combat "V" Device and several Vietnamese Gallantry Cross with Palm. (Note: Dollman lists a single award. However, "AF Pamphlet 900-2, Unit Decorations, Awards and Campaign Participation Credits, Vol II" (PDF). Washington, DC: Department of the Air Force. 30 September 1976. Archived from the original (PDF) on 4 August 2015. lists a total of five.)

=== Airborne command and control ===
In September 1985, the 2d Antisubmarine Squadron and 327th Ferrying Squadron were reconstituted and consolidated with the 12th Special Operations Squadron, and the consolidated unit designated the 12th Airborne Command and Control Squadron. However, the squadron remained inactive until January 1996, when it was activated to fly Northrop Grumman E-8 Joint STARS aircraft as part of the 93d Operations Group for air control and target attack radar system.

In 2002, the JSTARS mission was transferred to the Georgia Air National Guard and the squadron was transferred to the Guard as part of the 116th Operations Group. (Note: The squadron kept its designation, and was not renumbered in the block of numbers (101–300) allotted to the Air National Guard.) This arrangement was reversed in 2011, and the squadron returned to the regular Air Force in 2011.

Following the retirement of the E-8C, the 12th ACCS was inactivated on 12 April 2024.

== Lineage ==
2d Antisubmarine Squadron

- Constituted as the 523d Bombardment Squadron (Heavy) on 13 October 1942

Activated on 18 October 1942
Redesignated 2d Antisubmarine Squadron (Heavy) on 23 November 1942

- Disbanded on 29 January 1944
- Reconstituted on 19 September 1985 and consolidated with the 327th Ferrying Squadron and the 12th Special Operations Squadron as the 12th Airborne Command and Control Squadron

327th Ferrying Squadron

- Constituted as the 327th Ferrying Squadron on 12 May 1944

Activated on 31 May 1944
Inactivated on 5 October 1945

- Disbanded on 8 October 1948
- Reconstituted on 19 September 1985 and consolidated with the 2d Antisubmarine Squadron and the 12th Special Operations Squadron as the 12th Airborne Command and Control Squadron

12th Airborne Command and Control Squadron

- Constituted as the 12th Air Commando Squadron (Defoliation) and activated on 26 August 1966 (not organized)

Organized on 15 October 1966
Redesignated 12th Special Operations Squadron on 1 August 1968
Inactivated on 30 September 1970

- Consolidated with the 2d Antisubmarine Squadron and the 327th Ferrying Squadron as the 12th Airborne Command and Control Squadron on 19 September 1985

Activated on 29 January 1996

- Allotted to the Air National Guard on 1 October 2002
- Withdrawn from the Air National Guard on 1 October 2011
- Inactivated on 12 April 2024

=== Assignments ===
- 378th Bombardment Group, 18 October 1942
- 25th Antisubmarine Wing, 14 December 1942 (attached to VIII Bomber Command, c. 2 January 1942, 1st Antisubmarine Group (Provisional), 15 January 1942, 2037th Antisubmarine Wing (Provisional), 1 March 1943 – 21 June 1943)
- 480th Antisubmarine Group, 21 June 1943 – 29 January 1944
- Mediterranean Air Transport Service, 31 May 1944
- XII Air Force Service Command, c. 15 September – 5 October 1945
- Pacific Air Forces, 26 August 1966 (not organized)
- 315th Air Commando Wing (later 315th Special Operations Wing, 315th Tactical Airlift Wing), 15 October 1966 – 30 September 1970
- 93d Operations Group, 29 January 1996
- 116th Operations Group, 1 October 2002
- 461st Operations Group, 1 October 2011

=== Stations ===
- Langley Field, Virginia, 18 October – 26 December 1942
- RAF St Eval (Station 129), England, 2 January 1943
- Craw Field, Port Lyautey, French Morocco, c. 11 March – 25 November 1943 (air echelon operated from Agadir, French Morocco, in July 1943)
- Clovis Army Air Field, New Mexico, c. 4 – 29 January 1944
- Capodichino Air Base, Naples, Italy, 31 May 1944 – 5 October 1945 (Note: Dollman states that the squadron returned to the United States in September, but does not give a station.)
- Tan Son Nhut Airport, South Vietnam, 15 October 1966
- Bien Hoa Air Base, South Vietnam, 1 December 1966
- Phan Rang Air Base, South Vietnam, 10 July – 30 September 1970
- Robins Air Force Base, Georgia, 29 Jan 1996 – present

=== Aircraft ===
- Boeing B-17 Flying Fortress, 1942
- Douglas B-18 Bolo, 1942
- Lockheed B-34 Lexington, 1942
- Consolidated B-24 Liberator, 1942–1944
- Curtiss P-40 Warhawk, 1944
- Douglas C-47 Skytrain, 1944–1945
- Curtiss C-46 Commando, 1945
- Fairchild UC-123B Provider, 1966–1978
- Fairchild UC-123K Provider, 1968–1970
- Northrop Grumman E-8 Joint STARS, 1996–present

=== Awards and campaigns ===
Award streamer	Award	Dates	Notes
	Presidential Unit Citation	European Theater of Operations and North Africa 16 January 1943 – 28 October 1943	2d Antisubmarine Squadron
	Distinguished Unit Citation	Southeast Asia 15 October 1966 – 30 June 1967	12th Air Commando Squadron
	Distinguished Unit Citation	Southeast Asia 21 January 1968 – 12 May 1968	12th Air Commando Squadron
	Distinguished Unit Citation	Southeast Asia 15 May 1968 – 15 April 1969	12th Air Commando Squadron (later 12th Special Operations Squadron)
	Distinguished Unit Citation	Southeast Asia 1 April 1970 – 30 June 1970	12th Special Operations Squadron
	Air Force Outstanding Unit Award with Combat "V" Device	15 October 1966 – 30 April 1967	12th Air Commando Squadron
	Air Force Outstanding Unit Award	29 January 1996 – 31 May 1997	12th Airborne Command and Control Squadron
	Air Force Outstanding Unit Award	1 June 1997 – 31 May 1999	12th Airborne Command and Control Squadron
	Air Force Outstanding Unit Award	31 August 2004 – 31 May 2006	12th Airborne Command and Control Squadron
	Air Force Outstanding Unit Award	1 June 2006 – 31 May 2007	12th Airborne Command and Control Squadron
	Air Force Outstanding Unit Award	1 June 2013 – 31 May 2014	12th Airborne Command and Control Squadron
	Vietnamese Gallantry Cross with Palm	(Note: Kane lists one award for 15 October 1966 – 31 July 1970. Air Force Pamphlet 900-2 lists five awards, for 15 October 1966 – 31 July 1966, 15 October 1966 – 1 August 1968, 1 May 1968 – 31 July 1970, 1 June 1969 – 1 June 1970, 1 May 1968 – 31 July 1970. The AF Personnel Center database lists two awards, for 15 October 1966 – 1 August 1968 and 1 May 1968 – 31 July 1970.)	12th Air Commando Squadron (later 12th Special Operations Squadron)

Campaign Streamer	Campaign	Dates	Notes
	Antisubmarine	18 October 1942 – 26 December 1942	523d Bombardment Squadron (later 2d Antisubmarine Squadron)
	Air Offensive, Europe	2 January 1943 – 25 November 1943	2d Antisubmarine Squadron
	Antisubmarine, EAME Theater	2 January 1943 – 25 November 1943	2d Antisubmarine Squadron
	Rhineland	15 September 1944 – 21 March 1945	327th Ferrying Squadron
	Air Combat, EAME Theater	2 January 1943 – 24 November 1943, 31 May 1944 – 11 May 1945	2d Antisubmarine Squadron, 327th Ferrying Squadron
	Rome-Arno	31 May 1944 – 9 September 1944	327th Ferrying Squadron
	Po Valley	3 April 1945 – 8 May 1945	327th Ferrying Squadron
	Vietnam Air Offensive	15 October 1966 – 8 March 1967	12th Air Commando Squadron
	Vietnam Air Offensive, Phase II	9 March 1967 – 31 March 1968	12th Air Commando Squadron
	Vietnam Air/Ground	22 January 1968 – 7 July 1968	12th Air Commando Squadron
	Vietnam Air Offensive, Phase III	1 April 1968 – 31 October 1968	12th Air Commando Squadron (later 12th Special Operations Squadron)
	Vietnam Air Offensive, Phase IV	1 November 1968 – 22 February 1969	12th Special Operations Squadron
	Tet 1969/Counteroffensive	23 February 1969 – 8 June 1969	12th Special Operations Squadron
	Vietnam Summer-Fall 1969	9 June 1969 – 31 October 1969	12th Special Operations Squadron
	Vietnam Winter-Spring 1970	3 November 1969 – 30 April 1970	12th Special Operations Squadron
	Sanctuary Counteroffensive	1 May 1970 – 30 June 1970	12th Special Operations Squadron
	Southwest Monsoon	1 July 1970 – 31 July 1970	12th Special Operations Squadron
	Kosovo Air	undetermined	12th Airborne Command and Control Squadron
	Global War on Terror Expeditionary Medal	undetermined	12th Expeditionary Airborne Command and Control Squadron (Note: This campaign credit was earned by an expeditionary unit for which the squadron was the primary force provider and is bestowed on the squadron.)

== Commanders of the 12th Airborne Command and Control Squadron ==
The commander of the 12th Airborne Command and Control Squadron is an air force position held by a lieutenant colonel. The 12 ACCS is responsible for organizing, equipping, and ensuring the combat capability of more than 200 airmen in the Air Force's first E-8C Joint Surveillance Target Attack Radar System operational squadron.

	Commander	From	Through		Commander	From	Through
1	Charles Freniere	June, 1996	January, 1998	8	Bill Gould	June, 2008	April, 2010
2	Gordon McKay	January, 1998	October, 1999	9	Chris Blaney	April, 2010	April, 2012
3	Mark Hall	October, 1999	November, 2000	10	Max Weems	April, 2012	April, 2014
4	Tom Wozinak	November, 2000	November, 2002	11	Christopher Clark	April, 2014	April, 2016
5	Mick Quintrall	November, 2002	October, 2004	12	Nelson Rouleau	April, 2016	April, 2018
6	Kelly Noler	October, 2004	June, 2006	13	Bobby Hunt	April, 2018	April, 2020
7	Henry Cyr	June, 2006	June, 2008	14	Vida Roeder	April, 2020	April, 2022
15	Gerry Thompson	April, 2022	April, 2024				
