= AN/APG-76 radar family =

Military aircraft multimode radar family

The AN/APG-76 radar is a pulse Doppler K_{u} band multi-mode radar developed and manufactured by Northrop Grumman.

== AN/APQ-92 ==
The first radar of the radar family AN/APG-76 belongs to is AN/APQ-92, which equipped A-6A. AN/APQ-92 is a search and navigational radar, with function called search radar terrain clearance (SRTC) to generate a synthetic terrain display on the pilot's Vertical Display Indicator (VDI), which is a large cathode ray tube (CRT) display in the center of the pilot's console, right under the gun sight. The display showed vertical terrain development in a 53 degree by 26 degree window about the projected flight path. If the Intruder was heading for a valley between two hills, the pilot would see return generally in the shape of two hills (one on either side of the display), with a curving "V" notch in the center between them. The limitation of SRTC is in its inability to detect smaller artificial features - like cables suspend across a valley.

AN/APQ-92 is part of DIANE (Digital Integrated Attack/Navigation Devices), which consists of multiple radars: the Norden AN/APQ-92 search and navigation radar, the separate AN/APQ-88 for tracking/attacking, AN/APN-141 radar altimeter, & AN/APN-122 navigational radar to provide position updates to the AN/ASN-31 inertial navigation system.

== AN/APQ-103 ==
AN/APQ-103 is the successor of AN/APQ-92, and it is used in conjunction with AN/APN-153 Doppler navigational radar that replaced earlier AN/APN-122, and AN/APQ-112 radar replaced AN/APQ-88. The APQ-103/APN-153/APQ-112 upgrade is part of the improvement of DIANE installed on A-6B.

== AN/APQ-112 ==
AN/APQ-112 is a tracking radar that replaced earlier AN/APQ-88 radar developed by Naval Avionics. While the AN/APQ-88 could only track moving targets, the APQ-112 could track stationary targets as well, and it had slightly better resolution and greater reliability than AN/APQ-88.

AN/APQ-112 not only could perform all functions of AN/APQ-88, but was also capable of performing some functions of AN/APQ-103. As more advanced version of AN/APQ-112 was developed, it replaced AN/APQ-103. However, the attempt to replace two separate radars failed at the time due to increased mission requirement, and a separate dedicated fire control radar was needed. As a result, the vastly improved Sperry Corporation AN/APQ-127 was adopted, while AN/APN-186 navigational radar replacing earlier AN/APN-153 in earlier A-6B. APN-186/APQ-112/APQ-127 suit is designed as part of A-6C specially dedicated for night attack missions against the Ho Chi Minh Trail in Vietnam.

== AN/APQ-129 ==
AN/APQ-129 is a derivative of AN/APQ-112 for EA-6A, allowing EA-6A to fire AGM-45 Shrike anti-radiation missile (ARM), though this was never done in real combat.

== AN/APQ-148 ==
The J-band AN/APQ-148 is the first one in the radar family that had achieved the capability to replace two separate radars with a single multi-function radar. AN/APQ-148 was the original radar on board the A-6E.

== AN/APQ-156 ==
AN/APQ-156 is the development of AN/APQ-148, and it is used in conjunction with Target Recognition and Attack Multi-Sensor" (TRAM) system starting to be installed on A-6E in 1979 during upgrades. The bombardier/navigator could use both TRAM imagery and radar data for extremely accurate attacks, and the radar has an Airborne Moving Target Indicator (AMTI), which allowed the aircraft to track a moving target (such as a tank or truck) and drop ordnance on it even though the target was moving.

== AN/APS-130 ==
AN/APS-130 is a derivative of AN/APQ-156 and the upgrade of AN/APQ-129, by applying the knowledge gained from AN/APQ-156 to improve AN/APQ-129. AN/APS-130 is fitted on EA-6B, enable the aircraft to fire AGM-88 HARM.

== AN/APS-146 ==
AN/APS-146 is a simplified version of AN/APQ-156/APS-130, with the interferometer omitted, but added a weather avoidance pencil beam, and replaced the reflector antenna with a planar antenna.

== AN/APQ-173 ==
AN/APQ-173 is the development of AN/APQ-156 with the addition to include synthetic aperture radar (SAR). and multi-function cockpit displays – the APQ-173 would have given the Intruder air-to-air capacity with provision for the AIM-120 AMRAAM. AN/APQ-173 was designed for A-6F/G which were cancelled.

== AN/APG-76 ==
AN/APG-76 is used in F-4E Kurnass 2000 (Israel) and has been tested in a pod configuration with the F-16 and S-3 Viking Gray Wolf Project. AN/APG-76 incorporates capability of AN/APQ-173 such as being compatible with AGM-88 and AIM-120, and it can also be configured as a side-looking radar. The side-looking version of AN/APG-76 played a very important role in the development of AN/APY-3 radar for Northrop Grumman E-8 Joint STARS in providing the foundation of know-hows for the development of the more advanced AN/APY-3.

== AN/APY-3 ==
AN/APY-3 is the radar developed for E-8 J-STARS. The 24-foot (7.3 meters) long, side-looking planar passive phased array radar is housed in the 27-foot (8 meters) long, canoe-shaped radome under the forward fuselage of the hosting aircraft. The radar and computer information systems on the E-8C gather and display detailed battlefield information on ground forces. The information is relayed in near-real time to the ground stations and to other ground command, control, communications, computers and intelligence, or C4I, nodes.

AN/APY-3 provides high-resolution synthetic aperture radar (SAR) images with moving target indicator (MTI) overlays to enable the operator to pick out targets in the images that were moving above some speed threshold. The SAR-MTI radar can be integrated with an INS or GPS to give the precise locations of targets, with the data relayed to other platforms over JTIDS.

The antenna of AN/APY-3 is tilted to either side of the aircraft where it has a 120-degree field of view covering nearly 19,305 square miles (50,000 square kilometers), and is capable of detecting targets at more than 250 kilometers (more than 820,000 feet). The radar also has some limited capability to detect helicopters, rotating antennas and low, slow-moving fixed wing aircraft. A total of 1000 ground targets can be simultaneously tracked by AN/APY-3.

== AN/APY-6 ==
The X-band AN/APY-6 is a derivative of AN/APY-3, and it is based on fiber-optic Ethernet LAN. The radar has SAR, inverse synthetic aperture radar (ISAR) and ground moving target indication (GMTI) modes. The resolution in strip SAR mode is 1.8 m (6 ft), while in SAR and ISAR mode, the best resolution is 0.35 m (1 ft). AN/APY-6 has a total of four parallel receivers, with one for GMTI, and three for various SAR/ISAR modes. The planar passive phased array antenna can be either point forward or abeam, with coverage of 200 degree arc, and a maximum range of 200 km. AN/APY-6 is designed for precision target striking, and an AESA version is currently under development.

== AN/APY-7 ==
AN/APY-7 is the development of AN/APY-3 as part of the Pave Mover program, and it is a solid state version of AN/APY-3 that adopts active electronically scanned array technology. AN/APY-7 radar can operate in fixed target indication (FTI), wide area surveillance, synthetic aperture radar (SAR), target classification and ground moving target indicator (GMTI) modes. An antenna is installed on the underside of the aircraft, which can be tilted for a 120 degree to either side of the plane to cover targets at more than 152 miles (250 km). The 7.3 m (24 ft) long, 0.6 m (2 ft) wide side-looking AESA antenna is housed in a 12 m (40 ft) canoe-shaped radome under the forward fuselage of the hosting aircraft along the center line. As with AN/APY-3, AN/APY-7 is electronically steered in azimuth by phase shifters, and mechanically in elevation by two servo motors.

== See also ==
- List of radars
- List of military electronics of the United States
