= 718th Bombardment Squadron =

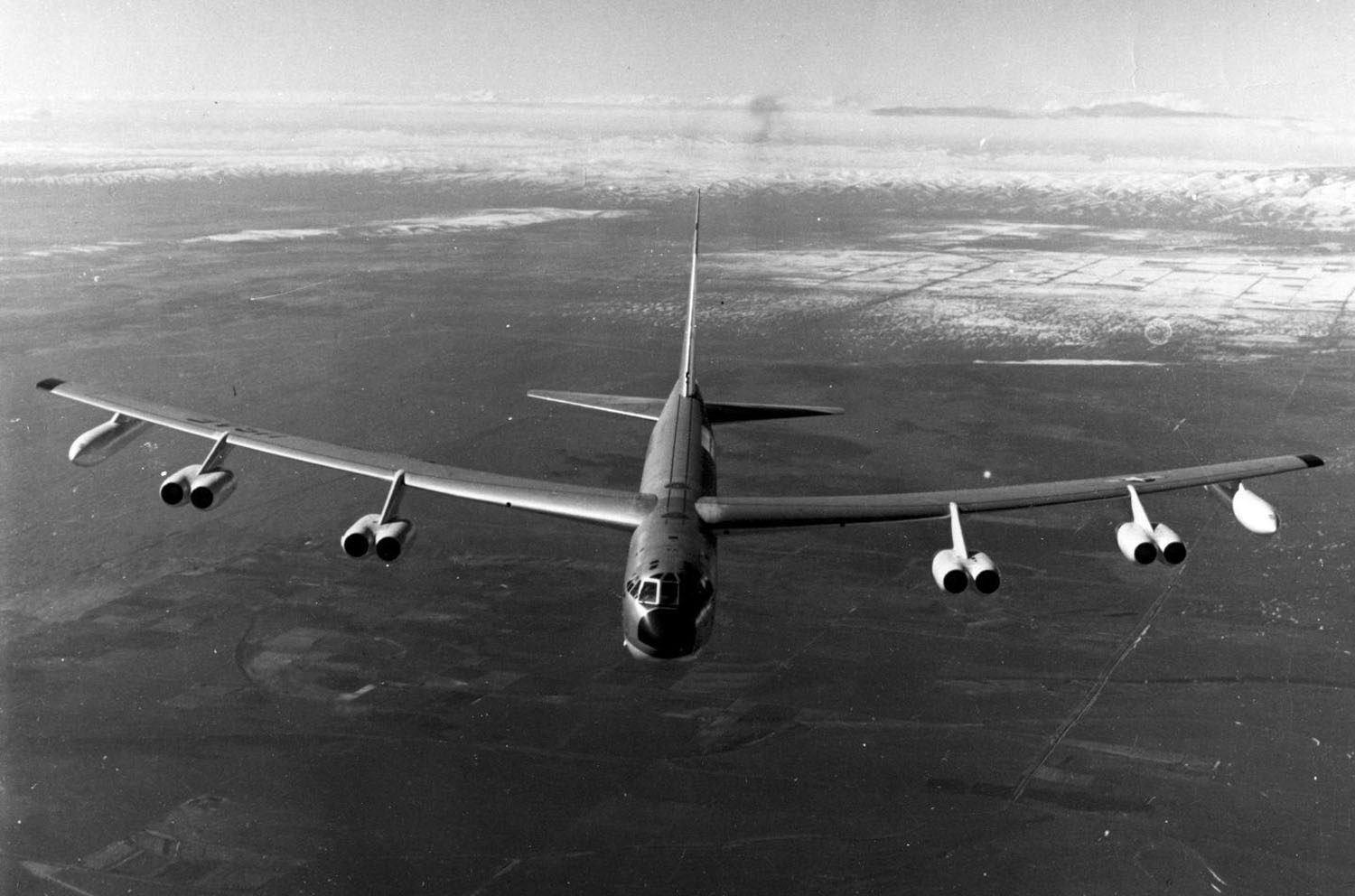
- B-52D Stratofortress as flown by the squadron
- Active: 1943–1963
- Role: Heavy bomber
- Engagements: Mediterranean Theater of Operations
- Decorations: Distinguished Unit Citation; Air Force Outstanding Unit Award

Insignia
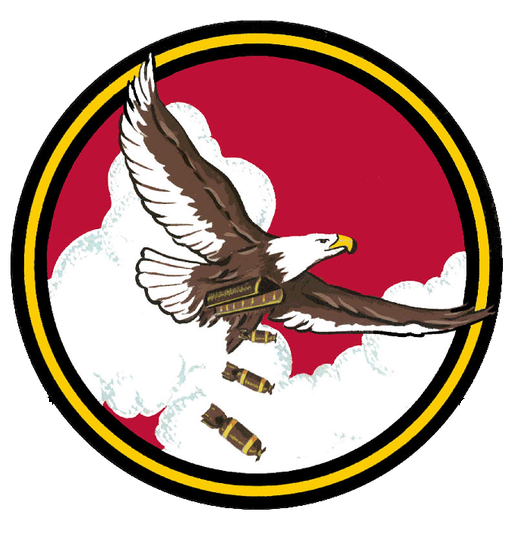
- 718 Bombardment Sq emblem (Note: Approved 21 March 1957. Description: Although not approved until 1957, this emblem had been used by the squadron since World War II. Watkins, pp. 92-93.)

The 718th Bombardment Squadron is an inactive United States Air Force unit. It was last assigned to the 4128th Strategic Wing at Amarillo Air Force Base, Texas, where it was inactivated on 1 February 1963.

The squadron was first activated in May 1943. After training in the United States, the squadron deployed to the Mediterranean Theater of Operations, where it participated in the strategic bombing campaign against Germany. The squadron was awarded two Distinguished Unit Citations for its actions during the war. Following V-E Day, the 718th returned to the United States and trained with Boeing B-29 Superfortresses, becoming one of the first bomber units in Strategic Air Command (SAC). The squadron deployed to Alaska from 1946 through 1947, then returned to Ellsworth Air Force Base, South Dakota, where it served as a heavy bomber and strategic reconnaissance unit until it moved to Amarillo Air Force Base, Texas as part of SAC's program to disperse its Boeing B-52 Stratofortress force to make it less vulnerable to Soviet attack.

== History ==
=== World War II ===
The squadron was first activated in May 1943 at Davis-Monthan Field, Arizona as one of the four original squadrons of the 449th Bombardment Group. It trained with Consolidated B-24 Liberators at Alamogordo Army Air Field, New Mexico and Bruning Army Air Field, Nebraska before departing for the Mediterranean Theater of Operations in November 1943.

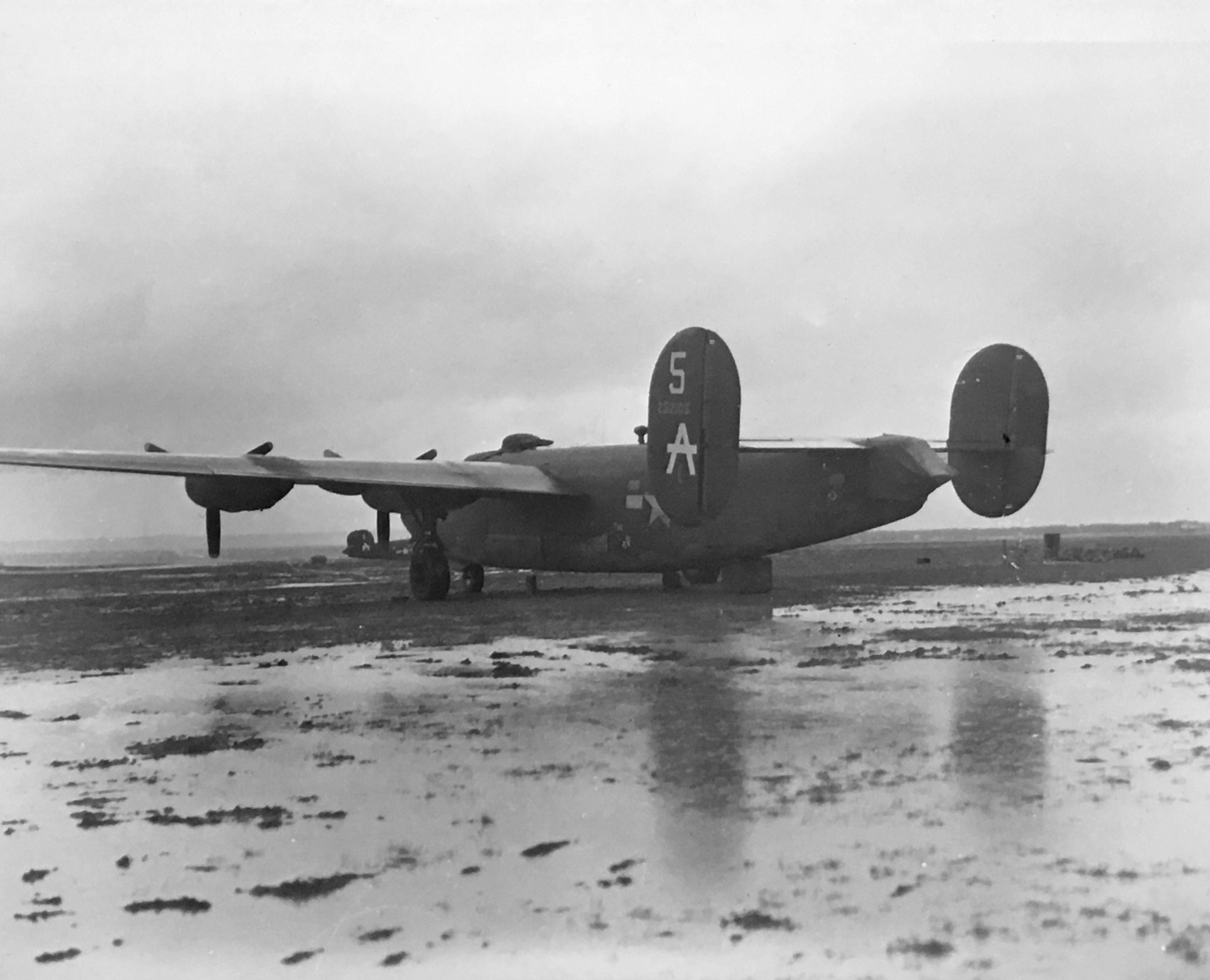
449th Group B-24 in Italy

The squadron assembled at its combat station, Grottaglie Airfield in Southern Italy, in early January 1944, from which it operated primarily on strategic bombing missions. It attacked oil refineries, communications centers, aircraft factories and industrial facilities in Italy, Germany, Czechoslovakia, Hungary, Romania, Albania and Greece. The squadron was awarded a Distinguished Unit Citation (DUC) for its actions on 4 April 1944, when the squadron, along with the other elements of the 449th Group operated without fighter escort in an attack on railroad marshalling yards near Bucharest. The attacking group was heavily outnumbered by German interceptor aircraft, but not only succeeded in destroying its assigned target, but inflicted heavy losses on the defending fighters. It was awarded a second DUC for an attack against oil refineries near Ploesti, attacking through heavy smoke that obscured the target area and despite intense enemy fire.

The squadron attacked gun emplacements to support Operation Dragoon, the invasion of southern France in August 1944. It attacked troop concentrations, bridges and viaducts during Operation Grapeshot, the Fifteenth Army Group offensive in Northern Italy in the spring of 1945. Shortly after V-E Day, in May 1945, the squadron returned to the United States.

The squadron reformed at Sioux Falls Army Air Field, South Dakota at the end of May. The squadron began training with Boeing B-29 Superfortress very heavy bombers. After V-J Day and the end of the War in the Pacific, the squadron moved to Grand Island Army Air Field, Nebraska, where it became one of the first bomber units of Strategic Air Command (SAC) in March 1946. In August 1946, the 28th Bombardment Group replaced the 449th Group at Grand Island, and the squadron transferred to the 28th Group, which had previously been a composite group.

=== Cold War ===
The squadron deployed to Alaska in October 1946. Its Arctic stay was brief, and it returned to the United States and its new station at Rapid City Army Air Field, South Dakota in April 1947. In 1949, the squadron began converting to the long range Convair B-36 Peacemaker. Its mission changed to reconnaissance the following year, and it received reconnaissance models of the Superfortress (briefly) and the Peacemaker, becoming the 718th Strategic Reconnaissance Squadron. SAC’s mobilization for the Korean War highlighted that SAC wing commanders focused too much on running the base organization and not spending enough time on overseeing actual combat preparations. Under a plan implemented in February 1951 and finalized in June 1952, the squadron reported directly to the 28th Strategic Reconnaissance Wing and the intermediate group was eliminated.

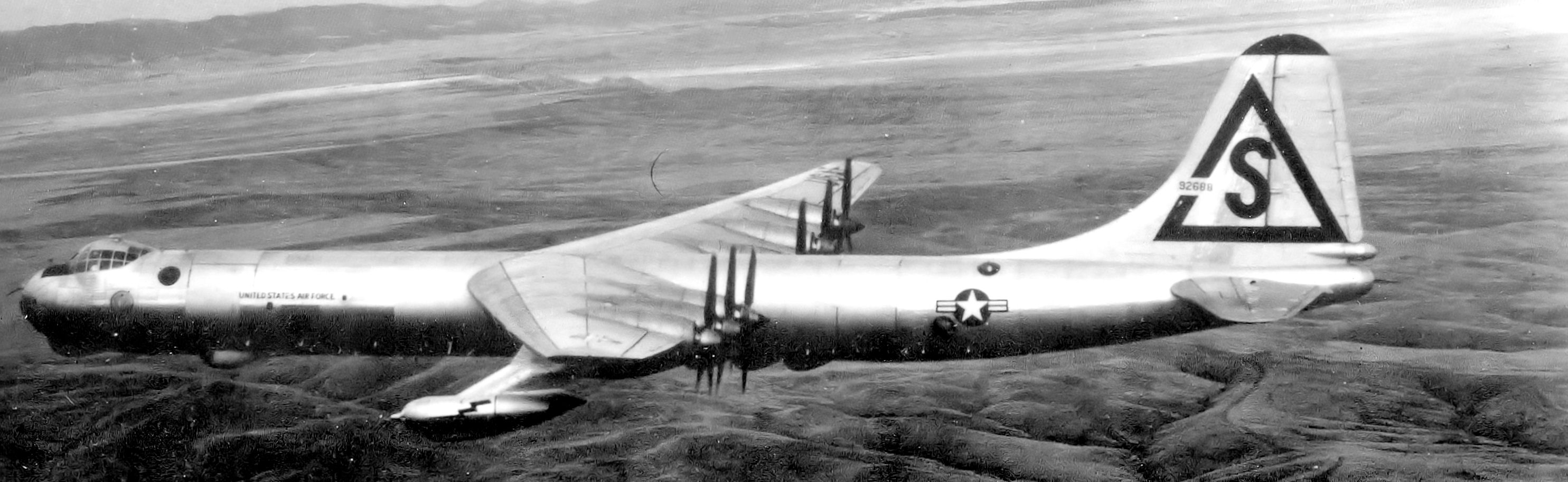
28th Strategic Reconnaissance Wing RB-36D (Note: Aircraft is Convair RB-36D-10-CF Peacemaker, serial 49-2688. This plane was modified to Featherweight II configuration. It was sent to the Military Aircraft Storage and Disposition Center on 14 September 1956 and scrapped. Baugher, Joe (23 May 2023). "1949 USAF Serial Numbers". Joe Baugher.)

On 16 June 1954 the squadron, along with SAC's other B-36 reconnaissance units, was assigned bombing as its primary mission. However, it retained its designation as a reconnaissance unit until October 1955, when it again became the 718th Bombardment Squadron. The squadron retained its reconnaissance capability until September 1956. From April to June 1955, the unit deployed to Andersen Air Force Base, Guam.

In 1957, the squadron began to replace its piston engine B-36s with Boeing B-52D Stratofortess jet bombers. However, SAC bases like Ellsworth Air Force Base (the new name of the base at Rapid City), with large concentrations of bombers made attractive targets. SAC’s response was to break up its wings and scatter their aircraft over a larger number of bases, thus making it more difficult for the Soviet Union to knock out the entire fleet with a surprise first strike. As this program was implemented, the 718th moved to Amarillo Air Force Base, Texas, where it was assigned to the 4245th Strategic Wing.

Starting in 1960, one third of the squadron's aircraft were maintained on fifteen minute alert, fully fueled and ready for combat to reduce vulnerability to a Soviet missile strike. This was increased to half the squadron's aircraft in 1962. During the Cuban Missile Crisis, starting on 20 October, the squadron was directed to put two additional planes on alert and on 24 October SAC went to DEFCON 2, placing all aircraft on alert. In addition, 1/8 of SAC's B-52s were placed on airborne alert. On 21 November SAC returned to normal airborne alert posture.

The squadron's parent 4245th Strategic Wing was a Major Command controlled (MAJCON) wing. MAJCON units could not carry a permanent history or lineage, so SAC received authority from Headquarters USAF to discontinue its MAJCON strategic wings that were equipped with combat aircraft and to activate Air Force controlled (AFCON) units, most of which were inactive at the time but could carry a lineage and history. SAC activated the 494th Bombardment Wing at Sheppard to replace the 4245th and the 718th was inactivated on 1 February 1963, with its mission, personnel and equipment transferred to the 764th Bombardment Squadron, which was simultaneously activated.

== Lineage ==
- Constituted as the 718th Bombardment Squadron (Heavy) on 6 April 1943

Activated on 1 May 1943
Redesignated 718th Bombardment Squadron, Heavy c.1944
Redesignated 718th Bombardment Squadron, Very Heavy on 23 May 1945
Redesignated 718th Bombardment Squadron, Medium on 28 May 1948
Redesignated 718th Bombardment Squadron, Heavy on 16 May 1949
Redesignated 718th Strategic Reconnaissance Squadron (Photographic) on 1 April 1950
Redesignated 718th Strategic Reconnaissance Squadron, Heavy on 16 July 1950
Redesignated 718th Bombardment Squadron, Heavy on 1 October 1955
Discontinued and inactivated on 1 February 1963

=== Assignments ===
- 449th Bombardment Group, 1 May 1943
- 28th Bombardment Group (later 28th Strategic Reconnaissance) Group), 4 August 1946 (attached to 28th Strategic Reconnaissance Wing after 10 February 1951)
- 28th Strategic Reconnaissance Wing (later 28th Bombardment Wing), 16 June 1952
- 4128th Strategic Wing, 20 February 1960 – 1 February 1963.

=== Stations ===
- Davis-Monthan Field, Arizona, 1 May 1943
- Alamogordo Army Air Field, New Mexico, 5 July 1943
- Bruning Army Air Field, Nebraska, 12 September–26 November 1943
- Grottaglie Airfield, Italy, c. 6 January 1944 – 15 May 1945
- Sioux Falls Army Air Field, South Dakota, 29 May 1945
- Dalhart Army Air Field, Texas, 24 July 1945
- Grand Island Army Air Field, Nebraska, 8 September 1945 – 6 October 1946
- Elmendorf Field, Alaska Territory, 20 October 1946 – 24 April 1947
- Rapid City Army Air Field (later Rapid City Air Force Base, Ellsworth Air Force Base), South Dakota, 3 May 1947
- Amarillo Air Force Base, Texas, 20 February 1960 – 1 February 1963

=== Aircraft ===
- Consolidated B-24 Liberator, 1943–1945
- Boeing B-17 Flying Fortress, 1945
- Boeing B-29 Superfortess, 1946–1950
- Boeing RB-29 Superfortress, 1950
- Convair B-36 Peacemaker, 1949–1950
- Convair RB-36 Peacemaker, 1950–1957
- Boeing B-52D Stratofortess, 1957–1963

=== Awards and campaigns ===
Award streamer	Award	Dates	Notes
	Distinguished Unit Citation	4 April 1944	Bucharest, Rumania 718th Bombardment Squadron
	Distinguished Unit Citation	9 July 1944	Ploesti, Rumania 718th Bombardment Squadron
	Air Force Outstanding Unit Award	1 September 1957 – 30 June 1958	718th Bombardment Squadron
	Air Force Outstanding Unit Award	1 March 1960 – 30 June 1961	718th Bombardment Squadron

Campaign Streamer	Campaign	Dates	Notes
	American Theater without inscription	1 May 1943 – 26 November 1943	718th Bombardment Squadron
	Air Offensive, Europe	c. 6 January 1944 – 5 June 1944	718th Bombardment Squadron
	Naples-Foggia	c. 6 January 1944 – 21 January 1944	718th Bombardment Squadron
	Air Combat, EAME Theater	c. 6 January 1944 – 11 May 1945	718th Bombardment Squadron
	Anzio	22 January 1944 – 24 May 1944	718th Bombardment Squadron
	Rome-Arno	22 January 1944 – 9 September 1944	718th Bombardment Squadron
	Central Europe	22 March 1944 – 21 May 1945	718th Bombardment Squadron
	Normandy	6 June 1944 – 24 July 1944	718th Bombardment Squadron
	Northern France	25 July 1944 – 14 September 1944	718th Bombardment Squadron
	Southern France	15 August 1944 – 14 September 1944	718th Bombardment Squadron
	North Apennines	10 September 1944 – 4 April 1945	718th Bombardment Squadron
	Rhineland	15 September 1944 – 21 March 1945	718th Bombardment Squadron
	Po Valley	3 April 1945 – 8 May 1945	718th Bombardment Squadron

== See also ==
- List of B-52 Units of the United States Air Force
- List of B-29 Superfortress operators
- List of B-52 Units of the United States Air Force
