= 461st Air Control Wing =

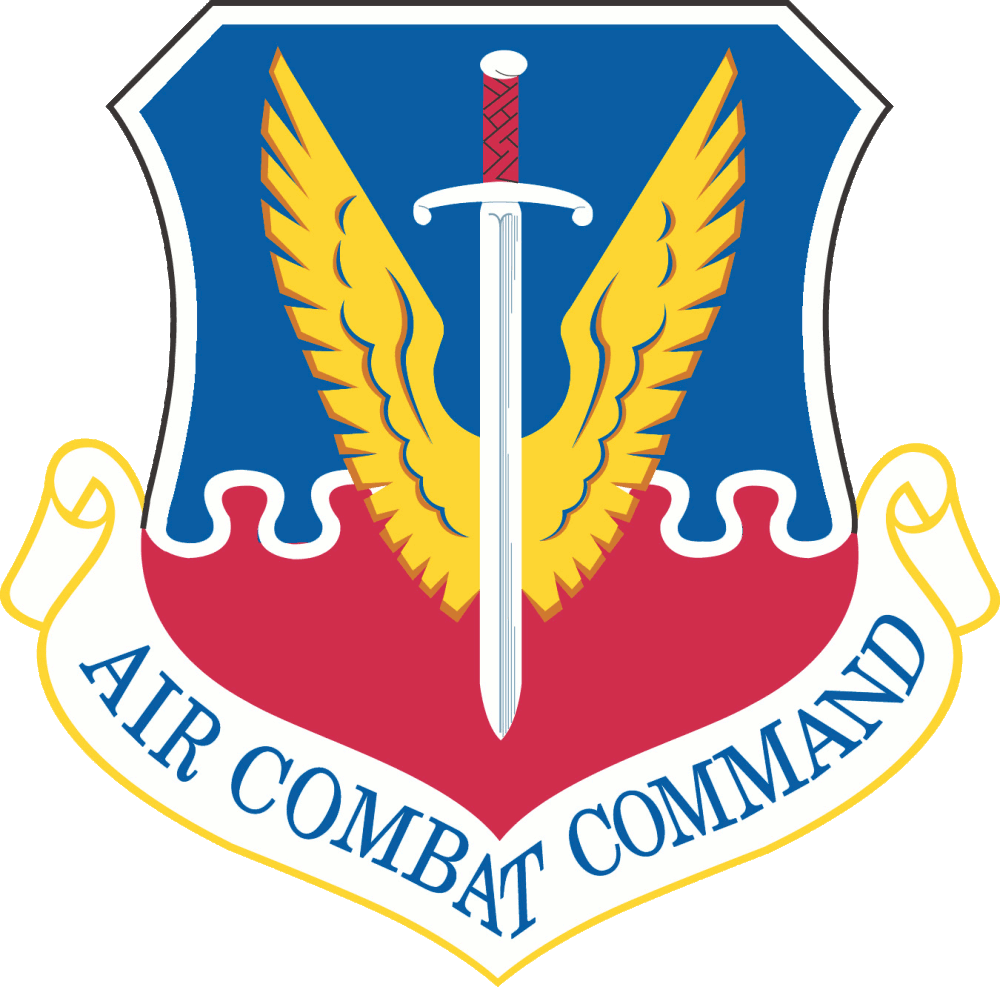
461st Air Control Wing

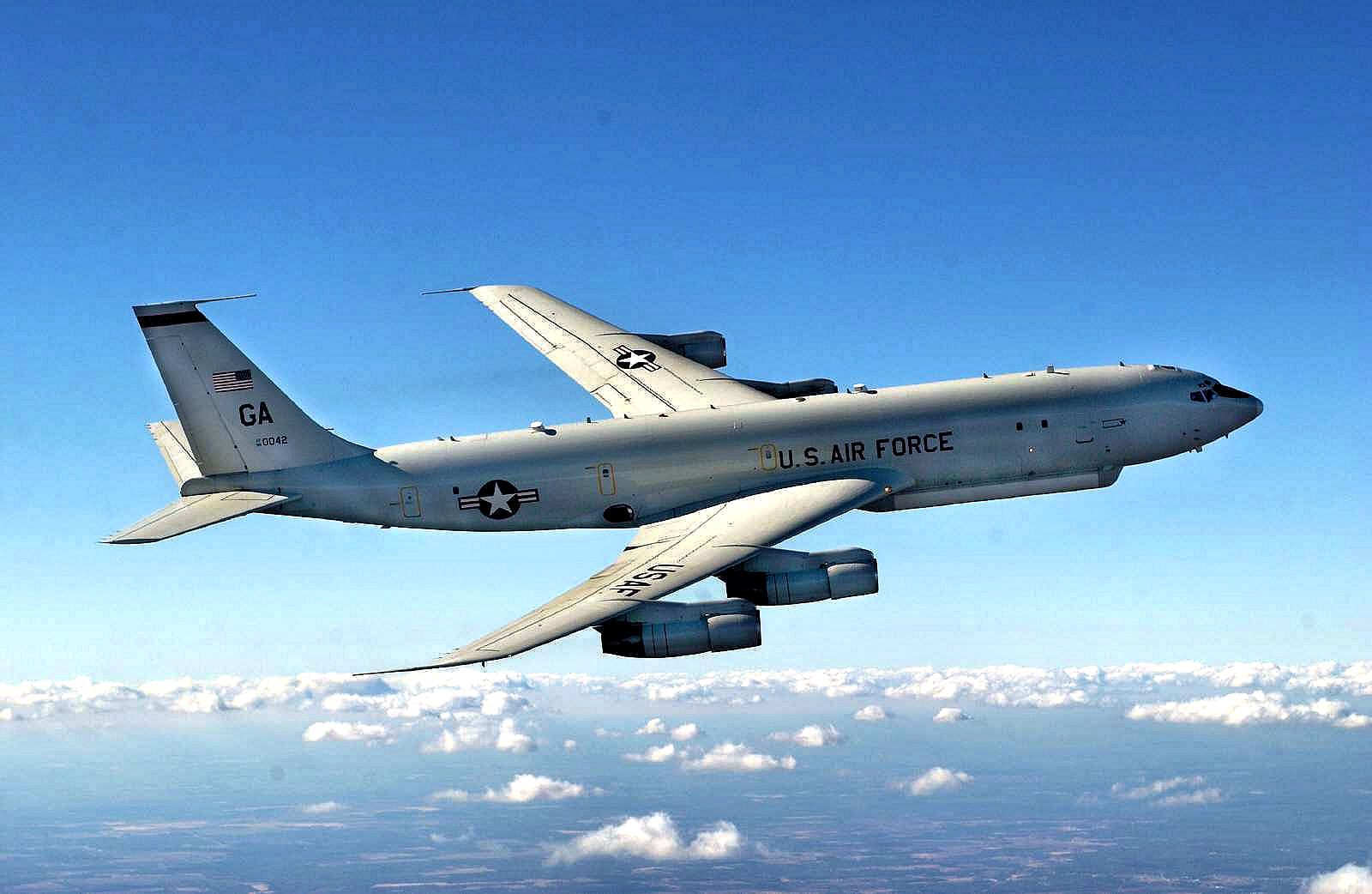
- E-8C Joint STARS 96-0042
- Active: 1953–1958, 1963–1968, 2011–present
- Country: United States
- Branch: United States Air Force
- Role: Air Control
- Part of: Air Combat Command
- Garrison/HQ: Robins Air Force Base, Georgia
- Decorations: Air Force Meritorious Unit Award; Air Force Outstanding Unit Award

Insignia
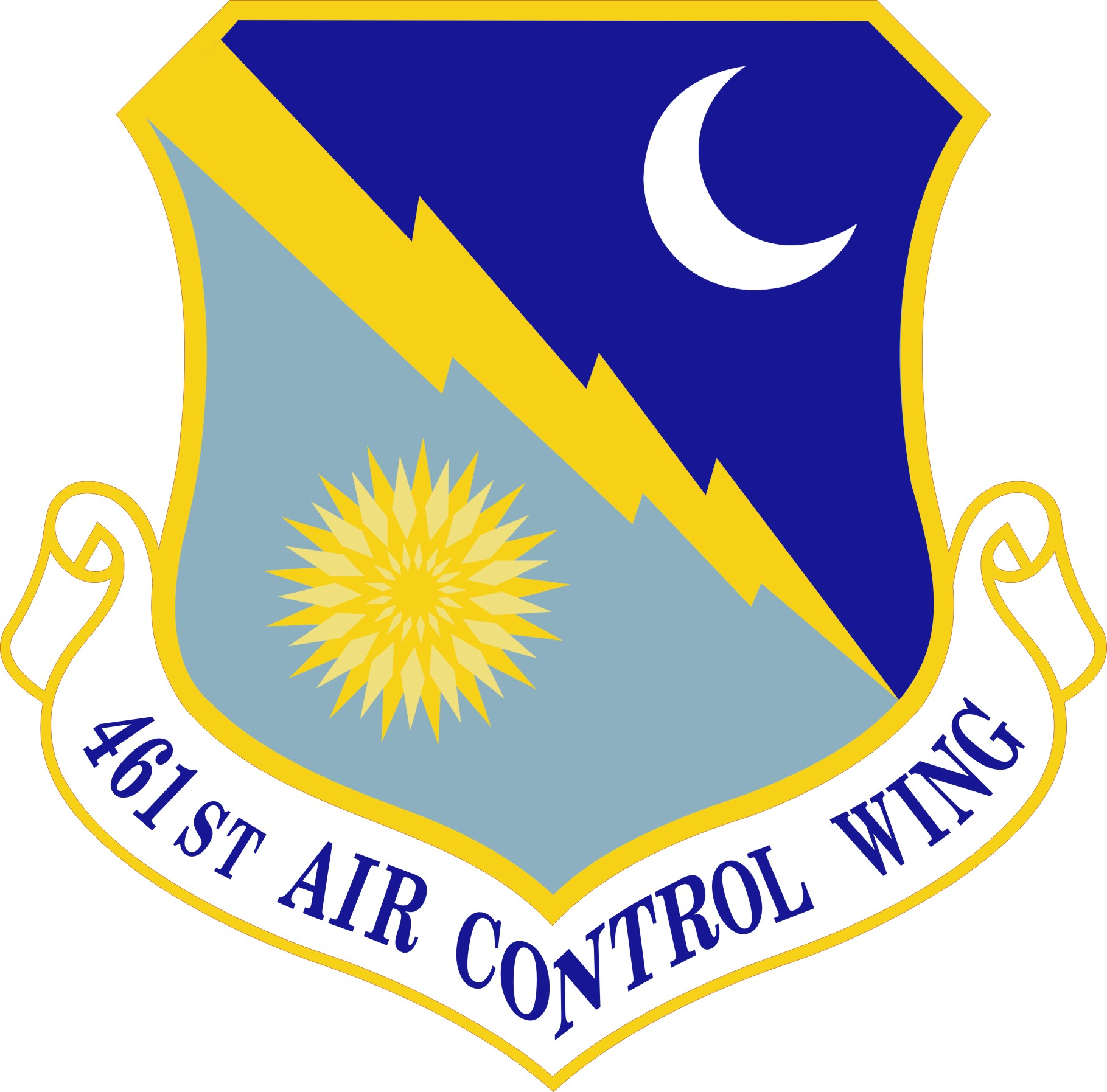
- 461st Air Control Wing emblem (Note: Approved 3 November 2011.)

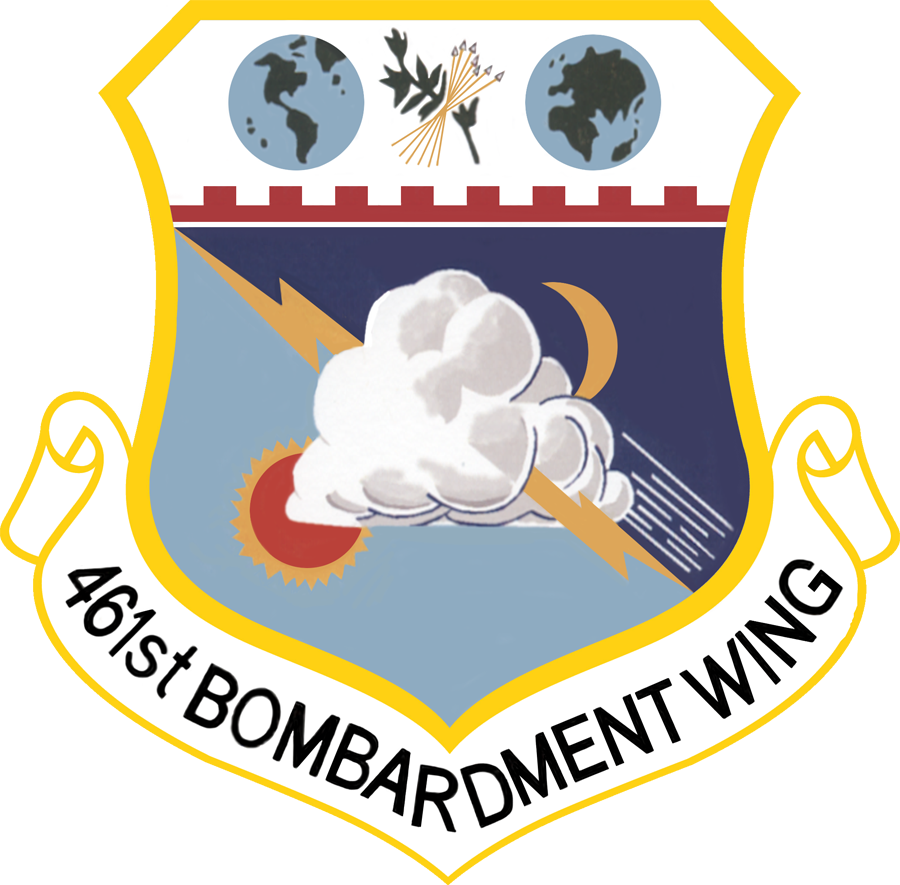
- 461st Bombardment Wing emblem (Note: Approved 5 August 1955.)

The 461st Air Control Wing is an air battle management wing of the United States Air Force. It is assigned to Air Combat Command's Fifteenth Air Force, and is stationed at Robins Air Force Base, Georgia. It was activated on 1 October 2011.

Until 2023, it was a joint Air Force/Army unit flying the E-8 J-STARS aircraft. Originally activated as a bomber wing by Tactical Air Command (TAC) in the 1950s, it flew Douglas B-26 Invaders while waiting for delivery of its Martin B-57 Canberras. It was inactivated in 1958, when TAC transferred Blytheville Air Force Base, Arkansas to Strategic Air Command (SAC). The wing was organized as a strategic wing by SAC at Amarillo Air Force Base, Texas in 1963. The wing flew Boeing B-52 Stratofortress heavy strategic bombers and Boeing KC-135 Stratotanker heavy air refueling aircraft. It deployed aircraft and crews to Andersen Air Force Base, Guam for combat operations in Southeast Asia. The wing was inactivated in March 1968 with the retirement of older model B-52s and the impending closure of Amarillo.

== Units ==
- Headquarters 461st Air Control Wing
  - 461st Operations Group
    - 12th Airborne Command and Control Squadron (inactivated April 12, 2024)
    - 16th Airborne Command and Control Squadron (inactivated 2023)
    - 330th Combat Training Squadron
  - 461st Maintenance Group
    - 461st Maintenance Squadron (461 MXS)

== History ==
=== Tactical Air Command ===
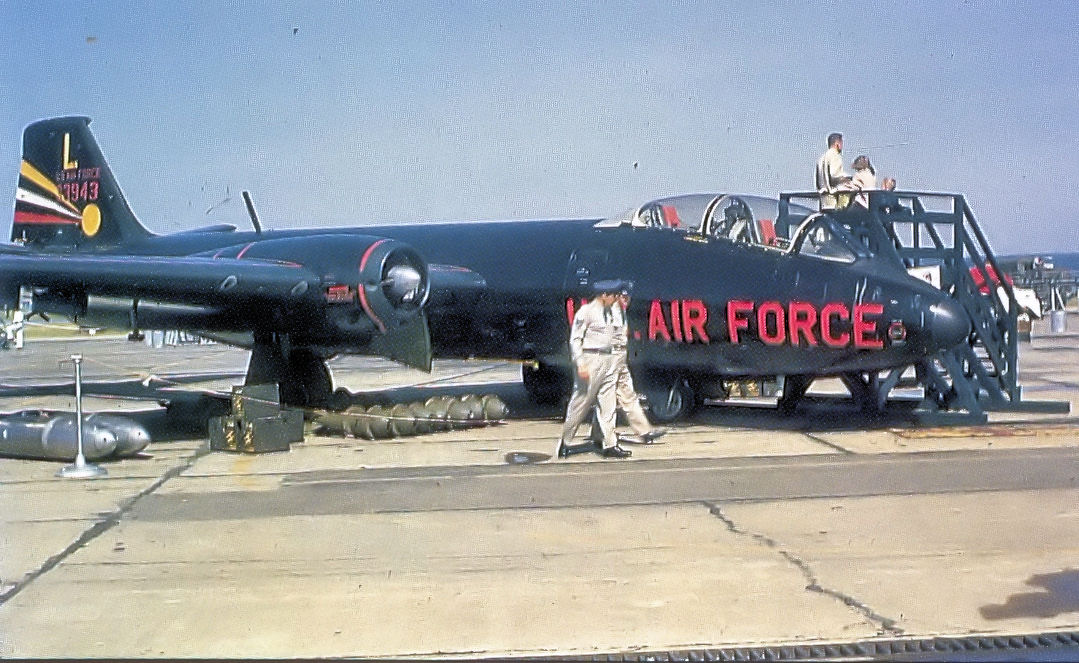
461st Bombardment Wing B-57 Canberra (Note: Aircraft is Martin B-57B-MA Canberra, serial 53-3934, taken in 1956.)

Prompted by experience in the Korean War, the Air Force decided to increase its air support and air interdiction capabilities to support ground forces. As part of this increase, it organized the 461st Bombardment Wing at Hill Air Force Base, Utah, in December 1953. The wing was intended to be a Martin B-57 Canberra unit, but these aircraft were not available, so it was initially equipped with Douglas B-26 Invaders. Officer cadre for the squadron was drawn from 4th Tow Target Squadron at George Air Force Base, California. Facilities at Hill required development and combat readiness training did not begin until July 1954.

The wing trained in light bomber operations and participated in exercises, including simulated deployments. On 5 January 1955 the wing received its first B-57B, and was fully equipped by the end of the year. However, Hill's parking and hangar space was inadequate for the B-57s and even as they began to arrive, the unit anticipated a move to Blytheville Air Force Base, Arkansas, which was being developed by the Corps of Engineers for reopening in 1955. The wing's first operational squadron moved from Hill to Blytheville in October 1955. Its last squadron was in place on 1 March 1956, and it was joined by wing headquarters and support units in April.

The conversion to the Canberra brought a number of changes. The new aircraft was subject to several periods of grounding (the wing suffered four major accidents while converting to the Canberra), and faced shortfalls in the number of aircrew available. The wing's mission also underwent changes, with the delivery of tactical nuclear weapons taking priority over conventional weapons delivery, although conventional weapons remained as a secondary mission. The wing's operational squadrons and group inactivated in January 1958 as Tactical Air Command, under budget pressures, prepared to transfer Blytheville to Strategic Air Command (SAC). Wing headquarters and support elements inactivated on 1 April 1958, turning the base over to SAC's 4229th Air Base Squadron.

=== Strategic Air Command ===
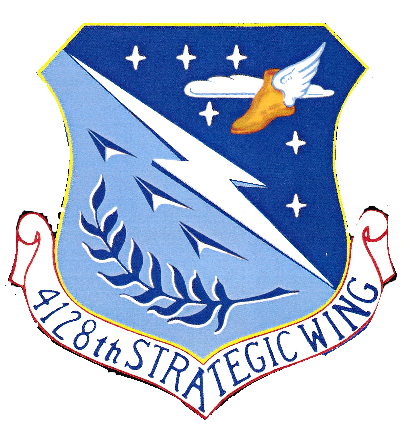
4128th Strategic Wing emblem

==== 4128th Strategic Wing ====
On 5 January 1959, SAC established the 4128th Strategic Wing at Amarillo Air Force Base, Texas and assigned it to the 47th Air Division as part of SAC's plan to disperse its Boeing B-52 Stratofortress heavy bombers over a larger number of bases, thus making it more difficult for the Soviet Union to knock out the entire fleet with a surprise first strike. The wing initially comprised three maintenance squadrons and a squadron to provide security for special weapons. On 1 July, the 58th Aviation Depot Squadron was activated to oversee the wing's special weapons and the wing was transferred to the 810th Air Division.

The wing became operational on 1 February 1960 when the 718th Bombardment Squadron, consisting of 15 B-52s moved to Amarillo from Ellsworth Air Force Base, South Dakota where it had been one of the three squadrons of the 28th Bombardment Wing. One third of the wing's aircraft were maintained on fifteen-minute alert, fully fueled, armed, and ready for combat. In 1962, this was increased to half the wing's aircraft. The 4128th (and later the 461st) continued to maintain an alert commitment until inactivated, except for periods when the wing's aircraft were deployed. On 1 July 1962 the 4128th Wing was reassigned to the 22d Air Division.

Soon after detection of Soviet missiles in Cuba, On 20 October 1962, the 4128th Wing was directed to put two additional bombers on alert. Two days later 1/8 of SAC's B-52s were placed on airborne alert. On 24 October SAC went to DEFCON 2, placing all its combat aircraft on alert. On 21 November tensions from the Cuban Missile Crisis had eased, and SAC returned to normal airborne alert posture. Meanshile, because SAC Strategic Wings could not carry a permanent history or lineage SAC looked for a way to make its Strategic Wings permanent.

==== 461st Bombardment Wing ====
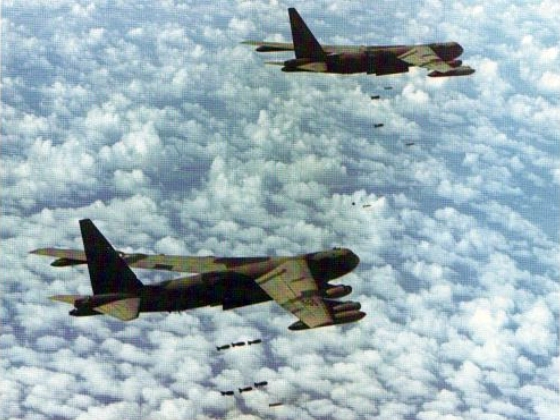
B-52 Stratofortresses on a mission in Southeast Asia

In 1962, in order to perpetuate the lineage of many currently inactive bombardment units with illustrious World War II records, Headquarters SAC received authority from Headquarters USAF to discontinue its Major Command controlled (MAJCON) strategic wings that were equipped with combat aircraft and to activate Air Force controlled (AFCON) units, most of which were inactive at the time, but which could carry a lineage and history. As a result, the 4128th was replaced by the reactivated 461st Bombardment Wing, Heavy, which assumed its mission, personnel, and equipment on 1 February 1963. (Note: The 461st Wing also continued, through temporary bestowal, the history, and honors of the World War II 461st Bombardment Group. It was also entitled to retain the honors (but not the history or lineage) of the 4128th Strategic Wing.)

In the same way the 764th Bombardment Squadron, one of the unit's World War II historical bomb squadrons, replaced the 718th Bombardment Squadron. Under the Dual Deputate organization, (Note: Under this plan flying squadrons reported to the wing Deputy Commander for Operations and maintenance squadrons reported to the wing Deputy Commander for Maintenance.) all flying and maintenance squadrons were directly assigned to the wing, so no operational group element was activated. The 58th Munitions Maintenance Squadron was reassigned to the 461st, while The 4128th's other maintenance and security squadrons were replaced by ones with the 461st numerical designation of the new wing. Each of the new units assumed the personnel, equipment, and mission of its predecessor.

In April 1963, the wing gained an air refueling capability for its bombers when the 909th Air Refueling Squadron was activated with KC-135 tankers. The 909th remained with the wing until June 1966, when it moved to March Air Force Base, California and was reassigned. The wing trained with B-52s, maintained heavy bombardment proficiency and participated in numerous operational readiness inspections and military exercises.

In January 1967, the wing deployed its aircraft and crews to Anderson Air Force Base, Guam, where they carried out missions in Southeast Asia as part of a provisional bombardment wing participating in Operation Arc Light. The wing's planes and personnel returned to Amarillo in July, where they returned to nuclear alert. However, "[i]n December 1965, a few months after the first B-52Bs started leaving the operational inventory, Robert S. McNamara, Secretary of Defense [announced] another phaseout program that would further reduce SAC's bomber force. Basically, this program called for the mid-1971 retirement of all B-52Cs and of several subsequent B-52 models." In addition, in January 1968, announcement was made that Amarillo would close at the end of the year. The wing's last operational B-52 was transferred to another unit on 21 January 1968, and the wing inactivated on 25 March.

=== Air Combat Command ===
The 116th Air Control Wing of the Georgia Air National Guard operated as a composite E-8 Joint STARS ground surveillance and battle management unit, with both Guardsmen and regulars assigned to the same unit. Joint STARS detected, located, classified, tracked and targeted ground movements on the battlefield, communicating real-time information through secure data links. But the composite Guard/regular arrangement proved to be problematic in areas such as military justice jurisdiction, and in other areas. The Air Force separated the regular and guard units in 2011. The wing was redesignated as the 461st Air Control Wing and activated in October 2011 when the regular Air Force assumed associate responsibility to the 116th Air Control Wing for the JSTARS mission.

Until the aircraft was retired in 2023, the 461st Air Control Wing was the only active duty Air Force wing operating the E-8C Joint Surveillance Target Attack Radar System (Joint STARS).

== Lineage ==
- Constituted as the 461st Bombardment Wing, Light on 11 December 1953

Activated on 23 December 1953
Redesignated 461st Bombardment Wing, Tactical on 1 October 1955
Inactivated on 1 April 1958

- Redesignated 461st Bombardment Wing, Heavy and activated on 15 November 1962 (not organized)

Activated on 15 November 1962
Organized on 1 February 1963
Discontinued and inactivated on 25 March 1968

- Redesignated 461st Air Control Wing on 1 September 2011

Activated on 1 October 2011

=== Assignments ===
- Ninth Air Force, 23 December 1953 – 1 April 1958 (attached to Nineteenth Air Force 15 April 1956 – 1 April 1958)
- Strategic Air Command, 15 November 1962 (not organized)
- 22d Strategic Aerospace Division, 1 February 1963
- 819th Strategic Aerospace Division, 1 July 1964
- Second Air Force, 1 July 1965
- 19th Air Division, 2 July 1966 – 25 March 1968
- Ninth Air Force, 7 October 2011 – present

=== Components ===
==== Groups ====
- 461st Bombardment Group (later 461st Operations Group), 23 December 1953 – 8 January 1958, 1 October 2011 – present
- 461st Maintenance & Supply Group (later 461st Maintenance Group), 23 December 1953 – 8 January 1958, 1 October 2011 – present
- 461st Air Base Group, 23 December 1953 – 1 April 1958

==== Squadrons ====
Operational Squadrons

- 764th Bombardment Squadron, 1 February 1963 – 25 March 1968
- 909th Air Refueling Squadron, 1 April 1963 – 25 June 1966

Maintenance Squadrons

- 58th Munitions Maintenance Squadron, 1 February 1963 – 25 March 1968
- 461st Armament & Electronics Maintenance Squadron, 1 February 1963 – 25 March 1968
- 461st Combat Defense Squadron (later 461st Security Police Squadron), 1 February 1963 – 25 March 1968
- 461st Field Maintenance Squadron, 1 February 1963 – 25 March 1968
- 461st Organizational Maintenance Squadron, 1 February 1963 – 25 March 1968

Other units

- 461st Tactical Infirmary (later 461st Tactical Hospital), 8 April 1956 – 1 April 1958
- 4463d USAF Infirmary, 8 April 1956 – 1 April 1958

=== Stations ===
- Hill Air Force Base, Utah, 23 December 1953 – 8 April 1956
- Blytheville Air Force Base, Arkansas, 8 April 1956 – 1 April 1958
- Amarillo Air Force Base, Texas, 1 February 1963 – 28 March 1968
- Robins Air Force Base, Georgia, 7 October 2011 – present

=== Aircraft ===
- Douglas B-26 Invader, 1953–1956
- Douglas C-47 Skytrain, 1954–1956
- Martin B-57 Canberra, 1955–1958
- Boeing B-52 Stratofortress, 1963–1968
- Boeing KC-135 Stratotanker, 1963–1966
- E-8C Joint STARS, 2011–2023

=== Awards and campaigns ===
Award streamer	Award	Dates	Notes
	Air Force Meritorious Unit Award	1 October 2011–31 March 2012	461st Air Control Wing
	Air Force Meritorious Unit Award	1 April 2012–31 May 2013	461st Air Control Wing
	Air Force Meritorious Unit Award	1 June 2014–31 May 2015	461st Air Control Wing
	Air Force Meritorious Unit Award	1 June 2015–31 May 2016	461st Air Control Wing
	Air Force Meritorious Unit Award	1 June 2016–31 May 2017	461st Air Control Wing
	Air Force Outstanding Unit Award	1 July 1966-30 June 1967	461st Bombardment Wing
	Air Force Outstanding Unit Award	1 June 2013–31 May 2014	461st Air Control Wing

(Note: The wing is also entitled to display, through temporary bestowal, the two Distinguished Unit Citations earned by the 461st Operations Group. Haulman, AFHRA factsheet.)

Campaign Streamer	Campaign	Dates	Notes
	Global War on Terror Service Medal	1 October 2011–	461st Air Control Wing

(Note: The wing is also entitled to display, through temporary bestowal, the campaign streamers earned by the 461st Operations Group. Haulman, AFHRA factsheet.)

== See also ==
- B-24 Liberator units of the United States Army Air Forces
- List of B-52 Units of the United States Air Force
- List of B-57 units of the United States Air Force
- List of Douglas A-26 Invader operators
- List of Douglas C-47 Skytrain operators
- List of USAF Bomb Wings and Wings assigned to Strategic Air Command
- List of USAF Strategic Wings assigned to the Strategic Air Command
