= 22nd Strategic Aerospace Division =

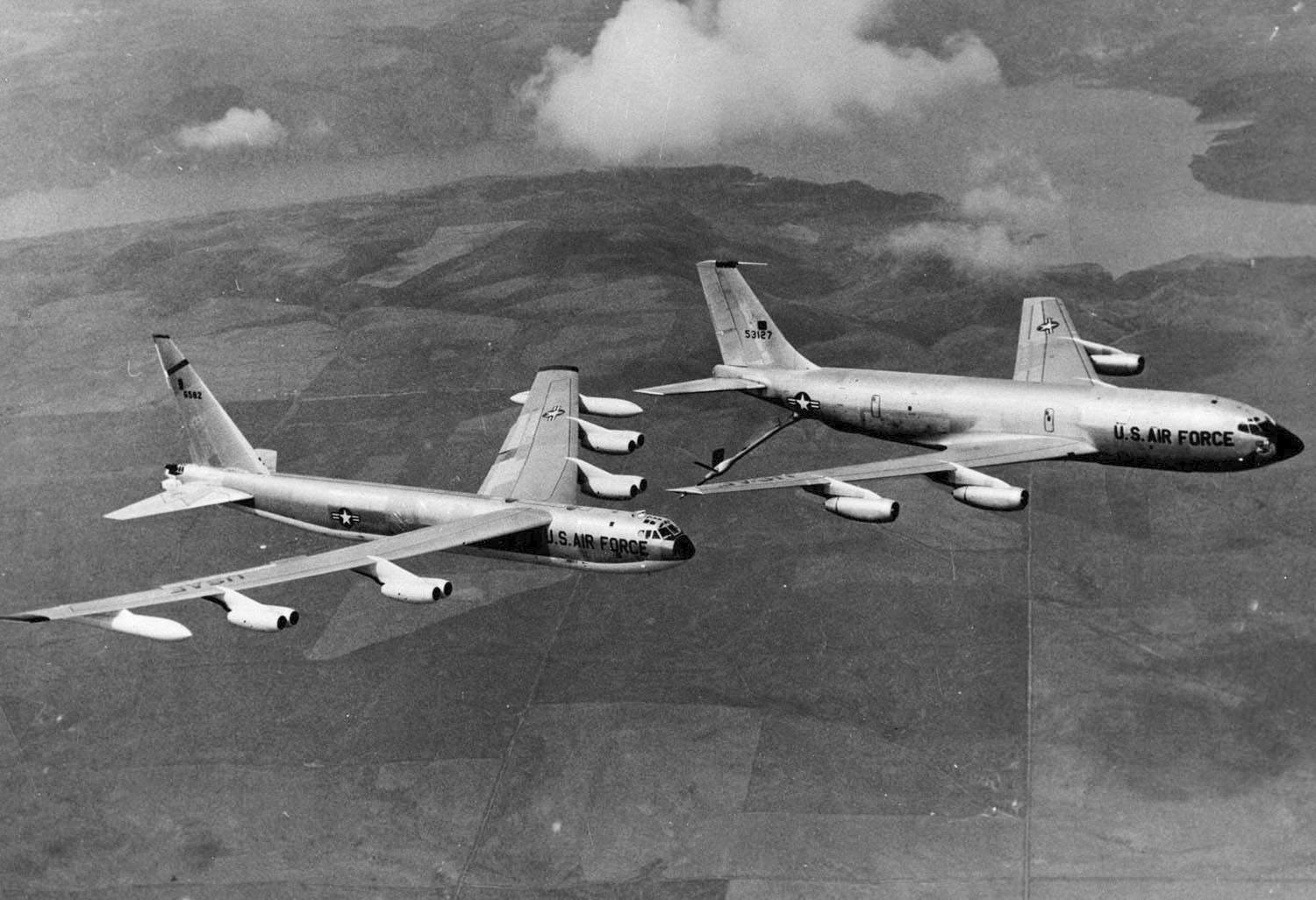
- B-52 and KC-135, which were assigned to the division from 1963 to 1965
- Active: 1942–1943; 1959–1965
- Country: United States
- Branch: United States Air Force
- Role: Command of strategic strike forces

Insignia
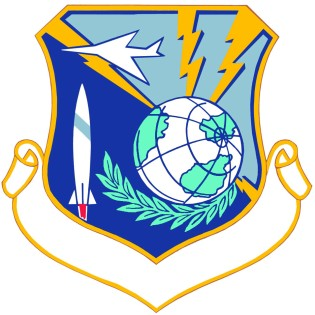
- 22nd Strategic Aerospace Division emblem (Note: Approved 6 June 1963. Description: Per bend light blue and azure four lightning flashes, two in bend issuant from dexter chief and sinister base, two issuant from sinister chief all or garnished gules, overall in dexter chief an aircraft fesswise argent in dexter flank a missile palewise of the like [color] emitting a vapor trail to base of the fourth [color mentioned] fimbriated of the fifth [color mentioned], in sinister base a globe arraswise of the last [color mentioned] grid lined of the second [color mentioned] with land areas vert above an arched olive branch of the last [color mentioned], all within a diminished bordure of the third [color mentioned.)

The 22nd Strategic Aerospace Division is an inactive United States Air Force unit. Its last assignment was with the Fifteenth Air Force, stationed at Walker Air Force Base, New Mexico. It was inactivated on 1 July 1965 due to budget constraints.

== History ==
"The 22nd Wing replaced an operational training unit at Hunter Field, Georgia on 5 December 1942 and began supervising and coordinating various aspects of dive bomber training for subordinate groups. It moved to Florida in February 1943 and continued training until 15 August 1943. Reestablished in July 1959 and later redesignated 22nd Strategic Aerospace Division, it assured that assigned units were organized, manned, trained, and equipped to conduct aerial refueling operations and long-range strategic bombing using either nuclear weapons or conventional weapons. In addition, from 1962 to 1965 the division controlled Atlas ICBMs."

== Lineage ==
- Established as the 22nd Bombardment Training Wing on 28 November 1942

Activated on 5 December 1942
Disestablished on 15 August 1943

- Reestablished and redesignated 22nd Air Division on 1 July 1959

Activated on 15 July 1959
Redesignated 22nd Strategic Aerospace Division on 1 July 1962
Discontinued and inactivated on 1 July 1965

=== Assignments ===
- III Air Support Command, 5 December 1942
- III Fighter Command, 6 – 15 August 1943
- Second Air Force, 15 July 1959
- Fifteenth Air Force, 9 September 1960 – 1 July 1965

=== Components ===
Wings

- 6th Strategic Aerospace Wing: 1 July 1963 – 1 July 1965
- 310th Strategic Aerospace Wing: 1 July 1962 – 25 June 1965
- 341st Strategic Missile Wing: 15 July 1961 – 1 July 1962
- 461st Bombardment Wing: 1 February 1963 – 30 June 1964
- 4045th Air Refueling Wing: 15 July 1959 – 9 September 1960
- 4062nd Strategic Wing: 1 December 1960 – 20 February 1962
- 4090th Air Refueling Wing: 15 July 1959 [ 1 July 1960
- 4128th Strategic Wing: 1 July 1962 – 1 February 1963

Groups

- 84th Bombardment Group: 5 December 1942 – 15 August 1943
- 311th Bombardment Group: 5 December 1942 – c. July 1943
- 312th Bombardment Group: 5 December 1942 – c. March 1943
- 339th Bombardment Group: 5 December 1942 – 15 August 1943
- 405th Bombardment Group: 1 March – 15 August 1943
- 407th Bombardment Group: 7 April – 15 August 1943

=== Stations ===
- Hunter Field, Georgia, 5 December 1942
- Drew Field, Florida, 12 February – 15 August 1943
- Clinton County Air Force Base, Ohio, 15 July 1959
- Malmstrom Air Force Base, Montana, 9 September 1960
- Schilling Air Force Base, Kansas, 1 July 1962
- Walker Air Force Base, New Mexico, 1 July 1963 – 1 July 1965

== Bibliography ==
- Maurer, Maurer, ed. (1983) [1961]. Air Force Combat Units of World War II (PDF) (reprint ed.). Washington, DC: Office of Air Force History. ISBN 0-912799-02-1. LCCN 61060979. Archived from the original (PDF) on 20 December 2016.
- Ravenstein, Charles A. (1984). Air Force Combat Wings, Lineage & Honors Histories 1947–1977. Washington, DC: Office of Air Force History. ISBN 0-912799-12-9.
