= List of B-52 Units of the United States Air Force =

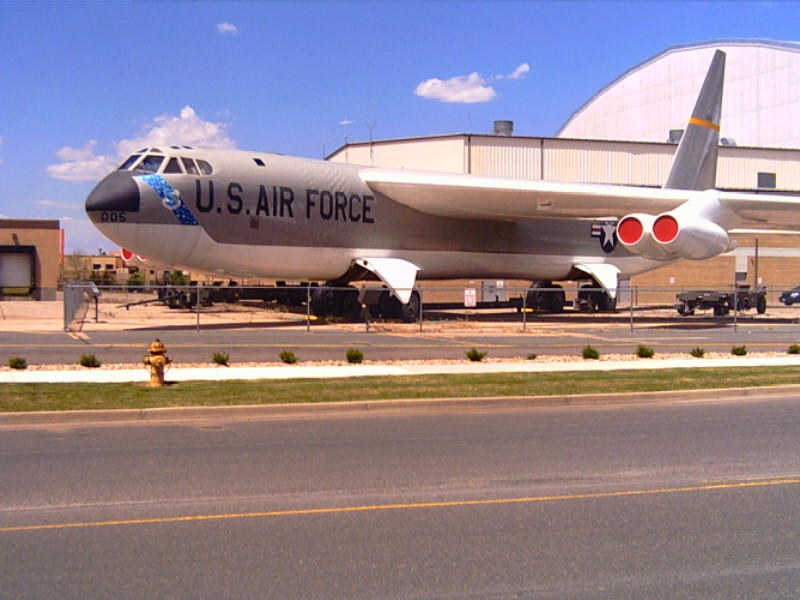
May 2007 photo of the Boeing RB-52B-5-BO Stratofortress 52–005 with tail colour for the Yellowtails Squadron – 330th BS/93rd BW. Initially retired to Davis-Monthan AFB in February 1966, was used as a maintenance trainer at Lowry Technical Training Center until April 1982. Put on static display in 1984 and now part of the Wings Over the Rockies Air and Space Museum, Denver, Colorado.

Strategic Air Command (1955–1992)

Air Combat Command (1992–2010)

Air Force Global Strike Command (2010–present)

The Boeing B-52 Stratofortress has been operational with the United States Air Force since 5 June 1955. This list is of the units it's assigned to, and bases they're stationed at.

In addition to the USAF, A single RB-52B (52-008) was flown by the National Aeronautics and Space Administration (NASA) until it was retired on 17 December 2004. It now is on static display at the west gate of Edwards AFB, California. One other B-52H (61–0025) was flown for many years by the Air Force Flight Test Center at Edwards, and was transferred to NASA on 30 July 2001 as a replacement for the RB-52B. On 9 May 2008, that aircraft was flown for the last time to Sheppard AFB, Texas where it became a GB-52H maintenance trainer, never to fly again.

== Current USAF B-52 units ==
The only active operational model of the B-52 is the B-52H. It is currently stationed at three USAF bases, flown by four wings:

- 2nd Bomb Wing (AFGSC) – Barksdale AFB, Louisiana
  - 11th Bomb Squadron (B-52H, Tail Code: LA, Gold Tail Stripe)
  - 20th Bomb Squadron (B-52H, Tail Code: LA, Blue Tail Stripe)
  - 96th Bomb Squadron (B-52H, Tail Code: LA, Red Tail Stripe)
- 5th Bomb Wing (AFGSC) – Minot AFB, North Dakota
  - 23rd Bomb Squadron (B-52H, Tail Code: MT, Red Tail Stripe)
  - 69th Bomb Squadron (B-52H, Tail Code: MT, Yellow Tail Stripe)
- 307th Bomb Wing (AFRC) – Barksdale AFB, Louisiana
  - 93rd Bomb Squadron (B-52H, Tail Code: BD, Blue/Gold Chex Tail Stripe)
  - 343rd Bomb Squadron (B-52H, Tail Code: BD, Red/Gray Chex Tail Stripe)
- 412th Test Wing (AFMC) – Edwards AFB, California
  - 419th Flight Test Squadron (B-52H, Tail Code: ED)

== Historical USAF B-52 units ==
2nd Bombardment Wing (Heavy), Barksdale AFB, Louisiana
Activated by re-designation of: 4238th Strategic Wing
B-52F, 1963–1965; B-52G, 1965–1992; B-52H, 1992–present

11th Bombardment Squadron (B-52H)
20th Bombardment Squadron (B-52F/H) (to 7th BW 6/65 – from 7th BW 12/92)
62nd Bombardment Squadron (B-52G) (from 39th BW 6/65, inactivated 12/92)
96th Bombardment Squadron (B-52H)
596th Bombardment Squadron (B-52G) (from 397th BW 4/68)

Currently flying B-52Hs at Barksdale AFB

- 5th Bombardment Wing (Heavy)

Travis AFB, California (1959–1968)
Minot AFB, North Dakota, (1968–Current)
B-52B, 1959; B-52G, 1959–1968; B-52H, 1968–Current

23rd Bombardment Squadron
31st Bombardment Squadron (to 4126th SW 1/60)
72nd Bombardment Squadron (B-52H)

Currently flying B-52Hs at Minot AFB.

- 6th Bombardment (later Strategic Aerospace) Wing, Walker AFB, New Mexico

B-52E, 1957–1967

24th Bombardment Squadron
39th Bombardment Squadron
40th Bombardment Squadron
4129th Combat Crew Training Squadron (1959–1963)

Moved to Eielson AFB, AK after closure of Walker AFB in 1967; 24th BS began flying RC-135s.

- 7th Bombardment Wing (Heavy), Carswell AFB, Texas

B-52F, 1958–1969; B-52D, 1969–1983; B-52H, 1982–1992
Moved to Dyess AFB, TX after closure of Carswell AFB and transfer to US Navy as NAS JRB Fort Worth/Carswell Field; became B-1B Wing (9th BS)

9th Bombardment Squadron
20th Bombardment Squadron (from 2d BW 6/65 to 2d BW 12/92)
492nd Bombardment Squadron (to 4228th SW at Columbus AFB)

- 11th Bombardment (later Strategic Aerospace) Wing, Altus AFB, Oklahoma

B-52E, 1958–1968

26th Bombardment Squadron
98th Bombardment Squadron (Reassigned to 4123 SW at Carswell AFB 1958-1958 and relocated to Clinton-Sherman AFB in 1959)
42nd Bombardment Squadron (Reassigned to 4043 SW in 1960)

Became KC-135 Air Refueling Wing in 1968

- 17th Bombardment Wing (Heavy)

Wright-Patterson AFB, Ohio (1963–1975)
Beale AFB, California, (1975–1976)
Activated to replace: 4043d Strategic Wing
B-52E, 1963–1968; B-52H, 1968–1975; B-52G, 1975–1976

34th Bombardment Squadron (B-52E a/c from 42 BS, B-52G a/c from 744 BS)

Inactivated in 1976; Beale AFB became a SAC Strategic Recon base for SR-71 and U-2 operations.

- 19th Bombardment Wing (Heavy)

Homestead AFB, Florida (1962–1968)
Robins AFB, Georgia (1968–1983)
B-52H, 1962–1968; B-52G, 1968–1983

28th Bombardment Squadron (B-52G a/c from 781st BS, 7/68)

Became 19th Air Refueling Wing in 1983

- 22nd Bombardment Wing (Heavy), March AFB, California

B-52B, 1963–1966; B-52D, 1966–1982

2nd Bombardment Squadron
486th Bombardment Squadron (B-52D a/c from 781st BS)

The 22nd Bombardment Squadron became 22nd Air Refueling Wing in 1982,
and the 2nd Bombardment Squadron became the 2nd Strategic Squadron in 1988,

- 28th Bombardment Wing (Heavy), Ellsworth AFB, South Dakota

B-52D, 1957–1971; B-52G, 1971–1977; 1977–1985

77th Bombardment Squadron
717th Bombardment Squadron (Reassigned to 4245 SW in 1960)
718th Bombardment Squadron (Reassigned to 4128 SW in 1960)

Equipped with B-1B Lancer in 1986

- 39th Bombardment Wing (Heavy), Eglin AFB, Florida

Activated to replace: 4135th Strategic Wing
B-52G, 1963–1965

62nd Bombardment Squadron (a/c from 301st BS; to 2nd BW 6/65)

Inactivated in 1965; Eglin AFB SAC facilities transferred to TAC

- 42nd Bombardment Wing (Heavy), Loring AFB, Maine

B-52C, 1956–1957; B-52D, 1957–1959; B-52G, 1959–1994

69th Bombardment Squadron
70th Bombardment Squadron (inactivated 6/66; a/c to 528 BS/380 SAW)
75th Bombardment Squadron (Reassigned to 4039 SW in 1959)

Inactivated in 1994; Loring AFB closed per BRAC

- 43rd Strategic Wing, Andersen AFB, Guam

B-52D, 1972–1983; B-52G, 1983–1990

60th Bombardment Squadron
63rd Bombardment Squadron (Provisional), 1972–1973

Inactivated in 1990; Andersen transferred to PACAF

- 68th Bombardment Wing (Heavy), Seymour Johnson AFB, North Carolina

Activated to replace: 4241st Strategic Wing
B-52G, 1963–1982

51st Bombardment Squadron (a/c from 73rd BS)

Became 68th Air Refueling Wing in 1982

- 70th Bombardment Wing (Heavy), Clinton-Sherman AFB, Oklahoma

Activated to replace: 4123rd Strategic Wing
B-52E, 1963–1968; B-52D, 1968–1969

6th Bombardment Squadron (a/c from 98 BS)

Inactivated in 1969; Clinton-Sherman AFB closed.

- 72nd Bombardment Wing (Heavy)

Ramey AFB, Puerto Rico (1959–1971)
Andersen AFB, Guam (1972–1973)
B-52G, 1959–1971, 1972–1973

60th Bombardment Squadron (transferred to 43rd SW in 1971

Inactivated in 1971; Ramey AFB closed; portion transferred to US Coast Guard as AIRSTA Borinquen
Provisional wing at Andersen for Linebacker I, II 1972–1973 (Vietnam War)

- 91st Bombardment Wing (Heavy), Glasgow AFB, Montana

Activated to replace: 4141st Strategic Wing
B-52D, 1963–1968

322nd Bombardment Squadron

Inactivated in 1968; Glasgow AFB closed; Became 91st Strategic Missile Wing in 1968 at Minot AFB

- 92nd Bombardment (later Strategic Aerospace) Wing, Fairchild AFB, Washington

B-52D, 1957–1971; B-52G, 1970–1986; B-52H, 1986–1994

325th Bombardment Squadron
326th Bombardment Squadron (B-52D) (Reassigned to 4141 SW in 1961)
327th Bombardment Squadron (B-52D) (Reassigned to 4170 SW in 1961)

Became 92nd Air Refueling Wing in 1994

- 93rd Bombardment Wing (Heavy), Castle AFB, California

B-52B, 1955–1965; B-52D, 1956–1958; B-52E, 1957–1958, 1967–1970; B-52F, 1958–1974; B-52G, 1966–1967, 1974–1994; B-52H, 1974–1993

328th Bombardment Squadron
329th Bombardment Squadron
330th Bombardment Squadron (1955–1963) (1988–1991)
4017th Combat Crew Training Squadron (1955–1956)

Inactivated in 1995; Castle AFB closed per BRAC.

- 95th Bombardment Wing (Heavy), Biggs AFB, Texas

B-52B, 1959–1966

334th Bombardment Squadron (1959–1966)

Inactivated in 1966; Biggs AFB closed and transferred to US Army as Biggs AAF.

- 96th Bombardment Wing, (Heavy) Dyess AFB, Texas

B-52E, 1963–1970; B-52D, 1969–1982; B-52H, 1982–1985

337th Bombardment Squadron

Inactivated in 1993; Dyess AFB became B-1B base Jun 1985

- 97th Bombardment Wing (Heavy), Eaker AFB, Arkansas

B-52G, 1960–1992

340th Bombardment Squadron

Inactivated in 1992; Eaker AFB closed per BRAC; became 97th Airlift Wing at Altus AFB in 1992

- 99th Bombardment Wing (Heavy), Westover AFB, Massachusetts

B-52C, 1956–1966; B-52B, 1958–1959; B-52D, 1957–1961, 1966–1974

346th Bombardment Squadron
347th Bombardment Squadron (Reassigned to 4047 SW in 1961)
348th Bombardment Squadron

Inactivated in 1974; Westover AFB transferred to Air Force Reserve as Westover ARB.

- 306th Bombardment Wing (Heavy), McCoy AFB, Florida

Activated to replace: 4047th Strategic Wing
B-52D, 1963–1973

367th Bombardment Squadron (a/c from 347 BS)

Inactivated in 1974; McCoy AFB closed. Became 306th Strategic Wing at RAF Mildenhall, UK in 1975

- 307th Strategic Wing, U-Tapao RTNAF, Thailand

B-52D, 1973–1975

364th Bombardment Squadron (Provisional)
365th Bombardment Squadron (Provisional)

Inactivated in 1975; USAF ops at U-Tapao RTAFB closed out and transferred to Royal Thai Air Force.

- 319th Bombardment Wing (Heavy), Grand Forks AFB, North Dakota

Activated to replace: 4133d Strategic Wing
B-52H, 1963–1982; B-52G, 1982–1986

46th Bombardment Squadron (a/c from 30th BS)

Equipped with B-1B Lancer 1987–88
Became 319th Air Refueling Wing in 1994

- 320th Bombardment Wing (Heavy), Mather AFB, California

Activated to replace: 4134th Strategic Wing
B-52F, 1963–1968; B-52G, 1968–1989

441st Bombardment Squadron (a/c from 72d BS)

Tenant SAC unit on ATC base. Inactivated in 1989; Mather AFB closed in 1991 per BRAC.

- 340th Bombardment Wing (Heavy), Bergstrom AFB, Texas

Activated to replace: 4130th Strategic Wing
B-52D, 1963–1966

486th Bombardment Squadron (a/c from 335 BS)

Inactivated in 1966; reactivated and equipped with FB-111s in 1968

- 366th Wing (Headquartered at Mountain Home AFB, Idaho; aircraft located at Castle AFB, California)

B-52G, 1992–1994

34th Bombardment Squadron

34 BS equipped with B-1B Lancers in 1994

- 376th Strategic Wing, Kadena AB, Okinawa

4180th Bombardment Squadron (Provisional) (never made operational)

Equipped with RC-135s in 1970 when B-52s withdrawn from Kadena AB.

- 379th Bombardment Wing (Heavy), Wurtsmith AFB, Michigan

B-52H, 1961–1977; B-52G, 1977–1992

524th Bombardment Squadron

Inactivated in 1993; Wurtsmith AFB closed per BRAC

- 380th Strategic Aerospace Wing, Plattsburgh AFB, New York

B-52G, 1966–1971

528th Bombardment Squadron (a/c from 70th BS)

Re-equipped with FB-111s in 1971; Inactivated 1995 and Plattsburgh AFB closed per BRAC

- 397th Bombardment Wing (Heavy), Dow AFB, Maine

Activated to replace: 4038th Strategic Wing
B-52G, 1963–1968

596th Bombardment Squadron (a/c from 341st BS)

Inactivated in 1968; Dow AFB closed.

- 410th Bombardment Wing (Heavy), K. I. Sawyer AFB, Michigan

Activated to replace 4042d Strategic Wing
B-52H, 1963–1994

644th Bombardment Squadron (a/c from 526th BS)

Inactivated in 1995; K. I. Sawyer AFB closed per BRAC

- 416th Bombardment Wing (Heavy), Griffiss AFB, New York

Activated to replace 4039th Strategic Wing
B-52G, 1963–1992; B-52H, 1992–1995

668th Bombardment Squadron (a/c from 75th BS)

Inactivated in 1995; Griffiss AFB closed per BRAC.

- 449th Bombardment Wing (Heavy), Kincheloe AFB, Michigan

Activated to replace 4239th Strategic Wing
B-52H, 1963–1977

716th Bombardment Squadron (a/c from 93rd BS)

Inactivated in 1977; Kincheloe AFB closed

- 450th Bombardment Wing (Heavy), Minot AFB, North Dakota

Activated to replace 4136th Strategic Wing
B-52H, 1963–1968

720th Bombardment Squadron (a/c from 525th BS)

Inactivated in 1968

- 454th Bombardment Wing (Heavy), Columbus AFB, Mississippi

Activated to replace 4228th Strategic Wing
B-52F, 1963–1966; B-52D, 1966–1969

736th Bombardment Squadron (a/c from 492nd BS)

Inactivated in 1969; Columbus AFB transferred to ATC

- 456th Strategic Aerospace (later Bombardment) Wing, Beale AFB, California

B-52G, 1963–1975
Activated to replace 4126th Strategic Wing

744th Bombardment Squadron (a/c from 31st BS, a/c to 34th BS)

Wing Inactivated in 1975, replaced by 17th Bombardment Wing

- 461st Bombardment Wing (Heavy), Amarillo AFB, Texas

B-52D, 1963–1968
Activated to replace4128th Strategic Wing

764th Bombardment Squadron (a/c from 718 BS)

Inactivated in 1968; Amarillo AFB closed.

- 462nd Strategic Aerospace Wing, Larson AFB, Washington

Activated to replace 4170th Strategic Wing
B-52D, 1963–1966

768th Bombardment Squadron (a/c from 327 BS)

Inactivated in 1966; Larson AFB closed.

- 465th Bombardment Wing (Heavy), Robins AFB, Georgia

Activated to replace 4137th Strategic Wing
B-52G, 1963–1968

781st Bombardment Squadron (a/c from 342d BS)

Tenant SAC unit on AFLC base; Inactivated in 1968

- 484th Bombardment Wing (Heavy), Turner AFB, Georgia

Activated to replace 4138th Strategic Wing
B-52D, 1963–1967

824th Bombardment Squadron (a/c from 336 BS)

Inactivated in 1967; Turner AFB closed and transferred to US Navy in 1968 as NAS Albany.

- 494th Bombardment Wing (Heavy), Sheppard AFB, Texas

Activated to replace 4245th Strategic Wing
B-52D, 1963–1966

864th Bombardment Squadron (a/c from 717 BS)

SAC tenant unit on ATC base; Inactivated in 1966

- 509th Bombardment Wing (Heavy), Pease AFB, New Hampshire

B-52D, 1966–1969

393rd Bombardment Squadron

Re-equipped with FB-111s in 1970; Inactivated 1995, Pease AFB transferred to Air National Guard as Pease ANGB per BRAC

== Historical Strategic Air Command MAJCOM B-52 units ==
Strategic Wings were established by Strategic Air Command in the late 1950s to disburse its B-52 bombers over a larger number of bases, thus making it more difficult for the Soviet Union to knock out the entire fleet with a surprise first strike. A 4-Digit MAJCOM wing, they were considered as temporary, provisional units.

Beginning in 1962, in order to retain the lineage of the Strategic Wings as combat units and to perpetuate the lineage of many currently inactive bombardment units with illustrious World War II records, Headquarters SAC received authority from Headquarters USAF to discontinue its MAJCOM strategic wings that were equipped with combat aircraft and to activate AFCON units, most of which were inactive at the time which could carry a lineage and history. Component units were also redesignated to historically linked units of the newly established wing. Therefore, the history, lineage and honors of the World War II historical units were bestowed upon the newly established wing upon activation.

- 4038th Strategic Wing Dow AFB, Maine

B-52G, 1960–1963

341st Bombardment Squadron Inactivated on 1 February 1963, assets to 596th BS/397th BW

- 4039th Strategic Wing Griffiss AFB, New York

B-52G, 1960–1963

75th Bombardment Squadron Inactivated on 1 February 1963, assets to 668th BS/416th BW

- 4042nd Strategic Wing K. I. Sawyer AFB, Michigan

B-52H, 1961–1963

526th Bombardment Squadron Inactivated on 1 February 1963, assets to 644th BS/410th BW

- 4043rd Strategic Wing Wright-Patterson AFB, Ohio

B-52E, 1960–1963

42nd Bombardment Squadron Inactivated on 1 February 1963, assets to 34th BS/17th BW

- 4047th Strategic Wing McCoy AFB, Florida

B-52D, 1961–1963

347th Bombardment Squadron Inactivated on 1 February 1963, assets to 367th BS/306th BW

- 4123r d Strategic Wing Clinton-Sherman AFB, Oklahoma

B-52E, 1959–1963

98th Bombardment Squadron Inactivated on 1 February 1963, assets to 6th BS/70th BW

- 4126th Strategic Wing Beale AFB, California

B-52G, 1960–1963

31st Bombardment Squadron Inactivated on 1 February 1963, assets to 744th BS/456th SAW

- 4128th Strategic Wing Amarillo AFB, Texas

B-52D, 1960–1963

718th Bombardment Squadron Inactivated on 1 February 1963, assets to 764th BS/461st BW

- 4130th Strategic Wing Bergstrom AFB, Texas

B-52D, 1959–1963

335th Bombardment Squadron Inactivated on 1 September 1963, assets to 486th BS/340th BW

- 4133rd Strategic Wing Grand Forks AFB, North Dakota

B-52H, 1962–1963

30th Bombardment Squadron Inactivated on 1 February 1963, assets to 46th BS/319th BW

- 4134th Strategic Wing Mather AFB, California

B-52F, 1958–1963

72nd Bombardment Squadron Inactivated on 1 September 1963, assets to 441st BS/320th BW

- 4135th Strategic Wing Eglin AFB, Florida

B-52G, 1959–1963

301st Bombardment Squadron Inactivated on 1 February 1963, assets to 62nd BS/39th BW

- 4136th Strategic Wing Minot AFB, North Dakota

B-52H, 1961–1963

525th Bombardment Squadron Inactivated on 1 February 1963, assets to 720th BS/450th BW

- 4137th Strategic Wing Robins AFB, Georgia

B-52G, 1960–1963

342nd Bombardment Squadron Inactivated on 1 February 1963, assets to 781st BS/465th BW

- 4138th Strategic Wing Turner AFB, Georgia

B-52D, 1959–1963

336th Bombardment Squadron Inactivated on 1 February 1963, assets to 824th BS/484th BW

- 4141st Strategic Wing Glasgow AFB, Montana

B-52D, 1959–1963

326th Bombardment Squadron Inactivated on 1 February 1963, assets to 322nd BS/91st BW

- 4170th Strategic Wing Larson AFB, Washington

B-52D, 1960–1963

327th Bombardment Squadron Inactivated on 1 February 1963, assets to 768th BS/462nd BW

- 4200th Strategic Reconnaissance Wing, Beale AFB, California

B-52H, 1 Apr 1965 – 25 June 1966
(Special Unit with 2 Modified B-52H for Air Sampling & D-21 operations

4201st Strategic Reconnaissance Squadron

Wing Inactivated in 1966, replaced by 9th Strategic Reconnaissance Wing with the B-52Hs Demodified

- 4228th Strategic Wing Columbus AFB, Mississippi

B-52F, 1959–1963

492d Bombardment Squadron Inactivated on 1 February 1963, assets to 736th BS/454th BW

- 4238th Strategic Wing Barksdale AFB, Louisiana

B-52F, 1958–1963

436th Bombardment Squadron Inactivated on 1 February 1963, assets to 20th BS/2nd BW

- 4239th Strategic Wing Kincheloe AFB, Michigan

B-52H, 1961–1963

93rd Bombardment Squadron Inactivated on 1 February 1963, assets to 716th BS/449th BW

- 4241st Strategic Wing Seymour Johnson AFB, North Carolina

B-52G, 1959–1963

73rd Bombardment Squadron Inactivated on 1 February 1963, assets to 51st BS/68th BW

- 4245th Strategic Wing Sheppard AFB, Texas

B-52D, 1960–1963

717th Bombardment Squadron Inactivated on 1 February 1963, assets to 864th BS/494th BW

== Provisional B-52 units ==
- Vietnam War

72nd Strategic Wing (Provisional), Andersen AFB, Guam

Provisional SAC MAJCOM unit, June 1972 – November 1973

4133rd Bombardment Wing (Provisional), Andersen AFB, Guam

Provisional SAC MAJCOM unit, February 1966 – July 1970 (Replaced by 43d Strategic Wing)

4525th Strategic Wing Kadena AB, Okinawa

SAC MAJCOM unit, April 1967 – April 1970 (Replaced by 376th Strategic Wing) Note: The 376th Strategic Wing operated B-52Ds until Aug 1970.

4258th Strategic Wing, U-Tapao RTNAF, Thailand

SAC MAJCOM unit, April 1967 – April 1970 (Replaced by 307th Strategic Wing)

Andersen AFB & Kadena AB started primarily with B-52Fs and later B-52Ds aircraft; aircrew and support personnel deployed from CONUS B-52 wings on a rotational basis / U-TAPAO AB started operation after the B-52D became the primary mission aircraft; SW(P)72 at Andersen AFB was only equipped with B-52Gs

- Operation Desert Storm

801st Provisional Bombardment Wing, Moron AFB, Spain

Activated in January 1991. Inactivated March 1991.
Composed of B-52G aircraft and personnel

806th Provisional Bombardment Wing, RAF Fairford, England

Activated in January 1991. Inactivated March 1991.
Composed of B-52G aircraft and personnel from the 62d, 340th, 524th, and 668th Bombardment Squadrons

1701st Provisional Air Refueling Wing, Prince Abdulla AB, Jeddah, Saudi Arabia

Activated in August 1990. Inactivated March 1991.
Air refueling wing of KC-10s, KC-135s. Had 6 B-52Gs from 60th Bombardment Squadron (January–March 1991)

1703rd Provisional Air Refueling Wing, King Khalid Military City, Saudi Arabia

Activated in August 1990. Inactivated March 1991.
Air refueling wing of KC-135s. Had 7 B-52Gs from 69th Bombardment Squadron (October 1990 – March 1991)

1708th Provisional Bombardment Wing, Prince Abdulla AB, Jeddah, Saudi Arabia

Activated in August 1990. Inactivated March 1991.
Composed of B-52G aircraft and personnel from the 69th and 524th Bombardment Squadrons (August 1990 – March 1991)

Additional B-52G aircraft and personnel from the 69th, 524th, 596th, 328th and 668th Bombardment Squadrons (December 1990 – March 1991)

4300th Provisional Bombardment Wing, Diego Garcia AB, British Indian Ocean Territories

Activated in January 1991. Inactivated March 1991
Composed of B-52G aircraft and personnel from the 69th and 328th Bombardment Squadrons. Also Air Force personnel from other B-52 units across the SAC bases in the United States.

- Global war on terrorism

20th Expeditionary Bomb Squadron
23d Expeditionary Bomb Squadron
40th Expeditionary Bomb Squadron
96th Expeditionary Bomb Squadron
