= 6th Air Refueling Wing =

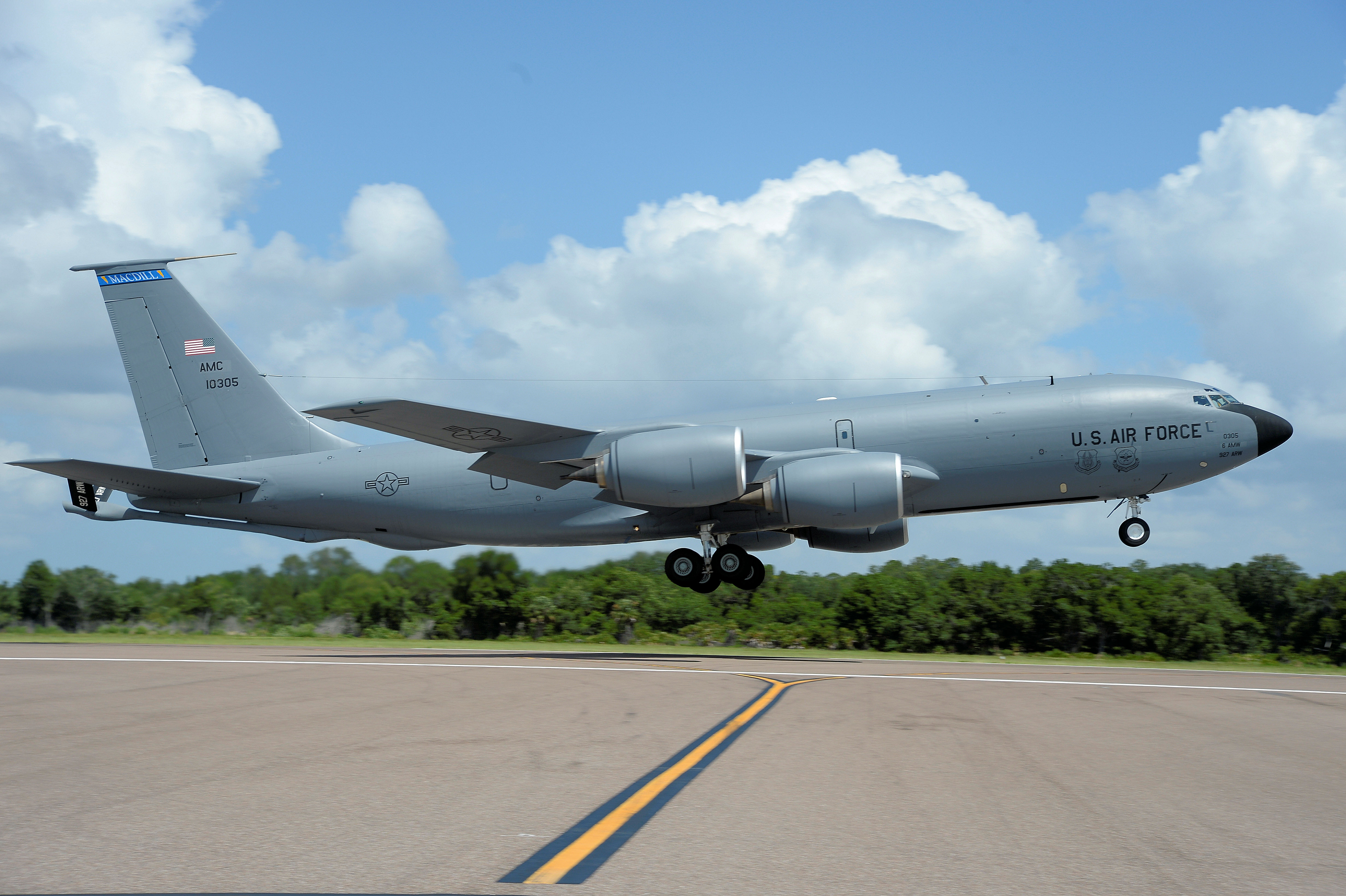
- 6th Air Refueling Wing KC-135 Stratotanker takes off from MacDill Air Force Base (Note: Aircraft is Boeing KC-135R Stratotanker, serial 61-0305, taken on 29 May 2013.)
- Active: 1951–1992; 1994–present
- Country: United States
- Branch: United States Air Force
- Role: Air refueling
- Part of: Air Mobility Command
- Garrison/HQ: MacDill AFB, Florida
- Motto: Parati Defendere (Latin for 'Ready to Defend')
- Equipment: Boeing KC-135R Stratotanker
- Decorations: Air Force Outstanding Unit Award (Note: The 6th Wing is entitled to display the campaign credits and decorations earned by the 6th Operations Group prior to the activation of the wing in 1951. Robertson, Factsheet.)

Commanders
- Current commander: Colonel Kevin H. Eley
- Vice Commander: Colonel Keaton B. Askew
- Command Chief: Chief Master Sergeant Christopher S. Ottenwess

Insignia
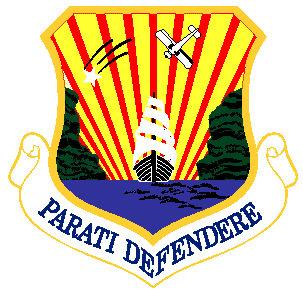
- 6th Air Refueling Wing emblem (Note: Adopted 18 March 1955, reinstated 20 September 1988. The 6th Bombardment Wing also used the distinctive unit insignia approved for the 6th Bombardment Group, which consisted of the crest of the group's coat of arms, a pirate's head, superimposed on a triangle.)

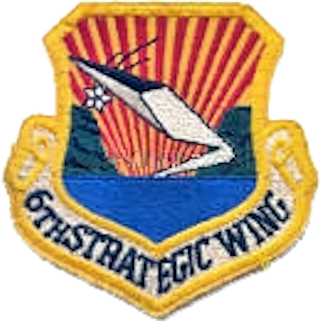
- Patch with 6th Strategic Wing emblem (Note: Approved 21 October 1980.)

The United States Air Force's 6th Air Refueling Wing is the host wing for MacDill Air Force Base, Florida. It is part of Air Mobility Command's Eighteenth Air Force. The wing's 6th Operations Group is a successor organization of the 3d Observation Group, one of the seven original combat air groups formed by the United States Army Air Service shortly after the end of World War I.

The 6th Air Refueling Wing provides day-to-day mission support to more than 3,000 personnel along with more than 50 mission partners, including the United States Central Command and United States Special Operations Command. It is a force capable of rapidly projecting air refueling power anywhere in the world. The 6 ARW is organized into four unique groups and three operational flying squadrons to carry out its mission to be provide air refueling, airlift, and air base support.

== History ==
=== Strategic bomber operations ===
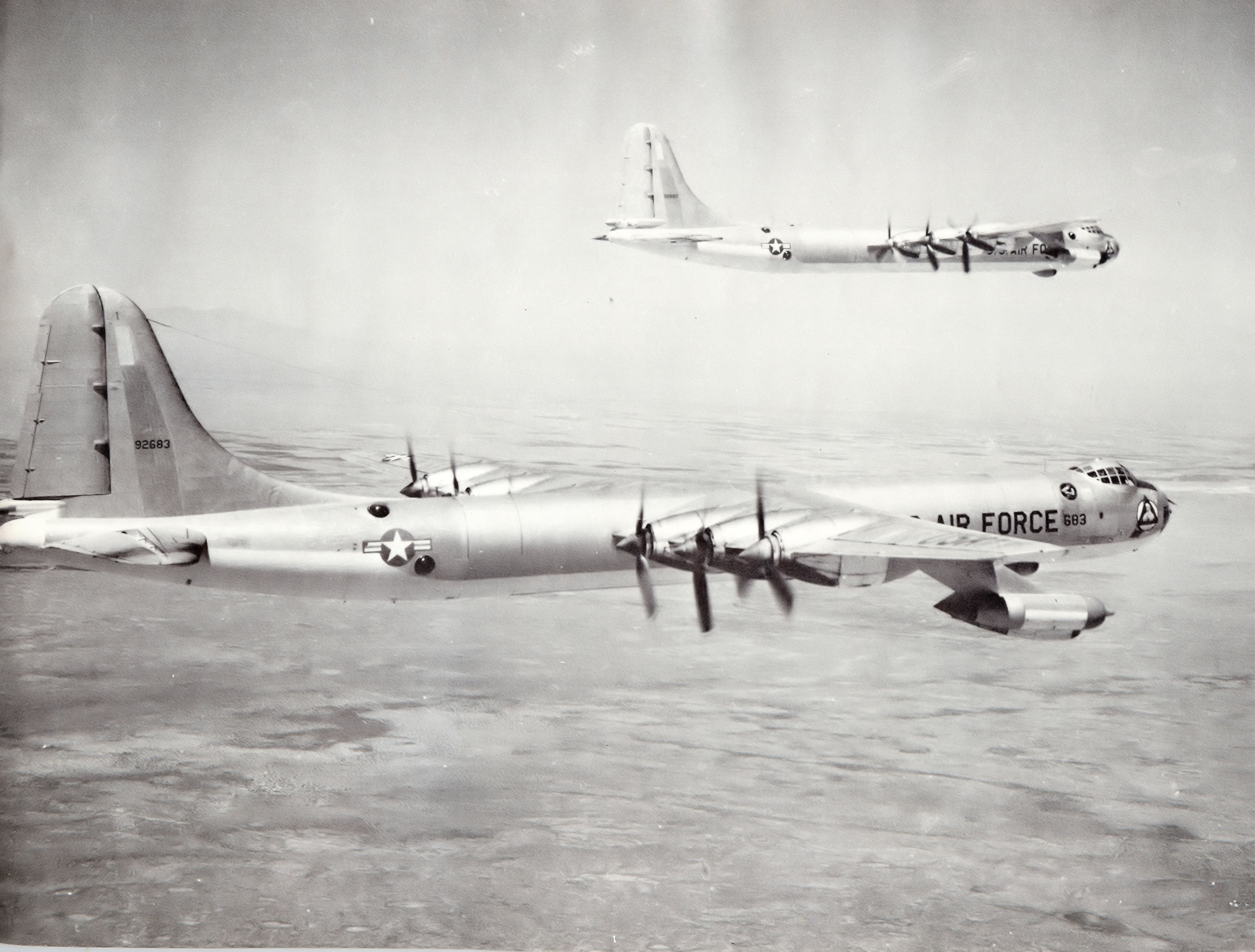
6th Bombardment Wing B-36 Peacemakers (Note: Aircraft are Convair B-36 Peacemakers, serials 49-2683 and 49-2680, c. 1955.)

The 6th Bombardment Wing (Medium) was activated Walker Air Force Base, New Mexico on 2 January 1951, where it was assigned to Strategic Air Command (SAC)'s Eighth Air Force. The 24th, 39th and 40th Bombardment Squadrons were simultaneously activated. The squadrons were nominally assigned to the wing's 6th Bombardment Group, but the group was not operational and the squadrons were attached directly to the wing's headquarters until the group was inactivated in June 1952. The wing was equipped with Boeing B-29 Superfortress bombers. In August, the 307th Air Refueling Squadron, operating KB-29P Superfortress tankers to refuel the wing's bombers, moved to Walker from Davis-Monthan Air Force Base, Arizona, and was also attached to the wing. (Note: Unlike the bomber squadrons, the 307th was not a component of the 6th Group, but was assigned to the 307th Bombardment Wing at MacDill Air Force Base. Ravenstein, Combat Wings, p. 154.)

One month after the wing was activated, it was assigned to the 47th Air Division, which was activated at Walker to serve as the headquarters for the 6th and Walker's second wing, the 509th Bombardment Wing. In 1952, the 6th converted from the B-29 to the Convair B-36 Peacemaker. The Peacemaker did not require air refueling, so the 307th Squadron's attachment to the wing ended. On 31 October 1955, the entire wing deployed to Anderson Air Force Base, Guam, remaining there until 26 January 1956, when it returned to Walker. The wing continued to fly the B-36 until 1957, when it began converting to the Boeing B-52 Stratofortress.

==== Crew training ====
The air refuelable B-52 brought with it a return of the air refueling mission, this time with the Boeing KC-135 Stratotankers of the 6th Air Refueling Squadron. SAC was expanding the number of its B-52 wings, increasing the number of B-52 crews it had to train. On 1 August 1959, the 4129th Combat Crew Training Squadron was organized and assigned to the wing to conduct ground training of new crews, while the following month, the 24th and 39th Bombardment Squadrons (Note: Both Ravenstein and Robertson list the "30th" Squadron. Since no squadron with this number was assigned to the wing, this would seem to be a repeated typographical error.) began flying training.

The 40th Bombardment Squadron continued to train for combat missions. On 10 June 1960, the entire wing became non-operational, a status that lasted until 1 December 1961, when the 40th returned to combat status. One third of the squadron's aircraft were maintained on fifteen minute alert, fully fueled and ready for combat to reduce vulnerability to a Soviet missile strike. This was increased to half the squadron's aircraft in 1962.

==== Missile operations ====
The 579th Strategic Missile Squadron was activated in September 1961 as an SM-65 Atlas-F squadron. This addition of ICBMs resulted in the wing's redesignation as the 6th Strategic Aerospace Wing in May 1962. The squadron received its first ICBM on 24 January 1962. At the beginning of the Cuban Missile Crisis of October 1962 six of the squadron's missile sites had not yet been turned over to SAC by Air Force Systems Command (AFSC). On 24 October, AFSC began to bring these missiles up to alert status. Once the crisis had abated, these missiles were removed from alert until normal training and testing could be completed. On 1 June 1963, a crew of the 579th was conducting a propellant loading exercise when an explosion occurred, destroying the squadron's launch complex 1. A nearly identical accident on 13 February 1964 destroyed launch complex 5, followed less than a month later, on 9 March 1964, by the destruction of launch complex 2 in another explosion.

On 19 November 1964, Secretary of Defense Robert MacNamara announced Project Added Effort which would phase out that all Atlas-F missiles by the end of June 1965. In implementing this project, the 579th Strategic Missile Squadron phased out its missile operations in February and inactivated on 25 March 1965.

==== Return to bomber operations ====
The Cuban Missile Crisis impacted the wing's flying force as well. On 20 October each of the wing's B-52 squadrons was directed to put two additional planes on alert. Additional KC-135s were also placed on alert to replace KC-135s devoted to maintaining 1/8 of SAC's B-52 bomber force on airborne alert. On 24 October SAC went to DEFCON 2, placing all aircraft on alert. On 21 November SAC returned to its normal alert posture. However, the wing's return to the training mission was short-lived, for on 5 September 1963, the 24th and 39th Squadrons returned to combat status, and three weeks later, on 25 September, the 39th Bombardment Squadron and 4129th Combat Crew Training Squadron were discontinued.

In June 1965, the 310th Air Refueling Squadron moved to Walker from Schilling Air Force Base. The 310th had supported the Boeing B-47 Stratojets of the 310th Bombardment Wing at Schilling with Boeing KC-97s, but in preparation for its move to Walker, had re-equipped with KC-135s during 1964. This made the 6th a double-sized wing and one of the largest in SAC with its 60 heavy jet aircraft. Soon after, on 8 December 1965, the Department of Defense announced that Walker would close in connection with the drawdown of older model B-52s.

All operational elements of the wing had ceased operations by 25 January 1957. The 310th Air Refueling Squadron moved to Plattsburgh Air Force Base, New York while the remaining operational squadrons were discontinued. On 25 March, wing headquarters moved on paper to Eielson Air Force Base.

=== Strategic reconnaissance ===
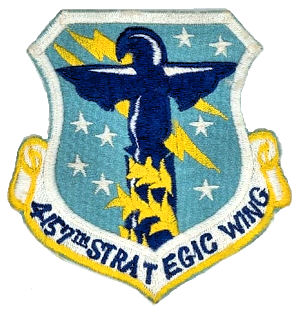
Emblem of the 4157th Strategic Wing

==== Background ====
SAC had long deployed bombardment and reconnaissance aircraft to the Arctic. In 1955, the tactical and maintenance elements of the 90th Bombardment Wing deployed to Eielson Air Force Base, Alaska, and SAC formed the provisional Eielson Task Force to control its forces temporarily stationed there. In August of the following year, the 14th Aviation Depot Squadron (later the 14th Munitions Maintenance Squadron) of Fifteenth Air Force moved to Eielson to oversee special weapons there.

On 1 July 1960, SAC formed the 4157th Combat Support Group to provide support for forward deployed SAC bombardment and reconnaissance elements at Eielson. The group was a tenant of the 5010th Air Base Wing (later 5010th Combat Support Group) of Alaskan Air Command. Its original component squadron was the 14th Aviation Depot Squadron. When the focus of the 4157th shifted to reconnaissance with the discontinuance of tanker operations in August 1962, the 14th was inactivated. In 1962, the group expanded to become the 4157th Strategic Wing, and its commander assumed duties as the commander of the Eielson Task Force. The wing mission had expanded to include air refueling support for B-52s involved with Operation Chrome Dome operations In 1966 it added a permanently based maintenance squadron was added to the wing to provide maintenance support for deployed aircraft.

In July 1965 the wing was reassigned to the 18th Strategic Aerospace Division, However, SAC Major Command Controlled (MAJCON) Strategic Wings could not carry a permanent history or lineage and SAC took the opportunity presented by the drawdown at Walker to replace the 4157th with the 6th Strategic Wing. (Note: The 6th Wing is entitled to retain the honors (but not the history or lineage) of the 4157th Strategic Wing.)

==== Move to Eielson ====
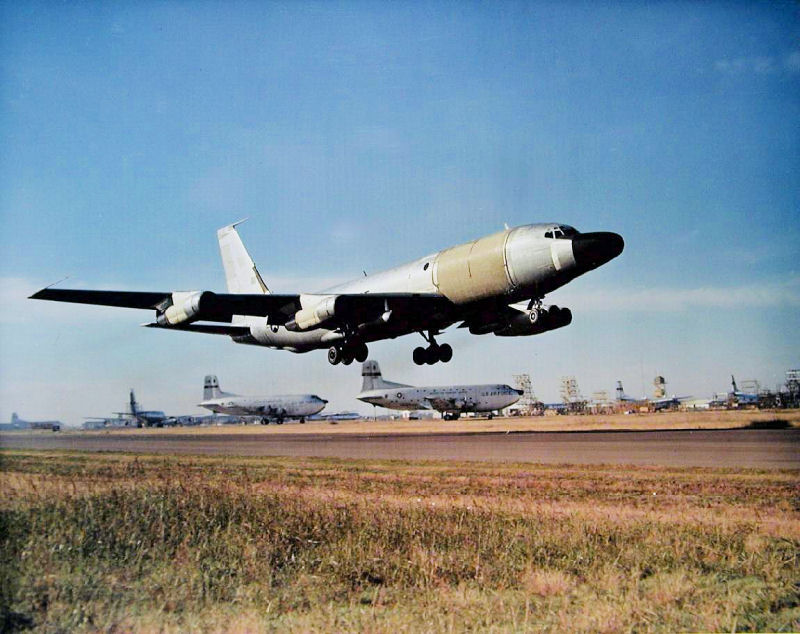
RC-135E "Rivet Amber" at Eielson AFB (Note: Aircraft is RC-135E, serial 62-4137, pictured here at McClellan AFB, California.)

The wing moved on paper to Eielson, where it became the 6th Strategic Wing and assumed the personnel, equipment and mission of the 4157th Strategic Wing. In addition to a maintenance squadron, the wing was assigned the new 24th Strategic Reconnaissance Squadron. (Note: The 24th Strategic Reconnaissance Squadron was newly constituted in December 1966. However, in September 1985, the reconnaissance and bombardment squadrons were consolidated into a single unit. Department of the Air Force/MPM Letter 662q, 19 Sep 85, Subject: Reconstitution, Redesignation, and Consolidation of Selected Air Force Tactical Squadrons.)

In Alaska, the wing's 24th Squadron flew RC–135 strategic reconnaissance missions and conducted Alaska Tanker Task Force (Note: The successor of the Eielson Task Force.) missions with deployed KC–135s from SAC, the Air Force Reserve and the Air National Guard. Task force aircraft flew missions to support reconnaissance and numerous exercises for the Air Force and United States Navy. From April 1968 to July 1972 the wing periodically served as the airborne monitor of the Alaskan Ballistic Missile Early Warning System station at Clear, Alaska. The wing maintained a detachment at Shemya Air Force Station, in the Aleutian Islands On two occasions, from February through May 1975 and June through September 1976, the wing moved all operations to Shemya when Eielson closed for repair of earthquake damage.

The wing won the P.T. Cullen Award for greatest contributions to SAC's photographic and signal intelligence effortsthree times, in 1973, 1978 and 1983. On 4 October 1968, exactly 11 years to the day after the launch of Sputnik-1, a wing Rivet Ball aircraft captured the first photographic evidence of a Soviet ICBM test with three multiple reentry vehicles.

The wing suffered several losses while at Eielson. On 13 January 1969, RC-135S, serial 59-1491 hydroplaned off the end of Runway 28 at Shemya while attempting to land after an operational mission. The aircraft was totally destroyed. No one was seriously injured. On 5 June 1969 an RC-135E crashed in the Bering Sea minutes after leaving Shemya. Nineteen crewmembers died. On 15 March 1981, an RC-135 Cobra Ball aircraft, serial 61-2664 departed Eielson for Shemya with 24 people on board. While attempting to land on Shemya they encountered a rapid decline in weather that resulted in a crash landing. Six men died and several medals were awarded for bravery. On 25 February 1985, an RC-135T, serial 55-3121 Rivet Dandy aircraft crashed into a mountainous area near Valdez, Alaska while on a training mission. All three crewmembers perished. The wreckage was not located until 2 August 1985.

On 1 April 1988, SAC renamed the wing the 6th Strategic Reconnaissance Wing. In December 1991, it was decided to transfer the wing's reconnaissance mission to the 55th Wing at Offutt Air Force Base, Nebraska, and terminate the Alaska Tanker Task. The 24th Strategic Reconnaissance Squadron moved to Offutt on 7 July 1992, terminating the wing's operational mission and it was inactivated on 1 September 1992.

=== Air mobility operations ===
==== Base support mission ====
Following the 1991 Base Realignment and Closure Commission decision to terminate the 56th Fighter Wing's mission at MacDill Air Force Base, Florida by the end of 1993 and relocate it and its General Dynamics F-16 Fighting Falcon aircraft to Luke Air Force Base, Arizona, Air Mobility Command assumed responsibility for operating MacDill and providing support for United States Special Operations Command (USSOCOM), United States Central Command (USCENTCOM) and other tenant units from Air Combat Command. The wing was redesignated the 6th Air Base Wing and activated on 4 January 1994 at MacDill to perform the support mission.

==== Return to flying operations ====
On 1 October 1996, the wing returned to a flying mission when the 91st Air Refueling Squadron and its KC-135R aircraft moved from Malmstrom Air Force Base, Montana to MacDill. The 6th Bombardment Group was reactivated as the 6th Operations Group to be the headquarters for the 91st Squadron and the wing was renamed the 6th Air Refueling Wing. The following year, the wing also assumed support responsibility for Boeing EC-135 command post aircraft at MacDill supporting USCENTCOM and USSOCOM commanders and a Boeing T-43 Bobcat supporting the United States Southern Command commander in Miami, Florida. The wing provided refueling support for global air mobility missions. In 1998, it deployed crews and aircraft to support Operation Northern Watch

On 1 January 2001, three C-37A Gulfstream V aircraft replaced the Bobcats. with the addition of the C-37s to the wing's EC-135Ys, the 310th Airlift Squadron was activated under the 6th Operations Group, and the wing was redesignated the 6th Air Mobility Wing. Following the 9/11 attacks, the wing also provided refueling support for fighters flying homeland security over the southeastern United States.

In 2013, the 310th AS received a United States Central Command deployment tasking to provide combat airlift to the Commander, International Security Assistance Force at Kabul International Airport. This tasking represented the DOD's first deployment of the C-37 to a combat zone. The 310th made two subsequent deployments that year.

The wing has twice won the Air Mobility Rodeo Best Air Mobility Wing Award; in 2000 and 2005.

On 1 October 2008, the 927th Air Refueling Wing moved on paper to MacDill from Selfridge Air National Guard Base, Michigan and became a classic reserve associate unit, providing crews and support personnel sharing operation of the 6th's KC-135R aircraft. The 927th had transferred its existing aircraft to the 127th Wing of the Michigan Air National Guard at Selfridge. This move resulted from a recommendation by the 2005 Base Realignment and Closure Commission.

The wing deploys to forward locations to support the global war on terrorism and performs medical evacuation missions from overseas theaters of operations. After the devastating earthquake in Haiti on 12 January 2010, the wing supported Operation United Response providing humanitarian aid to victims of the earthquake until June 2010.

==== Regular associate units ====
In April 2008, the 911th Air Refueling Squadron was activated at Seymour Johnson Air Force Base, North Carolina. The 911th is an "Active Associate" unit, partnering with the reserve 77th Air Refueling Squadron of the 916th Air Refueling Wing and using the 77th's KC-135Rs. The 911th was the first tanker active associate unit to be formed and the 77th received an additional eight airplanes for it to operate with the 911th. The squadron won its second Spaatz Trophy as an associate unit.

In October 2009, the 99th Air Refueling Squadron, was activated at Birmingham Air National Guard Base (since renamed Sumpter Smith ANGB), Alabama, as the wing's second active associate squadron. The 99th operates the KC-135Rs of the 106th Air Refueling Squadron of the Alabama Air National Guard's 117th Air Refueling Wing.

On 1 July 2019, the C-37As of the 310th Airlift Squadron were reassigned to other bases and the squadron was inactivated a few months later on 30 September 2019.

On 1 October 2019, due to the deactivation of the 310th Airlift Squadron, the 6th Air Mobility Wing was redesignated as the 6th Air Refueling Wing.

==== Iran War ====
Three members of the wing were killed in a KC-135 crash in Iraq during Operation Epic Fury: Maj. John A. Klinner, Capt. Ariana G. Savino, and Tech. Sgt. Ashley B. Pruitt.

=== Units circa 2025 ===
The 6th Air Refueling Wing consists of the following units:

- 6th Maintenance Group
- 6th Operations Group

50th Air Refueling Squadron KC-135R
91st Air Refueling Squadron KC-135R
99th Air Refueling Squadron KC-135R (Active Associate to Air National Guard – Sumpter Smith Air National Guard Base, Alabama)
911th Air Refueling Squadron KC-46A (Active Associate to Air Force Reserve Command – Seymour Johnson Air Force Base, North Carolina)

- 6th Medical Group
- 6th Mission Support Group
- 6th Comptroller Squadron

== Lineage ==
- Constituted as the 6th Bombardment Wing on 20 December 1950
- Activated on 2 January 1951

Redesignated 6th Bombardment Wing, Heavy on 16 June 1952
Redesignated 6th Strategic Aerospace Wing on 1 May 1962
Redesignated 6th Strategic Wing on 25 March 1967
Redesignated 6th Strategic Reconnaissance Wing on 1 April 1988

- Inactivated on 1 September 1992

Redesignated 6th Air Base Wing on 22 December 1993

- Activated on 4 January 1994

Redesignated: 6th Air Refueling Wing on 1 October 1996
Redesignated: 6th Air Mobility Wing on 1 January 2001
Redesignated: 6th Air Refueling Wing on 1 October 2019

=== Assignments ===
- Eighth Air Force, 2 January 1951
- 47th Air Division (later 47th Strategic Aerospace Division), 10 February 1951 (attached to 3d Air Division, 31 October 1955 – 26 January 1956)
- 22d Strategic Aerospace Division, 1 July 1963
- 12th Strategic Aerospace Division, 1 July 1965
- 18th Strategic Aerospace Division, 25 March 1967
- 12th Strategic Aerospace Division, 2 July 1968
- 14th Strategic Aerospace Division, 30 June 1971
- 47th Air Division, 1 October 1976
- 14th Air Division, 1 October 1985
- 3d Air Division, 9 August 1990
- Fifteenth Air Force, 1 April 1992 – 1 September 1992
- Ninth Air Force, 4 January 1994
- Twenty-First Air Force, 1 October 1996
- Eighteenth Air Force, 1 October 2003 – present

=== Operational Components ===
Groups

- 6th Bombardment Group (later 6th Operations Group): 2 January 1951 – 16 June 1952 (not operational), 1 October 1996 – present

Squadrons

- 6th Air Refueling Squadron: 3 January 1958 – 25 January 1967
- 24th Bombardment Squadron (later 24 Strategic Reconnaissance Squadron): attached 2 January 1951 – 15 June 1952, assigned 16 June 1952 – 25 January 1967; assigned 25 March 1967 – 7 July 1992
- 39th Bombardment Squadron: attached 2 January 1951 – 15 June 1952, assigned 16 June 1952 – 15 September 1963
- 40th Bombardment Squadron: attached 2 January 1951 – 15 June 1952, assigned 16 June 1952 – 25 January 1967
- 307th Air Refueling Squadron: attached c. 1 August 1951 – 16 June 1952
- 310th Air Refueling Squadron: 25 June 1965 – 25 January 1967
- 579th Strategic Missile Squadron: 1 September 1961 – 25 March 1965
- 4129th Combat Crew Training Squadron: 1 August 1959 – 15 September 1963

=== Stations ===
- Walker Air Force Base, New Mexico, 2 January 1951
- Eielson Air Force Base, Alaska, 25 March 1967 – 1 September 1992
- MacDill Air Force Base, Florida, 4 January 1994 – present

=== Aircraft and missiles ===
- Boeing B-29 Superfortress, 1951–1952
- Boeing KB-29 Superfortress, 1951–1952
- Convair B-36 Peacemaker, 1952–1957
- Boeing B-52 Stratofortress, 1957–1967
- SM-65F Atlas, 1962–1965
- Boeing KC-135 Stratotanker, 1958–1967, 1967–1992, 1996–present
- Boeing RC-135, 1967–1992
- Boeing TC-135, 1985–1992
- Boeing EC-135Y, 1997–2003
- Boeing CT-43 Bobcat, 1997–2001
- VC-37A Gulfstream V, 2001–2019

== See also ==
- List of B-29 units of the United States Air Force
- List of B-52 Units of the United States Air Force
