= Vosseler =

Vosseler is a surname. Notable people with the surname include:

- Hans Vosseler (b. 1949), German swimmer and Olympic medalist
- Heidi Vosseler (1918–1992), ballerina
- Heinrich Franz Vosseler (1885–1975), New Zealand engineer and oil refinery owner
- Mardee Vosseler (d. 1941), ballerina, sister of Heidi Vosseler
- Martin Vosseler, co-founder of Physicians for Social Responsibility
