= Ruth Draper =

American actress, dramatist and noted diseuse (1884–1956)

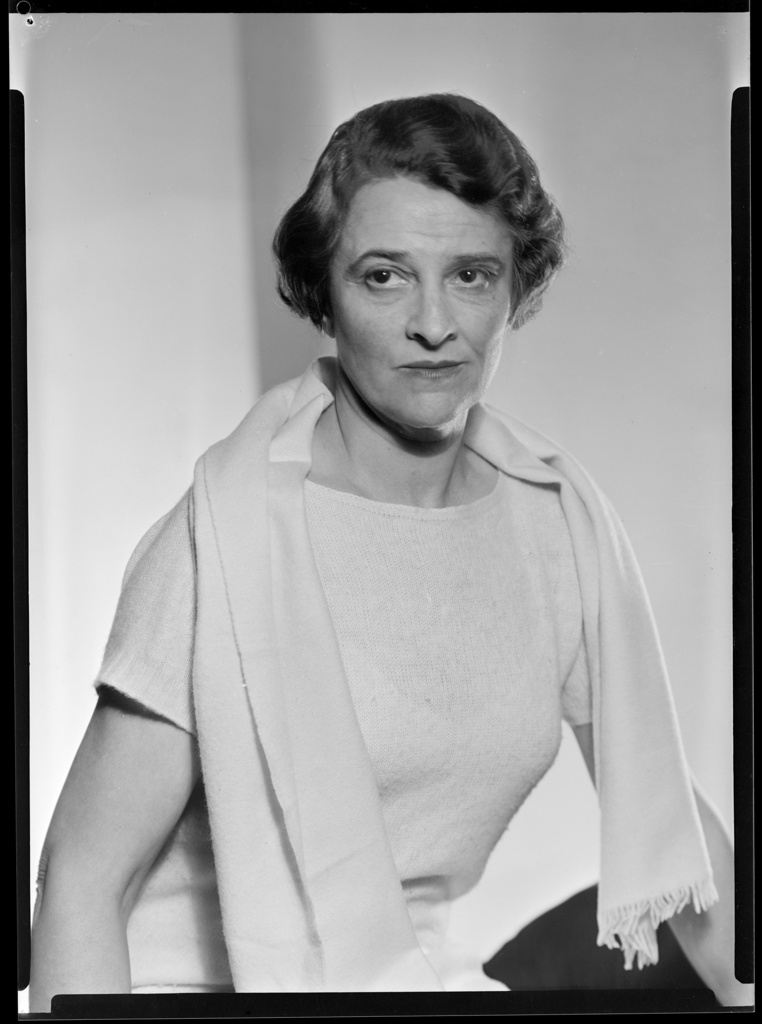
- Portrait of Ruth Draper, Sydney 1939
- Born: December 2, 1884; New York City, US
- Died: December 30, 1956 (aged 72); New York City, US
- Occupation: Stage actress
- Years active: 1916–1956

Ruth Draper (December 2, 1884 – December 30, 1956) was an American actress, dramatist and noted diseuse who specialized in character-driven monologues and monodrama. Her best-known pieces include The Italian Lesson, Three Women and Mr. Clifford, Doctors and Diets, and A Church in Italy.

== Early life and family ==
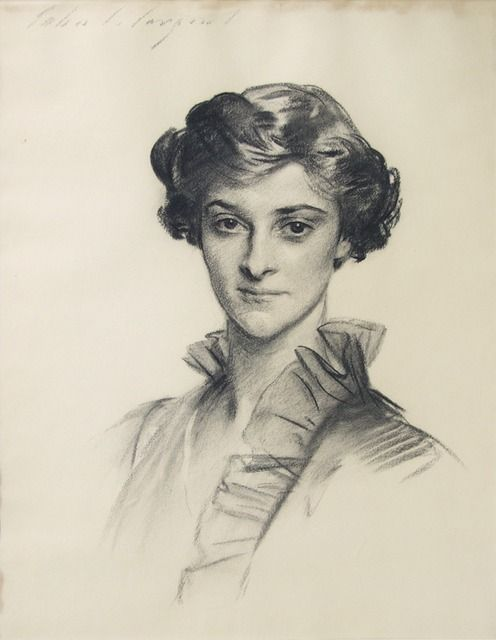
John-singer-sargent-portrait-of-ruth-draper

Ruth Draper was born in New York City, the youngest child of Dr. William Henry and Ruth (née Dana) Draper. Her father, who was born in Brattleboro, Vermont, had the affluence to support a large family with the help of several servants. Ruth Draper's mother, the daughter of Charles Anderson Dana, editor and publisher of The New York Sun, married Dr. Draper in 1878 some years after the death of his first wife, Lucy. Her nephew, Paul Draper, was a noted dancer and actor. Draper's second cousin was the society architect Paul Phipps, father of the British performer Joyce Grenfell. Her nephew Raimund Sanders Draper was a WWII pilot.

Draper came out as a debutante in 1902, and was active in the Junior League of the City of New York.

== Career ==
Ruth Draper's inspiration to become an actress came from the Polish pianist Ignacy Jan Paderewski, a friend of her family. She made her Broadway debut in the 1916 play A Lady's Name by Cyril Harcourt, and by 1921 was becoming well known as monologist, or more specifically a diseuse, appearing in monodramas.

Draper dominated the field of professional solo performance during the second quarter of the twentieth century, performing with great success throughout the United States and Europe. Draper's one-person shows differed in kind from the majority of the early lyceum and Chautauqua solo performers who preceded her, in that she portrayed original characters in her monologues/monodramas rather than drawing on selections from published literature.

With a chair, shawl, and occasional table as her only props, Draper entertained audiences worldwide in a half dozen languages for nearly forty years. Her best-known pieces include The Italian Lesson, Three Women and Mr. Clifford, Doctors and Diets, and A Church in Italy.

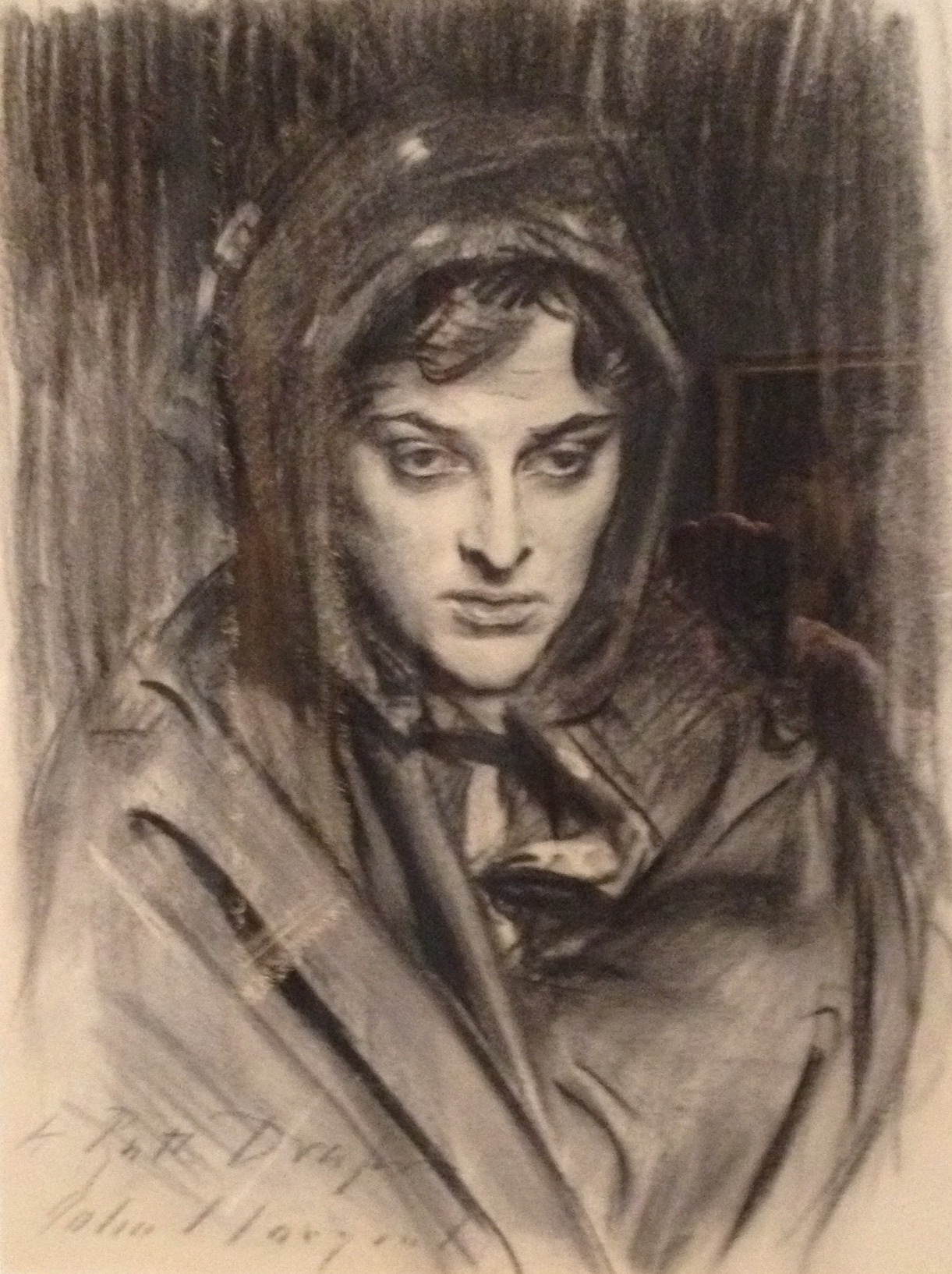
Ruth Draper as a Dalmatian Peasant by John Singer Sargent

Such theatre luminaries as Bernard Shaw, Thornton Wilder, John Gielgud, Katharine Hepburn, Maurice Chevalier, Laurence Olivier, and Uta Hagen were among those impressed by Draper's artistry and talent, as were the authors Henry James, Henry Adams, Edith Wharton, and Agatha Christie. Draper inspired characters in two of Christie's works: Carlotta Adams in the 1933 novel Lord Edgware Dies and Aspasia Glen in the short story "The Dead Harlequin". Christie wrote: "I thought how clever she was and how good her impersonations were; the wonderful way she could transform herself from a nagging wife to a peasant girl kneeling in a cathedral."

In 1951 King George VI awarded Draper honorary membership in the Order of the British Empire with the rank of Commander (CBE). On April 29, 1953, she had lunch with C. S. Lewis the day after he saw her performance at the New Theatre in Oxford. Nearly a quarter century earlier she gave a performance at Windsor Castle after an invitation from King George V and Queen Mary.

Draper had many relationships in Italy, in large part through her connection with Lauro De Bosis, a young Italian poet and writer who died in 1931 after a daring flight over Rome during which he threw thousands of leaflets denouncing Benito Mussolini and the National Fascist Party.

== Death ==
Ruth Draper died on December 30, 1956, of an apparent heart attack, just hours after giving a performance on Broadway at the Playhouse Theatre, the first frame of a scheduled four-week run. Draper's family had a summer home in Islesboro, Maine, which she purchased from her family and where she spent increasing amounts of time in her later years. A short biography of Draper is among several collected by the Anglo-Italian writer Iris Origo in her 1984 book, A Need to Testify.

== Awards and honors ==
In 2019, the "Complete Recorded Monologues, Ruth Draper (1954–1956)" was selected by the Library of Congress for preservation in the National Recording Registry for being "culturally, historically, or aesthetically significant".
