= MDP Wethersfield =

MDP Wethersfield
- IATA: ~~WXF~~; ICAO: EGVT

Summary
- Airport type: Military airfield, private airfield
- Owner: Ministry of Defence
- Operator: MoD Police
- Location: Finchingfield, Essex, England
- Elevation AMSL: 322 ft (98 m)
- Coordinates: 51°58′30″N 0°30′18″E

Map
- Location in Essex

Runways
Direction	Length		Surface
Direction	ft	m	Surface
10/28	9,053	2,759	Asphalt
04/22	4,068	1,240	Asphalt
15/33	4,429	1,350	Asphalt

MDP Wethersfield is a Ministry of Defence facility in Essex, England, located north of the village of Wethersfield, about 6 miles (9.7 km) north-west of the town of Braintree. Originally an RAF station, the site was later used as the headquarters and training centre of the Ministry of Defence Police until 2022. It now houses asylum seekers.

It started as RAF Wethersfield opening in 1944 and during World War II it was used by the Royal Air Force and United States Army Air Forces. It was closed in 1946, and was reopened in 1951 as a result of the Cold War. Used until 1970 as a United States Air Force fighter airfield, it was held as a reserve airfield until 1993, when it came under control of the Ministry of Defence Police.

== History ==
=== Use by the USAAF ===
RAF Wethersfield was allocated by the RAF to the United States Army Air Forces Ninth Air Force in August 1942. For security reasons, it was known as USAAF Station AAF-170 rather than its location during the war. Its station ID was "WF" but it was still RAF Wethersfield.

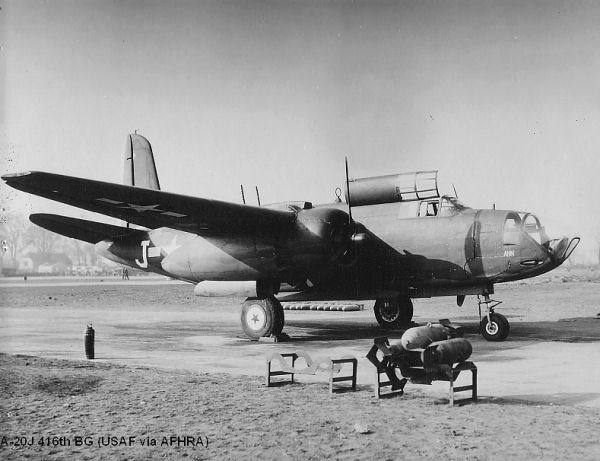
Douglas A-20J of the 416th Bomb Group – RAF Wethersfield, 1944

==== 416th Bombardment Group (light) ====
The 416th Bombardment Group (light) arrived from Laurel Army Airfield, Mississippi, USA on 1 February 1944, flying the twin-engine Douglas A-20G "Havoc" aircraft. Its operational squadrons and fuselage codes were:

- 668th Bombardment Squadron (5H)
- 669th Bombardment Squadron (2A)
- 670th Bombardment Squadron (F6)
- 671st Bombardment Squadron (5C)

Following the D-day landings, on 21 September 1944 the 416th moved to their Advanced Landing Ground at Melun/Villaroche France (A-55).

=== Use by the RAF Bomber Command ===

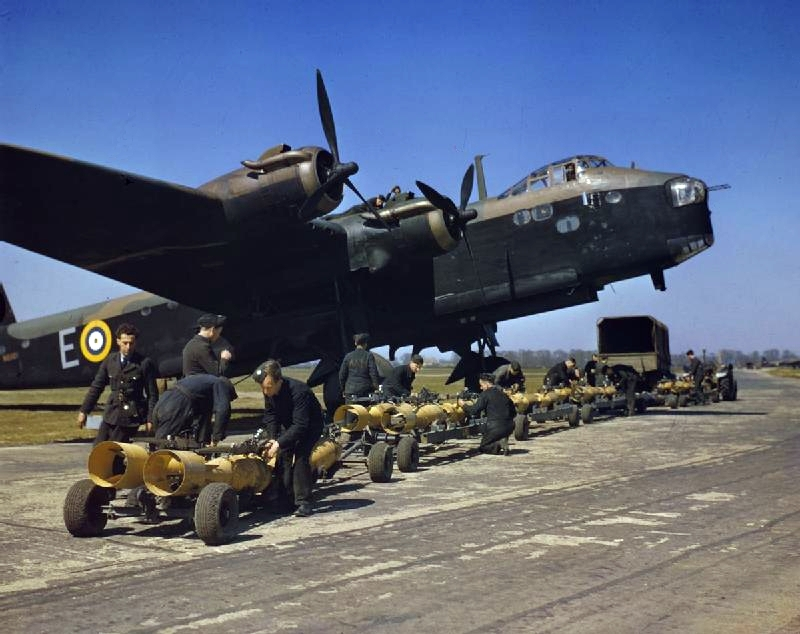
RAF Short Stirling bomber, with 250lb bomb train, 1942

Soon after the Americans departed for France, Wethersfield was returned to RAF control, being used by 38 Group, RAF Bomber Command.

- No. 196 Squadron RAF between 9 October 1944 and 26 January 1945 with the Short Stirling IV
- No. 299 Squadron RAF between 9 October 1944 and 25 January 1945 with the Short Stirling IV
- No. 15 Flying Training School RAF between February and May 1952
- No. 611 Volunteer Gliding School RAF between January 1996 and April 1996
- No. 1385 (Heavy Transport Support) Conversion Unit RAF between April and July 1946
- No. 1677 (Target Towing) Flight RAF between December 1944 and January 1945
- Operational and Refresher Training Unit RAF between October 1945 and April 1946

During the late 1940s the base was used as a winter camping ground for Chipperfield's Circus. Elephants were housed in the maintenance hangars and the huts became homes for other circus animals.

=== Use by the USAF ===
==== 20th Fighter Bomber / Tactical Fighter Wing ====
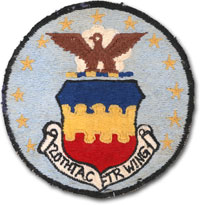

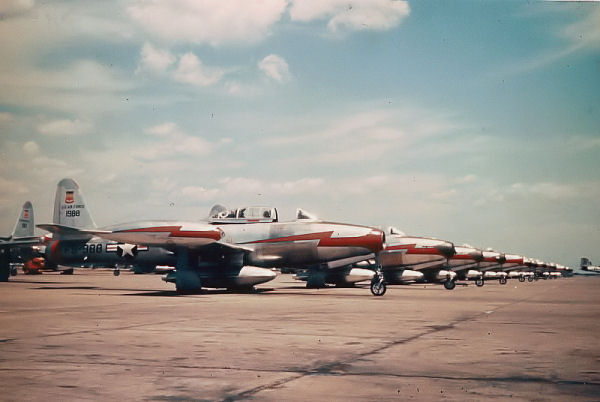
Republic F-84Gs of the 77th Fighter-Bomber Squadron – 1952. (F-84G Thunderjet serial 51-988 nearest).

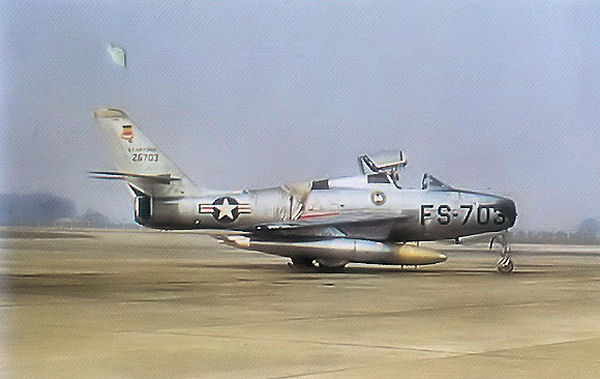
Republic F-84F Thunderstreak, serial 52-6703 of the 55th Fighter-Bomber Squadron, circa 1956.

In 1951, as a result of the Cold War threat of the Soviet Union, the British provided RAF Wethersfield to the USAF as part of their NATO commitment. Work on upgrading the facilities at Wethersfield commenced that same year. The United States was rapidly expanding its air force, increasing the number of combat wings from 48 in 1950 to 95 by June 1952. The 20th Fighter-Bomber Wing was transferred from Langley AFB in Virginia, USA and took up residence at RAF Wethersfield on 31 May 1952.

The transfer was intended to address the defence problem posed by Soviet conventional superiority in Western Europe. The 20th FBW consisted of three operational squadrons: the 55th, 77th, and 79th Fighter-Bomber Squadrons, flying the F-84G "Thunderjets". The F-84Gs were specially equipped to carry small nuclear bombs, and could deliver these weapons on Soviet forces if they invaded West Germany. Due to restricted space at Wethersfield, the 79th Squadron was initially stationed at RAF Bentwaters from 6 June 1952, then at RAF Woodbridge, 3 mi (4.8 km) southeast of Bentwaters, from 1 October 1954.

RAF Woodbridge was operated as a detachment of the 20th FBW until 8 July 1958, when the 20th FBW/TFW handed over control to the 81st Tactical Fighter Wing. The 79th TFS remained at the base under the control of the 20th TFW until 1970.

In June 1955 the 20th FBW started receiving the F-84F Thunderstreak in addition to its F-84Ds and F-84Gs. The F-84G was phased out by June 1955, with the aircraft being transferred to Allied nations in Europe and the Middle East. The 20th flew the F-84F until 16 June 1957 when the conversion to the North American F-100D and F-100F "Super Sabres" began. The F-100 remained the primary aircraft at RAF Wethersfield until 1970.

The 20th Fighter Bomber Wing established an operational detachment at Wheelus AB, Libya, in February 1958. This detachment managed the USAFE Weapons Training Center for month-long squadron rotations by the Europe-based USAFE tactical fighter wings.

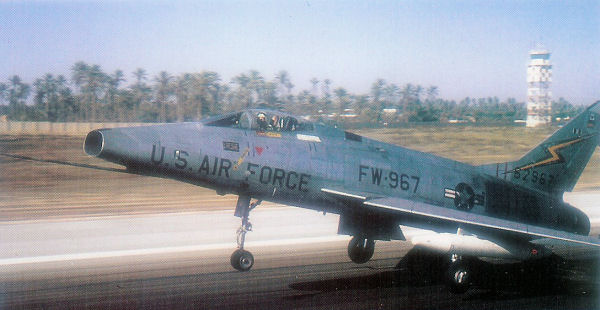
A 20th TFW F-100D unsticks from Wheelus Air Base, Libya

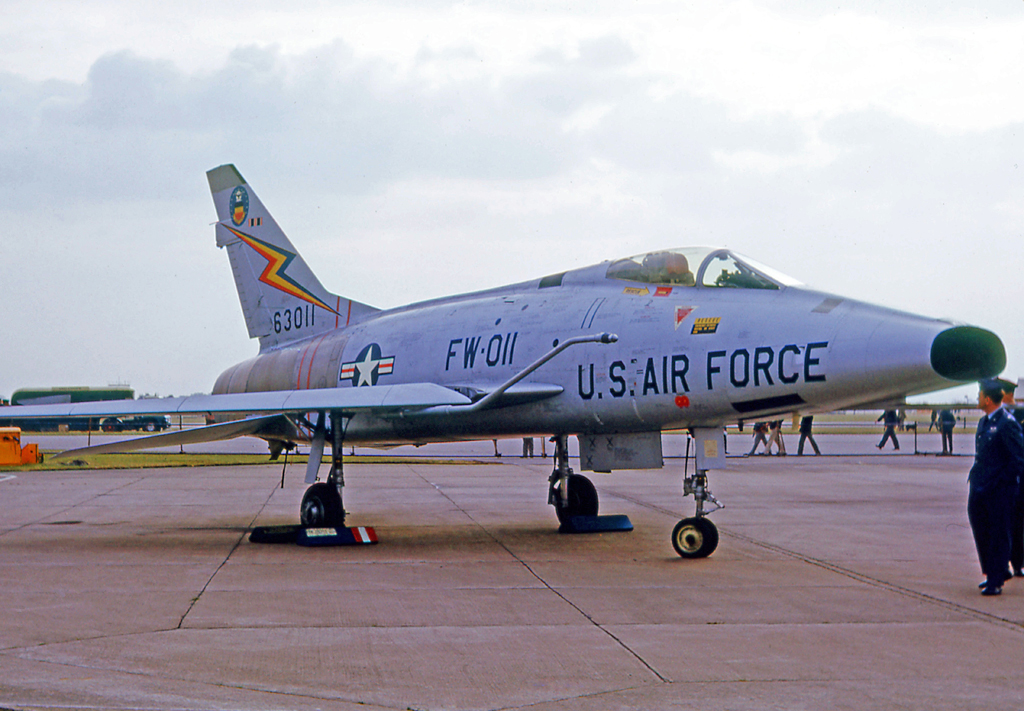
F-100D Super Sabre of 20 TFW in 1964 showing unit markings

The 20th began realigning its units 15 March 1957 as part of an Air Force worldwide reorganization. Combat groups were inactivated, assigning the unit's fighter mission to the wing. As part of another organization change, the 20th dropped the "Fighter Bomber" designation on 8 July 1958, becoming the 20th Tactical Fighter Wing. The three flying units also changed designation, becoming tactical fighter squadrons. The flying squadrons were dispersed on a monthly rotational basis to RAF Alconbury, RAF Woodbridge and Nouasseur AB, Morocco, due to runway repairs at Wethersfield from May to August 1958.

Starting in July 1966, bases in Turkey, Spain, and Italy were transferred from Tactical Air Command to USAFE. USAFE was responsible for deploying fighter squadrons to these bases. The 20th began monthly rotations of its fighter squadrons to Cigli AB, Turkey, starting in July 1966. Rotations to Aviano AB, Italy, began in December 1966. Rotations to Zaragoza AB, Spain, began in January 1970. Rotations to all these bases continued until June 1970.

The closure of US bases in France forced the opening of RAF Greenham Common under 20th TFW management to handle personnel overflow beginning in January 1967. A military coup in Libya forced the closure of the range at Wheelus AB in September 1969 and the closure of the 20th TFW's detachment in Libya. The range was relocated to Torrejon AB, Spain, in November 1969. On 10 December 1969, Detachment 1, 20th Tactical Fighter Wing was established at RAF Upper Heyford as part of congressional budget cutbacks and a USAFE-wide base realignment and consolidation of units. RAF Wethersfield had a limited potential for development and was close to the expanding London Stansted Airport.

The fighter squadrons of the 20th had been in constant rotation since the arrival of the wing at Wethersfield in 1952. As part of budget reductions and to consolidate all of the wing's elements at a larger facility, the 20th Tactical Fighter Wing was relocated from Wethersfield to RAF Upper Heyford, replacing and absorbing the 66th Tactical Reconnaissance Wing, which had relocated from Laon AB, France, to the UK on 1 June 1970. The aging 1950s-era F-100s of the 20th TFW and RF-101 "Voodoos" of the 66th TRW were retired, and were replaced by the General Dynamics F-111E Fighter-Bomber at RAF Upper Heyford.

==== 66th Combat Support Squadron ====
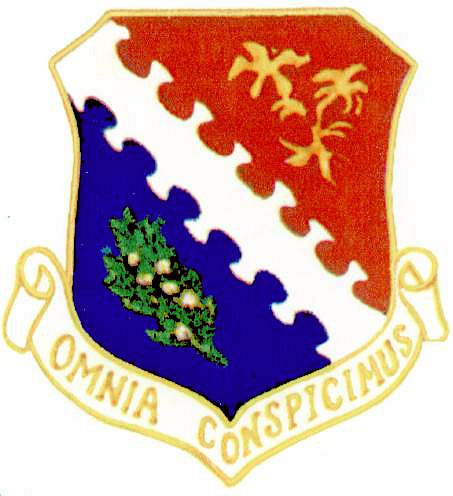

The 66th Tactical Reconnaissance Wing at RAF Upper Heyford was inactivated and elements were moved to RAF Wethersfield. As a result, became a Dispersed Operations Base until September 1970, when the airfield mission was changed to that of Standby Deployment Base, ready to support augmentation forces if directed. In October 1970, elements, primarily Civil Engineering, of the inactivated 66th TRW were moved to RAF Wethersfield, being designated the 66th Combat Support Group. The group was again re-designated 66th Combat Support Squadron and became the host unit at RAF Wethersfield. The 66th CSS performed whatever duties were necessary to keep the airfield in a usable, operational state. On 1 June 1985 the 66th was reactivated as the 66th Electronic Combat Wing at Sembach AB, West Germany.

==== 10th Tactical Reconnaissance Wing ====
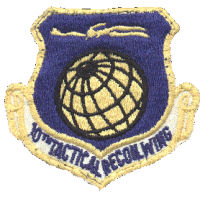

In August 1976 the 66th CSS became Detachment 1, 10th Tactical Reconnaissance Wing (TRW), based at RAF Alconbury. Under the 10th TRW, the station became a satellite of RAF Alconbury, storing much of the 10th TRW's War Reserve Material assets in its hangars. In addition, the 10th TRW supported a number of units including the 819th Civil Engineering Squadron Heavy Repair (CESHR) and Det. 1 2166th Information Systems Squadron (later redesignated Det. 1 2166th Communications Squadron).

==== 819th RED HORSE SQUADRON ====
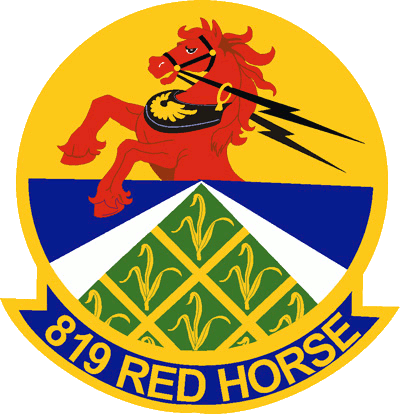

In 1978 the British and American Governments agreed to establish a Rapid Engineer Deployable Heavy Operational Repair Squadron Engineers (RED HORSE) unit in the UK. The main RED HORSE Civil Engineering unit established in December 1978 was the 819th CES. The 7119th Air Base Flight, later designated the 7119th Support Group, was established to manage the personnel and organisational issues for units at RAF Wethersfield. The 819th was tasked with rapid runway repair responsibilities for US Air Forces in Europe, along with its usual heavy repair role.

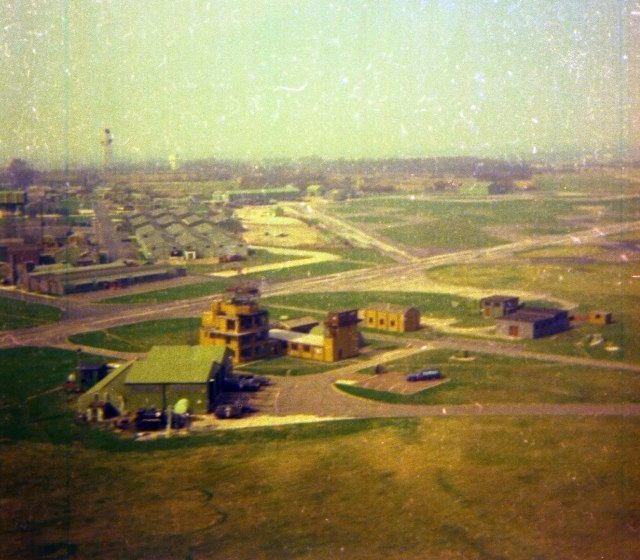
RAF Wethersfield, circa 1979

As the American involvement in the Vietnam War wound down, the role of RED HORSE units in peacetime came into question. As the need still existed for a quick-acting heavy repair force integral to the USAF Air Force and responsive to USAF commanders, a variety of training programs were developed, including civil engineering projects to develop skills similar to those required during a contingency. In 1980 members of the 819th removed and re-installed seven bells and a bell cage in an 11th-century church in Finchingfield, Essex. The goodwill generated in the village, located a mile from RAF Wethersfield, resulted in enhanced housing and community support for USAF personnel. Also, in 1980, the 7th Special Operations Squadron was deployed here for a week-long exercise with its MC-130E aircraft.

The 819th, along with the 2166th Communications Squadron, were the main units at Wethersfeld until the USAF returned the base to the British in 1990 due to budget cutbacks. The 819th was inactivated in February, while the 2166th remained active until June 1992. The base was handed back to the Royal Air Force at a ceremony on 3 July 1990 and Wethersfield was once again placed under care and maintenance status. The USAF retained a small Military Family Housing area at Wethersfield, in which American personnel assigned to RAF Molesworth, RAF Alconbury, and RAF Upwood lived.

== Past usage ==
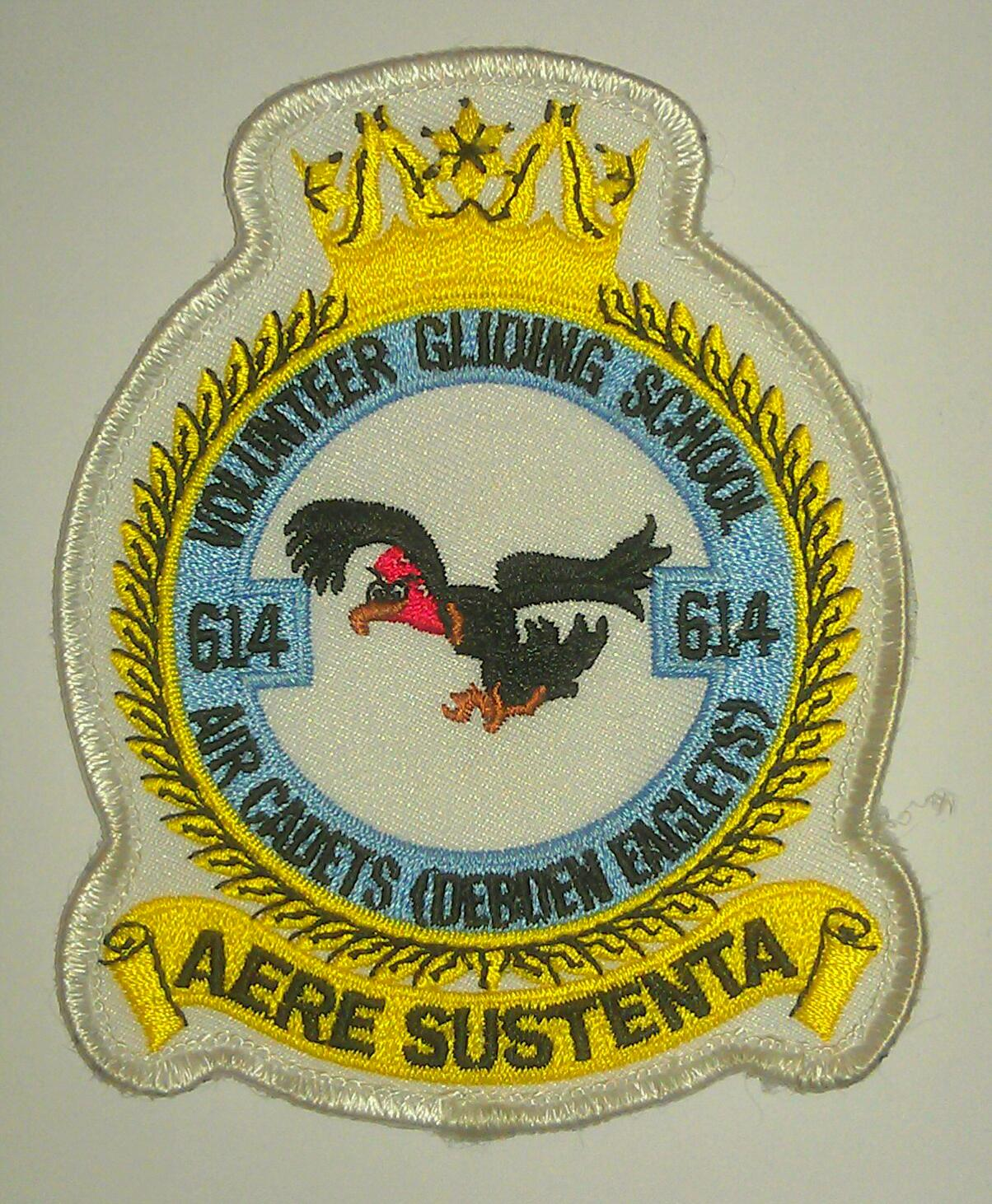

On 6 June 1982 No. 614 Volunteer Gliding Squadron RAF moved to MDP Wethersfield from RAF Debden, as that base was required for tank training. The squadron operated Grob Viking TX.1 gliders, maintaining a fleet of between six and eleven. The squadron's headquarters was in one of the two remaining T2 hangars. The gliders were used to provide members of the Royal Air Force Air Cadets with gliding experience. Gliding scholarships and advanced glider training were available. In addition to the gliders, the squadron operated four Land Rover Defenders, a Lamborghini tractor, and two Van Gelder six drum trailer type winches. The squadron consisted of 40 to 60 personnel who annually conducted around 6,000 launches, producing more than 800 hours of air time. In 2018 614 VGS moved to Robertson Barracks (formerly RAF Swanton Morley), marking the cessation of all flying activities at Wethersfield.

In April 1991, the Chief Constable of the Ministry of Defence Police (MDP) assumed responsibility for the site. A small, joint civilian-uniformed team was established to oversee the refurbishment of a number of buildings to prepare for the relocation of the Ministry of Defence Police Training School and Firearms Training Wing from Medmenham, Buckinghamshire, and the headquarters from Earl's Court in London by March 1993. The Training Centres commenced operation on 1 April 1993.

The Operational Support Unit moved to Wethersfield from RAF Wittering and has been permanently based there since May 1992. In addition, Wethersfield was to be the home for the MOD Guard Service (MGS) Training School. The move in October 1994 of the MDP training and headquarters, along with the MGS Training Wing, gave the Force its first combined HQ and Training Centre.

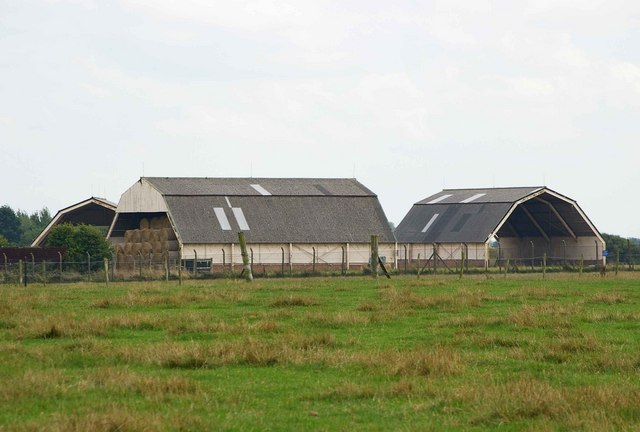
Hangars at MDPGA Wethersfield

Gardiner Associates, a fire investigation training provider, began providing residential fire investigation training courses for police, fire and forensic science practitioners at MDP Wethersfield in 1998. Millbrook Engineering uses Wethersfield as its "Extreme Manoeuvre Facility", which they describe as a "high security location for extreme dynamics evaluation and driver training with the world's largest on and off-road vehicles."

All three wartime-era runways and connecting taxiways, as well as many wartime loop-type dispersal hardstands, remain in good condition. The post-war jet runway laid down for USAF fighters during the 1950s and 1960s is still intact. The large main hangar, used by the USAF until the facility was closed, is well maintained, as are numerous buildings and Nissen huts used by the MOD Police.

In late March 2016, the Ministry of Defence announced that the site was one of ten to be sold in order to reduce the size of the Defence estate. The disposal date was later extended to 2025.

== Recent history ==
Project Jute saw the Ministry of Defence Police relocate its headquarters from MDP Wethersfield to RAF Wyton in 2022.

In April 2023 the Home Office announced that it was working on proposals to use a number of military bases, including the Wethersfield site, to house asylum seekers. In August 2023 the former UK Home Secretary Priti Patel accused the government of being "secretive and evasive" about details of their plans to use Wethersfield to house asylum seekers.

The first migrants arrived at the base in July 2023, and by December the number had risen to approx 600. In July 2025, the Home Office confirmed that Wethersfield now regularly housed just under 800 migrants, with a further 445 contingency bed spaces "which can be brought into use to help manage short-term pressures across the wider asylum accommodation estate".

== See also ==
- List of Royal Air Force stations
