= Muriel Draper =

American writer, artist and social activist (d. 1952)

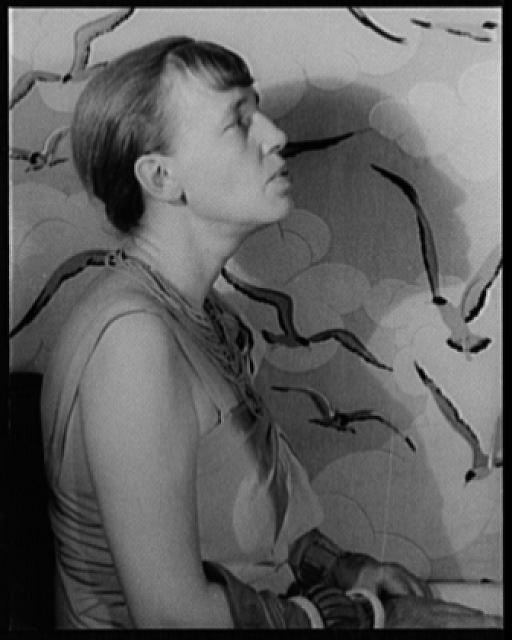
- Muriel Draper (1934). Photo by Carl Van Vechten
- Born: 1886
- Died: 1952
- Occupation(s): writer, artist, social activist
- Spouse: Paul Draper
- Children: Raimund Sanders Draper; Paul Draper

Muriel Draper (November 13, 1886 – August 26, 1952) was an American writer, artist and social activist.

== Biography ==
Moving in English and American art circles, she participated in the Harlem Renaissance. A follower of Russian mystic G. I. Gurdjieff, she participated in A.R. Orage's group, based on Gurdjieff's teachings, and collaborated with other followers, including poet Jean Toomer. In 1929 she published her major work Music at Midnight, for which she became widely known.

After a trip to the Soviet Union in 1934, she became more engaged in progressive politics.She also visited Spain during the Civil War and later raised funds for the loyalists in New York. From 1937-1938, she hosted the radio program, "It's a Woman's World," where she discussed world politics and art, including the musical, The Cradle Will Rock by Marc Blitzstein. She was an activist for peace, US-Soviet friendship, women's rights, civil rights, and civil liberties.

In 1949, she was investigated by the House Un-American Activities Committee but defiantly continued her activism, giving speeches at a meeting of the Women's International Democratic Federation in Moscow and a Women's Conference for Peace in New York later that year. Her papers are stored at Yale University. She was a member of the Women's International Democratic Federation and its American affiliate the Congress of American Women of which she was president in 1949. She was a founding member of the National Council of American-Soviet Friendship, Chair of the Women's Committee and later its Executive Secretary. Her son, choreographer Paul Draper, was blacklisted for a time due to his mother's affiliations. Muriel's other son, Raimund Sanders Draper, died as a member of the Royal Air Force in World War II.
