= No. 614 Volunteer Gliding Squadron RAF =

Volunteer gliding squadron of the Royal Air Force

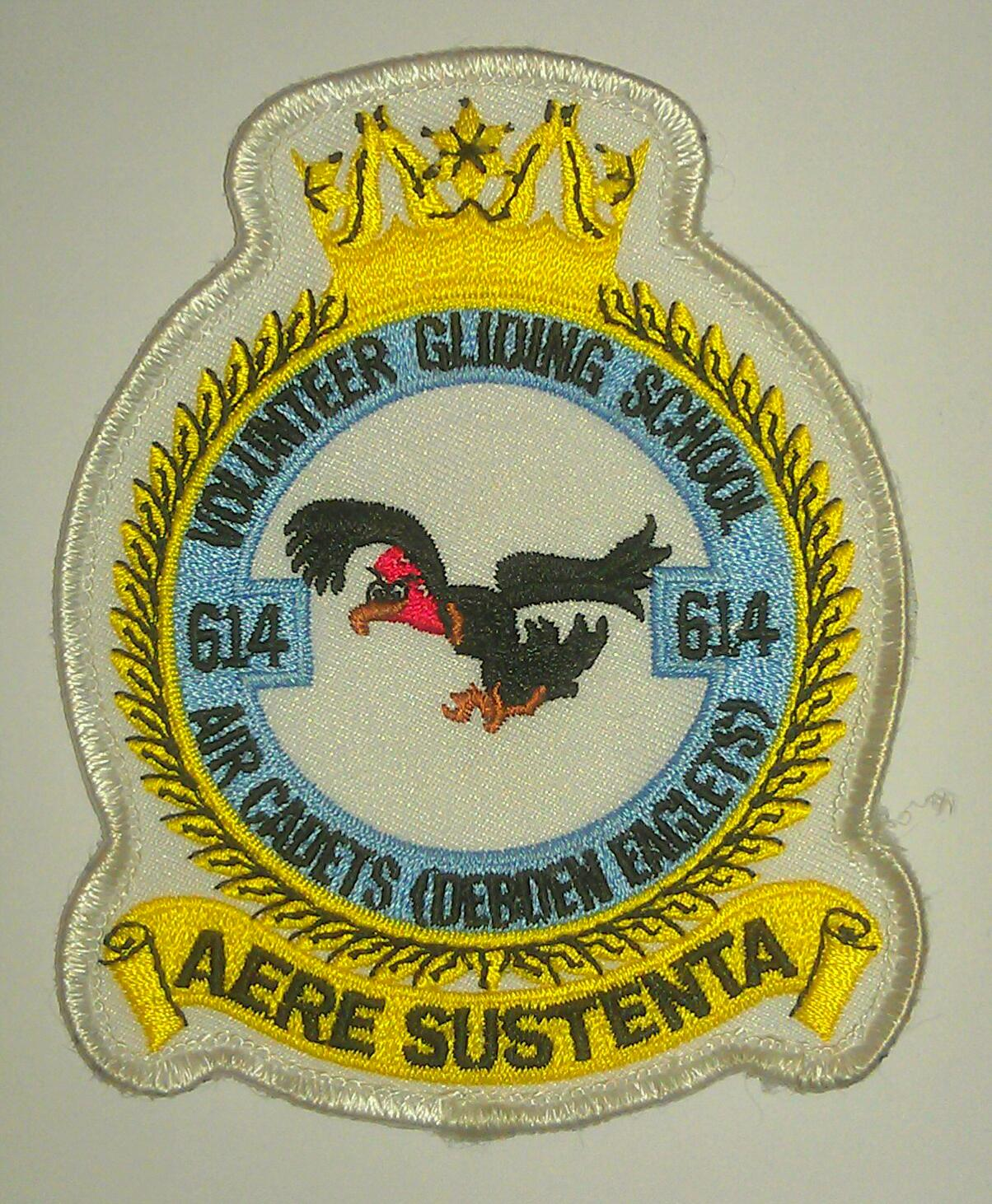
- Active: 194?–present
- Country: United Kingdom
- Branch: Royal Air Force
- Role: Gliding training
- Part of: No. 2 Flying Training School RAF
- Garrison/HQ: Robertson Barracks, Swanton Morley
- Mottos: Aere Sustenta ("Air sustains us")
- Equipment: Grob Viking TX.1

Insignia
- Identification symbol: Goonie Bird

614 VGS is a former Volunteer Gliding Squadron. One of 27 Volunteer Gliding Squadrons, it was made up of between 40 and 60 personnel who annually conducted around 6,000 launches, producing more than 800 hours airborne. The squadron was operating under No.2 Flying Training School, within No.22 (Training) Group of RAF Air Command.

== Pre 614 Gliding School 1946–1955 ==
No. 614 VGS is the natural descendant of three Gliding Schools, Nos 142, 146, and 147. These schools were formed in the early days of Air Training Corps gliding, and have seen the transition from single-seater primary gliders to two-seater soaring.

=== 142 Gliding School ===
142 Gliding School was formed at Bulphun in 1942.

Between August 1950 and 1 August 1953 No 142 Gliding School was based at RAF Hendon.

On 1 August 1953 No 142 Gliding School moved to RAF Hornchurch where it was based until 1 September 1955.

=== 146 Gliding School ===
146 Gliding School was formed at Shenfield.

No 146 Gliding School (17 August 1946 – 1 September 1955) at RAF Hornchurch.

Early in the 1950s 146 Gliding School received some staff members from the closure of 141 Gliding School.

=== 147 Gliding School ===
147 Gliding School was formed at Willingale.

=== Mergers ===
The first merger took place at Fairlop between 142 and 146, and after a move to Hornchurch a further merger took place with 147. It was at Hornchurch that the best achievements of the schools took place, due in great measure to the help and assistance given to the school by the regular Air Force staff, culminating in the appointment of Group Captain Dennison, commanding officer of the station, as an established member of the school instructional staff.

The early post-war period saw instruction training in Germany by the cream of German gliding instruction, courses at sites such as Dunstable and Great Hucklow, and entries by school instructors into the National Championships where they showed club pilots the skill of ATC instructors in ordinary training machines.

Three Silver C's have been gained by school instructors and many Silver C legs. The outstanding Gold C by Flt Lt W Verling in an open cockpit Slingsby Prefect was not only unique in the ATC gliding movement but in British gliding generally.

Due to its proximity to London, the school often become the show school and flew many VIPs. Later its pilots performed show aerobatics at many air displays including the Battle of Britain show at Biggin Hill.

== 614 Gliding School, 1955–1982 ==
=== RAF Hornchurch 1955–1962 ===
614 Gliding School was officially formed on 1 September 1955 at RAF Hornchurch.

In 1962 the RAF sold the famous aerodrome at Hornchurch and this resulted in 614 Gliding Squadron moving to RAF North Weald.

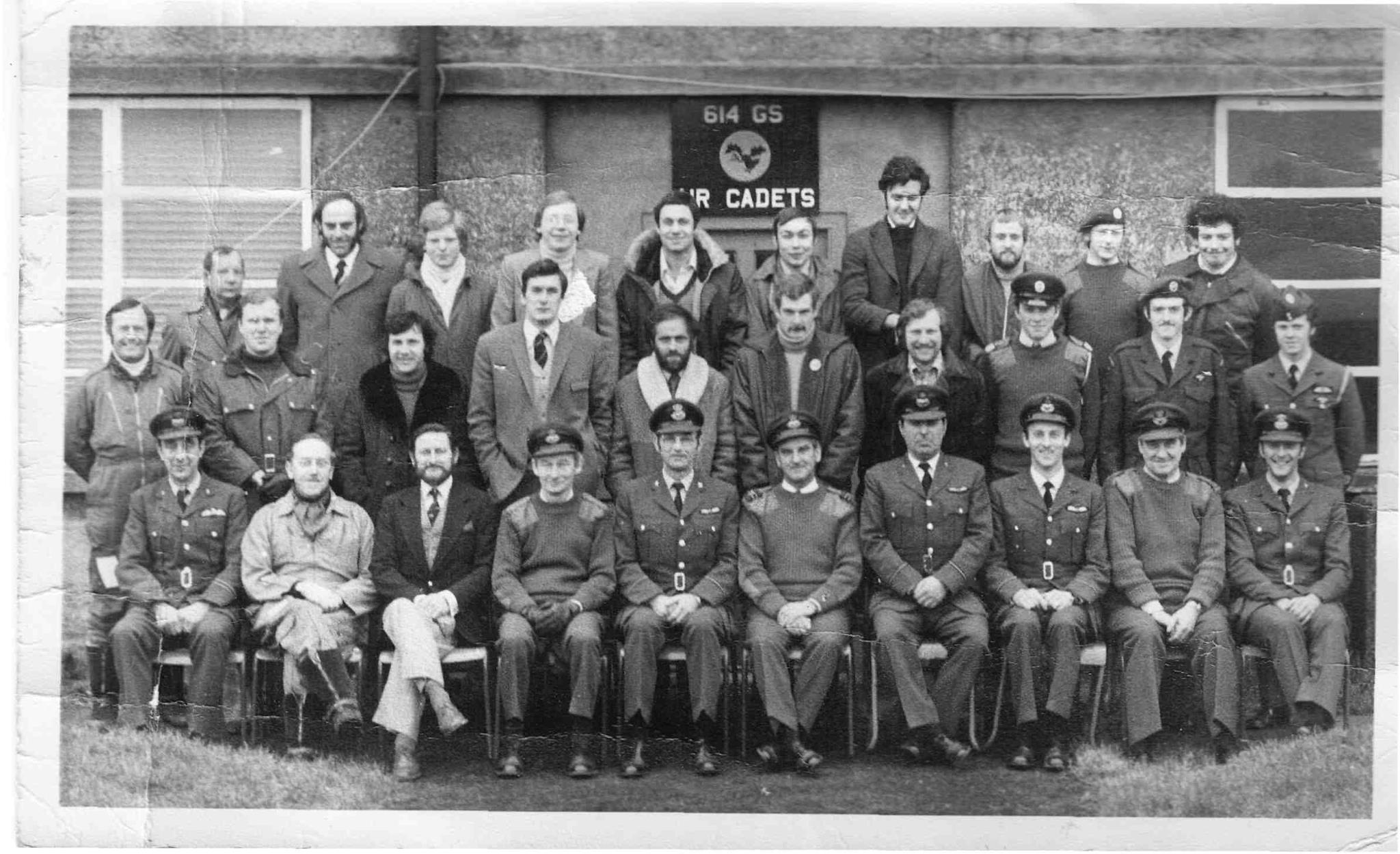
614 GS Annual General Meeting outside Hangar No.3 at RAF Debden on 4 January 1976

=== RAF North Weald 1962–1965 ===
614 Gliding School moved to RAF North Weald on 1 February 1962.

RAF North Weald was transferred to the Army on ????, this caused 614 Gliding School to be moved to RAF Debden.

=== RAF Debden 1965–1982 ===
In 1974 the RAF left Debden and the base was transferred to the control of the Army in 1975 and the site was renamed Carver Barracks.

In 1978 Gliding Schools were re-designated as Volunteer Gliding Schools, creating the acronym VGS.

It was during the squadron's time at RAF Debden that they gained their name "Debden Eaglets".

The school remained at RAF Debden until 1982, when the Army required the airfield for tank training, and the school was found a new home at RAF Wethersfield, where the school opened for operations on 6 June 1982.

== Wethersfield 1982–2018 ==
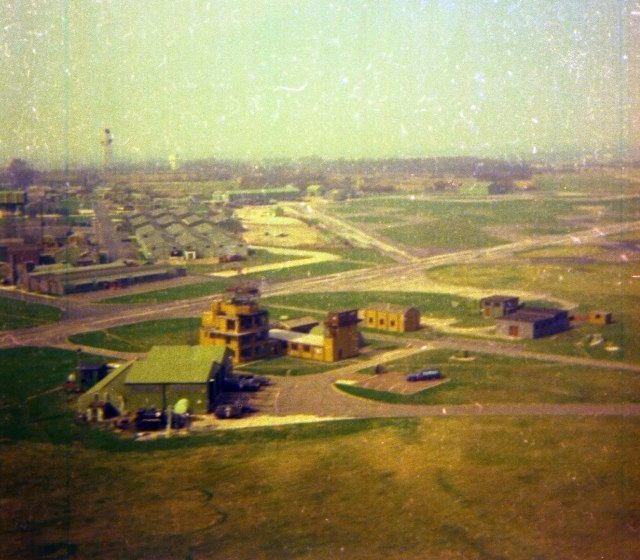
RAF Wethersfield in 1979, 3 years before 614 VGS moved to the base

=== RAF Wethersfield 1982–1992 ===
614 Volunteer Gliding School officially took up residence at RAF Wethersfield on 6 June 1982. USAF units were still in residence at the base at this time.

On moving to the base the school's HQ was originally set up within two Nissen huts at the east end of the airfield along with a Bessonneau hangar to store the school's gliders.

During 1984 the school was re-equipped with the Grob Viking TX.1, replacing their wood and canvas gliders which was in line with the rest of the Volunteer Gliding Squadron organisation.

In 19?? due to flooding problems in the Bessonneau hangar a concrete base was laid.

=== MDPGA Wethersfield 1992–2018 ===
During 1992 the Wethersfield was handed back to MOD Estates by the USAF. Over the next few years the Ministry of Defence Police moved units onto the base until it became their HQ; this resulted in the base being renamed to MDPGA Wethersfield.

Also in 1992 Squadron Leader Terry Horsley took over as OC 614 Volunteer Gliding School and the school moved out of the Bessonneau hangar and into the far more spacious T2 hangar, which continues as the school's HQ to this day.

In 1995 the school moved out of the Nissen huts that they had been based in since moving to Wethersfield and into 4 Portacabins inside the T2 hangar; these are currently split, with two being used for accommodation and two being used for offices, briefing rooms, stores and to provide the school with a kitchen area.

In 2005, following a decision by the Royal Air Force Board, the VGSs were renamed Volunteer Gliding Squadrons, keeping their VGS acronym.

Robertson Barracks, Swanton Morley 2018 - 2022

Following the announcement of the planned closure of MDPGA Wethersfield, a new home was required for 614 VGS. This was found at the former RAF Swanton Morley, now Robertson Barracks, near East Dereham in Norfolk, despite it being due to close earlier than MDPGA Wethersfield.

The airfield was not suitable, in its present state, for gliding operations, so the squadron concentrated on delivering Part Task Trainer (PTT) coursed using the Viking PTT in conjunction with 611 AGS with their Vigilant PTT. These were delivered to cadets from all across the Eastern region, comprising the catchment areas of both 614 VGS, and the recently disbanded 611 VGS, using instructors from both units. These courses were delivered as part of the Progressive Aviation Training Syllabus, at weekends, and during week nights for the more local cadets.

These courses were paused as part of the COVID19 lockdowns in 2020, and with the planned closure of Robertson Barracks in 2025, this was never a solution. A further move was now required, and after investigating the feasibility of many local sites, the move to RAF Honington was announced. The squadron commenced this move in mid 2022.

== 614 Squadron 2006 – 2016 ==
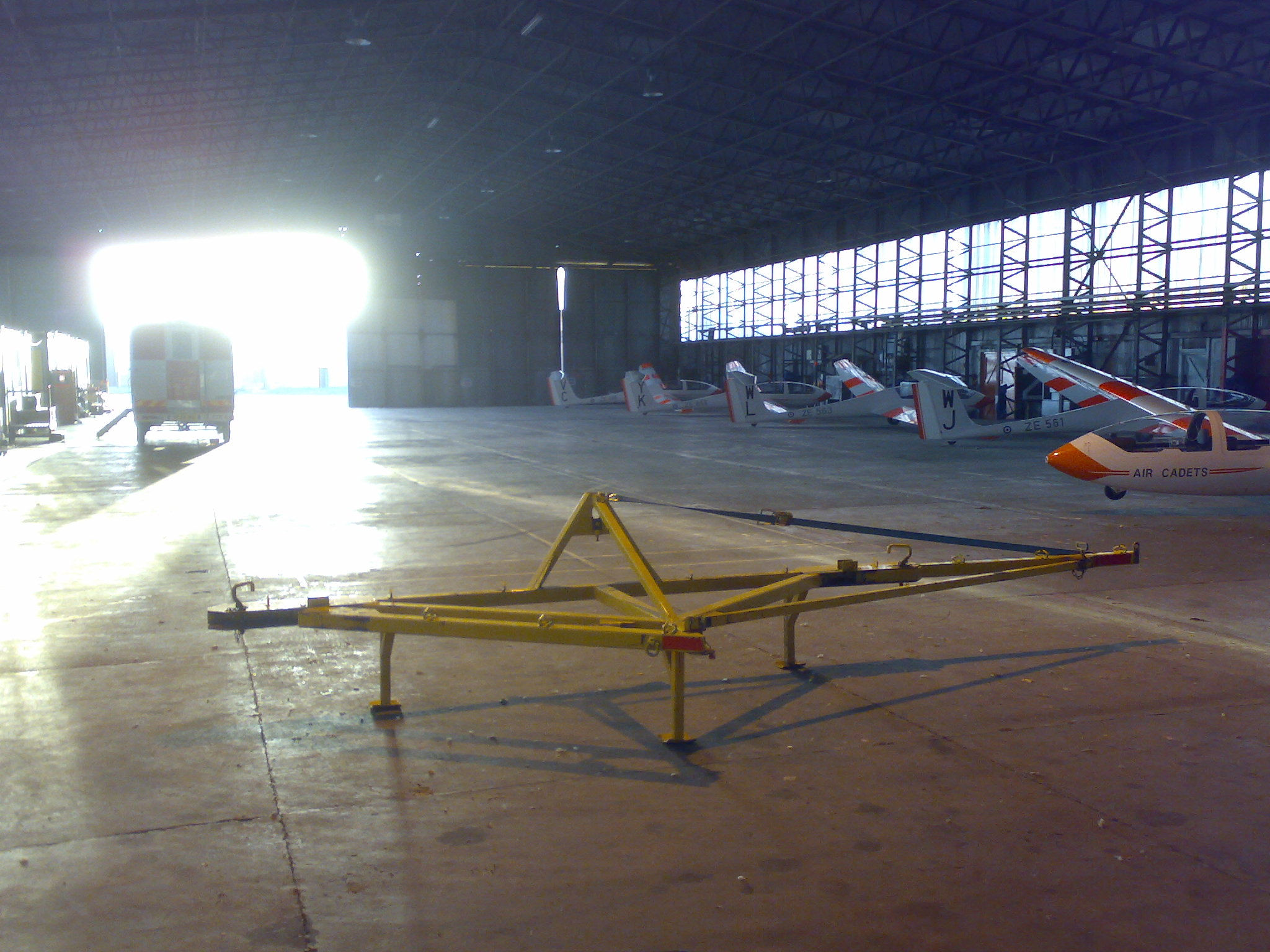
Interior of Building 161 and Tractor Boom at MDPGA Wethersfield on 13 May 2007

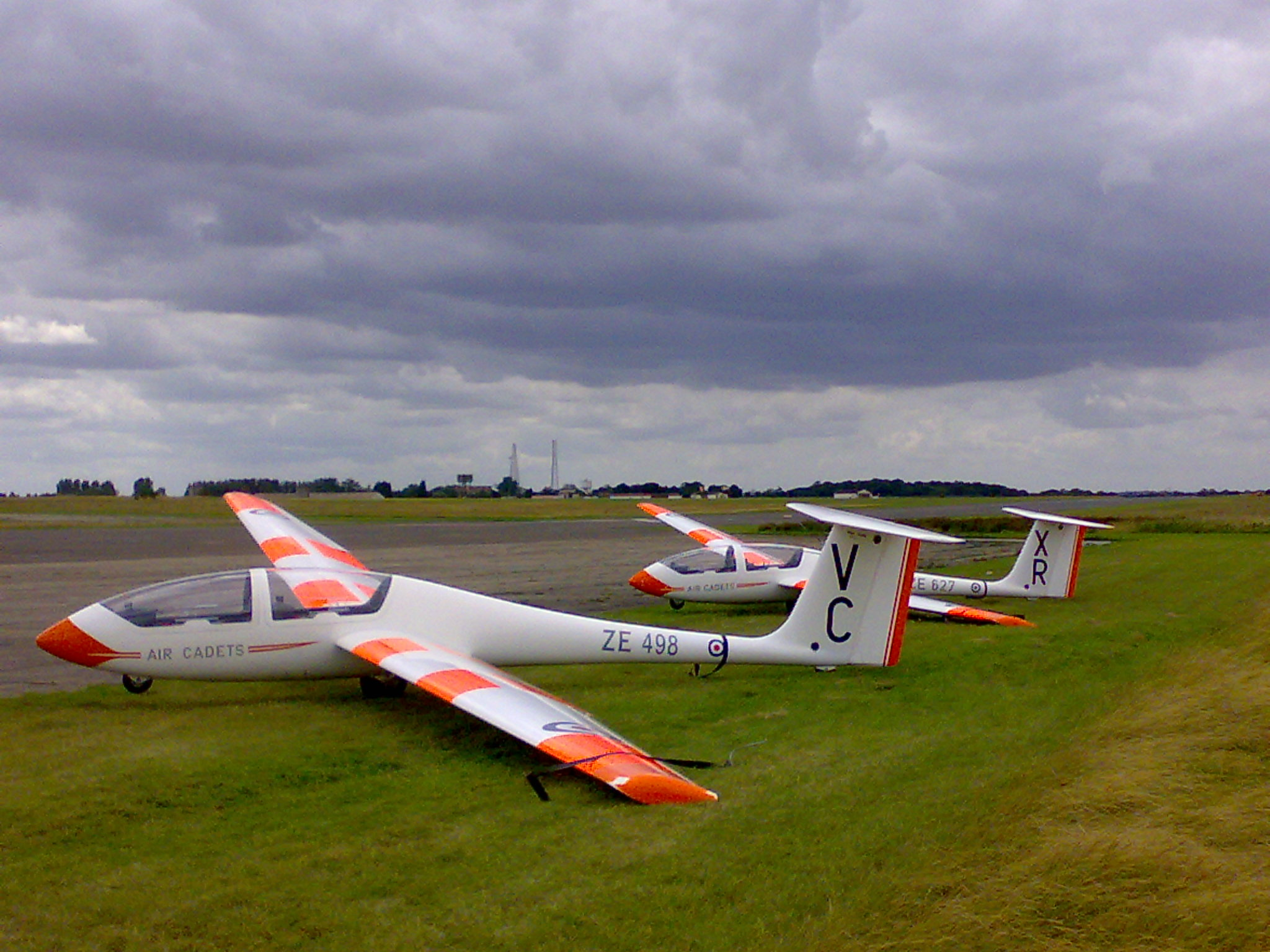
Vikings ZE498 (VC) and ZE627 (XR) picketed at MDPGA Wethersfield on Runway 28 on 27 July 2007

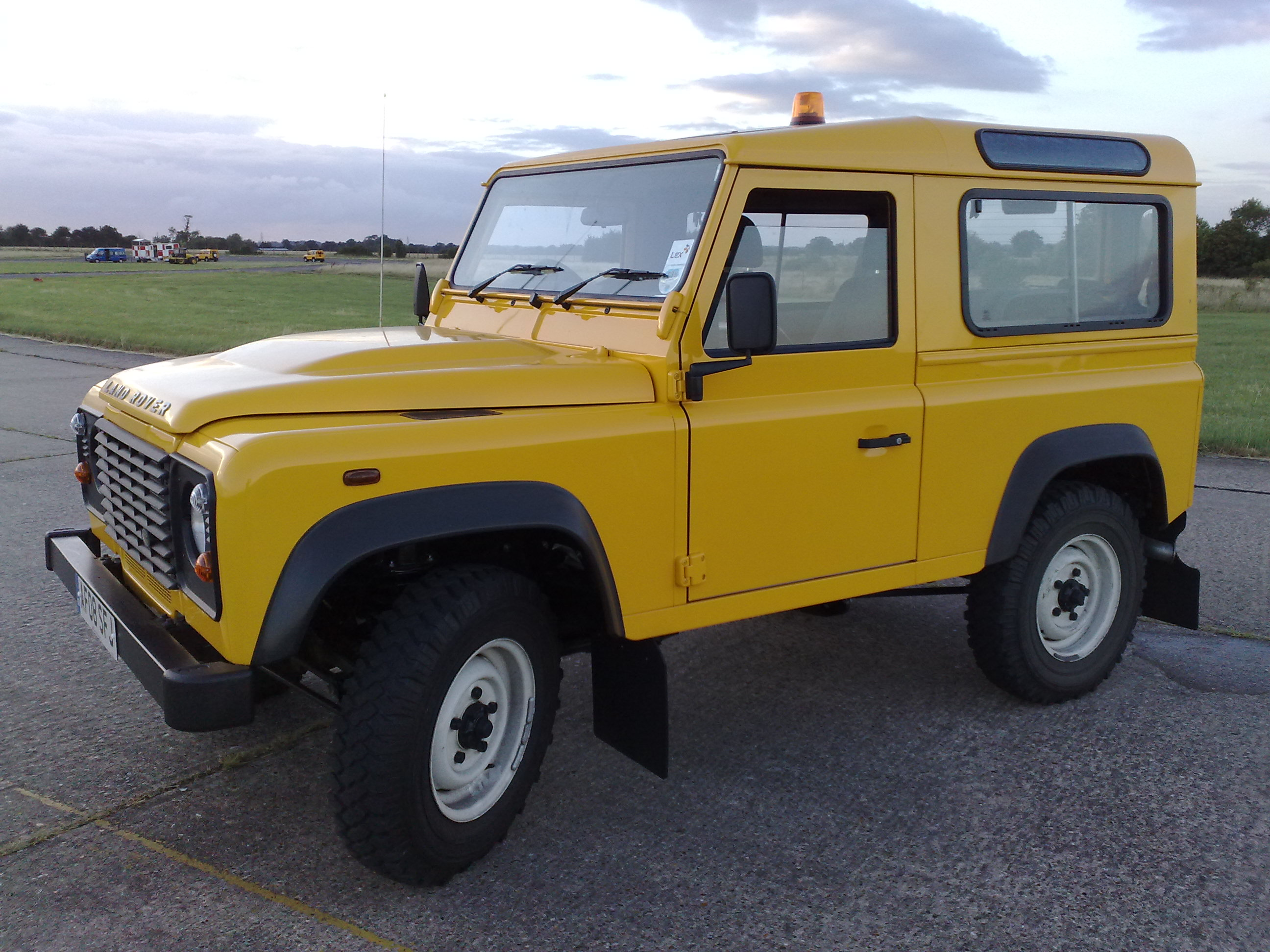
SWB Land Rover Defender at MDPGA Wethersfield with Runway 22 in the background on 1 September 2008

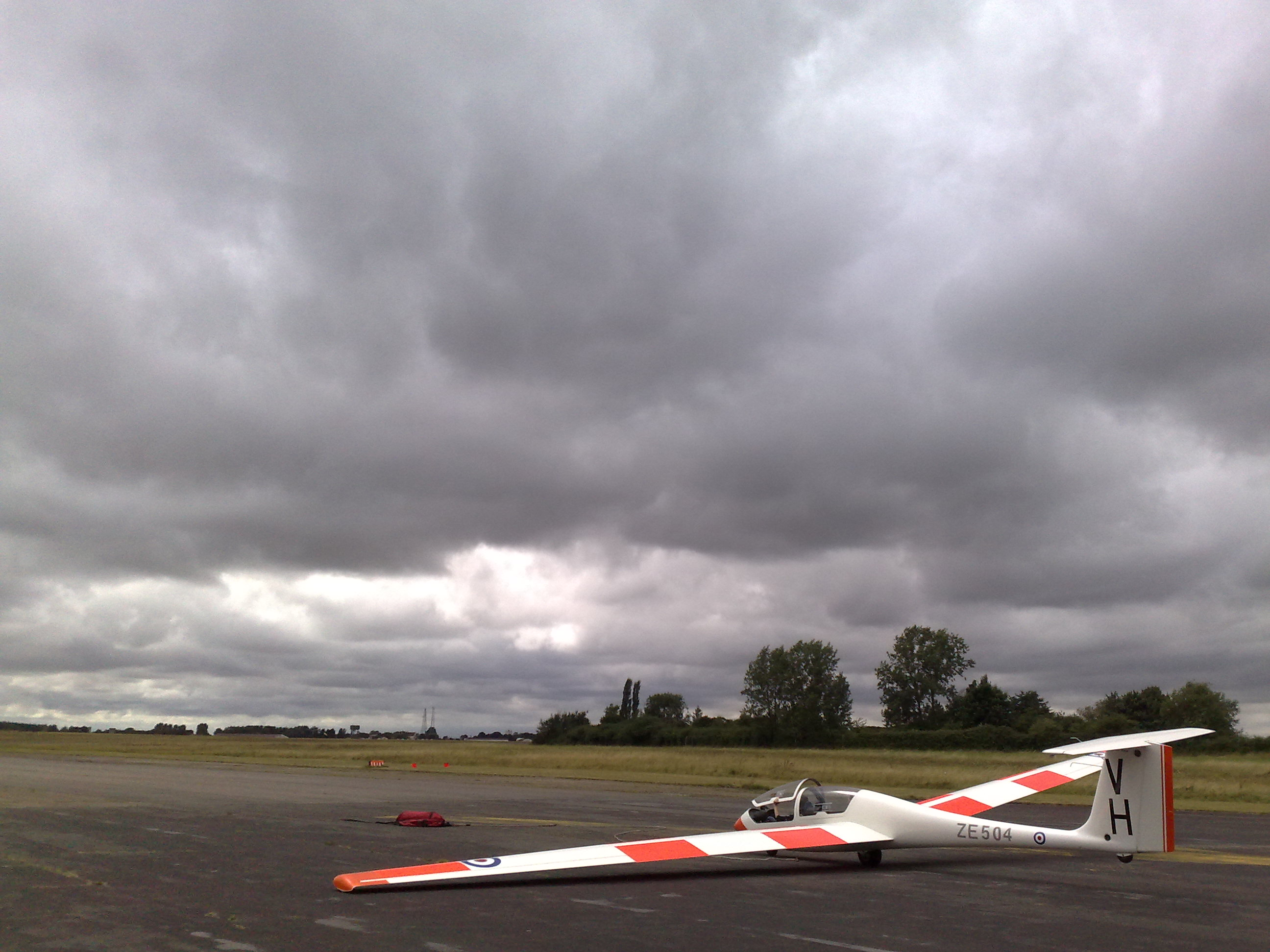
Viking ZE504 (VH) at MDPGA Wethersfield on Runway 22 on 2 September 2008

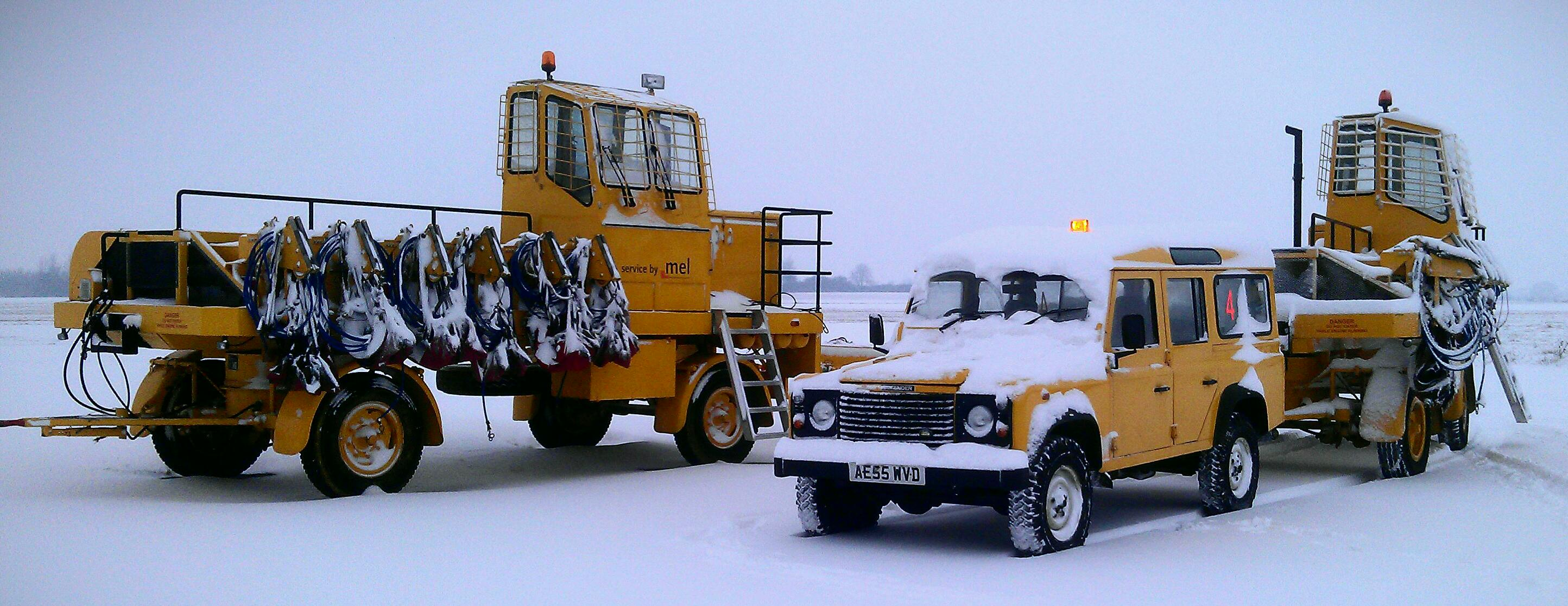
Van Gelder Winches and LWB Land Rover Defender at MDPGA Wethersfield outside Building 161 on 5 February 2012

During 2006 Sqn Ldr G. Capon took over command of 614 VGS from Sqn Ldr T. Horsley; since this the squadron has undergone major changes in organisation and in personnel. The personnel in the remaining five executive posts have also since changed, this includes the previous Technical Officer Flt Lt Graham Hayes becoming the current Chief Flying Instructor.

During the last six years 614 VGS has returned to RAF Debden, which is now known as Carver Barracks, for its Annual Dining In Night. This is traditional held towards the end of April each year.

=== Squadron Headquarters ===
The squadron has now been based in Building 161 for 20 years, which continues to be one of the remaining T2 Hangars at MDPGA Wethersfield. During this time much work has been done by the MOD and the squadron to bring the building and the facilities inside up to scratch. Running repairs have been carried out to the main metal skin of the hangar and the doors have been serviced.

Since 2006 considerable work has been done with respect to improving and renovating the hangar and side buildings. In 2009 a new kitchen was installed providing the squadron with suitable facilities to feed its members. In 2010 further outside lighting was installed around the car park areas. In 2011 a major asbestos removal project was carried out in Building 161, this took several months and returned the side buildings of the hangar to a usable condition. At the same time as this was carried out the squadron also refurbished its social areas and the side buildings were completely re-roofed making the side building weather proof.

=== Airfield ===
The squadron operates off of all three runways at MDPGA Wethersfield. These are currently in varying states of repair, the main runway 10/28 has an asphalt surface its whole length which stretches to just over 9000 ft and is the preferred runway of operation for the squadron. As well as the main runway there are two further runways, 04/22 and 15/33, these are both around 5000 ft in length and there surfaces are often made up of loose material and grass as opposed to asphalt. This has been caused by two main factors, the first of these is that during the 1980s the base was the home of a runway repair unit which used the smaller runways to test new techniques. The second is that since that very little work has been done to stop the natural degradation of the asphalt.

=== Milestones ===
On 2 July 2010 Sqn Ldr Terry Horsley reached the milestone of 10,000 launches. This was marked with a memorial flight with the longest serving member of 614 VGS Flt Lt Graham Hayes as a passenger.

On 31 December 2011 the 2012 New Year Honours were announced and two serving members of the squadron were recognised. Squadron Leader Terry Horsley received an MBE and Wing Commander Iain Lunan received an OBE.

=== Equipment ===
The squadron operates numerous pieces of equipment to support its gliding operations at MDPGA Wethersfield. The squadron operates "White Fleet" vehicles as opposed to Green Fleet. This includes 3 Short wheelbase Land Rover Defenders and 1 long wheelbase. The squadron also uses a Lamborghini Tractor to tow its winches and caravan as well as towing the cables from the winch. The winches that the squadron operates are Van Gelder Six Drum Trailer variant, this enables 6 launches to be carried out each time the cables are towed from the winch.

=== Organisation ===
The squadron is currently organised in much the same manner as it has been for decades. The executives are made up of 6 established posts: Commanding Officer, Chief Flying Instructor, adjutant, Technical Officer, Training Officer and Equipment Officer. These are then supplemented by further posts to support them i.e. Flight Safety Officer. The squadron is then organised into two flights (A & B), these attend on alternate weekends and between them cover the flying during week-long courses. The squadron fluctuates between 40 and 60 members.

=== Wethersfield Operations ===
By using the above flight system, the squadron operated between 110 and 130 days a year. Operations were organised each day by the duty instructor and overseen by the VGSDE (Volunteer Gliding Squadron duty executive). At Wethersfield, 614 VGS completed around 6,000 launches a year, resulting in over 800 hours airborne.

== Aircraft operated ==
- Slingsby Sedbergh TX.1 1947–1983
- Elliotts Primary EoN 1948-19??
- Slingsby Grasshopper TX.1 1952-19??
- Slingsby Cadet TX.2 1955–1983
- Grob Viking TX.1 1983 – present

== OC 614 Squadron ==
Date appointed	Name
19??	Flt Lt William Verling
1963	Flt Lt William Sole
1970	Flt Lt Les Howe
1983	Squadron Leader Frank Martin
June 1993	Squadron Leader Terry Horsley MBE
June 2006	Squadron Leader George Capon
February 2018	Squadron Leader Tony Woods
