= Colleen (1936 film) =

1936 American film directed by Alfred Edward Green

- Movie still
- Directed by: Alfred E. Green
- Written by: Peter Milne; F. Hugh Herbert; Sig. Herzig
- Story by: Robert Lord
- Produced by: Hal B. Wallis; Jack L. Warner
- Starring: Dick Powell; Ruby Keeler; Jack Oakie; Joan Blondell; Marie Wilson
- Cinematography: Byron Haskin; Sol Polito
- Edited by: Terry Morse
- Music by: Heinz Roemheld
- Production company: Warner Bros. Pictures
- Distributed by: Warner Bros. Pictures
- Release date: March 21, 1936
- Running time: 89 minutes
- Country: United States
- Language: English

Colleen is a 1936 American romantic musical comedy film directed by Alfred E. Green and starring Dick Powell, Ruby Keeler, and Joan Blondell. It was produced and distributed by Warner Bros. Pictures and was the seventh and final picture starring both Keeler and Powell.

== Plot ==
Cedric Ames is the absent-minded and easily distracted president of a large business, which is largely run by his subordinates, including his nephew Donald. Cedric impulsively hires an assistant named Joe Cork, who sees the businessman as an easy mark.

While touring a candy company that is located in one of the buildings he owns, Cedric meets a "chocolate dipper" named Minnie Hawkins. Influenced by his new assistant, he buys a dress shop for Minnie, who is a gold digger, to manage. Donald tries to fix things by going to the dress shop to examine the books.

Colleen Reilly, the bookkeeper at the dress shop, is angry that Donald plans to close it. When newspaper headlines about the "businessman who bought a dress shop for a chocolate dipper" bring business to the shop, Colleen uses the opportunity to stage a fashion show. The increase in customers begins to make the shop profitable for the first time. Colleen convinces Donald to keep the shop open. Donald asks her to dinner to discuss her plans for the shop. She says yes, then reveals that she is engaged, by coincidence, to Joe Cork.

Joe, meanwhile, begins to see Minnie. Joe and Minnie concoct a plan to have Cedric adopt Minnie, and then Joe will marry her. When this news gets picked up in the gossip columns, Cedric's wife Alicia is scandalized and forces Donald to close the shop. However, Donald is in love with Colleen and she's in love with him. Minnie and Joe are both fired.

In revenge, Minnie sues Cedric for five million dollars for breaking his promise to adopt her and Joe sues Donald for five million dollars for stealing Colleen. They are both bought off with $25,000. Colleen is also fired, by mistake, and given a check for $10,000 to give up any legal claims she may have.

Donald calls Colleen to ask her to marry him, and she berates him and hangs up before he can explain that it was a mistake. Brokenhearted, Colleen accepts an offer to open a dress shop on an ocean liner. It turns out that Donald is on the same ship, with Cedric and his wife. Donald and Colleen find each other, reconcile, and get engaged.

== Cast ==
- Dick Powell as Donald Ames 3rd
- Ruby Keeler as Colleen Reilly
- Jack Oakie as Joe Cork
- Joan Blondell as Minnie Hawkins
- Hugh Herbert as Cedric Ames
- Louise Fazenda as Alicia Ames
- Paul Draper as Paul Gordon
- Marie Wilson as Mabel
- Luis Alberni as Carlo
- Hobart Cavanaugh as Noggin
- Berton Churchill as Logan
- J.M. Kerrigan as Pop Reilly
- Addison Richards as Schuyler
- Charles Coleman as Butler
- Mary Treen as Miss Hively – Cedric's Secretary
- Spencer Charters as Doctor Frothingham
- Ward Bond as Sweeney – Second Officer
- Claire Rochelle as Chorus Girl (uncredited)

== Soundtrack ==
- "Boulevardier from the Bronx"
  - Music by Harry Warren
  - Lyrics by Al Dubin
  - Sung and danced by Joan Blondell and Jack Oakie
- "An Evening with You"
  - Music by Harry Warren
  - Lyrics by Al Dubin
  - Sung by Ruby Keeler and Dick Powell
- "I Don't Have to Dream Again"
  - Music by Harry Warren
  - Lyrics by Al Dubin
  - Sung by Dick Powell and chorus and danced by chorus
  - Sung as "The Magic and the Mystery of Clothes" by Ruby Keeler
- "Summer Night"
  - Music by Harry Warren
  - Lyrics by Al Dubin
  - Played on piano and hummed by Dick Powell
- "You Gotta Know How to Dance"
  - Music by Harry Warren
  - Lyrics by Al Dubin
  - Played during the opening photo credits and sung with special lyrics by Dick Powell, Ruby Keeler, Jack Oakie, Joan Blondell, Hugh Herbert, Louise Fazenda, Luis Alberni and Marie Wilson and chorus and tap-danced by Paul Draper and chorus
  - Sung by Dick Powell, danced by Paul Draper and Ruby Keeler in the finale
- "Bridal Chorus (Here Comes the Bride)"
  - Written by Richard Wagner
- "I Love You Truly"
  - Written by Carrie Jacobs Bond

== Reception ==
=== Critical response ===
Frank S. Nugent of The New York Times states in his review:

"'Colleen' is not as fresh as it might have been three years ago before '42d Street' and its descendants accustomed us to this sort of thing. It is not as striking as last year's 'Gold Diggers,' with its imaginatively photographed Broadway Lullaby number and its trained herd of white pianos going through a dance routine. It is not as tuneful as most of its predecessors, nor is its comedy any less juvenile than usual. All of this may sound pretty discouraging, even to a confirmed Warner musical addict, but it still is a relative opinion and should not be considered any more serious a reflection on 'Colleen' than our admission that we prefer one ballroom dance by Ginger Rogers and Fred Astaire to a whole program by Miss Keeler and Mr. Powell. It is purely a personal reaction and, if you happen to like the Keeler-Powell musicals, you probably will find this one entirely satisfying.

== Release ==
Colleen was released in theatres in 1936. The film was released on DVD by Warner Home Video on September 1, 2009.
