= Sanders Draper School =

Sanders Draper

Location
- Suttons Lane; Hornchurch, Greater London, RM12 6RT; England
- Coordinates: 51°33′00″N 0°12′54″E

Information
- Type: Academy
- Motto: Resilience...Achievement ...Family...
- Established: 1938 (official)
- Founder: Lady Simon
- Local authority: London Borough of Havering
- Department for Education URN: 146309 Tables
- Ofsted: Reports
- Head teacher: Stuart Brooks
- Gender: Co-educational
- Age: 11 to 16
- Enrolment: 660
- Website: http://www.sandersschool.org.uk

Sanders Draper is a mixed-gender secondary school for students aged between 11 and 16 located in Hornchurch, London Borough of Havering, UK. In September 2018 Mr Brooks took over as Headteacher and the school joined Success For All Educational Trust (SFAET) and so worked in partnership with Redden Court and Royal Liberty.

The school reverted to its historic name of Sanders Draper in September 2021, this followed the drive for this from Headteacher Mr Brooks and Success For All Educational Trust. The school is very keen to celebrate its history and has implemented a house system based on celebrating Havering heroes and the local community have voted on which of the 13 heroes will become the 5 house names.

== History ==
The school was opened as Suttons Modern Secondary School in 1937. It was built to provide educational facilities for between 950 and 1,100 students. It originally housed boys and girls in different departments with the boys on the southern edge, eventually running as two separate school establishments (one for boys and the other for girls) in 1945. The two "establishments" were amalgamated as one mixed school in 1953.

On 24 March 1943, an American volunteer with the RAF, Flying Officer Raimund Sanders Draper deliberately crashed his Spitfire to avoiding hitting the school, after engine failure on take-off from RAF Hornchurch.

In 1973 the school was renamed in his honour to Sanders Draper School.

In 2014 the Headteacher (John McEachern) made the decision to change the schools name to Sanders School

The school reverted to its rightful name of Sanders Draper in September 2021 following the drive for this from the Headteacher Stuart Brooks, SFAET. There was full support from the local community and ex students for this change which is part of the introduction of a new House system which celebrates Havering heroes and the school's rich history.
