= Raimund Sanders Draper =

British fighter pilot (1913–1943)

Flying Officer Raimund Sanders Draper
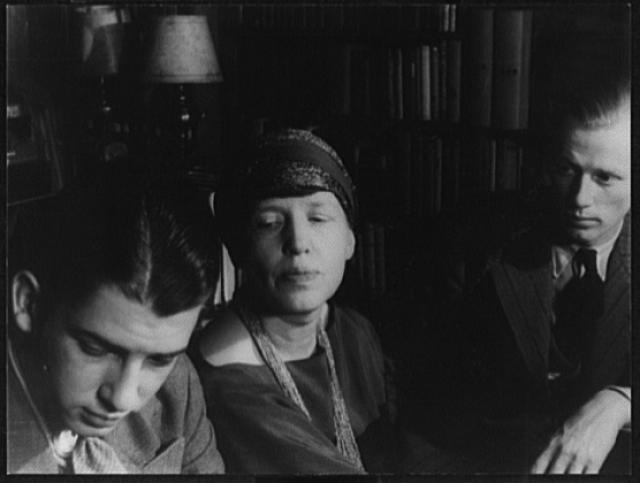
- Raimund Draper (left), his mother Muriel and brother Paul Draper in 1932
- Born: 27 December 1913; London, England
- Died: 24 March 1943 (aged 29); Hornchurch, Essex, England
- Cause of death: Aircraft crash
- Resting place: Hornchurch Cemetery
- Monuments: The Sanders School and Specialist Science College
- Occupation: Fighter pilot
- Employer: RAF
- Organization: No. 64 Squadron
- Known for: Self-sacrifice
- Spouse: Marcia Anne Myers Tucker
- Children: Marcia Anne
- Parent(s): Muriel and Paul Draper
- Relatives: Paul Draper brother, Ruth Draper aunt

Flying Officer Raimund Sanders Draper (27 December 1913 – 24 March 1943) was a Royal Air Force Fighter Command pilot who gained fame in 1943 after dying in an aircraft crash in Hornchurch, Essex. He was the son of activist Muriel Draper and the brother of dancer Paul Draper.

When his engine failed over a school after take-off from RAF Hornchurch, Draper chose to guide his aircraft into the ground outside of the school to protect the students and faculty present. The school changed its name to Sanders Draper School in 1973, and was renamed Sanders School in 2014.

== The crash ==
Flying Officer Raimund Sanders Draper, known as "Smudge", was an American volunteer World War II Royal Air Force (RAF) pilot of No. 64 Squadron. He deliberately crashed his Spitfire aircraft, to avoid hitting a school, after losing control on take-off from RAF Hornchurch, and was killed.

The plane's engine cut out at an estimated altitude of 200 feet (61 m) and the plane went into a spin. As the plane headed for Suttons School, just 530 yards (480 m) from the airfield perimeter, Draper put the nose down and forced the aircraft into the ground short of the main building. The aircraft bounced and a wing stuck the building.

Only one student, 13-year-old Richard (Dick) Barton was injured, with 5 other students treated for minor shock.

From the Boys School Daily Log, Wednesday, 24 March 1943:

At 10.45 am an aircraft crashed on the playing field, the main parts being ricocheted onto the drive, fragments breaking a total of 9 windows in three classrooms. Splinters from the 'plane scored the wall and injured the playing field and shrubbery. Richard Barton (CL2) received a cut on the leg from flying glass needing medical attention and five boys were treated from primary shock. The boy with the injured leg was conveyed to his home by ambulance, under Dr. Heath's orders. School was evacuated to shelter for 15 minutes owing to probability of danger from fire and exploding ammunition. By 11.15 am the school had resumed normal work.

== Remembrance by students ==
An annual memorial service is held at his grave by men who were pupils at the school at the time of his death. Services at St Andrew's church, where the American pilot was buried, were begun by a group of the students from that time, in the 1980s. The last service was on the 70th anniversary, due to the age of the participants. They recall that the school had 650 students at the time of the crash.

== School renamed in pilot's honour ==
In 1973, the school was renamed The Sanders Draper School and Specialist Science College in his honour and then changed in 2014 to Sanders School. The school will return to its rightful name of Sanders Draper in September 2021 following a drive for this from new Headteacher Mr Brooks and the Success For All Educational Trust which had the full backing of the local community.

== Personal life and family ==
Sanders Draper was American, but born in London, England. He attended Avon Old Farms school in USA. They continue to pay homage to Sanders and the sacrifice he made. Sadly he died age 29, on 24 March 1943 when he crashed his plane. His birth date is shown as 27 December 1913 on the Royal Aero Club Aviator's Certificate, which he received from the Airwork School of Flying on 16 June 1936 in Great Britain. He lived mainly in Manhattan, New York, in the USA. He was the younger son of American interior decorator, writer, and hostess Muriel Draper, the wife of a socially prominent lieder singer, Paul Draper. His parents married in 1909 in New York, then travelled in Europe; his father died in 1925 at age 38. His biological father was reputedly the pianist Artur Rubinstein. His father's sister was actress Ruth Draper while one uncle, George Draper, a prominent doctor, was married to American interior decorator Dorothy Draper. His older brother was Paul Draper, a noted dancer and actor. In 1940, George, Paul and their mother Muriel lived in New York City, per the 1940 US Census, National Archives and Records Administration.

In 1934, he married Marcia Anne Myers Tucker (later Mrs Charles Carroll Fulton Bagley). Later divorced, they had one daughter, Marcia Anne Draper.
