= Paul Draper (dancer) =

American tap dancer and choreographer (1909–1996)

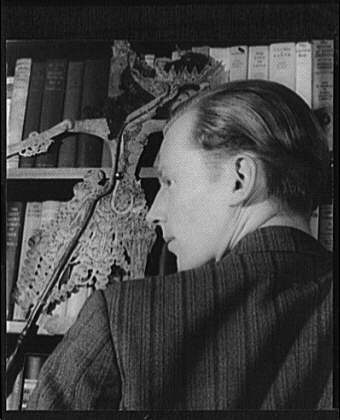
- Paul Draper (1932); Photo by Carl Van Vechten
- Born: Paul Nathaniel Saltonstall Draper; October 25, 1909; Florence, Tuscany, Italy
- Died: September 20, 1996 (aged 86); Woodstock, New York, U.S.
- Occupations: Tap dance Choreography
- Years active: 1932–1990
- Notable work: Sonata for Tap Dancer
- Spouse: Heidi Vosseler
- Children: Pamela, Susan, Kate
- Parent(s): Muriel and Paul Draper
- Relatives: Ruth Draper aunt Raimund Sanders Draper brother

Paul Draper Jr. (October 25, 1909 – September 20, 1996) was a noted American tap dancer and choreographer. Born into an artistic, socially prominent New York family, the nephew of Ruth Draper was an innovator in the arts. His passion and unique style led him to international stardom. One signature piece was Sonata for Tap Dancer, danced without musical accompaniment.

Draper was a natural dancer. He took six tap dancing lessons at Tommy Nip's Broadway dance school in 1930 before performing solo in London in 1932. He enrolled in the School of American Ballet and realized the possibilities of combining tap and classical ballet, forming his unique style. By 1937, he was performing at such venues as the Persian Room at the Plaza Hotel and the Rainbow Room. Carnegie Hall followed, then Broadway and a film version of William Saroyan's Time of Your Life (1948). In 1940, he teamed up with Larry Adler, a virtuoso harmonicist. The two became a world-famous act, performing together until 1949. They appeared as regulars at City Center in New York. The act disbanded when they were blacklisted as Communist sympathizers. In response to these charges, Adler moved to the United Kingdom. Draper moved to Geneva, Switzerland for three years.

When he returned to the US, Draper performed on Broadway and in other venues from about 1954. Draper taught in the theater department at Carnegie Mellon University in Pittsburgh, Pennsylvania from 1967 to 1978 as the Andrew Mellon Chair in the School of Drama. His live performances decreased during this period of teaching, but he did occasionally show up at American Dance Festival.

== Beginnings ==
The Draper family settled in Manhattan, New York when Paul was four years old. Paul ran away from home at the age of 17 to dig ditches in Woodstock, New York. He took an engineering course at Polytechnic Institute, but he quit after one year. He worked odd jobs around New York. He was an assistant music critic, and briefly became an instructor at an Arthur Murray dance school. In 1930, he took six lessons on tap dance at Tommy Nip's Broadway dance school, and then went to London to perform.

== Style and career ==
Draper enrolled in the School of American Ballet, which led him to develop his trademark style, incorporating ballet vocabulary and technique into his tap dancing. This set him apart from other major dancers of the decades of the 1930s and 1940s, like Fred Astaire and Bill Robinson, when Draper's career was in its prime. He tapped out "intricate rhythms to classical music", earning him the accolade of "aristocrat of tap." Draper "has evolved a routine which combines tap with techniques of classical ballet and which allows him to base his one-man choreographies on any type of music, classical, folk and popular." In his solo performances in this period, one signature piece is Sonata for Tap Dancer, danced without musical accompaniment. Draper was in a film version of William Saroyan's Time of Your Life (1948). He performed with Harmonica player Larry Adler from 1939 to 1949. A highlight of their performances was their version of Gershwin's "I Got Rhythm", called a "show-stopper".

They sued a woman who accused them of being Communists in 1949. The case ended with the jury making no decision, in May 1950. This stopped performances in the US, with a segment already taped, cut from the Ed Sullivan show, Toast of the Town. Neither man was communist, but they did object to the activities of the House Committee on Un-American Activities. Both men left the US in 1951. Adler went to England. Draper went to Geneva, Switzerland for three years.

Returning to the US in 1954, Draper performed on Broadway with his aunt, Ruth Draper. In 1955, Draper returned to the stage performing in Stravinsky's Histoire du Soldat at the Phoenix Theater. In the 1960s, he danced in Jerome Moross's Gentlemen, Be Seated. Draper also choreographed pieces for George Kleinsinger's Archy and Mehitabel at Goodspeed Opera House, and performed in the Broadway musical Come Summer during the sixties. Draper taught in the theater department at Carnegie Mellon University in Pittsburgh, Pennsylvania from 1967 to 1978 as the Andrew Mellon Chair in the School of Drama. Draper was seldom seen in concert dance during this time. He did make appearances at and create pieces for the American Dance Festival and Lee Theodore's American Dance Machine.

Draper and Adler were historically reunited for one performance in June 1975 at Carnegie Hall, prompting The New York Times to state:

"Draper's dancing remains impeccably musical and impressively limber. He seemed barely to be touching the floor at times. One thinks naturally of Astaire and Ray Bolger when Mr Draper is in full flight, but his style is so intense and serious that comparisons are not really to the point."

== Communist accusations ==
In 1949, Draper was accused of affiliating with the Communist party. A routine of his was to appear on CBS's Toast of the Town in 1950, but was cut out of the segment due to protests the station received. During this period, Draper was forced to put a stop to his tour because many television programs and hotels felt they could not host such a controversial figure. He filed a libel suit against a Connecticut housewife who claimed he was a Communist, but still received negative press. Draper left the United States in 1951 following this scandal and lived in Switzerland for three years. The LA Times claims "he later resumed his career but never recaptured his original popularity."

== Performances ==
- 1933: Crystal Nocturne at Radio City Hall
- 1934: Thumbs Up at St. James Theater on Broadway (Broadway debut)
- 1936: appeared in the film Colleen
- 1939: "I Got Rhythm" (music by Larry Adler) at various New York theaters
- 1942: appeared in a short film with Lee Dixon called Six Hits and a Miss
- 1946: Tap Dancer Supreme at the KRNT Radio Theater (music by Larry Adler)
- 1948: appeared in the film The Time of Your Life
- 1955: All In One at various New York theaters
- 1968: appeared on Episode 0049 of Mister Rogers' Neighborhood
- 1975: reunion performance with Larry Adler at Carnegie Hall

== Family and personal life ==
Paul Draper was born to Muriel Sanders and Paul Draper, a lieder singer, in Florence, Italy on October 25, 1909. His parents had married in the US in 1909, then proceeded to Italy. His mother was very active in artistic circles in New York and London. His parents divorced shortly after moving to the United States when Paul was four years old; his father died in 1925 at age 35. Paul was passed around from one relative's household to the next upon their return to the US. His mother entertained renowned guests like Henry James, Pablo Picasso, Arthur Rubinstein, and Norman Douglas in the family salon in their London home. His paternal great-grandfather Charles Anderson Dana was owner and editor of the New York newspaper The Sun from 1868 until his death. His aunt Ruth Draper was an author, lecturer, and monologuist.

Draper married Heidi Vosseler, a ballerina for George Balanchine's first American ballet company, on June 23, 1941, in Rio de Janeiro. Vosseler lived with him in Europe until they returned to the United States in 1954. The couple had three daughters, Pamela, Susan Kosowski and Kate. His wife died from lung cancer in 1992, leaving Paul a widower until he died on September 20, 1996, at his home in Woodstock, New York at age 86 from emphysema.

== Bibliography ==
- Draper, Paul, and Fran Avallone. On Tap Dancing. New York: M. Dekker, 1978
