= Lauro De Bosis =

Italian poet and aviator (1901–1931)

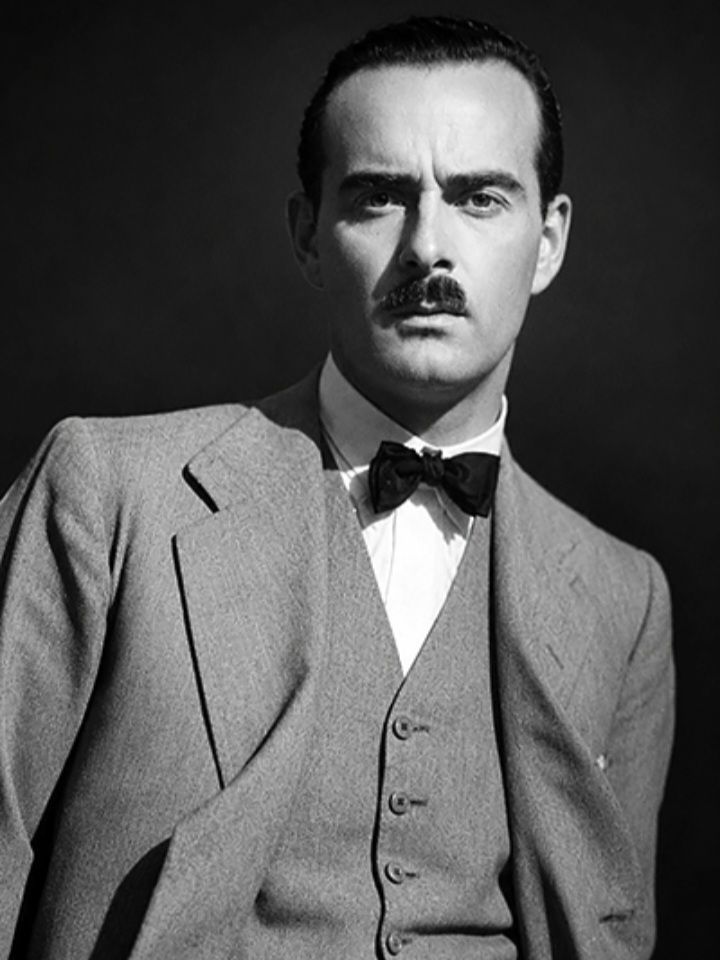
- Born: 9 December 1901; Rome, Italy
- Died: 3 October 1931 (aged 29); Tyrrhenian Sea
- Education: Chemistry
- Alma mater: Sapienza University of Rome
- Occupations: Writer, poet, aviator
- Partner: Ruth Draper
- Writing career
- Language: Italian
- Years active: 1924–1931
- Period: 1930–1931

Olympic medal record

Art competitions
Silver medal – second place	1928 Amsterdam	Dramatic works

Lauro Adolfo De Bosis (Rome, 9 December 1901 – Tyrrhenian Sea, 3 October 1931) was an Italian poet, aviator, and anti-fascist.

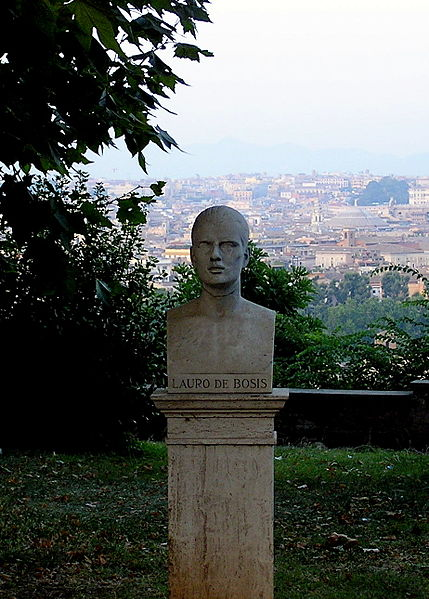
Bust of De Bosis Gianicolo, Rome

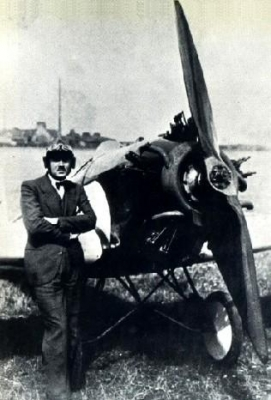
Lauro De Bosis in front of his Klemm L 25 in 1931

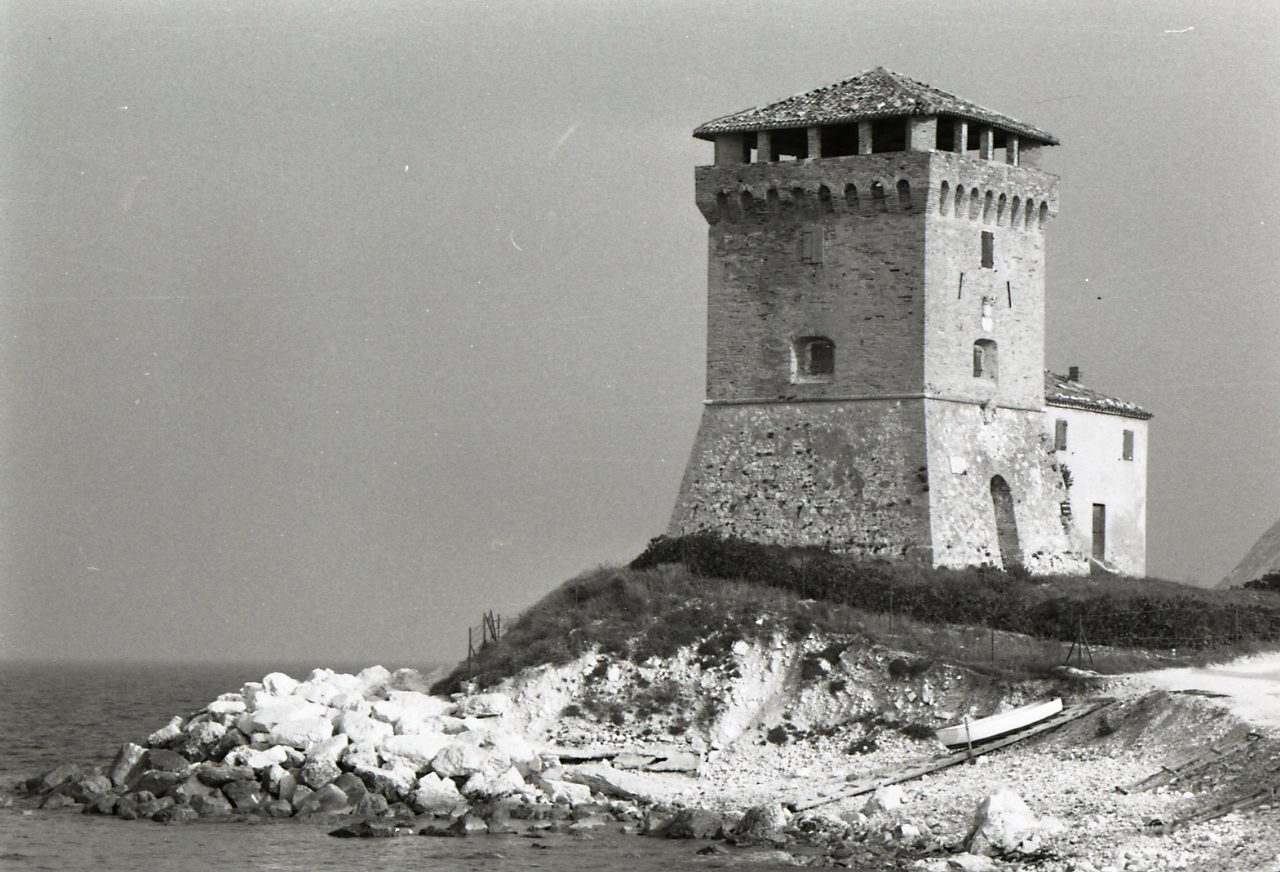
Clementine Tower, Portonovo, Ancona

== Life ==
Lauro de Bosis was born in 1901 in Rome. His mother was Lillian Vernon, a New Englander, writer, daughter of a Methodist pastor, was also a lover of literature and poetry in particular.

His father, Adolfo, was from Ancona; he was a minor poet and editor of the review Convito, literary magazine that appeared at irregular intervals from January 1895 to 1907, publishing prose, poetry, and graphic works. Gabriele D'Annunzio, Giovanni Pascoli and Giosuè Carducci also published in this magazine. Adolfo translated Shelley, while Lauro himself translated tragedies by Aeschylus and Sophocles, and Frazer's The Golden Bough. At university he studied chemistry. Their home was a type of intellectual salon.

The De Bosis family, having moved to Rome for business, maintained an ancient watchtower in their hometown Ancona: the Clementine Tower of Portonovo, located on the seashore, beneath the cliffs of Monte Conero. This tower was a gathering place for poetry lovers (Gabriele D'Annunzio had also been a guest there), and Lauro also went there to seek inspiration. This is recalled by the text on the plaque placed on the tower:

Here, in his tower, overlooking the Adriatic Sea, Adolfo de Bosis, a poet from Ancona, found inspiration for his lyrics, in spiritual communion with his son Lauro.

== Anti-fascism ==
De Bosis became quickly disillusioned with Mussolini after the 1924 murder of the anti-fascist politician Giacomo Matteotti. In 1928 he won a silver medal in the art competitions of the Olympic Games for his verse-drama "Icaro", an anti-fascist allegory disguised as a retelling of the Greek myth. That same year he met actress Ruth Draper and commenced a relationship that continued until his death.

De Bosis shuttled back and forth between Italy and the United States, where he taught Italian literature at Harvard. In the summer of 1930, De Bosis resigned from the Italy-America Society to found the "Alleanza Nazionale" and concentrate on the group's mission—the clandestine circulation of anti-Fascist newsletters in Italy. Inspired by another anti-Fascist (Giovanni Bassanesi) who earlier had flown over Milan dropping leaflets denouncing Il Duce, de Bosis decided to embark upon a similar flight over Rome. The following summer De Bosis took flying lessons.

== Death ==
On 3 October 1931, with only seven-and-a-half hours flying time and a partially filled fuel tank, De Bosis took off from Marseille on a small Klemm L 25, heading for Corsica and then Italy. He reached Rome and circled for half an hour over the city centre, including Piazza Venezia – where Mussolini was sitting in council – dropping thousands of antifascist leaflets during the crowded evening hour. He was gone by the time the Italian Air Forces responded. The small wooden plane headed out to sea for Corsica never to be seen again. According to the pilots who had fuelled the plane, he was an inexperienced pilot and had told them that he intended to fly from Nice to Barcelona and back, so his plane had not been fully fuelled. A promising poet, at the time of his death he had been editing a volume of Italian poetry for the Oxford University Press. His papers are saved in Houghton Library, Harvard University.

In 1938, actress Ruth Draper made an endowment to maintain a lecture series on Italian culture, history and society, named after De Bosis in Harvard University. In 1973 more funds were supplied by Fiat's Giovanni Agnelli Foundation. De Bosis Committee now grants postdoctoral fellowships, invites visiting professors and organizes Colloquia in Italian studies.

Thornton Wilder dedicated his novel Ides of March (1948) to him.
