= RAF Hornchurch =

Former Royal Air Force station in Essex, England

RAF Hornchurch
- Near Hornchurch, Essex in England
- Station badge

Site information
- Type: Royal Air Force station parent station 1928 - sector station ? - 1944
- Code: HO/HC
- Owner: Air Ministry
- Operator: Royal Flying Corps; Royal Air Force
- Controlled by: RAF Fighter Command 1928–44 * No. 11 Group RAF

Location
- Shown within Greater London RAF Hornchurch (Essex) RAF Hornchurch (the United Kingdom)
- Coordinates: 51°32′19″N 000°12′17″E

Site history
- Built: 1915 & 1928
- In use: 3 October 1915 – 31 December 1919, (As Sutton's Farm), 1 April 1928 – 1 July 1962, (As RAF Hornchurch)
- Battles/wars: First World War; European theatre of World War II; Cold War

Airfield information
- Elevation: 18 metres (59 ft) AMSL
Runways
Direction	Length and surface
02/20	Grass
12/30	Grass
10/28	Grass

Royal Air Force Hornchurch, or more simply RAF Hornchurch, is a former Royal Air Force sector station in the parish of Hornchurch, Essex (now the London Borough of Havering in Greater London), located to the southeast of Romford. The airfield was known as Sutton's Farm during the First World War, when it occupied 90 acres (360,000 m^{2}) of the farm of the same name. It was used for the protection of London, being 14 miles (22.5 km) east north-east of Charing Cross.

Although the airfield closed shortly after the end of the war, the land was requisitioned in 1923 because of the expansion of the Royal Air Force and it re-opened as a much larger fighter station in 1928. The airfield was ideal to cover both London and the Thames corridor from German air attacks. It was a key air force installation between both wars and into the jet age, closing in 1962.

== History ==
=== First World War ===
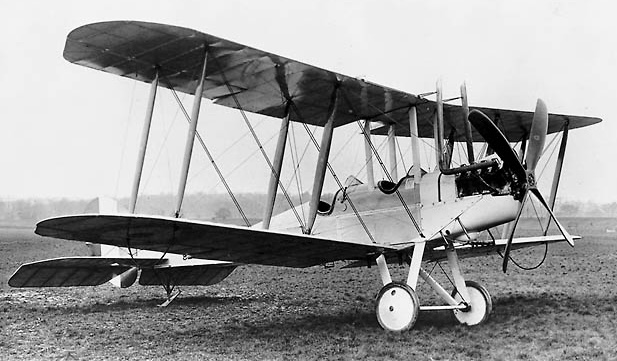
A Royal Aircraft Factory B.E.2c similar to those that flew from Sutton's Farm in 1915 and 1916

Lt. William Leefe Robinson (left) and Lt. Wulstan Tempest, both of whom shot down enemy airships.

In 1915 the London Air Defence Area (LADA) was established and airfields were built around London to defend the capital from the growing threat from German airships. Sutton's Farm, along with its neighbour Hainault Farm (just east of what became the Second World War airfield of Fairlop), 8 miles (12.9 km) to the north-east, were selected due to their location covering the eastern approaches to London. They were named Landing Grounds Nos. II and III respectively and joined the existing airfields of North Weald, Rochford and Joyce Green. Suttons Farm airfield became operational on 3 October 1915, initially with two BE2c aircraft.

As the number of aircraft increased at the airfields around London, it was decided to organise them into 39 (Home Defence) Squadron, which was formed in April 1916, under the command of Major (later Brigadier-General) Thomas Higgins. As the enemy threat moved from airships to aircraft, better aircraft were introduced to counter them. The BE12, Sopwith 1½ Strutter, Sopwith Pup, FE2, Bristol Fighter, SE5a and Sopwith Camel all operated from Sutton's Farm at some stage, some with more success than others. 39 Squadron moved to North Weald in September 1917 and was replaced by 78 Squadron, under the command of Major Cuthbert Rowden, a 20-year-old veteran of the air war in France and subsequent winner of the Military Cross. 78 Squadron was later joined by 189 Night Fighter Training Squadron with Sopwith Pups and Camels.

The first recorded interception of an enemy airship over Britain was made by Lt. (later Marshal of the Royal Air Force) John Slessor on the very day he arrived at Sutton's Farm, 13 October 1915. The attack had to be aborted as the airship disappeared into the cloud and he had to break off the engagement. The first victory in Britain was not recorded until nearly a year later, on 2 September 1916 and was attributed to a pilot from Sutton's Farm, Lt. William Leefe Robinson. Robinson shot down a Schütte-Lanz SL11, one of a 16-strong raiding force over London, using a new mixture of Brock and Pomeroy mixed incendiary ammunition, which had been adapted for this task. For this action Leefe Robinson was awarded the Victoria Cross and became a National hero. Two other Sutton's Farm pilots from the First World War, Lt. Frederick Sowrey and Lt. Wulstan Tempest, were awarded the DSO for their roles in the destruction of Zeppelins. Tempest's actions were particularly notable; even though his fuel pump was broken and he had to pump fuel manually whilst flying the aircraft with his other hand, he still managed to engage and destroy an enemy airship and then find his way home in thick fog. These pilots, together with many others, are commemorated by street names in South Hornchurch.

=== Inter-war years ===
Soon after the war ended it was decided that Suttons Farm was surplus to requirements and the airfield was decommissioned, although it was retained on "List C" (stations temporarily retained for Service purposes) until 27 February 1920. The land was returned, most of the buildings demolished and farming resumed once more.

Following the decision in the early 1920s to expand the Royal Air Force, former First World War airfields were inspected to ascertain their suitability for use. Although small, Suttons Farm was ideally located to be able to defend the north-eastern approaches to London. After protracted negotiations, the original land was re-purchased, together with some further land to the south of the original airfield.

The new airfield took four years to build and opened, as RAF Sutton's Farm, in April 1928. Two months later, the station renamed RAF Hornchurch. The first unit to take up residency was No. 111 Squadron, led by Squadron Leader Keith Park, who also became the first station commander.

=== Second World War ===
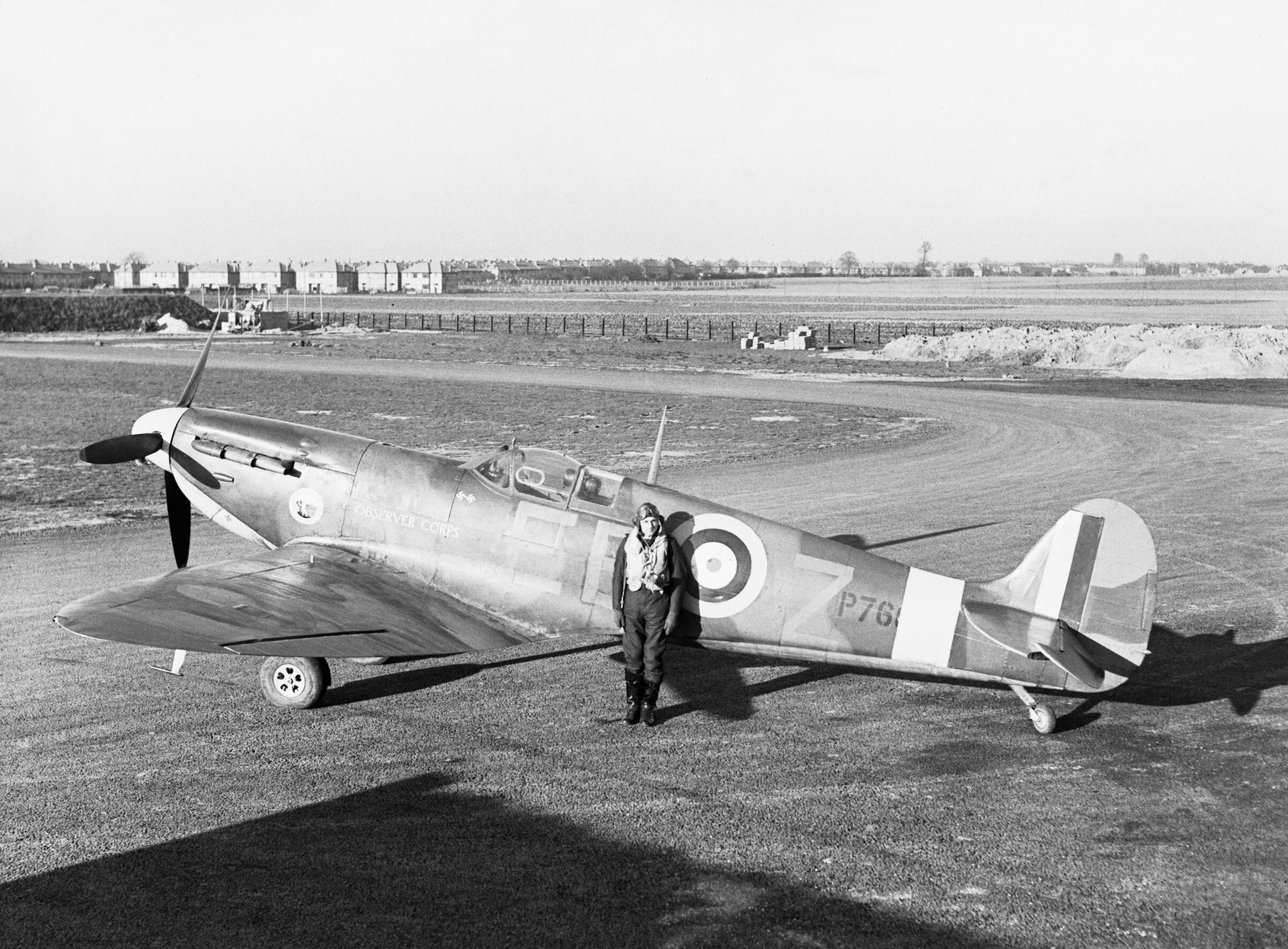
Squadron Leader Don Finlay and his Supermarine Spitfire at RAF Hornchurch in January 1941

During the Second World War the station was a Sector Airfield of RAF Fighter Command's 11 Group, covering London and the south east of England during the Battle of Britain in 1940, and therefore was a major target for the Luftwaffe, being raided on no less than twenty occasions. By this time, its command centre was in Romford, and a satellite station (an advanced attack outpost; RAF Rochford) was unpopular with the Hornchurch crews sent there from time to time because of the canvas accommodation.

Richard Hillary, author of The Last Enemy, was based at Hornchurch from 27 August 1940, claiming five kills in a week before being shot down on 3 September; he survived, but this proved the end of his time at Hornchurch.

Following the Battle of Britain, Hornchurch served as a base for cross-channel fighter operations. On 19 August 1942, three squadrons flying from Hornchurch took part in the unsuccessful Dieppe Raid. Amidst preparations for the Normandy landings, fighter squadrons were moved to further advanced airfields, and Hornchurch's importance diminished. In late 1944, barrage balloons were deployed nearby to counter the threat from the V-1 flying bomb, making the airfield unsafe for flying operations; instead, Hornchurch served as a marshalling base for transiting personnel.

=== Post-War Service ===
Following the war, Hornchurch was placed into reserve until 1947, before becoming home to the No. 17 Reserve Flying School until 1953. Flying Training Command's Aircrew Selection Centre moved to Hornchurch in 1952, and was based there until 1962, when it moved to RAF Biggin Hill.

A balloon unit was retained until closure for parachute training of military personnel, when on the 14 May 1961, CSM Albert E. Small of 10 Para Regt (TA), who was a balloon cage dispatcher, won the George Medal for gallantry due to a deflating balloon at 800 ft.

The RAF station at Hornchurch closed in July 1962.

== Today ==
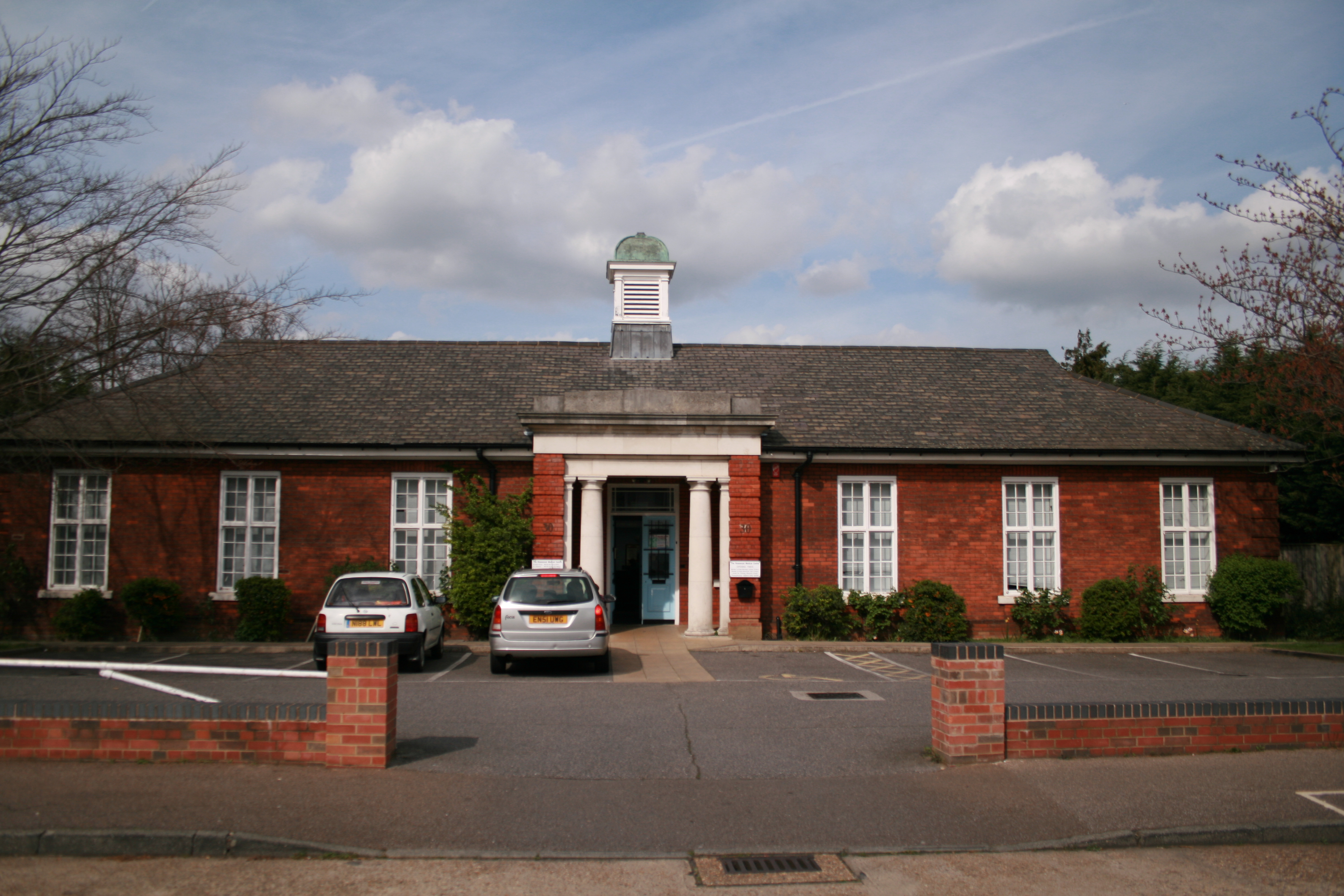
Astra House, the former Officers Mess, now a doctors' surgery

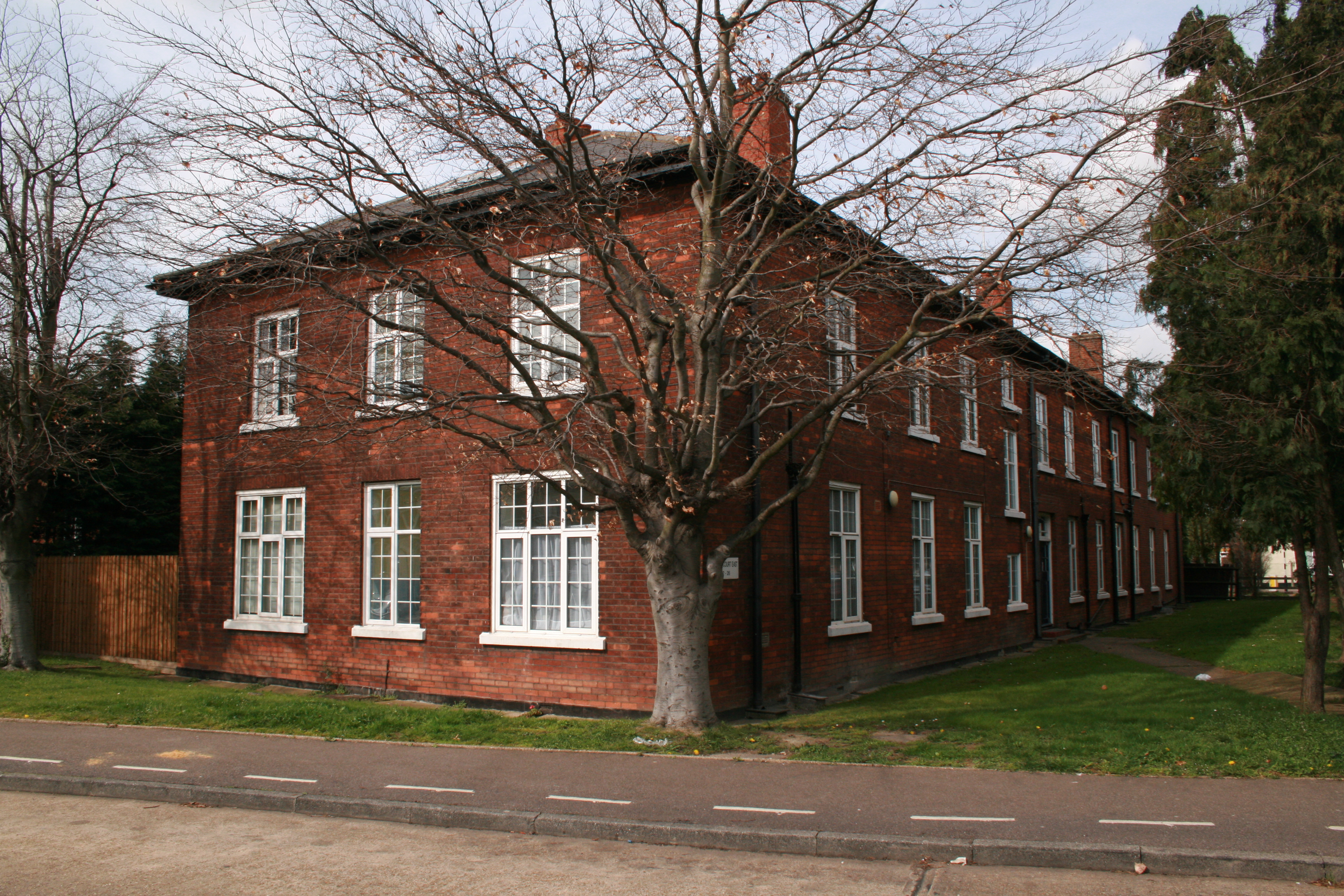
Astra Court East, the former Officers Quarters

Following a period of gravel extraction and infilling with rubbish in the 1970s, the airfield was extensively landscaped to create Hornchurch Country Park, with work commencing in 1980. Most of the former administrative and technical areas, including the two Type-A and one Type-C hangars, were levelled in the 1960s and the area is now a housing estate. The names of the streets of the estate commemorate the airfield and its pilots (such as Bouchier Walk, Kirton Close, Tempest Way, Robinson Close, Tuck Road, Bader Way and Malan Square). The former Officers' Mess is now a medical centre in Astra Close. The Officers' Mess (Astra House), Officers' Quarters (Astra Court East, West & North) and WO Quarters (89–99 (odd numbers) Wood Lane) are included in the RAF Hornchurch Conservation Area.

A local school, The R. J. Mitchell School, was named after the man who designed the Spitfire, and a large monument to this effect, with wreaths placed on Remembrance Day, is within the school railings. Another local school (Suttons School) was renamed Sanders Draper School in 1973, after an American pilot, Flying Officer Raimund (Smudge) Sanders Draper, flying with the Royal Air Force at the time, had an engine failure on take-off and stayed at his controls to ensure his aircraft didn't crash on the building, which was full of children at the time.

A number of pillboxes, command bunkers and gun positions, together with the largest number of surviving Tett Turrets in England, still exist within the boundaries of the former airfield and can be seen on the Eastern edge of the country park. RAF Hornchurch artefacts and memorabilia are housed in the Purfleet Heritage & Military Centre.

RAF Hornchurch was the subject of one of the programmes in the BBC TV series Two Men in a Trench. In the programme, several of the defences were examined. One of the Tett Turrets was excavated, with findings including a pair of 1940 RAF pilot's goggles and material from the hospital. The fire trench, a partially buried pillbox and an E pen were excavated, and the gun emplacement on the northern end of the site was cleared of vegetation.

The Good Intent pub, formerly with a large concrete, planetarium-like dome next door (used for training airgunners), still exists on the Southend Road, was popular with the aircrews, and has an interesting collection of photos of the Station.

A DVD about RAF Hornchurch was produced by Mike Jones for Streets Ahead Productions.

=== RAF Hornchurch Heritage Centre ===
The RAF Hornchurch Heritage Centre was opened in June 2021 by the Hornchurch Aerodrome Historical Trust. It opened in Suttons House on Suttons Lane, on the grounds of the former Suttons Institution, later St Georges Hospital. The hospital was commandeered by the Air Ministry for use by RAF personnel during the Second World War. An official opening event was held on 23 September 2021.

== Controversy ==
Contemporary postcard illustrating the destruction of Schütte-Lanz SL11

=== William Leefe Robinson ===
Although Robinson was awarded the Victoria Cross for shooting down Schütte-Lanz SL11 in 1916, it wasn't celebrated in all quarters, particularly by serving pilots in France. Home Defence was viewed as a relatively easy role and Robinson had trouble earning the respect of his fellow pilots when he was subsequently posted to France. These views were compounded when Robinson was shot down by an aircraft led by Manfred von Richthofen shortly after arriving in France. The awarding of the VC was, undoubtedly, partly politically motivated, although it must be remembered that any form of flying was inherently dangerous in 1916, particularly at night and at these tremendous heights without oxygen. Robinson also managed to single-handedly lift the spirit of a nation that had suffered the new terror of aerial bombardment from the apparently invincible airships.

=== Use of incendiary ammunition ===
Although effective in destroying enemy airships, the use of incendiary ammunition was banned under the terms of the Hague Convention of 1899 and pilots using it had to have signed orders from their commanding officer. This type of ammunition was issued only to squadrons in Home Defence roles and never to squadrons serving overseas. On his return to Sutton's Farm, William Leefe Robinson's CO ordered him to keep quiet about it as it was thought the propaganda value for the enemy would be invaluable should it leak out, even though the Germans had already broken the terms of the convention by using gas in 1915. Later in the war the use of incendiary ammunition became officially recognised.

=== The Battle of Barking Creek ===
The first aircraft to be shot down by the British in the Second World War, the circumstances surrounding which later came to be known as 'friendly fire' incidents, were two Hawker Hurricanes of 56 Squadron. On 6 September 1939, three days after the declaration of war, a searchlight battery on Mersea Island incorrectly identified a friendly aircraft crossing the Essex coast. A message was relayed to HQ 11 Group, which ordered Hurricanes from North Weald to investigate. They were subsequently misidentified as hostile aircraft themselves by the Chain Home Radar at Canewdon. Further aircraft from North Weald were scrambled to intercept their comrades, but they too were misidentified through a combination of miscommunication, inexperience and over-enthusiasm. A tragic, but inevitable mistake was now just minutes away; Spitfires from 74 Squadron, led by "Sailor" Malan, took off from Hornchurch and quickly engaged two Hurricanes, shooting them both down.

Pilot Officer Montague Hulton-Harrop was killed whilst the other pilot, Pilot Officer Tommy Rose, bailed out and landed safely. The two pilots responsible for the attack, Pilot Officer John Freeborn and Flying Officer Paddy Byrne were placed under arrest upon their return to Hornchurch. Freeborn had been the squadron adjutant and had distributed orders that single engined aircraft should not be engaged as it was assumed that enemy fighters would not have the fuel to be able to fly a return sortie from Germany and, therefore, any single engined aircraft would be friendly.

A court-martial was held on 7 October 1939, at which, Freeborn later claimed, that Malan said he never gave the order to attack. All three were acquitted, with the judge claiming that the case should never have been brought to trial. The proceedings have never been made public.

== Station commanders ==
Name	Rank as CO	From	To	Later career
RFC SUTTONS FARM				
Air Commodore T C R Higgins	Major	19/04/16	13/06/16	AOC No 10 Group
Major W C H Mansfield	Major	13/06/16	26/07/16	
Major A H Morton	Major	26/07/16	20/03/17	
Major R G H Murray	Major	20/03/17	07/07/17	
Major J C Halahan	Major	07/07/17	09/08/17	
Major W H D Acland	Major	09/08/17	30/08/17	
Air Marshal Sir P Babington	Major	30/08/17	01/09/17	AOC in Chief Flying Training Command
Major C R Rowden	Major	01/09/17	26/04/18	
Major G Allen	Major	26/04/18	12/08/18	
Major C J Truran	Major	12/08/18	31/12/19	
RAF HORNCHURCH				
Air Chief Marshal Sir Keith Park	Sqn Ldr	01/04/28	16/03/29	AOC No 11 Gp, C in C, Air Command South East Asia
Group Captain F O Soden	Sqn Ldr	08/03/29		Station Commander Biggin Hill Dec 1940 – Jun 1941
Air Marshal Sir Leonard Slatter	Sqn Ldr	25/10/29	01/04/30	AOC Coastal Command
Air Commodore E R Manning	Wg Cdr	04/04/30		AOC No 223 Group
Air Commodore C H Nicholas	Wg Cdr	22/07/33		Returned 06/10/39 as Group Captain Nicholas
Squadron Leader W V Hyde	Wg Cdr	04/12/35	22/12/35	
Air Vice-Marshal A S G Lee	Wg Cdr	22/12/35		Chief, British Military Air Mission to Marshal Tito
Air Vice-Marshal Sir Matthew Frew	Wg Cdr	02/04/37	27/07/38	AOC Training HQ SAAF
Group Captain C T Walkington	Wg Cdr	27/07/38		
Air Commodore C H Nicholas	Gp Capt	06/10/39		Duty Air Commodore HQ ADGB
Air Vice Marshal Sir Cecil Bouchier	Wg Cdr	20/12/39	21/12/40	AOC British Commonwealth Air Forces of Occupation Japan
Air Chief Marshal Sir Harry Broadhurst	Wg Cdr	20/12/40	12/05/42	AOC Bomber Command, Managing Director A V Roe & Co
Air Vice Marshal C G Lott	Gp Capt	14/05/42		Commandant School of Land/Air Warfare
Air Commodore A G Adnams	Gp Capt	05/01/43		AOC, RAAF Land/Air Warfare School
Air Commodore H L Maxwell	Gp Capt	20/07/43	28/10/43	Director of Air Policy SHAPE
Air Vice Marshal F D S Scott-Malden	Wg Cdr	28/10/43	06/02/44	Assistant Chief of Air Staff (Policy)
Wing Commander R Watts-Jones	Sqn Ldr	06/02/44	20/04/44	
Squadron Leader R S Davies	Sqn Ldr	20/04/44	01/12/44	
Squadron Leader R J Clare-Hunt	Sqn Ldr	01/12/44	14/07/46	
Wing Commander G W Day	Wg Cdr	14/07/46	03/12/46	
Wing Commander S H Page	Wg Cdr	03/12/46	28/07/47	
Air Marshal D Macfadyen	A/Cdre	28/07/47	17/12/47	AOC in Chief Home Command
Air Marshal Sir A McKee	A/Cdre	17/12/47	12/10/48	AOC in Chief Transport Command
Group Captain F C Sturgiss	Gp Capt	12/10/48	02/04/51	
Group Captain H L Parker	Gp Capt	02/04/51	02/07/51	
Group Captain J N Jefferson	Gp Capt	02/07/51	21/07/53	
Air Vice Marshal E J Corbally	A/Cdre	21/07/53	18/01/54	AOC No 61 Group(Southern)
Wing Commander A J Hicks	Wg Cdr	18/01/54	08/03/54	
Group Captain W G Devas	Wg Cdr	08/03/54	04/12/54	
Wing Commander C A R Crews	Wg Cdr	04/12/54	09/05/55	
Wing Commander A N Jones	Wg Cdr	09/05/55	30/10/57	
Wing Commander H D U Denison	Wg Cdr	30/10/57	09/04/62	

== Squadrons ==
During its relatively short life, RAF Hornchurch became home^{[a]} to many RAF squadrons:

Squadron	Squadron codes	Equipment	From	To		Commanding Officer
No. 39 Squadron		Royal Aircraft Factory B.E.2c	15/04/16	09/17	North Weald	Maj Thomas Higgins
No. 78 Squadron		Sopwith Camel	09/17	31/12/19	Disbanded	Maj Cuthbert Rowden
No. 189 Squadron		Sopwith Camel	4/18	01/03/19	Disbanded	Maj H S Powell
No. 111 Squadron		Armstrong Whitworth Siskin IIIA	01/04/28			Sqn Ldr Keith Park
No. 111 Squadron		Bristol Bulldog IIA	01/31	12/07/34	Northolt	
No. 41 Squadron	EB	Supermarine Spitfire Mk I	28/05/40	08/06/40	Catterick	Sqn Ldr HRL 'Robin' Hood
No. 41 Squadron	EB	Supermarine Spitfire Mk I	26/07/40	08/08/40	Catterick	Sqn Ldr HRL 'Robin' Hood
No. 41 Squadron	EB	Supermarine Spitfire Mk I	03/09/40	24/10/40	N/A	Sqn Ldrs HRL 'Robin' Hood DFC, Robert Lister & Don Finlay
No. 41 Squadron	EB	Supermarine Spitfire Mk IIa	24/10/40	23/02/41	Catterick	Sqn Ldr Donald O. Finlay
No. 54 Squadron	DL (KL)	Bristol Bulldog IIA	15/01/30			Sqn Ldr W E G Bryant
No. 54 Squadron	DL (KL)	Gloster Gauntlet	09/36			Sqn Ldr Cecil Bouchier
No. 54 Squadron	DL (KL)	Gloster Gladiator	05/37			Sqn Ldr H M Pearson
No. 54 Squadron	DL (KL)	Supermarine Spitfire Mk I	03/03/39	03/09/40	Catterick	Sqn Ldr James Leathart
No. 54 Squadron	DL (KL)	Supermarine Spitfire Mk IIa	23/02/41			Sqn Ldr F.P.R. Dunworth
No. 54 Squadron	DL (KL)	Supermarine Spitfire Mk Va	05/41			Sqn Ldr R F Boyd
No. 54 Squadron	DL (KL)	Supermarine Spitfire Mk Vb	07/41	17/11/41	Castletown	Sqn Ldr N Orton
No. 65 (East India) Squadron		Hawker Demon	12/07/34			
No. 65 (East India) Squadron		Gloster Gauntlet	09/36			
No. 65 (East India) Squadron	FZ	Gloster Gladiator	04/37			
No. 65 (East India) Squadron	FZ, YT	Supermarine Spitfire Mk I	21/03/39	27/08/40	Turnhouse	Sqn Ldr A L Holland
No. 74 (Trinidad) Squadron		Hawker Demon	21/09/36			Sqn Ldr Donald Brookes
No. 74 (Trinidad) Squadron		Gloster Gauntlet	04/37			Sqn Ldr Donald Brookes
No. 74 (Trinidad) Squadron	JH, ZP	Supermarine Spitfire Mk I	13/02/39	14/08/40	Wittering	Sqn Ldr Donald Brookes
No. 222 (Natal) Squadron	ZD	Supermarine Spitfire Mk I	30/08/40	11/11/40	Coltishall	Sqn Ldr John Hamar Hill
No. 222 (Natal) Squadron	ZD	Supermarine Spitfire Mk IX	29/04/43	30/12/43	Woodvale	Sqn Ldr E J F Harrington
No. 222 (Natal) Squadron	ZD	Supermarine Spitfire Mk IX	10/03/44	04/04/44	Selsey	
No. 266 (Rhodesia) Squadron	UO	Supermarine Spitfire Mk I	14/08/40	21/08/40	Wittering	Sqn Ldr R L Wilkinson
No. 600 (City of London) Squadron AAF	BQ	Bristol Blenheim	22/08/40	15/09/40	Redhill	Sqn Ldr David Clark
No. 600 (City of London) Squadron AAF	BQ	Bristol Beaufighter Mk 1F	01/09/40	15/09/40	Redhill	Sqn Ldr David Clark
No. 264 (Madras Presidency) Squadron	PS	Boulton Paul Defiant	22/08/40	28/08/40	Duxford	
No. 603 (City of Edinburgh) Squadron AAF	XT	Supermarine Spitfire Mk	27/08/40			Sqn Ldr G.L. Denholm, DFC
No. 64 Squadron	XQ (SH)	Supermarine Spitfire Mk IIa	11/11/40	16/05/41	Turnhouse	
No. 64 Squadron	XQ (SH)	Supermarine Spitfire Mk Vb	16/11/41	28/03/43	Turnhouse	
No. 313 (Czechoslovak) Squadron	RY	Supermarine Spitfire Mk Vb	15/12/41	08/06/42	Church Stanton	Sqn Ldr Karel Mrázek, DSO, DFC
No. 313 (Czechoslovak) Squadron	RY	Supermarine Spitfire Mk Vc	15/12/41	08/06/42	Church Stanton	Sqn Ldr Karel Mrázek, DSO, DFC Sqn Ldr František Fajtl, DFC (5 December 1941 – 27 April 1942)
No. 122 (Bombay) Squadron	WM (MT)	Supermarine Spitfire Mk Vc	01/04/42			Sqn Ldr František Fajtl, DFC (27 April – 5 May 1942)
No. 122 (Bombay) Squadron	WM (MT)	Supermarine Spitfire Mk IX	03/10/42	18/05/43	Eastchurch	

The following squadrons were also here at some point:

- No. 13 Squadron RAF
- No. 19 Squadron RAF
- No. 23 Squadron RAF
- No. 46 Squadron RAF
- No. 51 Squadron RAF
- No. 66 Squadron RAF
- No. 80 Squadron RAF
- No. 81 Squadron RAF
- No. 92 (East India) Squadron RAF
- No. 114 (Hong Kong) Squadron RAF
- No. 116 Squadron RAF
- No. 129 (Mysore) Squadron RAF
- No. 132 (City of Bombay) Squadron RAF
- No. 154 (Motor Industries) Squadron RAF
- No. 167 (Gold Coast) Squadron RAF
- No. 229 Squadron RAF
- No. 239 Squadron RAF
- No. 274 Squadron RAF
- No. 278 Squadron RAF
- No. 287 Squadron RAF
- No. 340 (GC IV/2 'IIe de France) Squadron RAF
- No. 349 (Belgian) Squadron RAF
- No. 350 (Belgian) Squadron RAF
- No. 403 Squadron RCAF
- No. 411 Squadron RCAF
- No. 453 Squadron RAAF
- No. 485 Squadron RNZAF
- No. 504 (County of Nottingham) Squadron AAF
- No. 567 Squadron RAF
- No. 611 (West Lancashire) Squadron AAF
- No. 661 Squadron RAF
- 765 Naval Air Squadron

Additional units:

- No. 1 Civilian Anti-Aircraft Co-operation Unit RAF
- No. 11 Group Anti-Aircraft Co-operation Flight RAF
- No. 17 Reserve Flying School RAF
- No. 20 (Fighter) Wing RAF
- No. 25 (Base Defence) Sector RAF
- No. 25 (Base) Defence Wing RAF
- No. 33 Personnel Despatch Centre RAF
- No. 135 Airfield Headquarters RAF (1944)
- No. 142 Gliding School RAF
- No. 146 Gliding School RAF
- No. 160 Wing RAF
- No. 412 (Polish) Repair & Salvage Unit
- No. 614 Gliding School RAF
- No. 1959 Air Observation Post Flight RAF
- No. 2718 Squadron RAF Regiment
- No. 2726 Squadron RAF Regiment
- No. 4012 Anti-Aircraft Flight RAF Regiment
- Aircrew Selection Centre
- Aviation Candidates Selection Board
- Combined Selection Centre
- Home Counties Gliding Centre
- Officers Advanced Training School

== See also ==
- Battle of Britain
- List of Battle of Britain airfields
- List of Battle of Britain squadrons
- List of former Royal Air Force stations
