= Mardee Vosseler =

Mardee Vosseler was a European-born ballerina, a protégé of Catherine Littlefield and sister of ballerina Heidi Vosseler. She performed in La Traviata, Carmen and William Sena's Scene dansante (to music of Gounod’s Faust) with the Philadelphia La Scala Opera Company at the Academy of Music. Vosseler died in November, 1941, of injuries sustained in a car crash near Camden, New Jersey.
