= Heidi Vosseler =

American ballerina

Heidi Vosseler (1918–1992) was an American ballerina who trained under Catherine Littlefield in her hometown of Philadelphia before becoming a member of George Balanchine's first American ballet company, American Ballet in 1934. She performed in his first American ballet, Serenade, in his Alma Mater, in two productions he choreographed for the Metropolitan Opera, and was featured in two Broadway musicals he choreographed, The Boys from Syracuse and Louisiana Purchase in which she understudied and appeared for Vera Zorina. Her sister Mardee was also a ballerina.

Miss Vosseler married tap dancer Paul Draper on June 23, 1941, in Rio de Janeiro and lived with him in Europe until returning to the United States in 1954. They had three daughters, Pamela, Susan and Kate. She died of lung cancer at her home in Woodstock, NY, 74 years old.
