= 30th Air Defense Missile Squadron =

30th Air Defense Missile Squadron (later 30th Tactical Missile Squadron)
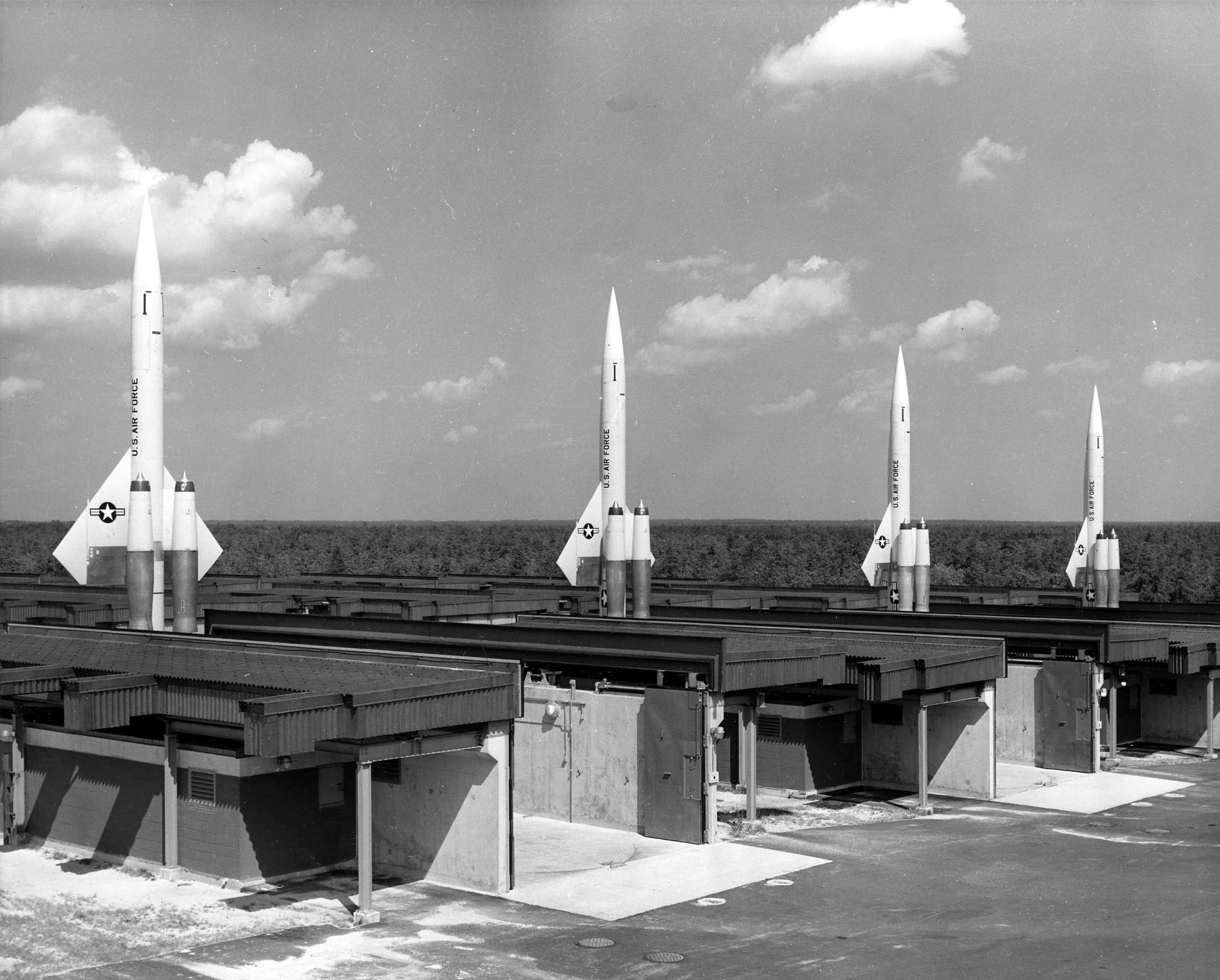
- A CIM-10 Bomarc missile battery at Fort Dix
- Active: 1943–1945; 1952–1958; 1959–1964
- Country: United States
- Branch: United States Air Force
- Role: Light bomber, Tactical missile, Air defense missile
- Size: Squadron
- Motto(s): Seek and Destroy (1960-1964)
- Mascot(s): "Sureshot Sully" (WW II era)
- Engagements: European Theater of Operations
- Decorations: Distinguished Unit Citation; Air Force Outstanding Unit Award

Insignia
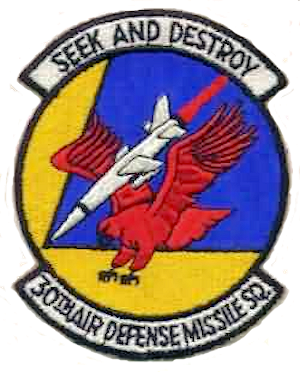
- Patch with the 30th Air Defense Missile Squadron emblem (Note: Approved 21 June 1960. Description: On an Air Force golden yellow disc a wide Air Force blue pile issuing from sinister and sinister chief, surmounted by a red falcon, wings raised in flight, swooping to attack, his left wing surmounted by a white stylized missile in flight to dexter base, jet trail red; outlines and details black throughout. Significance: On a background of the Air Force colors, ultramarine blue and golden yellow, a falcon and a modern missile swoop downward together to attack. The falcon, in power of flight and speed, is probably not surpassed by any living bird. Cutting the air with hissing velocity, it overtakes its quarry in mid-air and strikes it a quick, terrific blow with its hard, closed fist, or reaches out and grabs it with long-curved talons; either the blow or the grip brings instant death. The falcon represents the characteristics of the missile which is ready to attack and destroy the adversary in much the same manner, in the defense of this nation's freedom.)

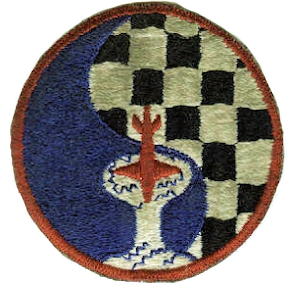
- Patch with the 69th Tactical Missile Squadron emblem

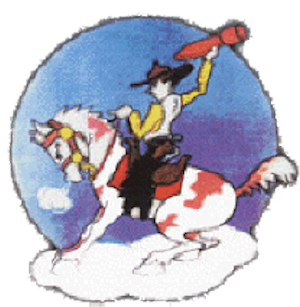
- 669th Bombardment Squadron emblem (Note: Approved 28 July 1943. Description: Over and through a light blue disc, thin border red piped white, a caricatured figure, "Sure Shot Sully," in western costume, consisting of brown hat, yellow shirt, white vest, gray trousers, black chaps, and brown holster about the waist with black and white revolver handle protruding from holster, standing in saddle over red saddle cloth strapped about the back of a caricatured tan and white pinto pony, snorting steam proper, and perched on a white cloud formation in base; orange aerial bomb being held aloft and hurled by right hand of "Sully.")
- ETO fuselage code: 2A

The 30th Air Defense Missile Squadron is an inactive United States Air Force unit. In 1985 the squadron was combined with two other United States Air Force and Army Air Forces units that had served in World War II and the Cold War into a single unit as the 30th Tactical Missile Squadron. However, the combined unit has not since been active.

The consolidated squadron was first active during World War II as the 669th Bombardment Squadron. For most of 1943, the squadron served as a training unit, but in September, it began training for overseas movement to England, where it served in combat as part of Ninth Air Force and earned a Distinguished Unit Citation for action in France in 1944. After the surrender of Germany, the squadron prepared for redeployment to the Pacific, but returned to the United States, where it was inactivated.

The second unit was activated in 1952 as the 69th Pilotless Bomber Squadron, a tactical missile unit. It initially participated in the test and development of the Martin TM-61 Matador missile as part of Air Research and Development Command. It became part of Tactical Air Command, and trained until it deployed to Europe, where it stood alert as a part of United States Air Forces Europe. It was inactivated in 1958 and its mission, personnel, and mission were transferred to the 405th Tactical Missile Squadron.

The 30th Air Defense Missile Squadron was activated in 1959 and was assigned to the Bangor Air Defense Sector of Aerospace Defense Command near Dow Air Force Base, Maine. In maintained air defense alert there with CIM-10 Bomarc missiles until it was inactivated in 1964.

== History ==
=== World War II ===
==== Organization and training in the United States ====
The squadron was first activated in 1943 as the 669th Bombardment Squadron (Light) at Will Rogers Field, Oklahoma, one of the four original squadrons assigned to the 416th Bombardment Group. The unit drew its initial cadre from the 51st Bombardment Squadron of the 46th Bombardment Group at Will Rogers, and its aircrews continued to fly with the 46th group until 11 May, when it received its first two planes.

The 669th moved to Lake Charles Army Air Field in June, where it began its training mission as a North American B-25 Mitchell medium bomber Operational Training Unit under Third Air Force. The operational training program involved the use of an oversized unit to provide cadres to "satellite groups." On 25 July, the unit began to transfer personnel to what would be the first group organized from is parent 416th group, the 418th Bombardment Group.

In September 1943, the squadron's mission changed when it converted to Douglas A-20 Havoc light attack bombers and trained in attack and light bombardment tactics. When the squadron mission changed, the 418th group it had recently helped spin off was disbanded and the personnel returned to the 416th group. The squadron suffered three accidents during training at Lake Charles, all during the month of October. Two of the crews were lost when one plane disappeared into the Gulf of Mexico and another suffered a mid-air collision with a plane of the 671st Bombardment Squadron.

==== Combat in the European Theater ====
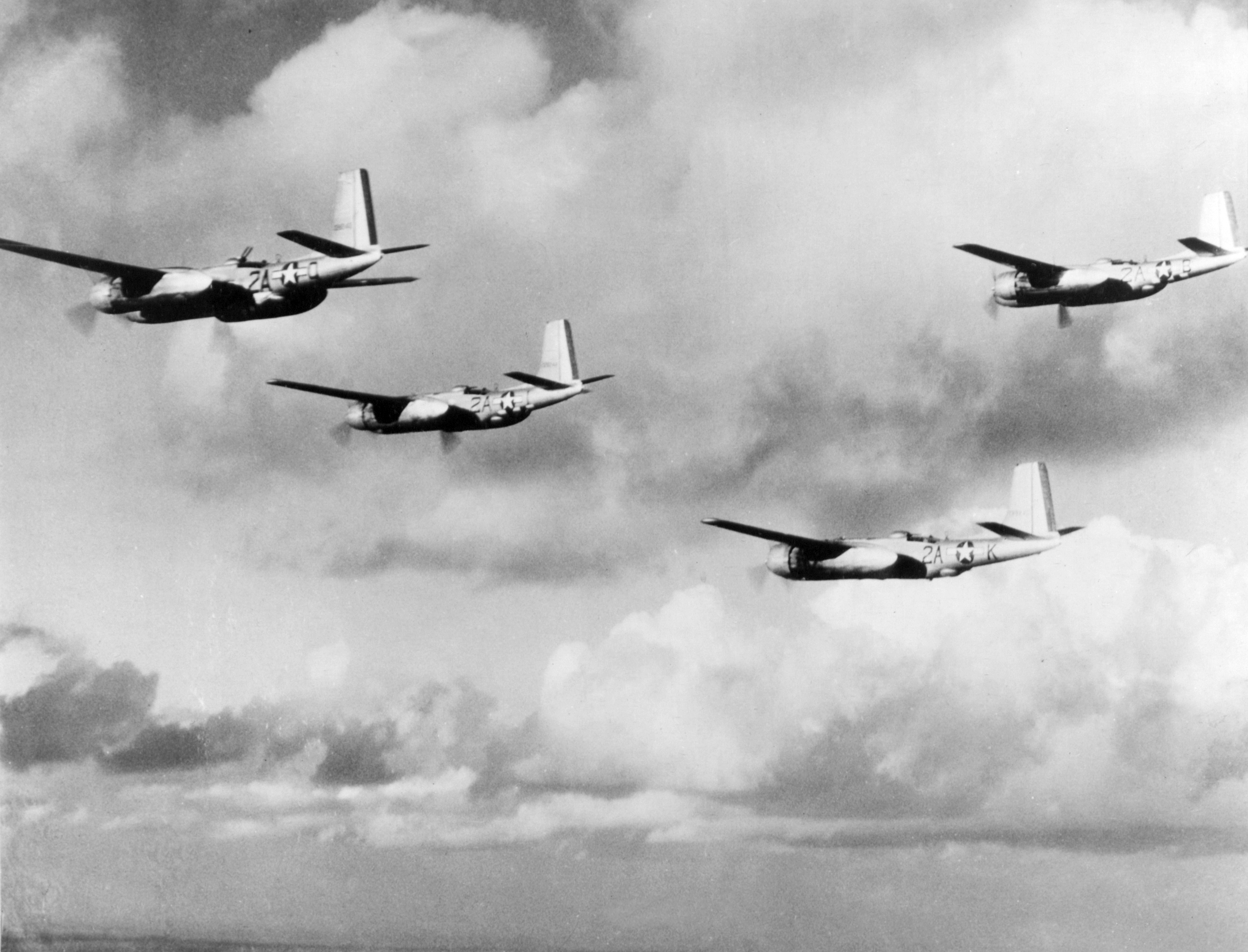
A-26 Invaders of the 669th Bomb Squadron, 1945

The squadron departed its final training base at Laurel Army Air Field on New Year's Day of 1944 for the overseas staging area of Camp Shanks, New York, arriving two days later. The squadron remained at the New York Port of Embarkation until 18 January, when it sailed for the European Theater of Operations, where it became part of Ninth Air Force in England. It arrived at its station, RAF Wethersfield, on 2 February, and its first A-20G airplane arrived eight days later. The squadron was assigned the fuselage code 2A and, along with the rest of the group adopted a white diagonal stripe along the trailing edge of its aircraft's tails.

The 669th engaged in diversionary attacks over the English Channel the first two days of March, and on the third flew its first attack on the continent against the airfield at Poix, France. From England, the squadron engaged in tactical bombardment of enemy targets mainly in coastal areas of France and the Low Countries. It attacked V-1 flying bomb sites in France. It flew a number of missions against airfields (Note: At least one of these airfields, Cormeilles en Vexin Airfield, would be occupied by the squadron after the Normandy invasion. 669th History.) and coastal defenses to help prepare for Operation Overlord, the invasion of Normandy. During April, it flew a mission supporting Martin B-26 Marauders in which it dropped window to confuse enemy air defenses over the target area. The 669th supported Operation Overlord, the invasion of Normandy in June 1944 by striking road junctions, marshalling yards, bridges, and railway overpasses. It assisted ground forces at Caen and St Lo in July and at Brest later in the summer by hitting transportation facilities, supply dumps, radar installations, and other targets.

In spite of intense resistance, which shot down two of the squadron aircraft in the first attacking formation, the unit bombed a railroad junction at Frevent, bridges, rolling stock, and a radar station to disrupt the enemy's retreat through the Falaise gap in August, and was awarded a Distinguished Unit Citation for this action. The squadron assisted in Operation Market Garden, the airborne attack on the Netherlands, in September. It then supported the assault on the Siegfried Line by pounding transportation, warehouses, supply dumps, and defended villages in Germany. By the following month, it became apparent that the advance of Allied forces on the continent made it operationally necessary for light bomber units like the 669th to be located east of Paris to support ground forces. Accordingly, the squadron moved to an advanced landing ground at a former Luftwaffe base, Melun/Villaroche Airfield, about 115 miles behind the front. It flew its first mission from the new base on 27 September.

The squadron converted to Douglas A-26 Invader aircraft in November 1944, receiving its first four A-26s on the last day of September. Thirty-five days later, on 5 November, the squadron had completed its conversion to the faster Invader and was ready to fly missions with it. The 416th group was the first in the Army Air Forces to fly combat missions with the Invader, making its first attack on 16 November against Hagenau. Using its new aircraft, it attacked transportation facilities, strong points, communications centers, and troop concentrations during the Battle of the Bulge, from December 1944 to January 1945. The 669th aided the Allied thrust into Germany by continuing its strikes against transportation, communications, airfields, storage depots, and other objectives from February through May 1945. It bombed flak positions in support of Operation Varsity, the airborne assault across the Rhine, in March 1945.

==== Demobilization ====
The squadron flew its last combat mission on 3 May 1945 and ended combat with the surrender of Germany. Although personnel began to rotate back to the United States, the squadron maintained a training schedule in anticipation of being redeployed to the Pacific Theater of Operations. At the end of July the air echelon departed and the ground echelon of the squadron moved to Camp Chicago, about fifteen miles from the base at Laon/Athies Airfield in what was intended as preparation for a move to the Pacific.

After the Japanese surrender, the squadron endured a series of delays in shipment, finally returning to the US where it was inactivated at the port of embarkation in September.

=== Cold War cruise missile service ===
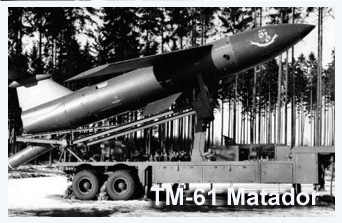
A TM-61 Matador on its launcher near Hahn Air Base

The squadron was established for the second time as the 69th Pilotless Bomber Squadron, a TM-61A Matador tactical surface-to-surface missile squadron in early 1952. It was the second squadron intended for eventual tactical deployment, and trained at Patrick Air Force Base under the supervision of the 6555th Guided Missiles Squadron, which was assigned to the 6555th Guided Missile Wing of Air Research and Development Command. Its TM-61 Matadors were designed to carry a nuclear warhead and after being rocket launched used a conventional jet engine to reach their targets. Training under the 6555th included individual training, followed by team training, where the individuals were joined and trained as crews. The final phase of training was conducted by the unit itself. Because of a shortage in training equipment and the earlier activation of the 1st Pilotless Bomber Squadron, the squadron's training was delayed until June. By the end of the year, the squadron was considered "basically trained." However, lack of systems equipment and training launch delays caused by problems with the Matador's performance delayed the squadron's planned deployment.

The squadron then moved to Orlando Air Force Base, Florida and Tactical Air Command to prepare for operational deployment. However, the 6555th continued to provide administrative and logistical support to the 69th. Just before transfer the unit had made its first three training launches. By the end of June it had launched thirty missiles at night, day, in adverse weather, and as part of multiple missile launches and its training was considered complete.

The squadron deployed to United States Air Forces in Europe and was assigned to Hahn Air Base in West Germany as part of the North Atlantic Treaty Organization's defense of western Europe. It became operational in October 1954. While at Hahn, it was redesignated as the 69th Tactical Missile Squadron. The squadron kept its missiles on alert from dispersed missile sites near Hahn until June 1958 when the squadron was inactivated and replaced at Hahn by the 405th Tactical Missile Squadron, which took over its personnel, equipment, and mission when the 701st Tactical Missile Wing and its component groups were inactivated and replaced by the 38th Tactical Missile Wing.

Dispersed Matador missile sites at Hahn Air Base

Hecken Missile Site
Koeterberg Missile Site(Site V "Pot Fuse") – 7.0 miles (11.3 km) ESE of Hahn AB 49°54′48″N 007°24′46″E (Note: This site was abandoned in 1961. The missile shelters were torn down and the site is very obscured by trees and other vegetation in a thick woodland area.)
Langenbrand Missile Site
Ludwigsturm Missile Site
Marsburg Missile Site
Wuescheim Missile Site(Site VI "Heroin") – 9.7 miles (15.6 km) NE of Hahn AB 50°02′37″N 007°25′32″E (Note: This site was transferred to the Army and converted into a Nike-Hercules Air Defense missile site. It was operational from 1970 to 1979. The area was transferred back to the USAF in 1982 and was converted into a cruise missile ground alert maintenance area for the 38th Tactical Missile Wing and was operational with BGM-109 Gryphon cruise missiles from 1985 to 1991.)
Zell Missile Site (later Idarkopf Missile Site)

=== Cold War air defense missile service ===
The third predecessor of the squadron activated on 1 June 1959 at Dow Air Force Base, Maine as the 30th Air Defense Missile Squadron It became operational in December 1960and stood alert during the Cold War with nuclear armed IM-99A (later CIM-10) BOMARC surface to air antiaircraft missiles. The Dow BOMARC site was the fourth of fourteen BOMARC sites to be constructed. The squadron was tied into a Semi-Automatic Ground Environment direction center operated by Bangor Air Defense Sector which used analog computers to process information from ground radars, picket ships and airborne warning aircraft to process tracking data at the direction center to quickly direct the missile site to engage hostile aircraft. The squadron never upgraded to the "B" model of the BOMARC, but became nonoperational on 1 December 1964, and was inactivated on 15 December 1964. The BOMARC missile site was located 4 miles (6.4 km) north-northeast of Dow AFB at 44°51′11″N 068°47′11″W. Although the missile site was geographically separated from the main base, it was administratively part of Dow AFB. The site still has its BOMARC missile shelters intact, which are being reused as an industrial park and are home to several small businesses.

=== Consolidation ===
The three squadrons were consolidated as the 30th Tactical Missile Squadron on 19 September 1985, while remaining inactive.

== Lineage ==
669th Bombardment Squadron

- Constituted as the 669th Bombardment Squadron (Light) on 25 Jan 1943

Activated on 5 Feb 1943
Redesignated as the 669th Bombardment Squadron, Light on 20 August 1943
Inactivated on 11 Oct 1945

- Consolidated on 19 September 1985 with the 30th Air Defense Missile Squadron and the 69th Tactical Missile Squadron as the 30th Tactical Missile Squadron

69th Tactical Missile Squadron

- Constituted as the 69th Pilotless Bomber Squadron (Light)

Activated on 10 January 1952
Redesignated as the 69th Tactical Missile Squadron on 8 June 1955
Inactivated on 18 June 1958

- Consolidated on 19 September 1985 with the 30th Air Defense Missile Squadron and the 669th Bombardment Squadron as the 30th Tactical Missile Squadron

30th Air Defense Missile Squadron

- Constituted as the 30th Air Defense Missile Squadron on 23 January 1959

Activated on 1 June 1959
Inactivated on 15 December 1964

- Consolidated on 19 September 1985 with the 69th Tactical Missile Squadron and the 669th Bombardment Squadron as the 30th Tactical Missile Squadron

=== Assignments ===
- 416th Bombardment Group, 5 February 1943 – 11 October 1945
- 6555th Guided Missiles Wing (later 6555th Guided Missile Wing, 6555th Guided Missile Group), 10 January 1952
- Tactical Air Command, 15 January 1954
- Twelfth Air Force, 30 September 1954 (attached to 50th Fighter-Bomber Wing 14 March 1955 – 15 April 1956, 7382d Guided Missile Group (later 7382d Tactical Missile Group), 15 April 1956 – 15 September 1956)
- 586th Tactical Missile Group, 15 September 1956 – 18 June 1958
- Bangor Air Defense Sector, 1 June 1959 – 15 December 1964

=== Stations ===
- Will Rogers Field, Oklahoma, 5 February 1943
- Lake Charles Army Air Field, Louisiana, 4 June 1943
- Laurel Army Air Field, Mississippi, 1 November 1943 – 1 January 1944
- RAF Wethersfield (AAF Station 170), England, 2 February 1944
- Melun/Villaroche Airfield (A-55), France, 25 September 1944
- Laon/Athies Airfield (A-69), France, 10 February 1945
- Cormeilles en Vexin Airfield (A-59), France, c. 25 May 1945
- Laon/Athies Airfield (A-69), France, 27 July 1945 – 13 September 1945
- Camp Myles Standish, Massachusetts, 10 October 1945 – 11 October 1945
- Patrick Air Force Base, Florida, 10 January 1952
- Orlando Air Force Base, Florida, 17 February 1954
- Hahn Air Base, Germany, 30 September 1954 – 18 June 1958
- Dow Air Force Base, Maine 1 June 1959 – 1 December 1964

=== Awards and campaigns ===
Award streamer	Award	Dates	Notes
	Distinguished Unit Citation	6 August 1944–9 August 1944	669th Bombardment Squadron, France
	Air Force Outstanding Unit Award	1 November 1962–31 March 1963	69th Tactical Missile Squadron

Campaign Streamer	Campaign	Dates	Notes
	Air Offensive, Europe	2 February 1944 – 5 June 1944	669th Bombardment Squadron
	Normandy	6 June 1944 – 24 July 1944	669th Bombardment Squadron
	Northern France	25 July 1944 – 14 September 1944	669th Bombardment Squadron
	Rhineland	15 September 1944 – 21 March 1945	669th Bombardment Squadron
	Ardennes-Alsace	16 December 1944 – 25 January 1945	669th Bombardment Squadron
	Central Europe	22 March 1944 – 21 May 1945	669th Bombardment Squadron
	Air Combat, EAME Theater	2 February 1944 – 11 May 1945	669th Bombardment Squadron

=== Aircraft and missiles ===
- North American B-25 Mitchell, 1943
- Doublas A-20 Havoc, 1943–1944
- Douglas A-26 Invader, 1944–1945
- Martin TM-61A Matador, 1952–1958
- Boeing IM-99A (later CIM-10A) BOMARC, 1959–1964

== See also ==
- List of United States Air Force missile squadrons
