= 670th Bombardment Squadron =

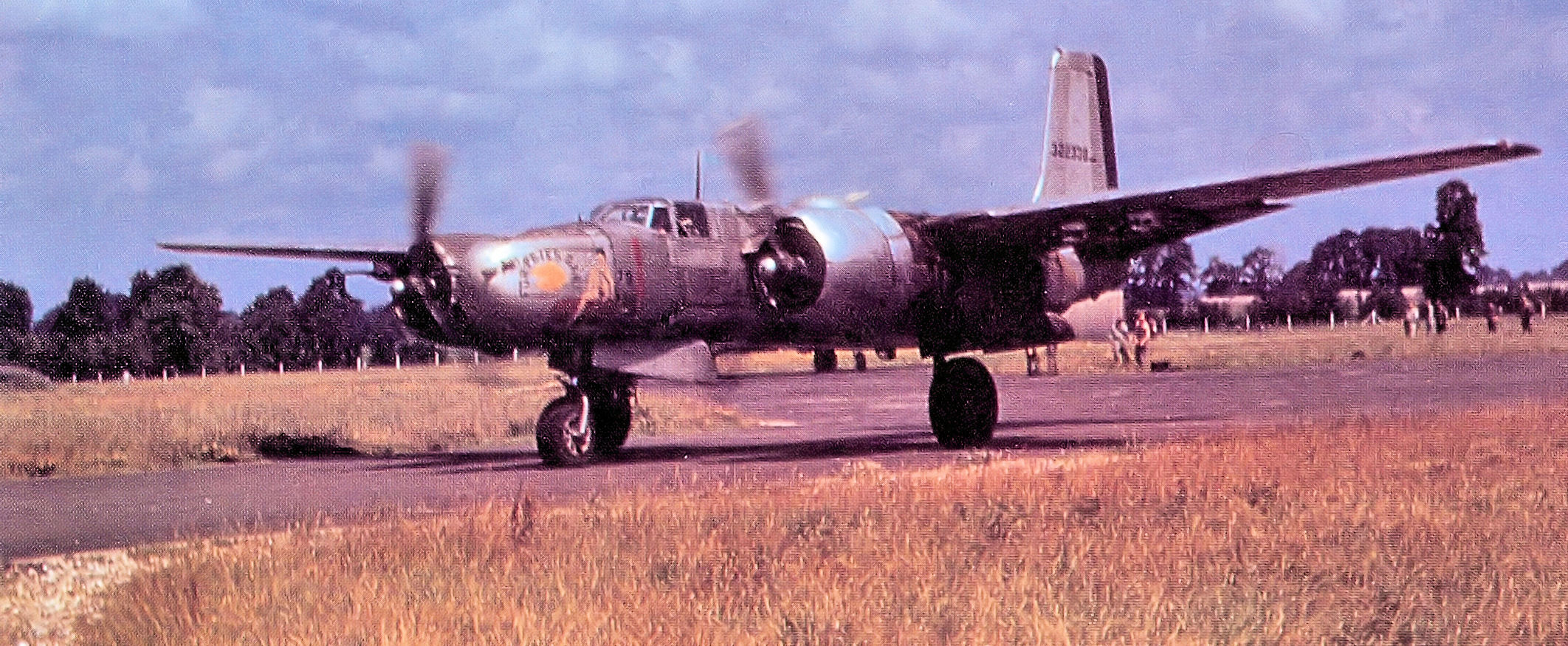
- 416th Bombardment Group Douglas A-26 Invader 1945
- Active: 1943-1945
- Country: United States
- Branch: United States Air Force
- Role: Light bomber
- Mascot: Beaky the Bomber
- Decorations: Distinguished Unit Citation

Insignia
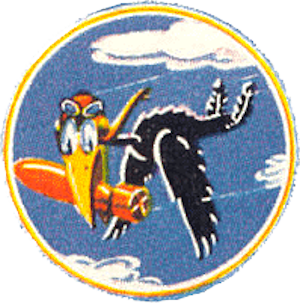
- 670th Bombardment Squadron emblem (Note: Approved 28 July 1943. Description: On a light blue disc, border of three alternate bands blue, white, and orange, piped at inner side with white, a black caricatured crow (Beaky the Bomber), in flight, having yellow bill, and wearing an orange aviator's helmet, goggles white, trimmed black, and carrying in the beak a large orange aerial bomb, all emitting speed lines white to rear, three white cloud formations, one in chief, one in sinister fess, and one in dexter base.)
- Fuselage code: F6

The 670th Bombardment Squadron is a former United States Army Air Forces unit, assigned to the 416th Bombardment Group. The squadron was activated a medium bomber unit during World War II. It trained in the United States before deploying to the European Theater of Operations, where it served with Ninth Air Force. It moved to the continent of Europe following D-Day and continued operations until the end of the war, earning a Distinguished Unit Citation for its actions in combat. It returned to the United States in the fall of 1945 and was inactivated at the port of embarkation.

== History ==
The squadron was first activated at Will Rogers Field, Oklahoma as one of the four original squadrons of the 416th Bombardment Group. Although designated as a light bomber unit, in June 1943 it moved to Lake Charles Army Air Field, Louisiana, where it was an Operational Training Unit for North American B-25 Mitchell medium bomber units. In September, the squadron equipped with Douglas A-20 Havoc light bombers and began to train with them for deployment the European Theater of Operations. The squadron departed the United States at the beginning of January 1944.

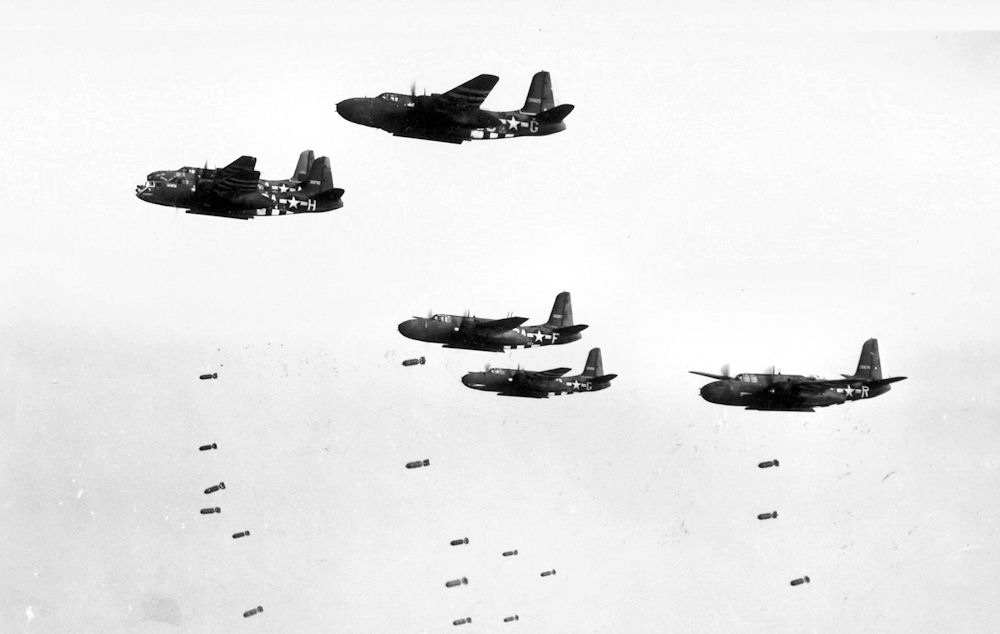
416th Group A-20s bombing

The squadron arrived at RAF Wethersfield, England, its first European station, in February 1944. Although its parent 416th Group was the first A-20 unit to be assigned to Ninth Air Force, its aircraft were transported by ship and lagged behind the ground and air echelons of the squadron. However, it was able to fly its first combat mission, a diversionary mission for heavy bombers flying in Operation Pointblank, on 3 March. Initially most of its missions were flown against V-1 flying bomb and V-2 rocket launch sites in France. It flew a number of missions against airfields and coastal defenses to help prepare for Operation Overlord, the invasion of Normandy. The unit supported the invasion in June 1944 by striking road junctions, marshalling yards, bridges, and railway overpasses.

The 670th assisted ground forces at Caen and supported Operation Cobra, the breakout at St Lo in July. Later in the summer it supported operations near Brest by hitting transportation facilities, supply dumps and radar installations. In spite of intense resistance, the squadron bombed bridges, (including one of the last bridges across the Seine at Oissel) railways, rolling stock and a radar station to disrupt the enemy's retreat through the Falaise Gap between 6 and 9 August, for which it was awarded a Distinguished Unit Citation. In September, the squadron provided support for Operation Market Garden, the airborne attack attempting to establish a bridgehead over the Rhine in the Netherlands. Later that month, it moved to Melun Airfield, France to reduce response times for ground support of the advancing Allied forces. It supported the assault on the Siegfried Line by with attacks on transportation, warehouses, supply dumps and defended villages in Germany.

At Melun, the squadron became part of the first group in IX Bomber Command to convert to the Douglas A-26 Invader. Initial plans to train one flight at a time, but this proved to be time consuming. It was the first of the 416th Squadrons to be taken off operations for conversion to the new plane, completing its transition on 17 October, although the group did not fly its first mission with the new plane on 17 November, attacking a depot at Haguenau. Because all Invaders delivered to the unit were solid nosed versions, it retained a few A-20s to lead boxes in formation bombing. It would not be until a mission on 8 February 1945 that the squadron would have sufficient glass nosed A-26s on hand to retire its A-20s from combat. During the Battle of the Bulge the following month, it used its new bomber to attack transportation facilities, strong points, communications centers and troop concentrations. This support lasted until January 1945. The squadron also aided the Allied advance into Germany by continuing its strikes against transportation, communications, airfields and storage depots. It bombed flak positions in support of Operation Varsity, the airborne assault across the Rhine, in March 1945 and continued operations until 3 May, when it flew its last mission of the war. The unit remained in Europe after V-E Day until September 1945, when it returned to the United States for inactivation at the port of embarkation on 11 October 1945.

== Lineage ==
- Constituted as the 670th Bombardment Squadron (Light) on 25 January 1943

Redesignated 670th Bombardment Squadron, Light on 20 August 1943
Activated on 5 February 1943
Inactivated on 11 October 1945

=== Assignments ===
- 416th Bombardment Group, 5 February 1943 – 11 October 1945

=== Stations ===
- Will Rogers Field, Oklahoma, 5 February 1943
- Lake Charles Army Air Field, Louisiana, 4 June 1943
- Laurel Army Air Field, Mississippi, 1 November 1943 – 1 January 1944
- RAF Wethersfield (AAF-170), England, 1 February 1944
- Melun Airfield (A-55), France, 21 September 1944
- Laon/Athies Airfield (A-69), France, 10 February 1945
- Cormeilles en Vexin Airfield (A-59), France, c. 25 May 1945
- Laon/Athies Airfield (A-69), France, 27 July–13 September 1945
- Camp Myles Standish, Massachusetts, 10–11 October 1945

=== Aircraft ===
- North American B-25 Mitchell, 1943
- Douglas A-20 Havoc, 1943–1944
- Douglas A-26 Invader, 1944–1945

=== Awards and campaigns ===
Award streamer	Award	Dates	Notes
	Presidential Unit Citation	6 August 1944-9 August 1944	France, 670th Bombardment Squadron

Campaign Streamer	Campaign	Dates	Notes
	Air Offensive, Europe	2 February 1944 – 5 June 1944	670th Bombardment Squadron
	Air Combat, EAME Theater	2 February 1944 – 11 May 1945	670th Bombardment Squadron
	Normandy	6 June 1944 – 24 July 1944	670th Bombardment Squadron
	Northern France	25 July 1944 – 14 September 1944	670th Bombardment Squadron
	Rhineland	15 September 1944 – 21 March 1945	670th Bombardment Squadron
	Ardennes-Alsace	16 December 1944 – 25 January 1945	670th Bombardment Squadron
	Central Europe	22 March 1944 – 21 May 1945	670th Bombardment Squadron

== See also ==
- List of A-26 Invader operators
- List of Douglas A-20 Havoc operators
