= 668th Bomb Squadron =

668th Bombardment Squadron
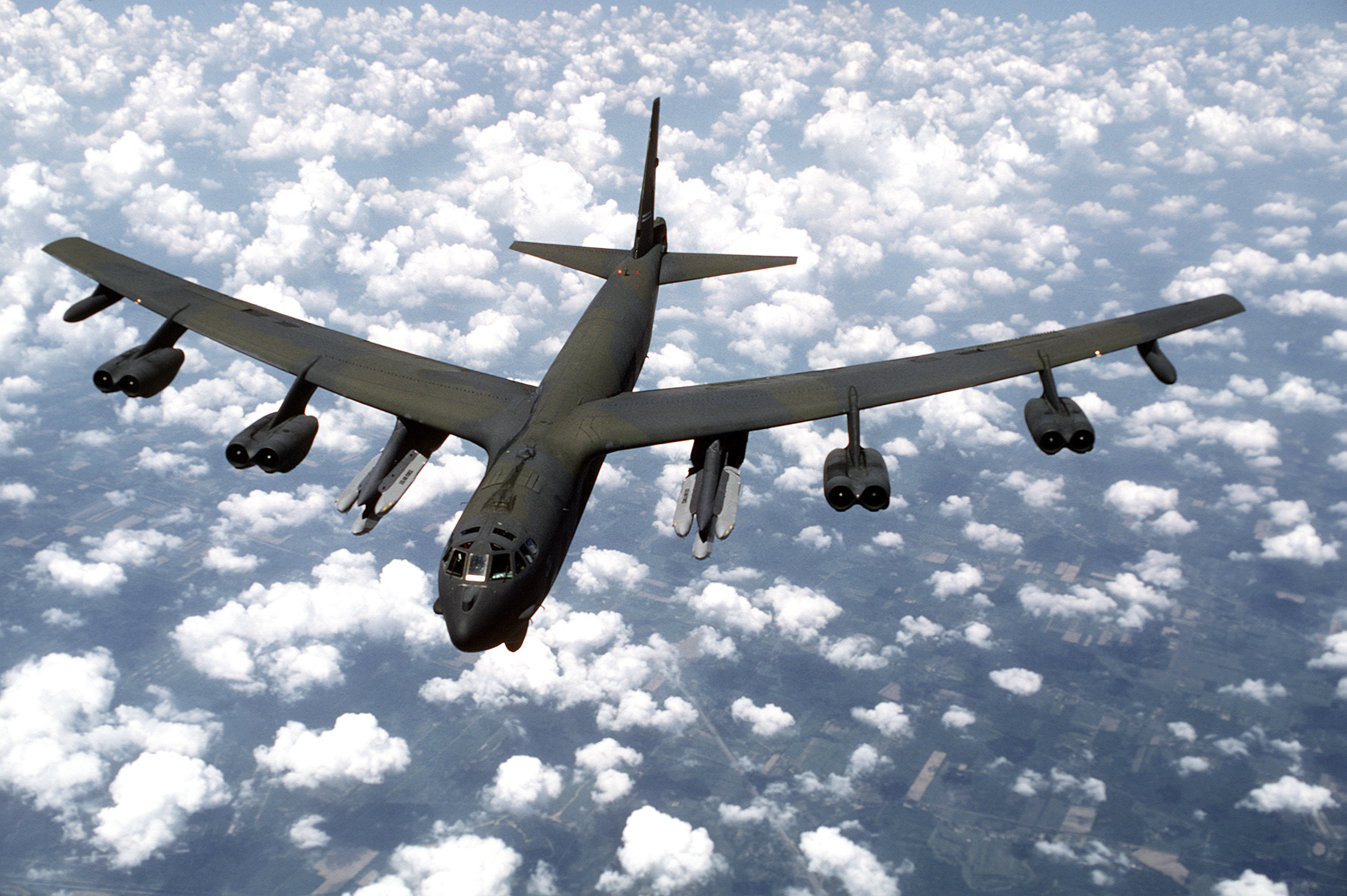
- A squadron B-52G Stratofortress armed with AGM-86B Air-Launched Cruise Missiles
- Active: 1943–1945; 1963–1995
- Country: United States
- Branch: United States Air Force
- Role: Heavy bomber
- Motto: We Maintain the Balance
- Engagements: European Theater of Operations
- Decorations: Distinguished Unit Citation; Air Force Outstanding Unit Award

Insignia
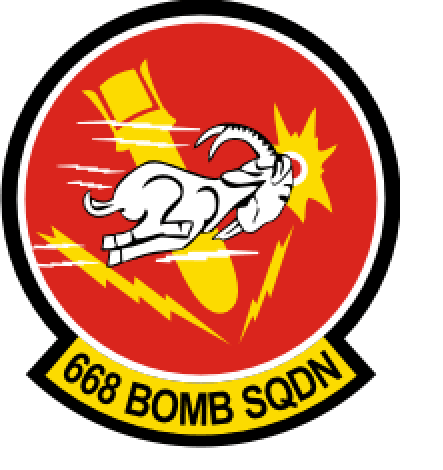
- 668 Bombardment Sq emblem (Note: Approved 3 June 1943. Description: On a red disc, border white, edged black, a caricatured white goat outlined black, running at top speed emitting white speed lines, and butting disc to form large impact marks in shape of irregular star yellow and white, all in front of and over a large aerial bomb yellow falling to sinister base, between two yellow lightning bolts, points to sinister base.)

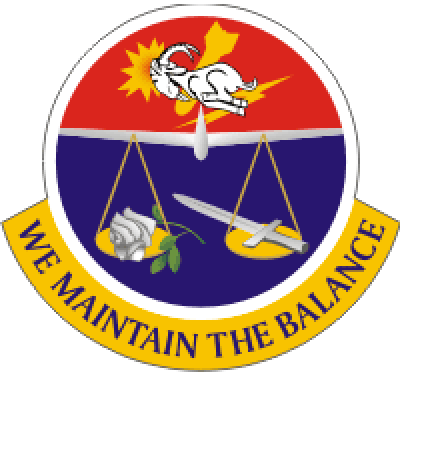
- 668 Bombardment Squadron emblem (1963)
- World War II fuselage code: 5H

The 668th Bomb Squadron is an inactive United States Air Force unit. It was last assigned to the 416th Operations Group at Griffiss Air Force Base, New York, where it was inactivated on 1 January 1995.

The squadron was first activated as the 668th Bombardment Squadron, a medium bomber unit during World War II. It trained in the United States before deploying to the European Theater of Operations, where it served with Ninth Air Force. It moved to the continent of Europe following D-Day and continued operations until the end of the war, earning a Distinguished Unit Citation for its actions in combat. It returned to the United States in the fall of 1945 and was inactivated at the port of embarkation.

The squadron was organized again under Strategic Air Command in 1963 and maintained its aircraft on nuclear alert until the end of the Cold War. Although the squadron itself did not see combat, it deployed aircrews and bombers to augment other forces during the Vietnam War and Desert Storm.

== History ==
=== World War II ===
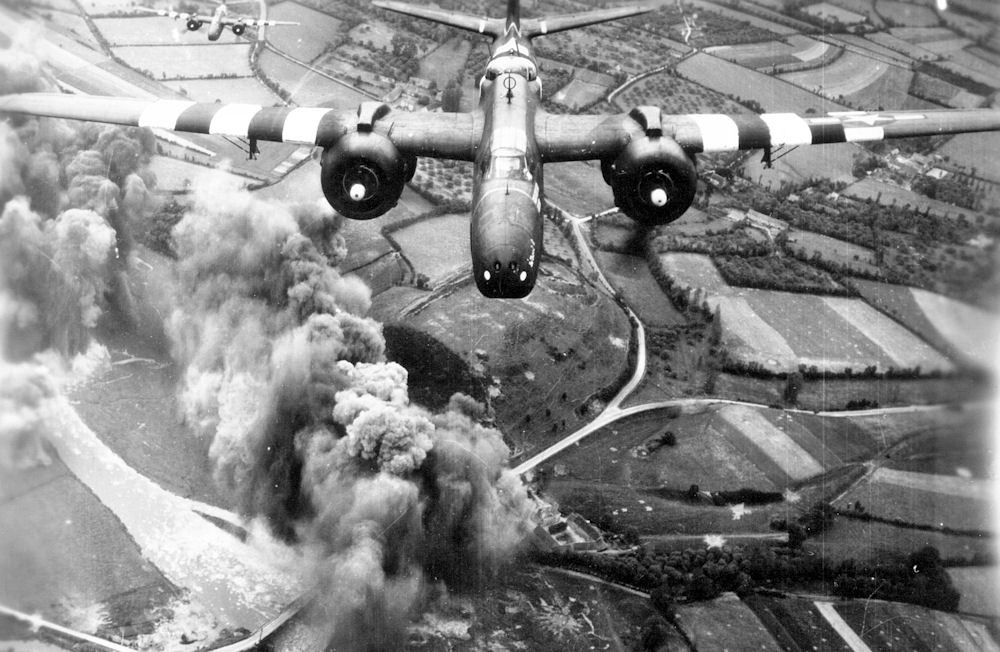
416th Group A-20 attacking targets on D Day

The squadron was first activated at Will Rogers Field, Oklahoma as the 668th Bombardment Squadron, one of the four original squadrons of the 416th Bombardment Group. Although designated as a light bomber unit, in June 1943 it moved to Lake Charles Army Air Field, Louisiana, where it was an Operational Training Unit for North American B-25 Mitchell medium bomber units. In September, the squadron equipped with Douglas A-20 Havoc light bombers and began to train with them for deployment the European Theater of Operations. The squadron departed the United States at the beginning of January 1944.

The squadron arrived at RAF Wethersfield, England, its first European station, in February 1944. Although its parent 416th Group was the first A-20 unit to be assigned to Ninth Air Force, its aircraft were transported by ship and lagged behind the ground and air echelons of the squadron. However, It was able to fly its first combat mission, a diversionary mission for heavy bombers flying in Operation Pointblank on 3 March. Initially most of its missions were flown against V-1 flying bomb and V-2 rocket launch sites in France. It flew a number of missions against airfields and coastal defenses to help prepare for Operation Overlord, the invasion of Normandy. The unit supported the invasion in June 1944 by striking road junctions, marshalling yards, bridges, and railway overpasses.

The 668th assisted ground forces at Caen and supported Operation Cobra, the breakout at St Lo in July. Later in the summer it supported operations near Brest by hitting transportation facilities, supply dumps and radar installations. In spite of intense resistance, the squadron bombed bridges, (including one of the last bridges across the Seine at Oissel) railways, rolling stock and a radar station to disrupt the enemy's retreat through the Falaise Gap between 6 and 9 August, for which it was awarded a Distinguished Unit Citation. In September, the squadron provided support for Operation Market Garden, the airborne attack attempting to establish a bridgehead over the Rhine in the Netherlands. Later that month, it moved to Melun Airfield, France to reduce response times for ground support of the advancing Allied forces. It supported the assault on the Siegfried Line by with attacks on transportation, warehouses, supply dumps and defended villages in Germany.

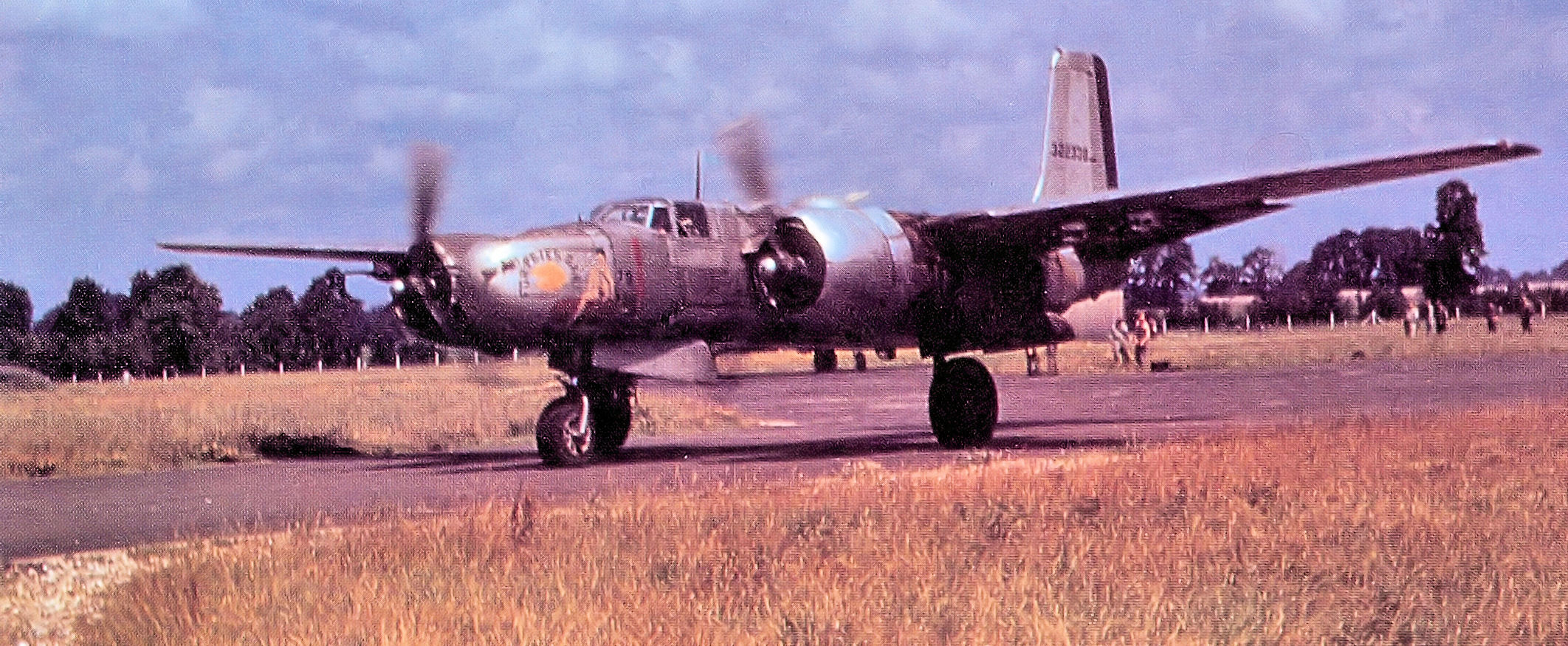
416th Group A-26 Invader at Laon/Athies Airfield

At Melun, the squadron became part of the first group in IX Bomber Command to convert to the Douglas A-26 Invader. It was taken off operations on 6 November, and flew its first mission with the new plane on 17 November, attacking a depot at Haguenau. Because all Invaders delivered to the unit were solid nosed versions, it retained a few A-20s to lead boxes in formation bombing. It would not be until a mission on 8 February 1945 that the squadron would have sufficient glass nosed A-26s on hand to retire its A-20s from combat. During the Battle of the Bulge the following month, it used its new bomber to attack transportation facilities, strong points, communications centers and troop concentrations. This support lasted until January 1945. The squadron also aided the Allied advance into Germany by continuing its strikes against transportation, communications, airfields and storage depots. It bombed flak positions in support of Operation Varsity, the airborne assault across the Rhine, in March 1945 and continued operations until 3 May, when it flew its last mission of the war. The unit remained in Europe after V-E Day until September 1945, when it returned to the United States for inactivation at the port of embarkation on 11 October 1945.

=== Strategic Air Command ===
In 1962, in order to perpetuate the lineage of many currently inactive bombardment units with illustrious World War II records, Strategic Air Command (SAC) received authority from Headquarters USAF to discontinue its Major Command controlled strategic wings that were equipped with combat aircraft and to activate Air Force controlled units, which could carry a lineage and history. (Note: MAJCON units could not carry a permanent history or lineage. Ravenstein, Guide to Air Force Lineage and Honors, p. 12) As a result, the 416th Bombardment Wing replaced the 4039th Strategic Wing at Griffiss Air Force Base, New York. The changes to the wing meant that the squadron was organized in February 1963, and took over the mission, personnel and equipment of the 75th Bombardment Squadron, which was simultaneously inactivated.

One half of the squadron's Boeing B-52G Stratofortress aircraft were maintained on fifteen minute alert, fully fueled and ready for combat to reduce vulnerability to a Soviet missile strike. The squadron continued the mission of strategic bombardment training to meet SAC commitments.

In June 1968, squadron aircrews began deploying to support Operation Arc Light and Linebacker missions in Southeast Asia. By this time, the number of aircraft on alert had decreased to 40 per cent (Note: This alert status was not uniform through the command. Wings committed to Arc Light had no alert bombers, while undeployed wings maintained normal alert status. Which category a specific wing fell into varied over time. Even when planes were available for alert, crews had rotated to the combat zone and they could not be manned. Alert Operations and SAC, pp. 24-25) Arc Light deployments continued until 1975. However, during the 1973 Yom Kippur War, concerns that the war would expand, leading SAC to increase the number of squadron aircraft on alert. This increased alert lasted only two days.

In 1979, the squadron participated in Exercise Global Shield 79. In this exercise. SAC exercised every phase of its role in the Single Integrated Operations Plan short of actual warfare. Over the command's bases, hundreds of bombers were brought up to alert status. Squadron aircraft and supporting personnel were dispersed to preselected bases and flew simulated nuclear missions from them. On 16 December 1982, the squadron became the first in SAC to place standoff AGM-86 Air Launched Cruise Missiles on its alert bombers.

The squadron began preparing for a conventional warfare role in 1988, although it maintained B-52s on nuclear alert until 28 September 1991. the squadron deployed crews and aircraft to Prince Abdullah Air Base, Saudi Arabia, during Operation Desert Shield from August 1990, then deployed B-52s to Moron Air Base, Spain; RAF Fairford, England; and Naval Support Facility Diego Garcia, from which they flew combat missions during Operation Desert Storm from January until April 1991.

The squadron was inactivated in 1995 as Griffiss closed following the recommendation of the 1993 Base Realignment and Closure Commission.

== Lineage ==
- Constituted as the 668th Bombardment Squadron (Light) on 25 January 1943

Redesignated 668th Bombardment Squadron, Light on 20 August 1943
Activated on 5 February 1943
Inactivated on 11 October 1945

- Redesignated the 668th Bombardment Squadron (Heavy) and activated on 15 November 1962 (not organized)

Organized on 1 February 1963
Redesignated 668th Bomb Squadron on 1 September 1991
Inactivated on 1 January 1995

=== Assignments ===
- 416th Bombardment Group, 5 February 1943 – 11 October 1945
- Strategic Air Command, 15 November 1962 (not organized)
- 416th Bombardment Wing, 1 February 1963
- 416th Operations Group, 1 September 1991 – 1 January 1995

=== Stations ===
- Will Rogers Field, Oklahoma, 5 February 1943
- Lake Charles Army Air Field, Louisiana, 4 June 1943
- Laurel Army Air Field, Mississippi, 1 November 1943 – 1 January 1944
- RAF Wethersfield (AAF-170), England, 2 February 1944
- Melun Airfield (A-55), France, 25 September 1944
- Laon/Athies Airfield (A-69), France, 10 February 1945
- Cormeilles en Vexin Airfield (A-59), France, c. 25 May 1945
- Laon/Athies Airfield (A-69), France, 27 July–13 September 1945
- Camp Myles Standish, Massachusetts, 10–11 October 1945
- Griffiss Air Force Base, New York, 1 February 1963 – 1 January 1995

=== Aircraft ===
- North American B-25 Mitchell, 1943
- Douglas A-20 Havoc, 1943–1944
- Douglas A-26 Invader, 1944–1945
- Boeing B-52G Stratofortress, 1963–1991
- Boeing B-52H Stratofortress, 1991–1995

=== Awards and campaigns ===
Award streamer	Award	Dates	Notes
	Presidential Unit Citation	6 August 1944-9 August 1944	France, 668th Bombardment Squadron
	Air Force Outstanding Unit Award	15 September 1981-31 October 1982	668th Bombardment Squadron
	Air Force Outstanding Unit Award	1 July 1984-30 June 1986	668th Bombardment Squadron
	Air Force Outstanding Unit Award	1 July 1989-30 June 1991	668th Bombardment Squadron

Campaign Streamer	Campaign	Dates	Notes
	Air Offensive, Europe	2 February 1944–5 June 1944	668th Bombardment Squadron
	Air Combat, EAME Theater	2 February 1944–11 May 1945	668th Bombardment Squadron
	Normandy	6 June 1944–24 July 1944	668th Bombardment Squadron
	Northern France	25 July 1944–14 September 1944	668th Bombardment Squadron
	Rhineland	15 September 1944–21 March 1945	668th Bombardment Squadron
	Ardennes-Alsace	16 December 1944–25 January 1945	668th Bombardment Squadron
	Central Europe	22 March 1944–21 May 1945	668th Bombardment Squadron
	Defense of Saudi Arabia	2 August 1990–16 January 1991	668th Bombardment Squadron
	Liberation and Defense of Kuwait	17 January 1991–11 April 1991	668th Bombardment Squadron

== See also ==
- List of B-52 Units of the United States Air Force
- List of A-26 Invader operators
- List of Douglas A-20 Havoc operators
