= 418th =

418th may refer to:

- 418th Bombardment Group, inactive United States Air Force unit
- 418th Flight Test Squadron (418 FLTS), part of the 412th Test Wing based at Edwards Air Force Base, California
- 418th Tactical Fighter Training Squadron, inactive United States Air Force unit

== See also ==
- 418 (number)
- 418, the year 418 (CDXVIII) of the Julian calendar
- 418 BC
