= 75th Bombardment Squadron =

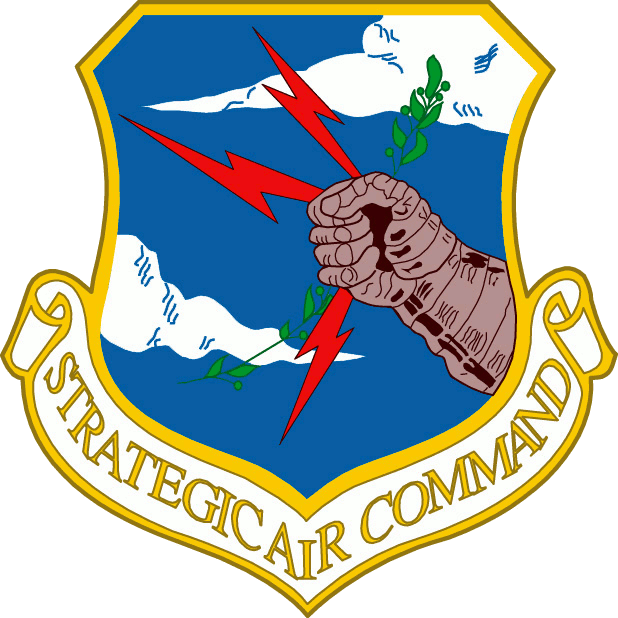
75th Bombardment Squadron

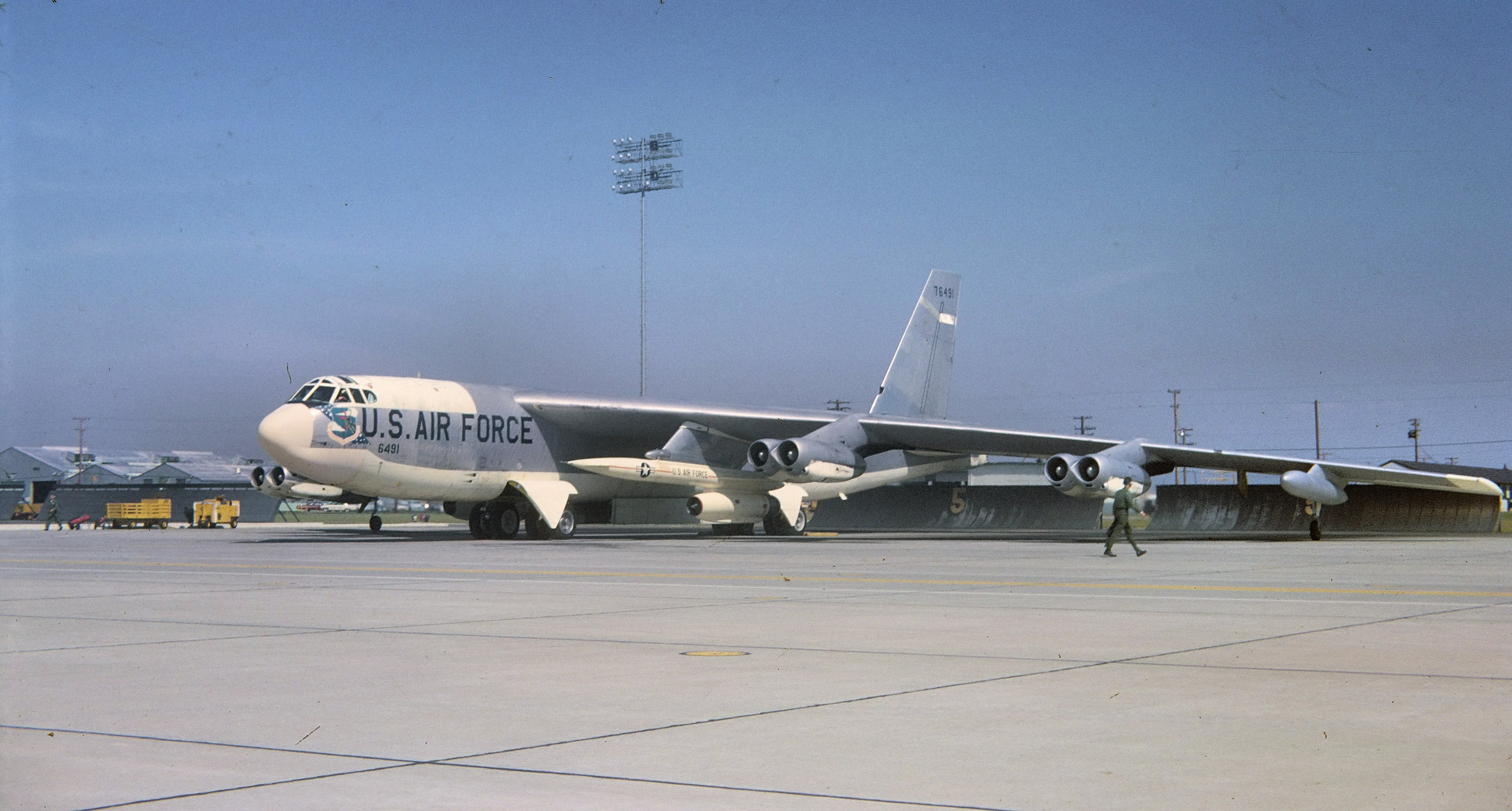
- SAC B-52G as flown by the 75th Bomb Squadron
- Active: 1941–1946; 1953–1963
- Country: United States
- Branch: United States Air Force
- Role: Bombardment
- Part of: Strategic Air Command
- Engagements: Southwest Pacific Theater
- Decorations: Distinguished Unit Citation; Philippine Presidential Unit Citation

Insignia
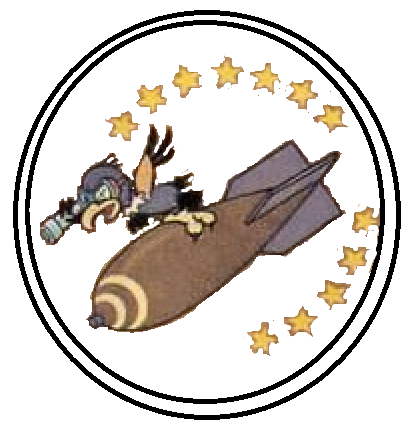
- 75th Bombardment Squadron emblem (approved 22 November 1943)

The 75th Bombardment Squadron is an inactive United States Air Force unit. It was first established as a bombardment squadron shortly before World War II. It was reactivated during the Cold War as a Strategic Air Command (SAC). Its last assignment was to the 4039th Strategic Wing at Griffiss Air Force Base, New York, where it was made inactive on 1 February 1963.

== History ==
=== World War II ===
Established as a pre-World War II GHQAF bombardment squadron, it was equipped with Douglas B-18 Bolos and early-model Martin B-26 Marauders. After the Japanese attack on Pearl Harbor, the squadron was engaged in anti-submarine operations over the mid-Atlantic coast. It was reassigned to the Third Air Force, but it deployed with the Fifth Air Force in Australia in 1942 as part of the re-equipping of that command, following the 1941–1942 Battle of the Philippines.

It then deployed to the South Pacific Area (SPA), being assigned to the Thirteenth Air Force and attacking enemy targets in the Solomon Islands, New Hebrides and other locations north and east of Papua New Guinea. It became part of General MacArthur's New Guinea campaign, supporting ground forces with the tactical bombing of enemy formations and targets along the northern coast of New Guinea and in the Dutch East Indies.

The squadron attacked enemy forces in the Philippines during early 1945 as part of the liberation from Japanese control; it continued combat missions until the Japanese capitulation in August 1945 and became part of Fifth Air Force in Occupied Japan in 1946 before being demobilized and inactivated in May 1946.

The 75th was awarded a Distinguished Unit Citation for its pre-invasion bombing of Balikpapan between 23 and 30 June 1945. Balikpapan was a center for oil refining on Borneo held by the Japanese. These attacks included bombing and strafing enemy shore installations. The round trip to the target was over 1700 miles and was among the longest flown by medium bombers during the war. Pre mission experiments determined that the squadron's bombers could carry a bomb load over this distance with fuel tanks installed in their radio compartments despite having to take off from a runway damaged by enemy action. Four of the missions encountered severe tropical weather fronts. Despite intense and accurate flak, the squadron destroyed gun positions, warehouses, roadblocks, fuel and ammunition dumps, a radar station as well as huge stores of gasoline and oil which the enemy had placed in position to be released into shallow pits oil the beach and ignited when the Australian ground troops made their assaults. The group attacked the beach while naval underwater demolition teams operated offshore without losing a man. The attacks were so effective that the Australian Seventh Division was able to come ashore without enemy opposition.

=== Cold War ===
It was reactivated as a Strategic Air Command (SAC) Convair B-36 Peacemaker bombardment squadron in 1953. The squadron was engaged in worldwide training missions with the B-36 until 1956 when it was re-equipped with the all jet-powered Boeing B-52 Stratofortress. It was reassigned to the SAC 4039th Strategic Wing in 1959 at Griffiss Air Force Base, New York, to disperse its heavy bomber force and conduct worldwide strategic bombardment training missions with a nuclear deterrent. SAC inactivated its Strategic Wings, including the 75th, replacing them with permanent Air Force Wings in 1963. The squadron was inactivated with aircraft/personnel/equipment being transferred to the 668th Bombardment Squadron.

== Lineage ==
- Constituted as the 75th Bombardment Squadron (Medium) on 20 November 1940

Activated on 15 January 1941
Inactivated on 10 May 1946

- Redesignated the 75th Bombardment Squadron, Heavy on 19 February 1953

Activated on 25 February 1953
Discontinued and inactivated on 1 Feb 1963

=== Assignments ===
- 42d Bombardment Group, 15 January 1941 – 10 May 1946
- 42d Bombardment Wing, 25 February 1953
- 4039th Strategic Wing, 15 October 1959 – 1 February 1963

=== Stations ===
- Fort Douglas, Utah, Utah, 15 January 1941
- Gowen Field, Idaho, 6 June 1941
- Portland Army Air Base, Oregon, 19 January 1942 – 15 March 1943;
- Plaine Des Gaiacs Airfield, New Caledonia, 18 April 1943
- Carney Airfield, Guadalcanal, Solomon Islands, 26 May 1943 (operated from Plaine Des Gaiacs Airfield until 17 July 1943)
- Russell Islands, 21 October 1943
- Stirling Airfield, Solomon Islands, c. 20 January 1944
- Hollandia Airfield Complex, New Guinea, 27 August 1944
- Sansapor Airfield, New Guinea, c. 20 September 1944

Operated from Wama Airfield, Morotai, Netherlands East Indies, 22 February – c. 20 March 1945

- Puerto Princesa Airfield, Palawan, Philippines, 22 March 1945
- Itami Air Base, Japan], 31 January – 10 May 1946
- Limestone Air Force Base (later Loring Air Force Base, Maine, 25 February 1953
- Griffiss Air Force Base, New York, 15 October 1959 – 1 February 1963

=== Aircraft ===
- Douglas B-18 Bolo, 1941–1942
- Lockheed A-29 Hudson, 1942
- Martin B-26 Marauder, 1941–1943
- North American B-25 Mitchell, 1943–1945
- Convair B-36 Peacemaker, 1953–1956
- Boeing B-52 Stratofortress, 1956–1963

== See also ==
- List of B-52 Units of the United States Air Force
