= 416th Air Expeditionary Wing =

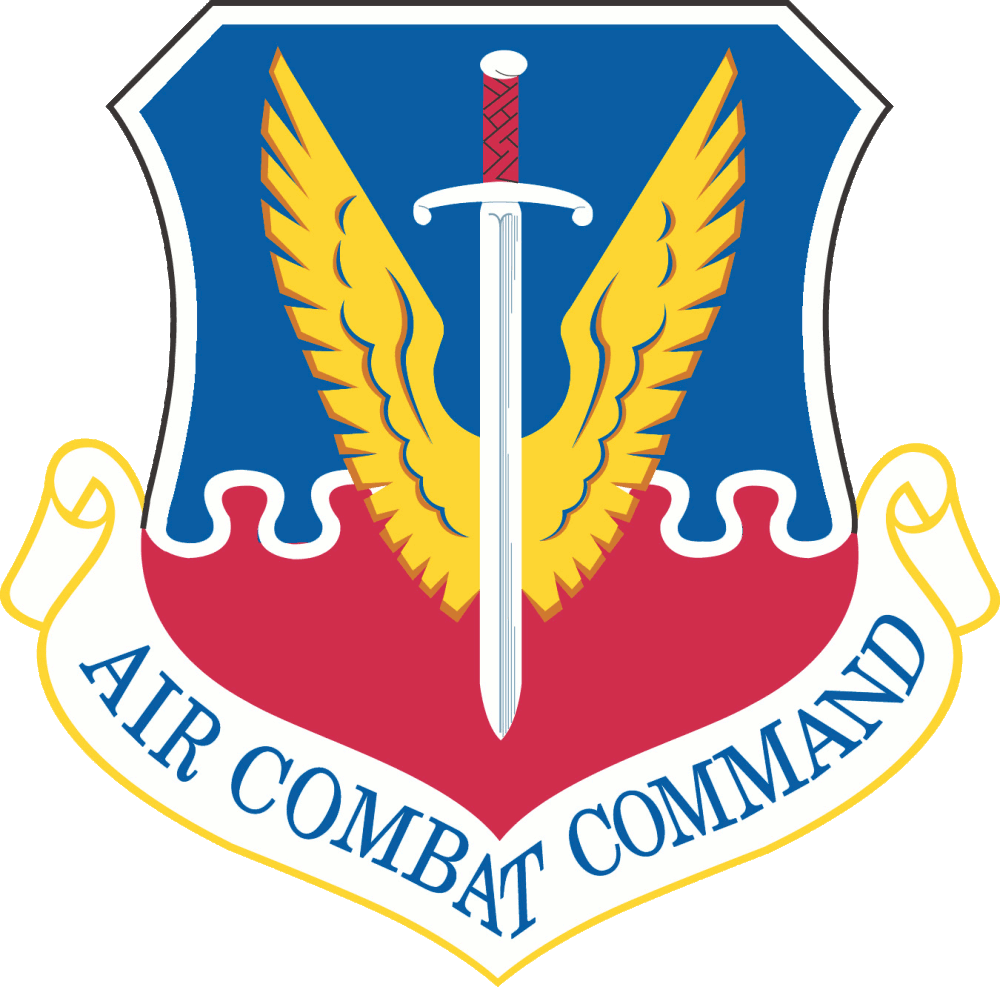
416th Air Expeditionary Wing

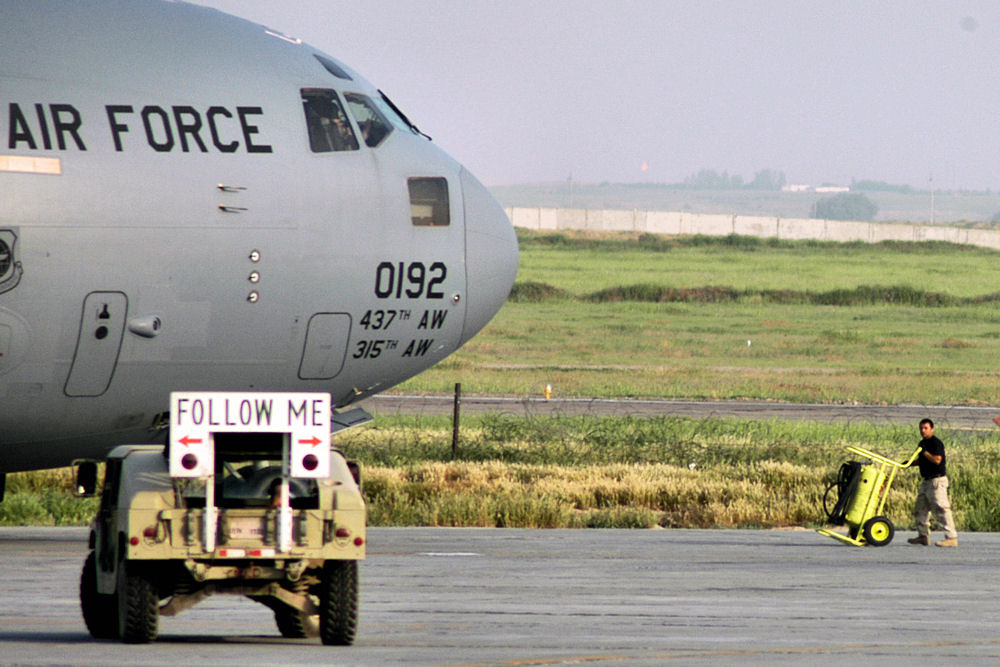
- A 416th Air Expeditionary Group airman positions a fire bottle while preparing a C-17 Globemaster III for parking
- Active: 1943–1945; 1962–1995; 2002–2005
- Country: United States
- Branch: United States Air Force
- Type: Air Expeditionary
- Role: Combat Support
- Engagements: European Theater of Operations; Southwest Asia
- Decorations: Distinguished Unit Citation; Air Force Outstanding Unit Award

Insignia
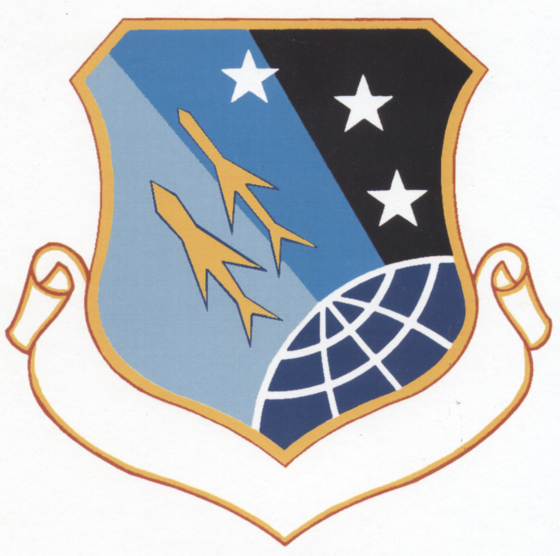
- 416th Air Expeditionary Wing emblem (Note: Approved 2 March 1964.)
- World War II Fuselage Identification Codes: 5H (668th Bomb Sq) 2A (669th Bomb Sq) F6 (670th Bomb Sq) 5C (671st Bomb Sq)
- ACC tail marking at Griffiss AFB: GR

The 416th Air Expeditionary Wing is a provisional unit assigned to the Air Combat Command of the United States Air Force to activate or inactivate as needed.

The wing began life in World War II as the 416th Bombardment Group. The group was a Douglas A-20 Havoc light bomb group assigned to Ninth Air Force in Western Europe. It was awarded a Distinguished Unit Citation for its actions in France when, in spite of intense resistance, the group bombed bridges, railways, rolling stock, and a radar station to disrupt the German retreat through the Falaise-Argentan gap. It converted to Douglas A-26 Invaders while engaged in combat and continued to support ground forces through the end of the war.

The group's heritage was continued by the 416th Bombardment Wing, a Strategic Air Command B-52 Stratofortress wing that conducted strategic bombardment training and air refueling operations on a global scale based at Griffiss Air Force Base in New York. 416th BW crews and aircraft deployed to the Pacific during the Vietnam War era to support SAC operations during the conflict. In 1984, the wing and group were consolidated and became a single unit. In 1991, wing tanker crews and KC-135R aircraft participated in the war in Southwest Asia. The 416th was inactivated as part of the Post-Cold War drawdown of United States strategic forces in 1995 (BRAC 1993) and the closure of Griffiss AFB.

In 2002 the wing was converted to provisional status as the 416th Air Expeditionary Group It served as the host unit at Karshi-Khanabad Air Base (K2), in Qarshi, Uzbekistan, from 2002 to 2005, where it supported operations against the Taliban and al-Qaeda in Afghanistan. It was redesignated as the 416th Air Expeditionary Wing in 2010, but the current status of this unit is not publicly known.

== History ==
=== World War II ===
Media related to 416th Bombardment Group (United States Army Air Forces) at Wikimedia Commons

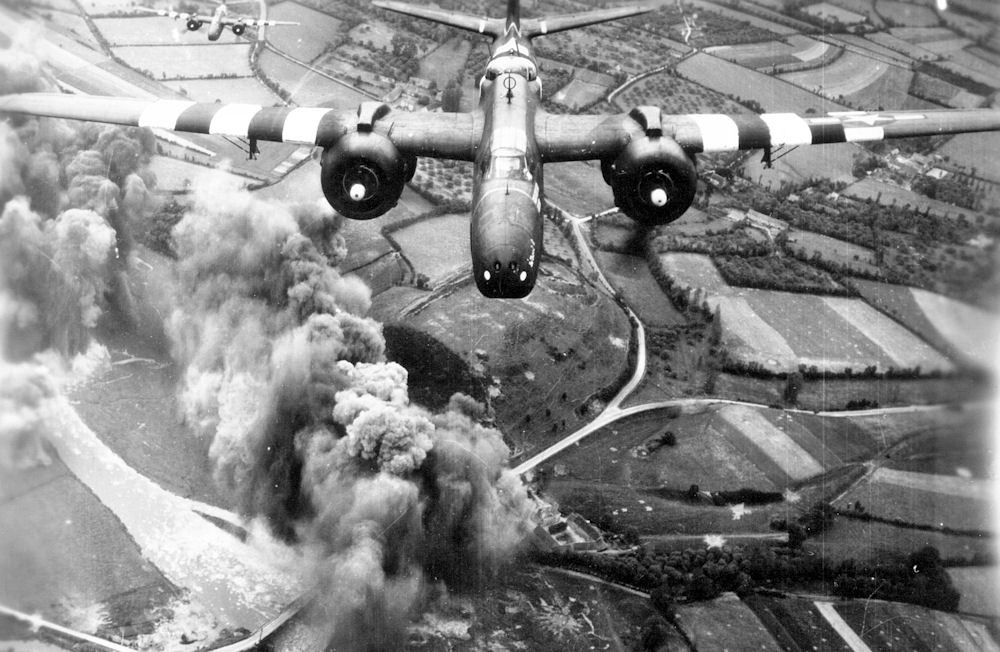
A-20 from the 416th Bomb Group making a bomb run on D-Day, 6 June 1944

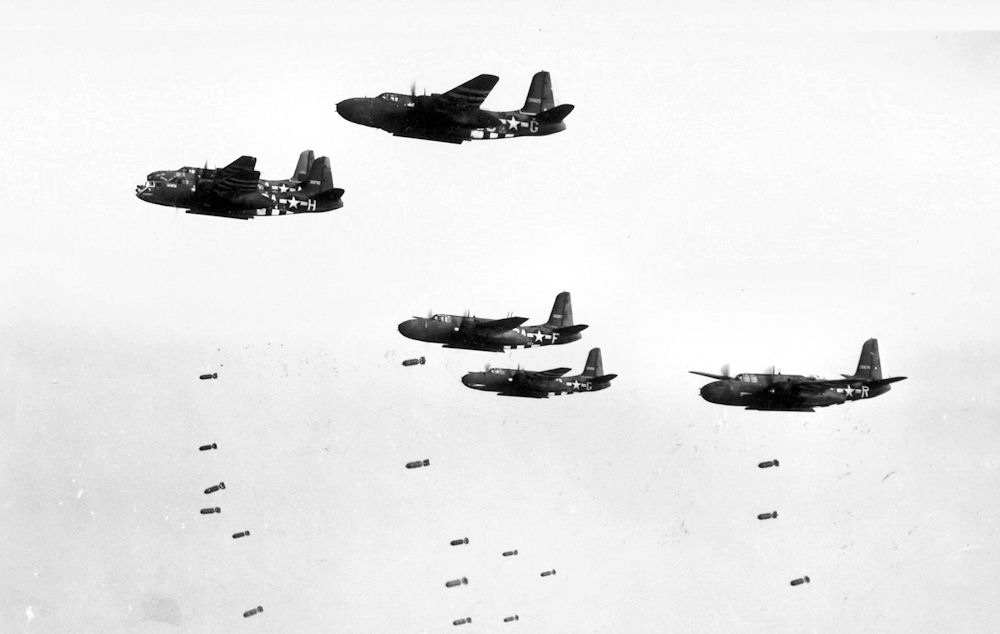
Flight of A-20 from the 416th Bomb Group making a bomb run

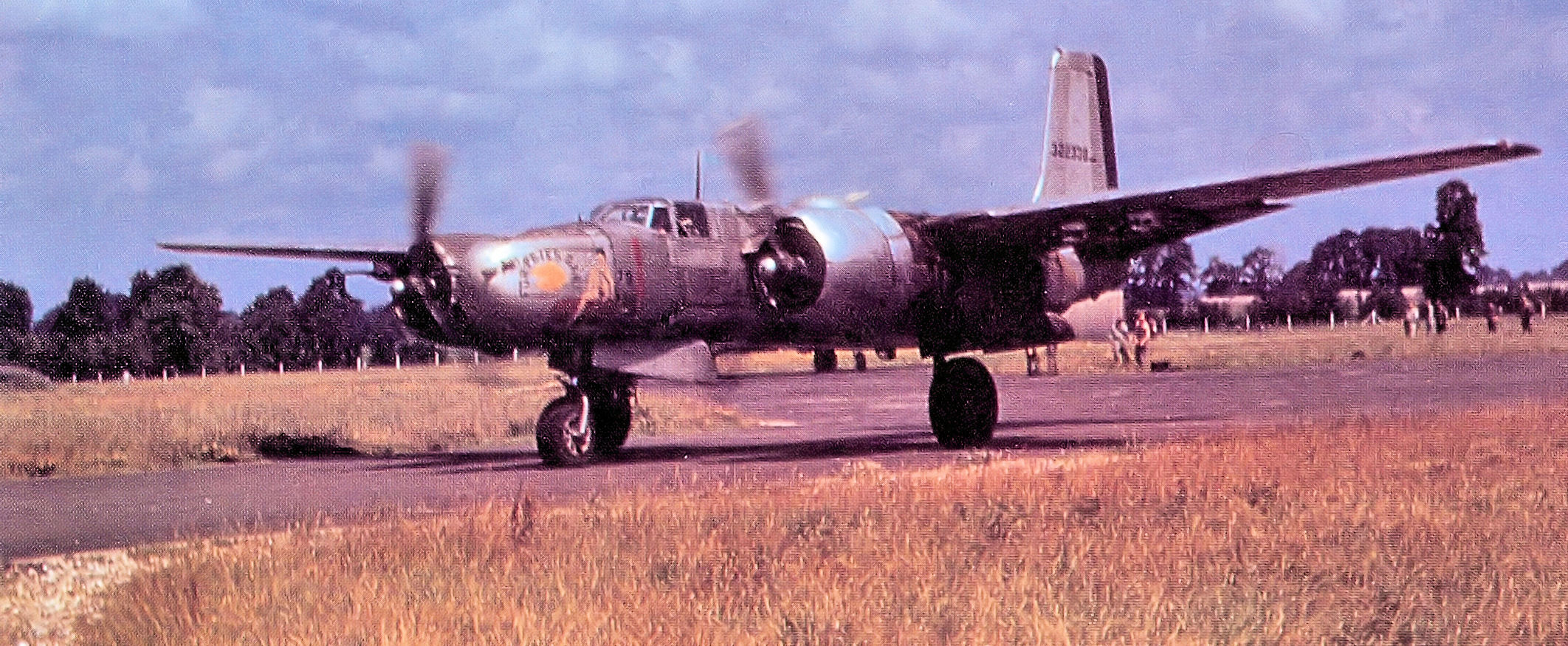
416th Bombardment Group Douglas A-26 Invader, Laon/Athies Airfield (A-69), France, 1945

==== Training in the United States ====
The wing was first activated on 5 February 1943 without personnel, at Will Rogers Field, Oklahoma as the 416th Bombardment Group (Light). (Note: The authority for the organization of this group was contained in General Order #3, Headquarter Army Air Base, Will Rogers Field, Oklahoma, 4 February 1943.) The original squadrons of the group were the 668th, 669th, 670th, and 671st Bombardment Squadrons

Fifty-one officers and two hundred and forty-one (241) enlisted men were transferred to the group on 15 February 1943. The source of the cadre was the 46th Bombardment Group and units from Will Rogers Field; Blythe AAF, California; Barksdale Field, Louisiana and a number of men with considerable overseas experience from the Third Air Force Replacement Center, Plant Park, Florida. On that date, the 46th BG moved to the North side of Will Rogers Field, leaving the South side to the 416th BG.

The group originally operated as an Operational Training Unit under the III Air Support Command, providing a portion of the initial cadre of the 417th Bombardment Group. The group fell back on the 46th BG for assistance with its training. Pilots were attached to the 46th BG for transition flying during the first three months of its existence. On 11 May, the first eight (8) planes were assigned to the 416th Group. One North American B-25C Mitchell and one Douglas A-20B Havoc was given to each of the 668th and 669th Squadrons. Two A-20B's were assigned to each of the 670th and 671st Squadrons. Classes in all the military occupational specialties were conducted by the 46th until 1 June 1943. The Pilots attended Ground School, for five hours a day, in the following subjects: code, link trainer, aircraft recognition, operation and maintenance of the A-20 and B-25, air navigation, radio, instrument procedure, etc. The Intelligence personnel attended classes for one hour a day.

==== Combat in the European Theater ====
The bombardment group moved to England in January to February 1944, and was assigned to Ninth Air Force. It entered combat in March 1944, and during the next several weeks directed most of its attacks against V-1 and V-2 sites in France. In addition to the assigned code markings assigned to each of its squadrons, the 416th's aircraft were marked with a "white diagonal stripe emanating outwards from the [trailing] edge of the ... rudder." The 416th flew a number of missions against airfields and coastal defenses to help prepare for the invasion of Normandy. It supported the invasion in June 1944 by striking road junctions, marshalling yard, bridges, and railway overpasses. The group assisted ground forces at Caen and Saint-Lô in July and at Brest later in the summer, by hitting transportation facilities, supply dumps, radar installations, and other targets. In spite of intense resistance, the group bombed bridges, railways, rolling stock, and a radar station to disrupt the enemy's retreat through the Falaise gap, 6–9 August 1944, and received a Distinguished Unit Citation for the missions.

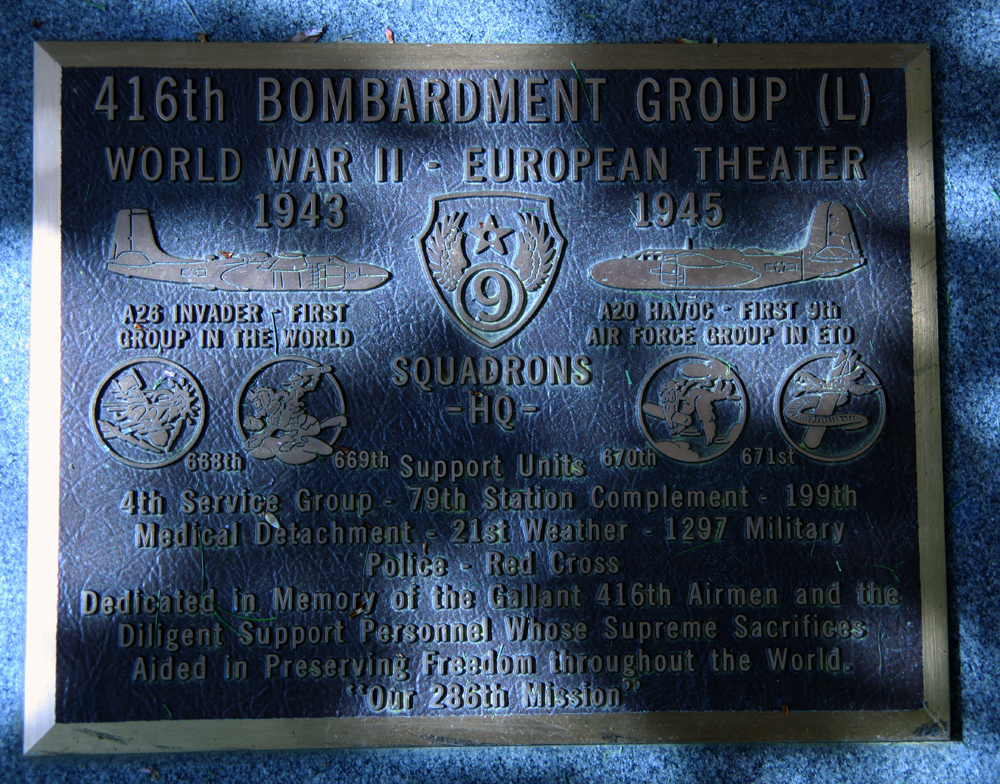
416th Bombardment Group memorial plaque at Arlington National Cemetery

The group assisted the airborne attack on the Netherlands in September. It also supported the assault on the Siegfried Line by pounding transportation, warehouses, supply dumps, and defended villages in Germany. in November, the group converted to Douglas A-26 Invader aircraft. With its new aircraft it attacked transportation facilities, strong points, communications centers, and troop concentrations during the Battle of the Bulge from December 1944 through January 1945. It aided the Allied thrust into Germany by continuing its strikes against transportation, communications, airfields, storage depots, and other objectives, February—May 1945. It also bombed flak positions in support of the airborne assault across the Rhine in March 1945. The group returned to the US between July and October 1945 and was inactivated at the port of embarkation on 24 October 1945.

=== Cold War ===
==== 4039th Strategic Wing ====
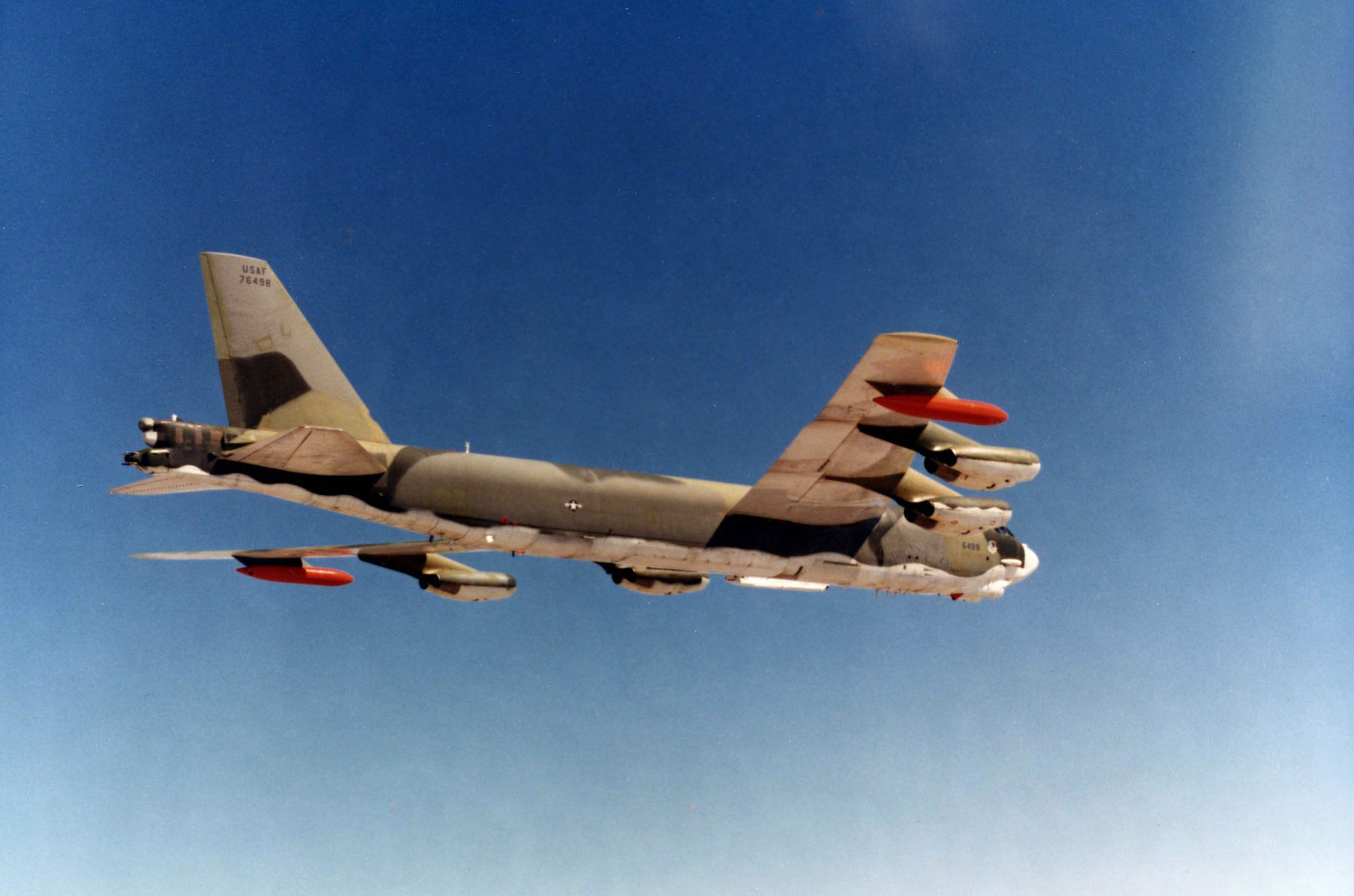
Boeing B-52G Stratofortress

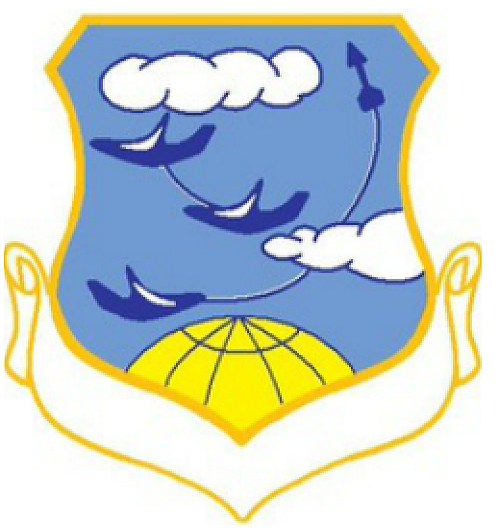
4039th Strategic Wing emblem

The origins of the 416th Bombardment Wing begin on 1 August 1958 when Strategic Air Command established the 4039th Strategic Wing at Griffiss AFB, New York as part of SAC's plan to disperse its B-52 Stratofortress heavy bombers over a larger number of bases, thus making it more difficult for the Soviet Union to knock out the entire fleet with a surprise first strike. The wing remained a headquarters only until 5 January 1959 when the 41st Air Refueling Squadron, flying Boeing KC-135 Stratotankers and three maintenance squadrons were activated and assigned to the wing and the wing was transferred from Eighth Air Force to the 820th Air Division. In July, the 56th Aviation Depot Squadron was activated to oversee the wing's special weapons. It became fully organized on 15 October 1959 when the 75th Bombardment Squadron (BS), consisting of 15 Boeing B-52 Stratofortresses moved to Griffiss from Loring AFB, Maine where it had been one of the three squadrons of the 42d Bombardment Wing. Starting in 1960, one third of the squadron's aircraft were maintained on fifteen-minute alert, fully fueled and ready for combat to reduce vulnerability to a Soviet missile strike. This was increased to half the squadron's aircraft in 1962. The 4039th (and later the 416th) continued to maintain an alert commitment until December 1991. On 1 April 1961 the wing was reassigned from the 820th to the 6th Air Division, which was activated at Dow. In 1962, the wing bombers began to be equipped with the GAM-77 Hound Dog and the GAM-72 Quail air-launched cruise missiles, The 4039th Airborne Missile Maintenance Squadron was activated in November to maintain these missiles. However, SAC Strategic Wings could not carry a permanent history or lineage and SAC looked for a way to make its Strategic Wings permanent.

==== 416th Bombardment Wing ====
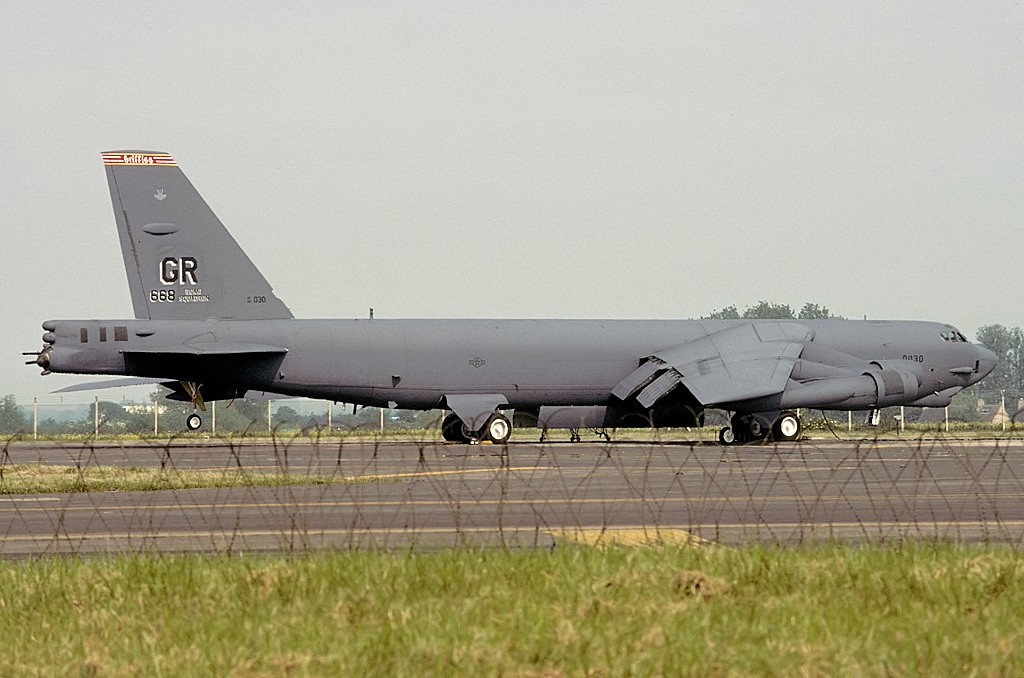
416th Wing B-52H

In 1962, in order to perpetuate the lineage of many currently inactive bombardment units with illustrious World War II records, Headquarters SAC received authority from Headquarters USAF to discontinue its Major Command controlled (MAJCON) strategic wings that were equipped with combat aircraft and to activate Air Force controlled (AFCON) units, most of which were inactive at the time which could carry a lineage and history.

The 4039th SW was replaced by the newly constituted 416th Bombardment Wing (416th BW) on 1 February 1963 and was assigned to SAC's 6th Air Division. (Note: Although the 416th Wing was a new organization, it continued, through temporary bestowal, the history, and honors of the World War II 416th Bombardment Group. It was also entitled to retain the honors (but not the history or lineage) of the 4039th. This temporary bestowal ended in January 1984, when the wing and group were consolidated into a single unit.) The 75th Sqiuadron was also replaced by the 668th Bombardment Squadron, one of the unit's World War II historical bombardment squadrons. The 41st Air Refueling Squadron and 56th Munitions Maintenance Squadron transferred to the 416th. The 4039th's maintenance and security squadrons were replaced by ones with the 416th numerical designation of the newly established wing. Each of the new units assumed the personnel, equipment, and mission of its predecessor. Under the Dual Deputate organization, all components were directly assigned to the wing, no operational or maintenance group element was activated. The history, lineage and honors of the 416th Bombardment Group were temporarily bestowed upon the newly established wing upon activation.

The 416th Bomb Wing continued to conduct strategic bombardment training and air refueling operations to meet operational commitments of Strategic Air Command, including deployments to Southeast Asia during the Vietnam War with tankers and crews from December 1964 through December 1975 and with bomber crews from June 1968 through 1975. The 416th BW assumed host wing responsibility at Griffiss AFB, New York on 1 July 1970, when the base was transferred from Air Force Systems Command to SAC.

In 1988, the wing began to prepare for a primarily conventional warfare role. In June 1990, the wing added a second air refueling squadron when the 509th Air Refueling Squadron moved to Griffiss from Pease AFB, New Hampshire and became part of the wing. Shortly afterward, in August, it began to deploy KC-135s to Seeb International Airport and B-52s to Spain, Diego Garcia, and England. From January to April 1991 the wing flew combat missions in Southwest Asia.

In September 1991, the wing ended its support of worldwide air refueling operations. The wing was assigned to Air Combat Command (ACC) after inactivation of SAC on 1 June 1992 and its refueling squadrons, while physically remaining at Griffiss, were assigned to the 380th Operations Group, Plattsburgh AFB of Air Mobility Command. Wing aircraft carried ACC Tail Code "GR". The wing was inactivated in 1995 due to closure of Griffiss AFB. The 416th transferred the last two of its B-52Hs to the 5th Bomb Wing at Minot AFB, North Dakota on 15 November 1994 in preparation for inactivation in 1995 with the closure of Griffiss AFB.

=== Post Cold War era ===
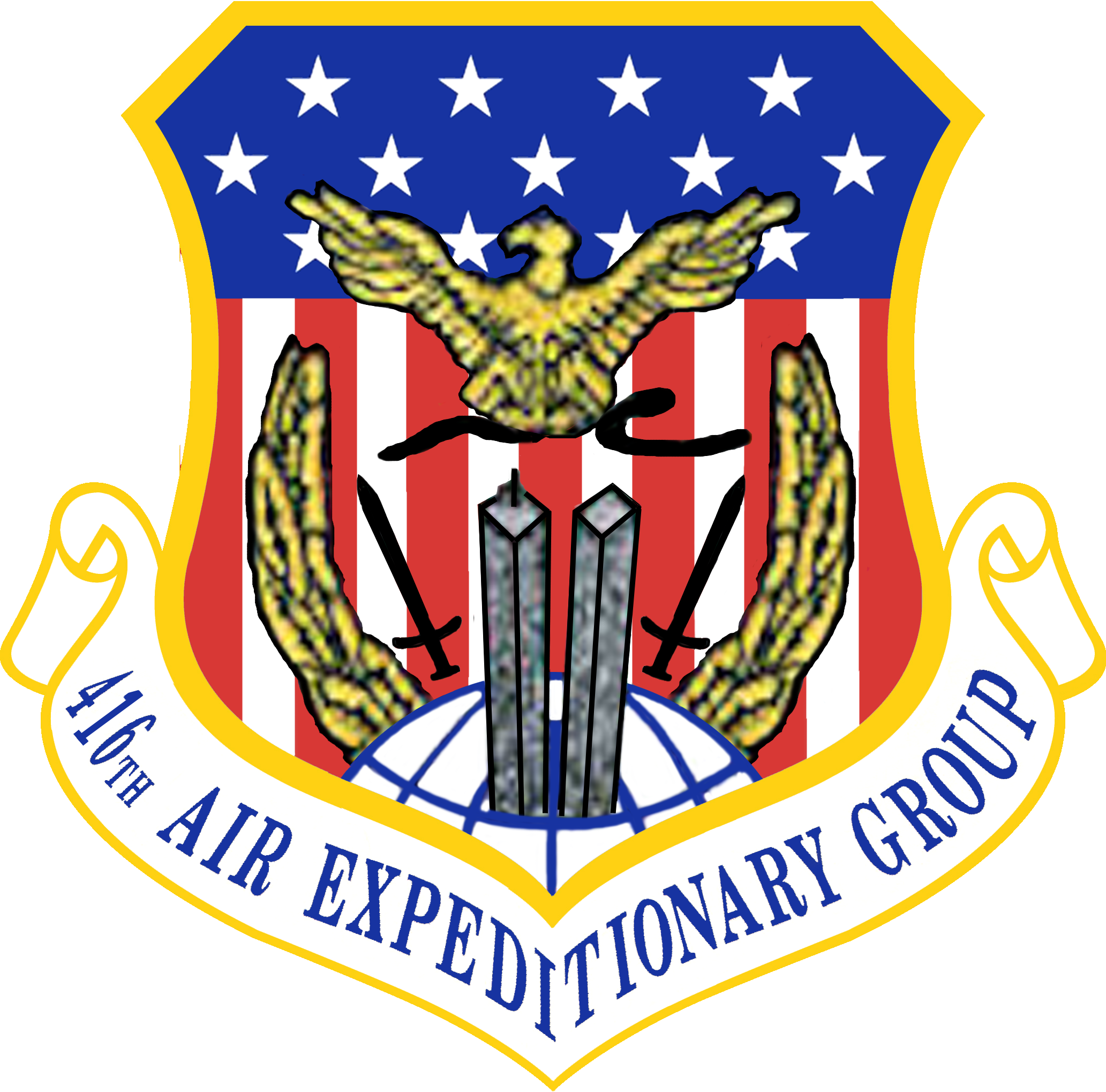
Unofficial Emblem used by 416th Air Expeditionary Group

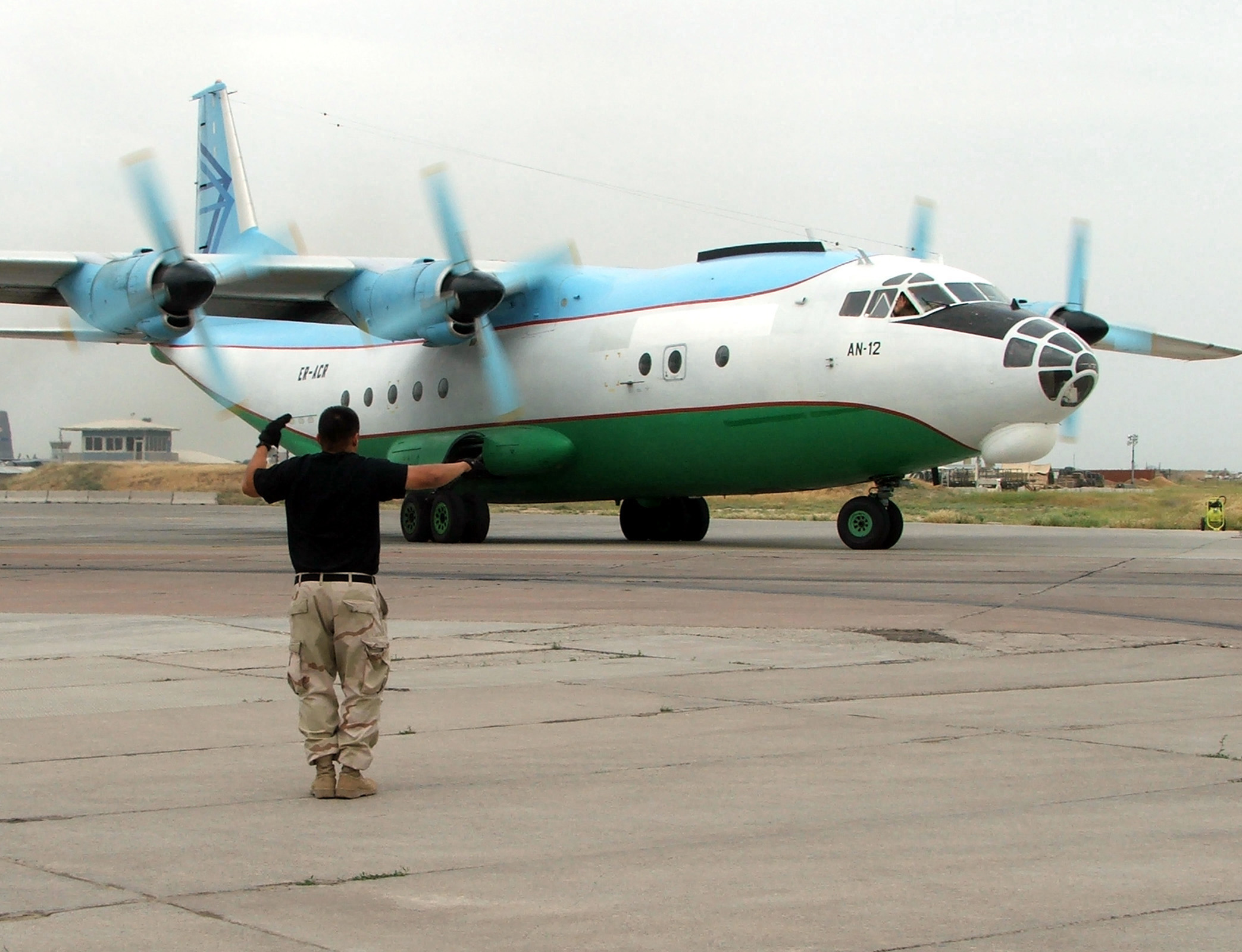
A 416th Air Expeditionary Group airman gives directions to the crew of a Russian-built AN-12 cargo plane at Karshi-Khanabad AB

The wing became a provisional air expeditionary group as part of the global war on terrorism in 2002. It was assigned to Uzbekistan as an Air Combat Command unit in early 2002. There it operated the base, which was used for transshipments of cargo and supplies from United States, for onward tactical airlift to combat forces in Afghanistan fighting Taliban and Al-Qaeda forces. The group was inactivated in November 2005 after the Uzbek government requested the United States withdraw its forces from their territory. In 2010, the group was upgraded to wing but is not known to have been active under that designation.

== Lineage ==
416th Bombardment Group

- Constituted as 416th Bombardment Group (Light) on 25 January 1943

Activated on 5 February 1943
Redesignated 416th Bombardment Group, Light on 20 August 1943
Inactivated on 24 October 1945

- Consolidated with the 416th Bombardment Wing, Heavy on 31 January 1984 as the 416th Bombardment Wing, Heavy

416th Bombardment Wing

- Constituted as 416th Bombardment Wing, Heavy, on 15 November 1962

Activated on 15 November 1962
Organized on 1 February 1963
Consolidated with the 416th Bombardment Group, Light on 31 January 1984
Redesignated 416th Wing on 1 September 1991
Redesignated 416th Bomb Wing on 1 June 1992
Inactivated on 30 September 1995

- Redesignated 416th Air Expeditionary Group, and converted to provisional status, on 3 May 2002

Redesignated 416th Air Expeditionary Wing on 23 February 2010

=== Assignments ===
- III Air Support Command, 5 February 1943
- III Bomber Command (attached to II Tactical Air Division 1 November 1943 – 22 November 1943), 6 August 1943
- IX Bomber Command ca. 1 February 1944
- 97th Combat Bombardment Wing (later 97th Bombardment Wing) (under operational control of 99th Combat Bombardment Wing until 20 March 1944, IX Bomber Command, 11–18 September 1944, 99th Combat Bombardment Wing – 28 September 1944), 4 February 1944
- Assembly Area Command, c. 27 July 1945 – 24 October 1945
- Strategic Air Command, 15 November 1962
- 6th Air Division, 1 February 1963
- 57th Air Division, 2 July 1966
- 817th Air Division, 2 September 1966
- 45th Air Division, 2 July 1969
- 40th Air Division, 30 June 1971
- 45th Air Division, 1 July 1973
- 40th Air Division, 1 December 1982
- Eighth Air Force, 8 June 1988 – 30 September 1995
- Air Combat Command to activate or inactivate any time after September 2001

Attached to: United States Central Command Air Forces, 2002–2005

=== Components ===
Groups

- 416th Combat Support Group (later 416th Support Group), 1 July 1970 – 30 September 1995
- 416th Logistics Group, 1 September 1991 – 30 September 1995
- 416th Operations Group, 1 September 1991 – 30 September 1995

Operational Squadrons

- 41st Air Refueling Squadron: 1 February 1963 – 1 September 1991
- 509th Air Refueling Squadron: 30 June 1990 – 1 September 1991
- 668th Bombardment Squadron: 5 February 1943 – 24 October 1945; 1 February 1963 – 1 September 1991
- 669th Bombardment Squadron: 5 February 1943 – 24 October 1945
- 670th Bombardment Squadron: 5 February 1943 – 24 October 1945
- 671st Bombardment Squadron: 5 February 1943 – 24 October 1945

Support Squadrons

- 56th Munitions Maintenance Squadron, 1 February 1963 – 1 October 1972
- 416th Airborne Missile Maintenance Squadron, 1 February 1963 – 30 September 1974
- 416th Armament & Electronics Maintenance Squadron (later 416th Avionics Maintenance Squadron, 416th Intermediate Level Maintenance Squadron), 1 February 1963 – 1 September 1991
- 416th Combat Defense Squadron (later 416th Security Police Squadron), 1 February 1963 – 1 July 1970
- 416th Field Maintenance Squadron, 1 February 1963 – 1 September 1991
- 416th Munitions Maintenance Squadron, 1 October 1972 – 1 September 1991
- 416th Organizational Maintenance Squadron, 1 February 1963 – 1 September 1991

Detachments

- Detachment 1

Otis Air Force Base Massachusetts 2 Alert KC-135A's (Shared with Detachment), 99th Bombardment Wing from Westover AFB, Massachusetts also with 2 Alert KC-135A's, 2 April 1969 – 31 December 1971

- Detachment

Minot AFB, North Dakota 2 Alert B-52G's & 2 KC-135A's (Shared with a Detachment 380th Bombardment Wing from Plattsburgh AFB, New York with 2 Alert KC-135A's Relocated after April 1972 but prior to October 1973 Attached to the 5th Bombardment Wing

=== Stations ===
- Will Rogers Field, Oklahoma, 5 February 1943
- Lake Charles Army Air Field, Louisiana, 4 June 1943
- Laurel Army Air Field, Mississippi, November 1943 – 1 January 1944
- RAF Wethersfield (AAF-170), England, 1 February 1944
- Melun/Villaroche Airfield (A-55), France, 23 September 1944
- Laon/Athies Airfield (A-69), France, ca. 12 February 1945
- Cormeilles en Vexin Airfield (A-59), France, 24 May 1945
- Cambrai, France, c. 15 July 1945
- Camp Chicago (near Laon), France, 27 July 1945 – September 1945
- Camp Myles Standish, Massachusetts, 23 October 1945 – 24 October 1945
- Griffiss AFB, New York, 15 November 1962 – 30 September 1995
- Karshi-Khanabad Air Base (K2), Uzbekistan, 2002 – November 2005.

=== Aircraft ===
- Douglas A-20 Havoc, 1943, 1944–1945
- Douglas A-26 Invader, 1944–1945
- Boeing B-52 Stratofortress (B-52G, 1963–1991; B-52H, 1991–1995)
- Boeing KC-135 Stratotanker (KC-135A, 1963–1990; KC-135R, 1990–1993)
- Cessna T-37 Tweet, 1993–1995

== Awards and campaigns ==
Award streamer	Award	Dates	Notes
	Distinguished Unit Citation	6 August 1944 – 9 August 1944	France, 416th Bombardment Group
	Air Force Outstanding Unit Award w/Combat "V" Device	1 July 2004 – 31 May 2005	416th Air Expeditionary Group
	Air Force Outstanding Unit Award w/Combat "V" Device	1 June 2005 – 31 May 2006	416th Air Expeditionary Group
	Air Force Outstanding Unit Award	15 September 1981 – 31 October 1982	416th Bombardment Wing
	Air Force Outstanding Unit Award	1 July 1984 – 30 June 1986	416th Bombardment Wing
	Air Force Outstanding Unit Award	1 July 1989 – 30 June 1991	416th Bombardment Wing

Campaign Streamer	Campaign	Dates	Notes
	Air Offensive, Europe	1 February 1944 – 5 June 1944	416th Bombardment Group
	Normandy	6 June 1944 – 24 July 1944	416th Bombardment Group
	Northern France	25 July 1944 – 14 September 1944	416th Bombardment Group
	Rhineland	5 September 1944 – 21 March 1945	416th Bombardment Group
	Ardennes-Alsace	6 December 1944 – 25 January 1945	416th Bombardment Group
	Central Europe	22 March 1944 – 21 May 1945	416th Bombardment Group
	Defense of Saudi Arabia		416th Air Expeditionary Group
	Liberation of Kuwait		416th Air Expeditionary Group

== See also ==
- List of B-52 Units of the United States Air Force
