= 418th Bombardment Group =

418th Bombardment Group (later 418th Tactical Missile Wing)
- Active: 1943–1943; 1944–1944
- Country: United States
- Branch: United States Air Force
- Role: Bomber training

The 418th Bombardment Group is the designation held by two United States Army Air Forces advanced training units, briefly active during World War II. The two groups were consolidated in 1958 and redesignated the 418th Tactical Missile Wing in 1985, but the consolidated unit has never been active.

== History ==
The first 418th Bombardment Group was activated in August 1943 at Lake Charles Army Air Field, Louisiana. It was apparently only minimally manned and never received aircraft before it was disbanded in September.

The second 418th Bombardment Group was activated in March 1944 at Alamogordo Army Airfield, New Mexico as a Replacement Training Unit for Boeing B-29 Superfortress aircrews. However, even as the unit was being activated, the Army Air Forces (AAF) had determined that standard military units like the group, based on relatively inflexible tables of organization not well adapted to the training mission. The AAF had already determined to change to a more functional system in which each base was organized into a separate numbered unit. The 418th was disbanded and bomber training activities at Alamogordo were assigned to the new 231st AAF Base Unit (Combat Crew Training Station, Bombardment, Heavy)

The United States Air Force consolidated the two groups in April 1958. In 1985, the consolidated unit was redesignated the 418th Tactical Missile Wing, but has not been active since.

== Lineage ==
418th Bombardment Group (Light)

- Constituted as the 418th Bombardment Group (Light) on 16 July 1943

Activated on 1 August 1943
Disbanded on 15 September 1943
Reconstituted and consolidated with the 418th Bombardment Group, Very Heavy as the 418th Bombardment Group, Very Heavy in April 1958

418th Bombardment Group, Very Heavy

- Constituted as the 418th Bombardment Group, Very Heavy on 28 February 1944

Activated on 11 March 1944
Disbanded on 1 April 1944
Reconstituted and consolidated with the 418th Bombardment Group (Light) in April 1958
Redesignated 418th Tactical Missile Wing on 31 July 1985

=== Assignments ===
- II Tactical Air Division, 1 August–15 September 1943
- 16th Bombardment Operational Training Wing, 28 February–1 April 1944

=== Components ===
- 696th Bombardment Squadron: 1 August–15 September 1943
- 697th Bombardment Squadron: 1 August–15 September 1943
- 698th Bombardment Squadron: 1 August–15 September 1943
- 699th Bombardment Squadron: 1 August–15 September 1943

=== Stations ===
- Lake Charles Army Air Field, Louisiana, 1 August–15 September 1943
- Alamogordo Army Air Field, New Mexico, 28 February–1 April 1944
