= Melun Villaroche Aerodrome =

Paris Villaroche (Melun) Aerodrome Aérodrome de Paris Villaroche (Melun) Advanced Landing Ground (ALG) A-55
- IATA: QFM; ICAO: LFPM

Summary
- Airport type: Public
- Operator: SYMPAV (Syndicat Mixte du pôle d'activités de Villaroche)
- Serves: Melun, France
- Elevation AMSL: 304 ft (93 m)
- Coordinates: 48°36′19″N 002°40′15″E

Map
- Location of Paris Villaroche (Melun) Aerodrome

Runways
Direction	Length		Surface
Direction	m	ft	Surface
10/28	1,975	6,480	Asphalt
01/19	1,300	4,265	Asphalt
- Sources: French AIP, UAF, DAFIF

Paris Villaroche (Melun) Aerodrome (French: Aérodrome de Paris Villaroche (Melun)) (ICAO: LFPM) is an aerodrome located 8.5 km (4.6 NM) north of Melun, a commune in the Seine-et-Marne department in the Île-de-France region in north-central France.

The airport is located 5 km (3.1 mi) east-southeast of Moissy-Cramayel and 34 km (21 mi) southeast of Paris.

== Facilities ==
The airport resides at an elevation of 93 m (305 ft) above mean sea level. It has two paved runways: 10/28 measuring 1,975 by 45 metres (6,480 ft × 148 ft) and 01/19 measuring 1,300 by 30 metres (4,265 ft × 98 ft).

It supports business aviation and general aviation with no scheduled commercial airline service. The airport is equipped for VFR (visual) or IFR (instrument). Its control tower, equipped with radar, also provides air traffic control at low altitude in a large area of north-east to south-west of the Paris region. Both runways are still in use, the north–south 01/19 being reduced in length, and the east–west 10/28 extended for use by jet aircraft. Modern navigational aids are available and the facility is well maintained with a large airpark and a significant number of hangars.

The Bureau d'Enquêtes et d'Analyses pour la Sécurité de l'Aviation Civile, the French air accident investigation agency, has facilities at Melun Aerodrome. They include hangars and protected areas with a combined total of 6,000 square metres (65,000 sq ft) of space. A campus of the École nationale de l'aviation civile (French civil aviation university) is also located in the aerodrome.

== History ==
Villaroche Airport was a civil airport built prior to World War II.

=== German use during World War II ===
Seized by the Germans in June 1940 during the Battle of France, Villaroche was used as a Luftwaffe military airfield during the occupation. Known units assigned (all from Luftlotte 3, Fliegerkorps IV):

- Kampfgeschwader 51 (KG 51) 1 August 1940 – 30 March 1941 Junkers Ju 88A (Fuselage Code: 9K+)
- Kampfgeschwader 30 (KG 30) 2 June – 4 October 1941 Junkers Ju 88A (Fuselage Code: 4D+)
- Kampfgeschwader 55 (KG 55) 1 October – 30 December 1941 Heinkel He 111H (Fuselage Code: G1+)
- Kampfgeschwader 2 (KG 2) 15–22 April 1942 Do 217E, Ju 188 (Fuselage Code: U5+)
- Kampfgeschwader 6 (KG 6) 4 June – 10 July 1944 Junkers Ju 88A/E, Junkers Ju 188A (Fuselage Code: 3E+)

The airfield was attacked on 1 August 1944 by B-17 Flying Fortresses of the Eighth Air Force 398th Bombardment Group (Mission 59)

=== American use ===
The airfield was liberated by Allied ground forces about 1 September 1944 during the Northern France Campaign. Almost immediately, the United States Army Air Forces IX Engineer Command 830th and 833rd Engineer Aviation battalions along with the 878th Airborne Engineer Aviation Battalion cleared the airport of mines and destroyed Luftwaffe aircraft. A significant amount of battle damage was sustained, requiring repairs that included the laying of a new 5000' asphalt secondary runway. On 15 September, after about two weeks of reconstruction, Villaroche Airport became a USAAF Ninth Air Force combat airfield, designated as "A-55".

Under American control, the Ninth Air Force assigned the 416th Bombardment Group to the airport which flew A-26 Invader and A-20 Havoc attack bombers from the airfield until February 1945. The combat unit then moved east along with the Allied lines and the airport became transport airfield and air service depot, hosting C-47 Skytrains of the 436th Troop Carrier Group and the Air Technical Service Command 462d Air Service Group until the summer of 1945, after end of the war.

After the war, much reconstruction was necessary and the entire airport was rebuilt. In the late 1940s, as the civil use of Orly Airport in Paris began to expand after its reconstruction from wartime damage, Melun Villaroche was used by the United States Air Force as a pilot proficiency airfield.

In 1950-1951 when as a result of the Cold War threat of the Soviet Union, Melun Villaroche Airport was proposed by the United States Air Force to become a NATO transport facility. Plans were made to establish a long-term lease of the facility as a United States military airfield. Plans were designed for a large Military Air Transport Service (MATS) air terminal to support personnel and cargo flights into the Paris area. In addition, a major USAF Hospital for the Paris area was also planned and designed.

In the ongoing negotiations, the site was ultimately rejected. The plans for expanding USAF use of the facility were cancelled in favor of the expansion of the MATS facilities at Orly Air Base, and the hospital was constructed at the new USAF Évreux-Fauville Air Base instead. The Americans continued to use Melun Villaroche on a limited basis for pilot proficiency flying until Évreux-Fauville AB opened in 1955 and at that point the airport was returned to full French control.

Allied Air Forces Central Europe Communication Squadron RAF was formed here.

== Current use ==
Today the main users of the airfield are Elyxan Aviation, the Fixed-Base Operator; Aerosotravia; the aero-club-Melun Villaroche "Constantine Rozanoff", and collectors of vintage aircraft.

Private, Corporate-Business Jet & Turboprop aircraft operators, in conjunction with area businesses and visitors to Paris use the airport daily.

Safran Aircraft Engines has a large manufacturing plant to the south of the airport along D-57. Safran built the plant over part of the abandoned World War II airfield, where abandoned taxiways can still be seen in open areas. This aerodrome is best known for the numerous tests of aircraft prototypes that have occurred until the early 1980s, especially those of several military aircraft such as the Dassault Mystère and Mirage, and VTOL designs. It was also a test center for Safran.

Many World War II relics can be found at the airport, abandoned taxiways with aircraft hardstands are evident with deteriorating concrete. A munitions storage area remains to the east of the north–south runways in a wooded area along with what appear to be old concrete hangar foundations, buildings, and other wartime concrete taxiways.

== See also ==
- Advanced Landing Ground
- Orly Air Base
