= Laon-Athies Air Base =

Military airfield near Laon, France

Laon-Athies Air Base Villeneuve-Vertus Airfield Advanced Landing Ground (ALG) A-69
- Picardy Region, France

Site information
- Type: Military airfield
- Controlled by: United States Army Air Forces; United States Air Force

Location
- Coordinates: 49°35′47″N 003°42′31″E

Site history
- In use: September 1944-May 1945. 1950s-1960s
- Materials: Concrete

Laon-Athies Air Base is an abandoned military airfield, which is located near the city of Laon in the Aisne department of France.

Its history begins before World War II, when it was originally a grass civil airdrome. During the German occupation of France (1940–1944), the Luftwaffe developed the airdrome into a major military airfield, basing a variety of planes at the airfield, as well as using it as a maintenance and supply depot. Attacked frequently by Allied Air Forces, the Luftwaffe base was seized by Allied Ground Forces in September 1944 and was used as a Fighter and bomber base by the United States Army Air Forces until the end of the war.

Closed after the war, the airfield was rebuilt in the 1950s as a NATO Dispersed Operating Base for United States Air Force units in France to disperse their forces to in case of a war with the Warsaw Pact. The base was home to the 66th Tactical Reconnaissance Wing during the 60's and was abandoned by 1967.

== History ==
Athies appears to have been an airport prior to World War II, most likely with some hangars, a terminal, control tower and grass runways.

=== German use during World War II ===
Seized by the Germans in June 1940 during the Battle of France, Athies was used as a Luftwaffe military airfield during the occupation. The Germans improved the facility by expanding the support area with numerous maintenance shops, hangars, and laying down two 1600m concrete all-weather runways, aligned 17/35 and 08/26. Numerous taxiways and dispersal aircraft parking areas were also constructed.

Known units assigned (all from Luftlotte 3, Fliegerkorps IV):

- Kampfgeschwader 4 (KG 4) July 1941-January 1942 Heinkel He 111H (Fuselage code: F8+)
- Kampfgeschwader 2 (KG 2) 30 September 1941 – 25 November 1942 Junkers Ju 88A (Fuselage code: 1G+)
- Kampfgeschwader 76 (KG 76) 15 July-25 November 1943 Junkers Ju 88A (Fuselage code: F1+)
- 2/Nachtjagdgeschwader 2 (2/NJG 2) August–September 1943 Dornier Do 217 (Fuselage code: 4R+)
- 3/Nachtjagdgeschwader 4 (3/NJG 4) August–September 1943 Junkers Ju 88A (Fuselage code: G9+)
- Kampfgeschwader 54 (KG 54) 23 December 1943 – 6 April 1944 Junkers Ju 88A (Fuselage code: 2F+)
- Schlachtgeschwader 4 (SG 4) December 1943-February 1944 Focke-Wulf Fw 190F/G
- Nachtjagdgeschwader 1 (NJG 1) March–May 1944 Messerschmitt Bf 110
- Nachtjagdgeschwader 5 (NJG 5) May–August 1944 Messerschmitt Bf 110

In addition, from wartime USAAF records, the Luftwaffe established a maintenance repair and supply depot at Athies. The airfield was initially used as a bomber base for night bomber operations by He 111s and Ju 88s, attacking targets in England until late 1943. With Luftwaffe bomber activities ending, Athies became a night interceptor base against Royal Air Force bombers flying over Occupied France on their way to targets in Germany. It appears that SG 4, a Fw 190F/G unit, was brought to Athies from the Eastern Front, where it was a dive-bomber unit. The airfield was attacked on several occasions by Eighth Air Force heavy bombers in 1943 and 1944.

=== American use ===
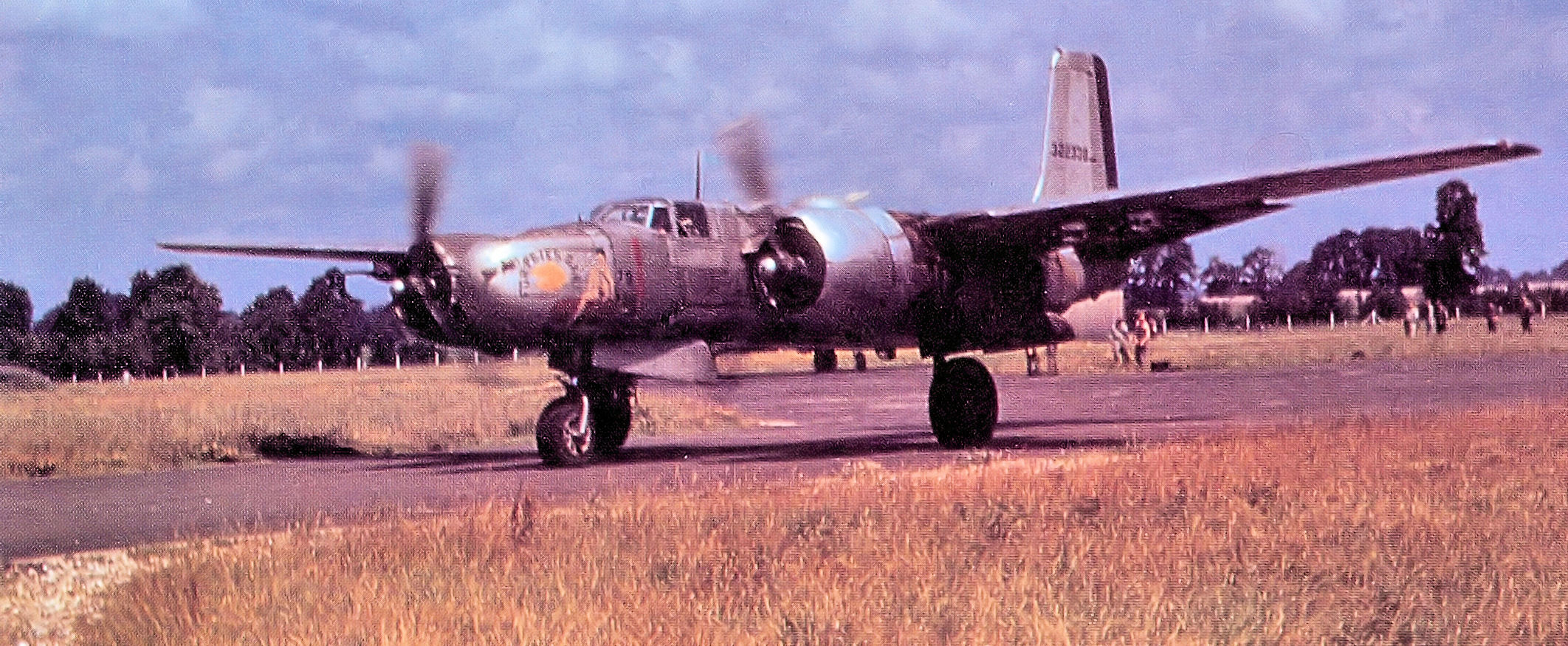
A-26 Invader of the 416th Bombardment Group at A-69 Laon/Athies Airfield, 1945

During the Liberation of France, the Luftwaffe abandoned the base airfield at the end of August, sending in demolition teams to blow up hangars, buildings, electrical generators, water treatment and other facilities. It was seized by Allied ground forces in early September, and turned over to the United States Army Air Forces. The IX Engineer Command 820th Engineer Aviation Battalion moved in about 7 September and began a quick rehabilitation of the base so it could be used by American aircraft.

It was declared operationally ready for combat units on 9 September, a few days after its capture from German forces, being designated as Advanced Landing Ground "A-69 Laon/Athies Airfield". Although operationally usable, Athies was a wrecked base from the Allied air attacks and what was blown up by the Germans as they withdrew. The Americans made do with what could be repaired, and moved in what equipment was necessary to conduct combat operations. Many buildings of masonry construction had been made useless, their contents consisting of nothing but wreckage.

Under American control, Ninth Air Force used the base for several units from 7 September 1944 until closing the base in July 1945. Known units assigned were:

- 50th Fighter Group, 15–26 September 1944, Republic P-47 Thunderbolts
- 368th Fighter Group, 11 September-2 October 1944, P-47 Thunderbolts
- 323d Bombardment Group, 13 October 1944-February 1945, Martin B-26 Marauders
- 416th Bombardment Group, February–May 1945, Douglas A-26 Invaders

With each combat group having three fully equipped squadrons, the airfield at Laon-Athies became one of the busiest American bases on the continent. With the war ended, Laon/Athies airfield was closed on 23 May 1945 and turned over to the French Air Ministry.

=== Postwar use ===
In French control after the war, the base sat abandoned for several years. There was much unexploded ordnance at the site which needed to be removed, as well as the wreckage of German and American aircraft. Many of the buildings at the base were destroyed by the war, and although some had been repaired by the American combat engineers, most were in ruins. Also, the French Air Force wanted nothing to do with a Nazi airfield on French soil. As a result, the Air Ministry leased the land, concrete runways, structures and all, out to farmers for agricultural use, sending in unexploded ordnance teams to remove the dangerous munitions.

=== NATO use ===
In 1950 when as a result of the Cold War threat of the Soviet Union, the air base at Laon-Athies was offered to the United States Air Force by the French Air Ministry as part of their NATO commitment to establish a modern Air Force Base at the site. The high cost of breaking the agricultural leases, and also the high costs of removing the concrete German runways and other facilities led to its rejection as a site for a full air base. However NATO faced several problems when attempting to solve the air power survival equation. Planning for a Warsaw Pact first strike survival in both conventional and nuclear wars had to be considered. The main air bases were built on small parcels of land with very limited dispersal space. It was decided to use Laon-Athies as an emergency "backup" airfield, consisting of a "bare bones" facility of a runway with minimal facilities intended for use by all NATO air forces to disperse their aircraft in case of war.

Beginning about 1954, French demolition companies returned to Laon-Athies and began demolishing the German structures and removing the wreckage of the World War II air base. French Army Explosive demolition teams were brought in to safely remove unexploded ordnance remaining from the war and the site was prepared for construction. A modern all-weather concrete NATO jet runway was laid down aligned 02/20, with taxiways and dispersal areas for three fighter squadrons. The dispersals were designed in a circular marguerite system of hardstands which could be revetted later with earth for added aircraft protection. Typically the margueriete consisted of fifteen to eighteen hardstands, with each hardstand capable of parking one or two aircraft, allowing the planes to be spaced approximately 150 feet (50 m) apart. Each squadron was assigned to a separate hangar/hardstand complex.

Other than the occasional touch-and-go landing of NATO (USAF) aircraft, Laon-Athies Air Base was never used. With the French withdrawal from the integrated military component of NATO in 1967, the base was abandoned.

== Current ==
Laon-Athies Air Base is to the east of the A26 autoroute, near the city of Laon, northeast of the D977 interchange. Today, the former airport and military air base is used for agriculture. The NATO runway, dispersals and taxiways remain in place, and although deteriorated after 40 years of abandonment, they are most likely usable for emergency aircraft landings. All three marguerites and their dispersal pads remain, some removed, but most in reasonable condition.

The removal of the wartime base in the early 1950s was very complete. The only remaining features of Athies wartime past are the two German-built concrete runways, still largely intact. Also taxiways built by the Germans remain as single-track agricultural roads. It is suspected that many former wartime buildings and structures are in the wooded area to the southeast of the airfield, including the bomb dump, however that cannot be discerned from aerial photography due to the extensive tree canopy. Several wartime runways can be seen in the wooded area, probably leading to dispersals, revetments and other abandoned concrete structures.

Heavy equipment flattening whole remaining of former airfield and dispersal marguerites to allow installation of solar panels.

Whole former airbase ground surface and runways to be used as solar farm in the future.

== See also ==
- Advanced Landing Ground
