= Griffiss International Airport =

Public airport in Rome, New York

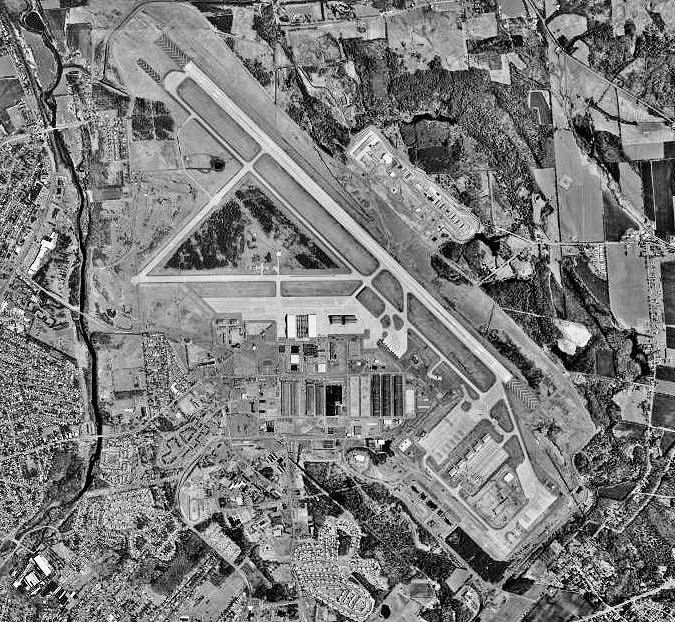
- USGS 1997 orthophoto
- IATA: RME; ICAO: KRME; FAA LID: RME

Summary
- Airport type: Public
- Owner: Oneida County
- Serves: Oneida County
- Location: Rome, New York, U.S.
- Elevation AMSL: 504 ft (154 m)
- Coordinates: 43°14′02″N 075°24′25″W
- Website: ocgov.net/airport

Maps
- FAA airport diagram
- Interactive map of Griffiss International Airport

Runways
Direction	Length		Surface
Direction	ft	m	Surface
15/33	11,820	3,603	Concrete

Statistics (2023)
- Aircraft operations (year ending 7/31/2023): 32,880
- Source: Federal Aviation Administration

Griffiss International Airport (IATA: RME, ICAO: KRME, FAA LID: RME) is a public airport in the northeastern United States, located one mile (1.6 km) east of the central business district of Rome, a city in Oneida County, New York. Publicly owned by the county, the airport is located on the former site of Griffiss Air Force Base, which closed in 1995. Four years later, the airfield hosted the Woodstock '99 music festival.

Operations from the Oneida County Airport in Oriskany, about five miles (8 km) south, were transferred here in 2006, after which the county closed that airport in January 2007. Griffiss is a maintenance and storage facility for several regional airlines, including Republic Airways and Envoy Air.

== Facilities ==
Griffiss International Airport covers an area of 1,680 acres (2.6 sq mi; 6.8 km^{2}) and contains one runway:

- Runway 15/33: 11,820 by 200 feet (3,603 m × 61 m), Surface: Concrete

For the 12-month period ending July 31, 2023, the airport had 32,880 aircraft operations; an average of 90 per day: 85% general aviation, 12% military, 3% air taxi, and <1% commercial.

== History ==
On 3 April 1941, the War Department began looking for an area to construct an air depot in central New York. Orders to begin construction came from the War Department on 23 June 1941 and ground was broken on 2 August 1941. Facilities were completed in February, 1942, and flight operations on the depot airfield began on 18 February 1942. Construction had been supervised by Kenneth Nichols of the United States Army Corps of Engineers Syracuse Engineer District, which was headed by James C. Marshall. Marshall and then Nichols became District Engineer for the Manhattan Engineer District (MED) which built the atomic bomb.

After a series of names and realignments, the base was finally named "Griffiss Air Force Base" in 1948 to honor Lieutenant Colonel Townsend Griffiss (1900–1942): a Buffalo native and 1922 West Point graduate. In 1942, Griffiss became the first U.S. airman to be killed in the line of duty in the European Theatre of World War II when the B-24 Liberator bomber he was aboard was shot down by friendly fire over the English Channel. The USAF had originally applied "Griffiss Air Force Base" to Fort Worth Army Airfield in Texas on 1 January 1948, but its name was changed on 27 February.

=== Rome Air Depot ===
On 1 February 1942, the Rome Air Depot was activated and throughout World War II the depot provided aircraft engine maintenance and repair, and trained air depot groups in engine repair. With the end of the war and the sharp reduction of AAF aircraft operations, activities were sharply curtailed in the fall of 1945. The Rome Air Depot continued operations well into the 1960s as an Air Force Logistics Command Air Materiel Area (AMA), supporting USAF electronics and radar systems. The depot began a phasedown in the early 1960s, with the depot closing in 1967 and its functions being transferred to other AFLC Air Materiel Areas.

=== Air Defense ===

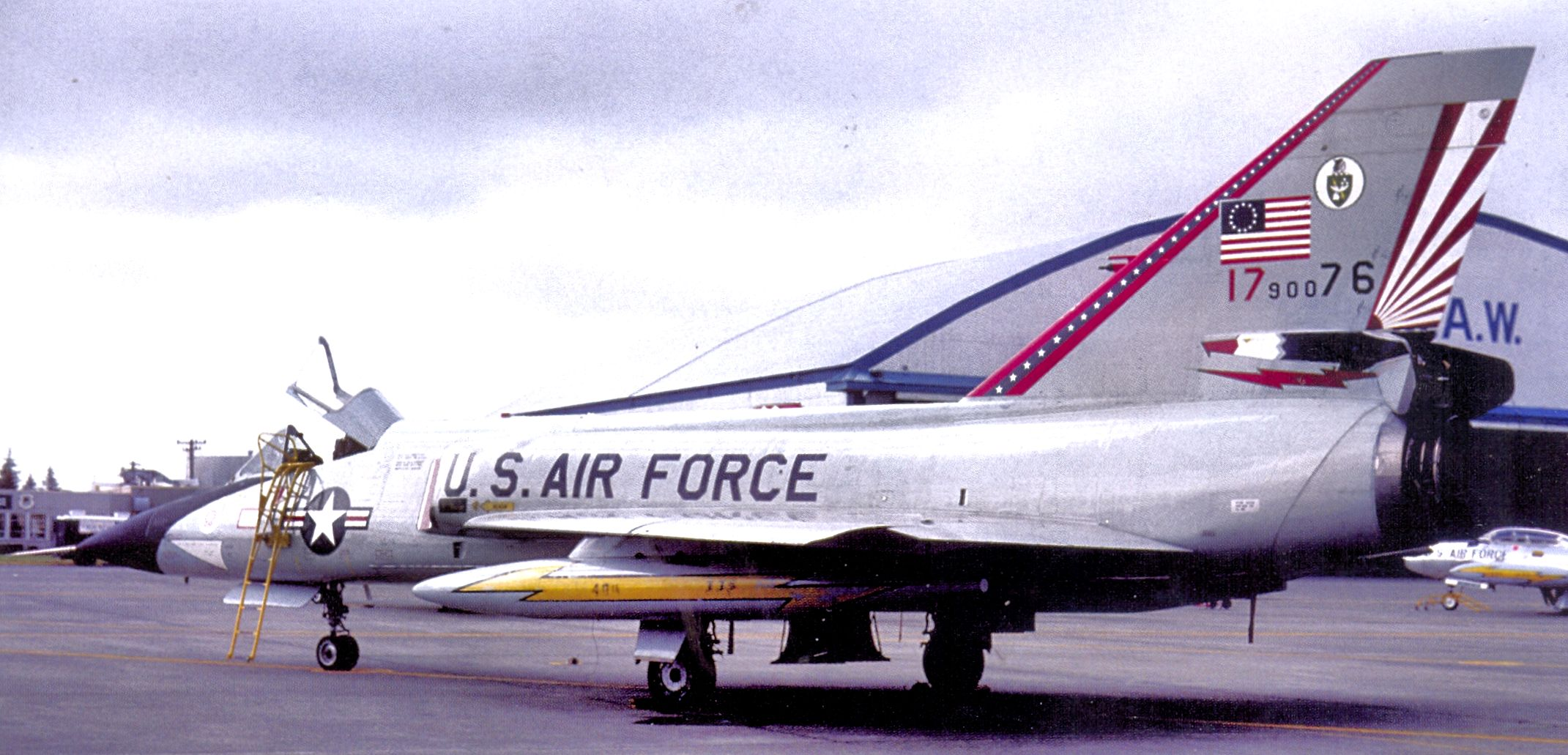
49th FIS Convair F-106A Delta Dart, AF Ser. No. 59-0076, in Bicentennial markings, 1976

Although many aircraft landed at Griffiss during the war, the airfield had no permanently stationed flying units. It wasn't until after World War II that the Air Force Reserve 65th Reconnaissance Group conducted aerial photo and mapping operations from Griffiss, from 27 December 1946 until being inactivated on 27 June 1949.

On 3 October 1950, the 1st Fighter-Interceptor Group of Air Defense Command (ADC) became the first permanently assigned USAF flying unit at Griffiss. Although the group moved to California in 1951, its 27th Fighter-Interceptor Squadron (FIS) remained behind. ADC units were stationed there for the next 30 years, as Griffiss became a center for the Northeast air defense mission and was the headquarters of the Northeast Air Defense Sector. The 27th FIS flew Lockheed F-80 Shooting Stars, North American F-86 Sabres, Northrop F-89 Scorpion, Lockheed F-94 Starfires and Convair F-102 Delta Daggers before leaving Griffiss in 1959.

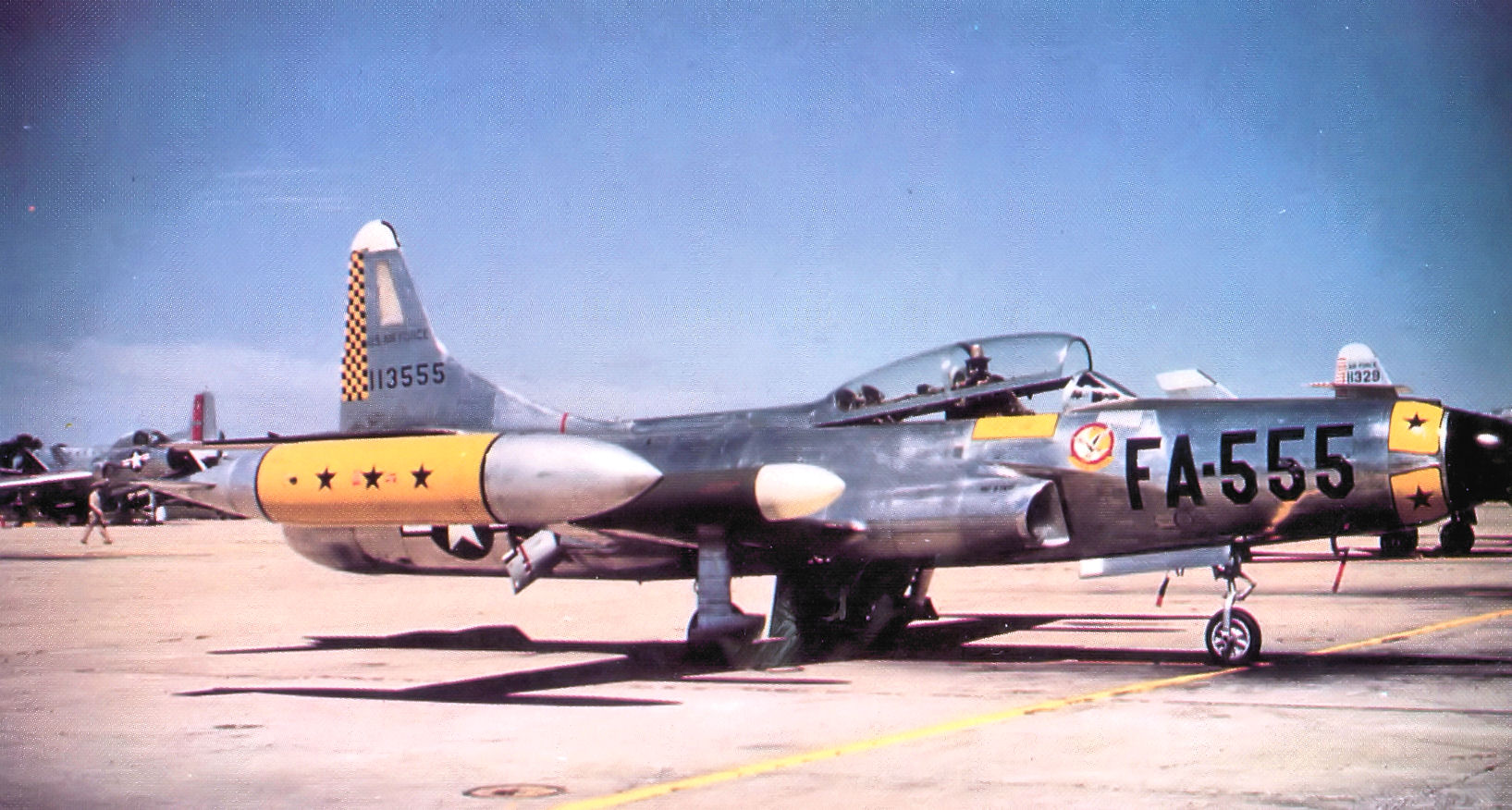
27th Fighter-Interceptor Squadron Lockheed F-94C Starfire, AF Ser. No. 51-13555, circa 1955

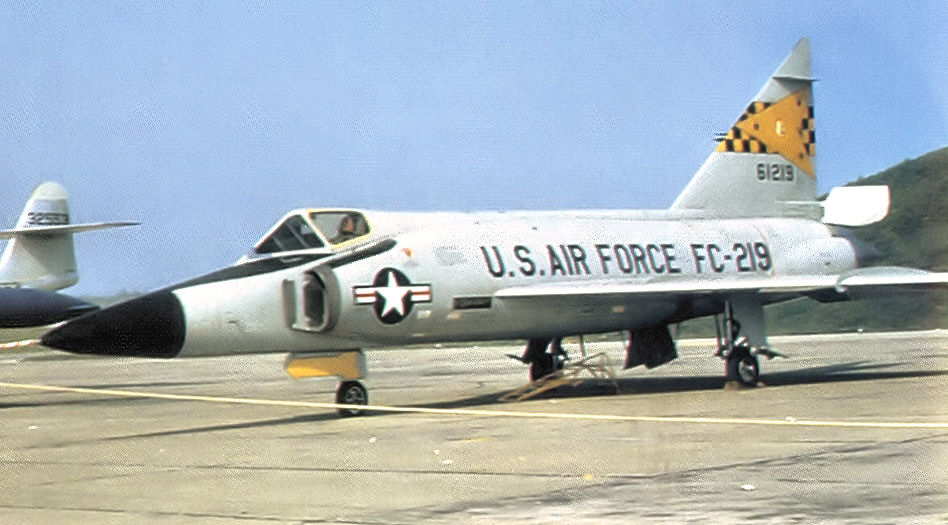
27th FIS F-102A Delta Dagger, AF Ser. No 56-1219, circa 1958

In October, 1955, the 465th Fighter-Interceptor Squadron was assigned to Griffiss with F-89 Scorpion all-weather fighters. ADC activated the 4727th Air Defense Group as a headquarters for the two squadrons in February, 1957, and it became a major tenant at Griffiss. The 49th FIS moved—less personnel, equipment and aircraft—from Hanscom AFB, Massachusetts and replaced the 465th FIS in October, 1959, receiving, after the transfer, its McDonnell F-101 Voodoos. Later that year, when the 27th FIS departed Griffiss, the 4727th was discontinued.

=== Rome Laboratory ===
Electronic research began at the Rome Air Depot in 1949. The Watson Laboratory complex was transferred to Rome from Red Bank, New Jersey between 1950 and 1951. The Rome Air Development Center was established at the base on 12 June 1951, as a response to the electronics needs of air forces learned by the U.S. Army Signal Corps during the war. It formed part of Air Research and Development Command. In 1991, as a response to its changing role, the RADC was renamed the Rome Laboratory.

=== Strategic Air Command ===
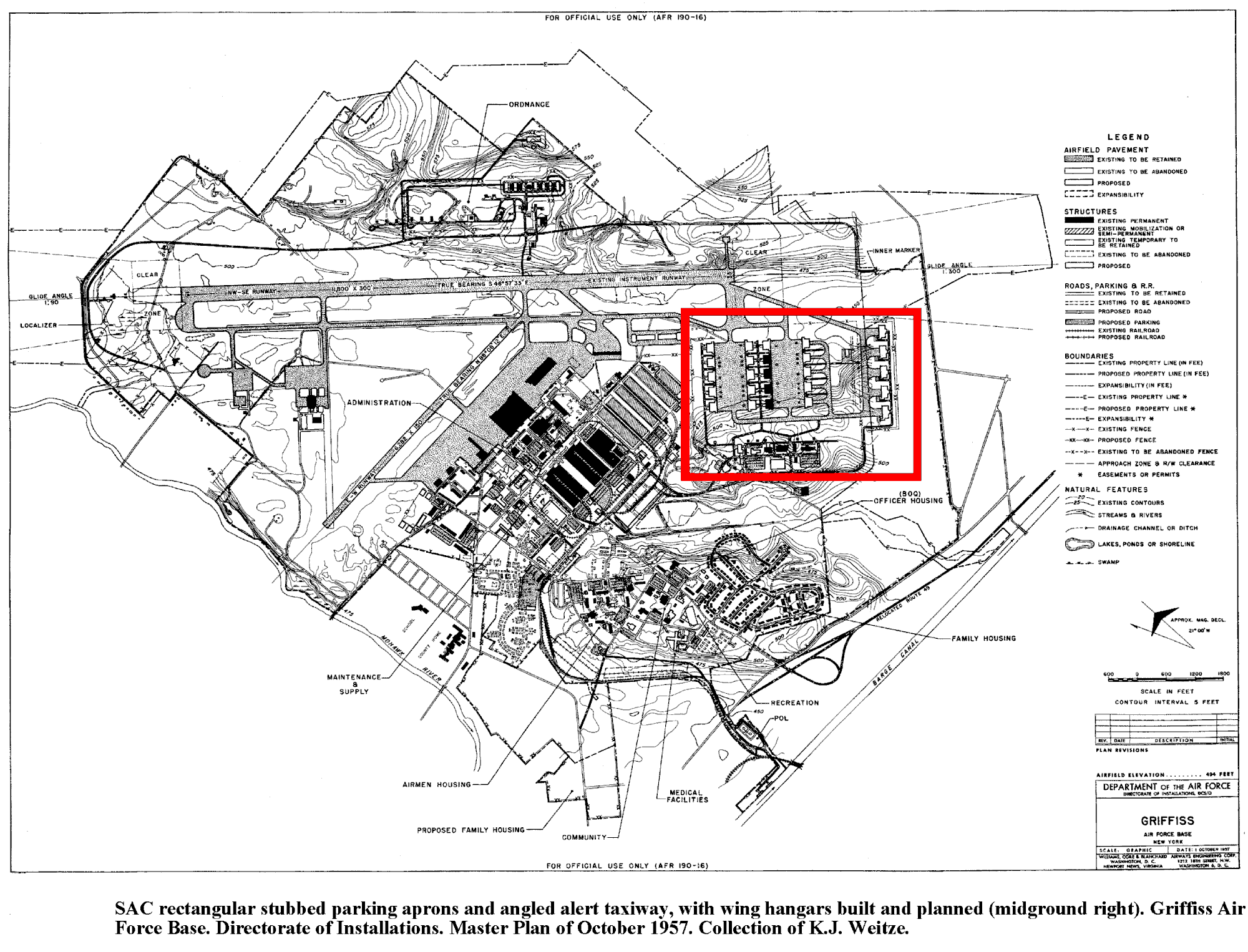
Master plan for Griffiss

On 1 August 1958, Strategic Air Command (SAC) established the 4039th Strategic Wing at Griffiss AFB as part of SAC's plan to disperse its Boeing B-52 Stratofortress heavy bombers over a larger number of bases, thus making it more difficult for the Soviet Union to knock out the entire fleet with a surprise first strike. The wing had both B-52s and KC-135 Stratotanker aerial refuelling aircraft. In 1963, the 4039th Strategic Wing was replaced by the 416th Bombardment Wing.

Wing crews and aircraft deployed to the Pacific during the Vietnam War to bomb targets in both North and South Vietnam. In November 1984 the base was added to the National Priorities List because hazardous chemicals were found in soil and ground water. Solvents, lead and polychlorinated biphenyls (PCBs) had been disposed in landfills and dry wells.

Prior to the 1986 United States bombing of Libya, a Lockheed SR-71 Blackbird Mach 3.2 supersonic reconnaissance aircraft left Beale Air Force Base in California and, using multiple KC-135 midair refuelings plus a Griffiss land refueling each way, did the approximately 12,000-mile round-trip in less than half a day.

In 1988 the wing took up a primarily conventional role. In 1991, wing crews and aircraft bombed Iraqi targets after the Invasion of Kuwait, during the Gulf War.

On 1 June 1992, as part of the disestablishment of SAC, the wing's Boeing KC-135 aerial refuelling aircraft were transferred to the newly established Air Mobility Command (AMC). The 416th retained its B-52 aircraft and the wing was transferred to the newly established Air Combat Command (ACC); Griffiss became an ACC base. The wing was inactivated in 1995, and the base closed.

Among the tenant activities at Griffiss AFB, the base was also home to a U.S. Army aviation brigade from 1988. The 10th Mountain Division was set up at Fort Drum from 198X. Yet there was no space at the fort for the division's aviation units. Despite this, the division's aviation brigade was technically activated in April 1988 at Fort Drum. In actual fact, the Combat Aviation Brigade, 10th Mountain Division was activated on 2 July 1988 at Griffiss AFB. Several years afterwards, the brigade moved to Fort Drum.

At its peak, the base was the largest employer in Oneida County.

=== Civilian airport, 1995-present ===
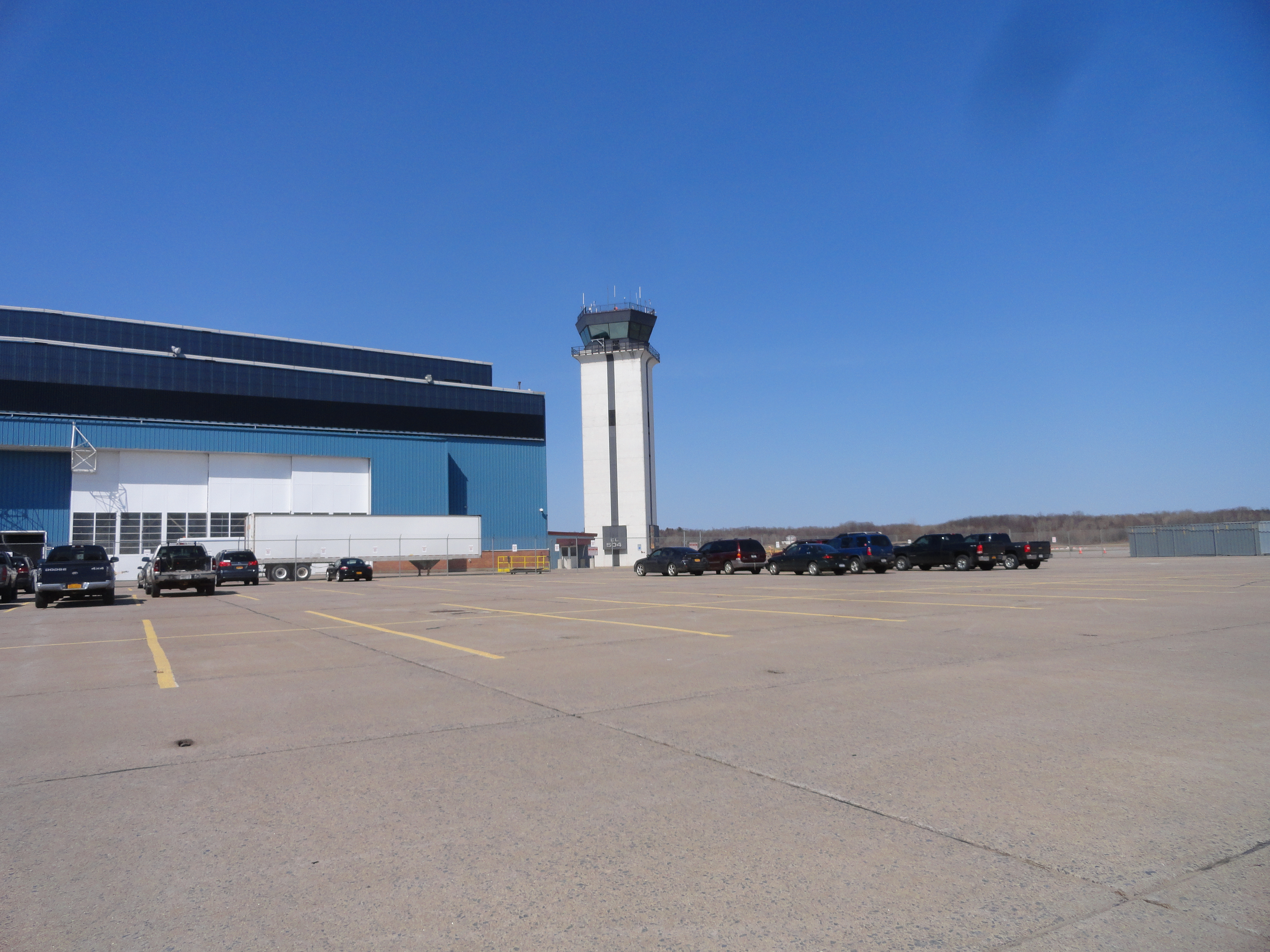
The airport control tower

Griffiss AFB was selected for realignment by the Base Realignment and Closure Commission in 1993. It was closed in September 1995. The base closure on 30 September 1995 meant that 5,000 jobs or 30 percent of the city's economic base were lost. The population decreased by almost 10,000, from 44,350 in 1990 to 34,950 in 2000. The Air Force Research Laboratory had not been closed, and became core of the redevelopment plan, of making it part of a corporate business and to build a technology park around it. In 2004, a new $24 million facility opened.

The former base complex is now home to the Griffiss Business and Technology Park. Post-closure, two Air Force activities remained: the Rome Research Site of the Air Force Research Laboratory, and the Eastern Air Defense Sector (EADS) of the North American Aerospace Defense Command (NORAD) as operated by the New York Air National Guard from a small complex of buildings in the Technology Park.

Griffiss was the site of the Woodstock '99 music festival in late July 1999. Notorious for overpricing, triple-digit heat, aggressive music, and lack of water, it descended into chaotic destruction and blazes with riot police deployed and making mass arrests, although base assets were unscathed.

In December 2013, Griffiss International Airport was selected as a test site by the Federal Aviation Administration (FAA) to "aid in researching the complexities of integrating Unmanned Aircraft Systems into the congested, northeast airspace." Students from the Rochester Institute of Technology will work with Griffiss to test drones at the airport.

With the construction of a new terminal building in 2015, public officials hoped to secure additional investment in the facility to attract passenger airlines. The new terminal building also allows for international flights to the airport, as it was constructed to accommodate a US Customs and Border Protection-regulation facility for potential international passengers.

== Environmental contamination ==
Griffiss AFB was designated a superfund site in 1984 because solvents, lead and polychlorinated biphenyls (PCBs) had been disposed in landfills and dry wells. These manmade pollutants contaminated Three Mile Creek and Sixmile Creek, and ground water beneath portions of the base, and led to accumulation of volatile organic compounds (VOCs). Leaking underground storage tanks and soil contamination were dug out. People affected by contaminated well water received bottled water until, in 1991, everyone was connected to the municipal water supply. By 2013, 27 of the 31 "areas of concern" identified in 1995 had been cleaned up or addressed otherwise, and did not need "further action" per EPA.

== Air Force major commands ==
- USAAF Materiel Div, 1 February 1942 (became Materiel Comd, 16 March 1942)
- USAAF Materiel and Services, 17 July 1944 (became AAF Technical Service Comd, 31 August 1944
- Air Technical Service Command, 1 July 1945
- Air Materiel Command, 9 March 1946)
- Air Research and Development Command, 2 April 1951
- Air Materiel Command, 1 July 1954

Redesignated: Air Force Logistics Command, 1 April 1961

- Strategic Air Command, 1 July 1970 – 1 June 1992
- Air Combat Command, 1 June 1992 – 30 September 1995
- Air Force Materiel Command, 1 October 1995–present

== Air Force major units ==
- Rome Air Depot, 1 February 1942 – 3 January 1955
- Rome Air Material Area, 1 February 1943 – 25 June 1947
- 4104th Army Air Force Base Unit, 1 April 1944 – 15 April 1945
- 65th Reconnaissance Group, 27 December 1946 – 27 June 1949
- 1st Fighter-Interceptor Group, 15 August 1950 – 3 June 1951

71st Fighter-Interceptor Squadron, 15 August – 21 October 1950
27th Fighter-Interceptor Squadron, 15 August 1950 – 1 October 1959

- Rome Air Development Center, March/April 1951 - 1990
- 6530th Air Base Wing, 12 June 1951 – 1 August 1952
- Rome Air Force Depot, 3 January 1955 – 1 April 1967
- 465th Fighter-Interceptor Squadron, 8 October 1955 – 1 July 1959
- 2856th Air Base Wing, 16 February 1958 – 1 July 1970
- 4727th Air Defense Group, 8 February 1957 – 15 October 1959

49th Fighter-Interceptor Squadron, 1 July 1959 – 7 July 1987

- 4039th Strategic Wing, 1 August 1958 – 1 February 1963
- 41st Air Refueling Squadron, 5 January 1959 – 1992
- 416th Bombardment Wing, 1 February 1963 – 1995
- 485th Electronic Installation Squadron (later 485th Communications Installation Group, 485th Engineering Installation Group) January 1972 - 1995
- 21st Air Division, 31 August – 23 September 1983
- 24th Air Division, 1 December 1983 – 30 September 1990
- 509th Air Refueling Squadron, 1 July 1990 – 1 October 1994
- Northern Communications Area of the Air Force Communications Service, 1 May 1970 – 1 June 1981
- 2019th Airways & Air Communications Service Squadron (later 2019th Communications Squadron), 1 November 1954 – 31 July 1977
- 2019th Communications Squadron (Later the 2019th Information Systems Squadron, 2019th Communications Squadron, 416th Communications Squadron), 1 July 1980 – 30 June 1995
