= Townsend Griffiss =

US Army aviator (1900–1942)

Townsend E. Griffiss
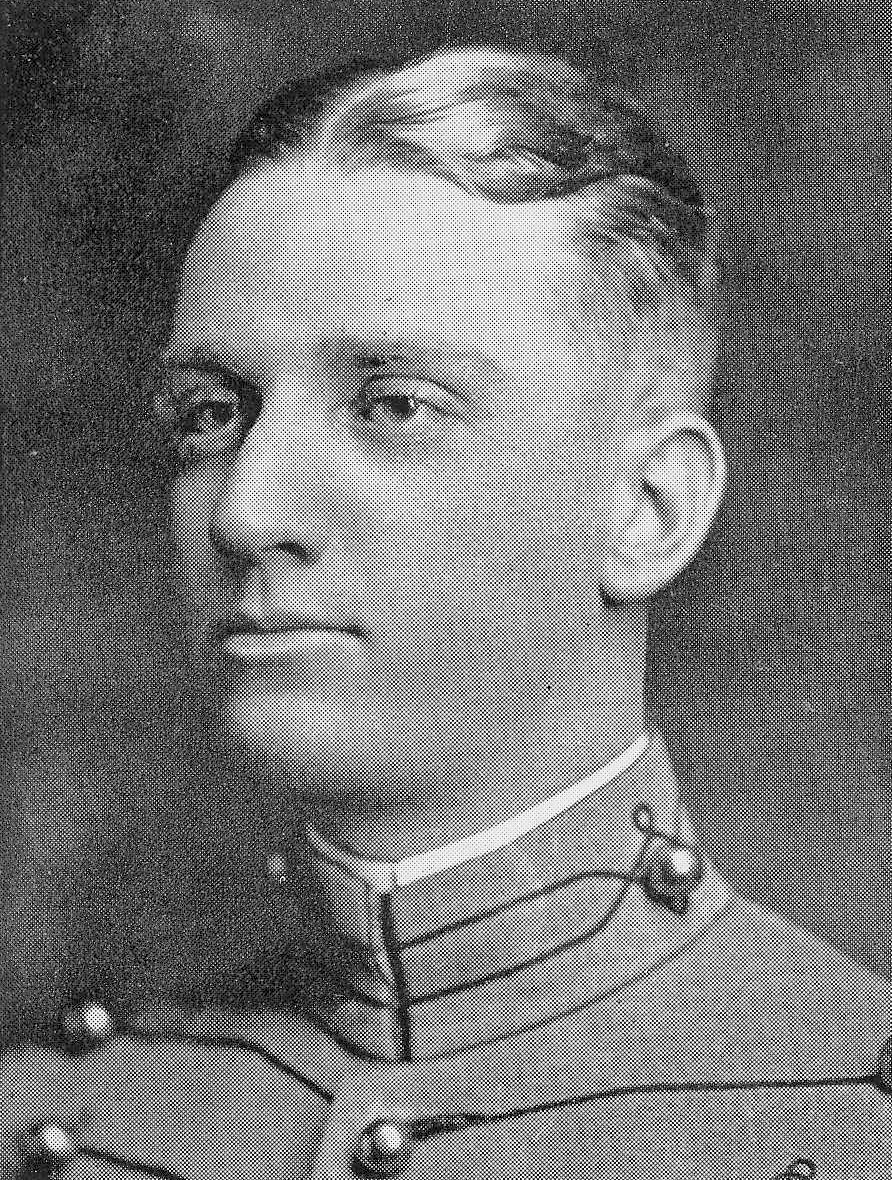
- Griffiss at West Point in 1922
- Born: April 4, 1900; Buffalo, New York, U.S.
- Died: February 15, 1942 (aged 41); English Channel, U.K.
- Burial place: Forest Lawn Cemetery; Buffalo, New York
- Military career
- Allegiance: United States
- Branch: U.S. Army Air Forces
- Service years: 1923–1942
- Rank: Lieutenant Colonel
- Awards: France's Légion d'honneur (1938); Distinguished Service Medal (1942)

Lieutenant Colonel Townsend E. Griffiss (April 4, 1900 – February 15, 1942) was a United States Army Air Forces aviator, the first American airman killed in Europe following the United States' entry into World War II.

== Early life ==
Griffiss was born in Buffalo, New York, to polo player Ellicott Evans and Katherine Hamlin, both from wealthy New York families. His mother later married San Diego banker Wilmot Griffiss and Townsend took his surname. Known to his family as "Tim," he was raised in Coronado, California, an affluent coastal suburb of San Diego.

== Professional career ==
Griffiss graduated from the United States Military Academy at West Point in 1922, (Note: Griffiss was a member of the class of 1923, but chose to graduate at the end of his third year under provisions of an Act of Congress.) and joined the U.S. Army Air Corps. He trained as a fighter pilot in Texas, then served in Hawaii from 1925 to 1928. His family's wealth allowed him to rent a house on Waikiki Beach, and there he wrote a guidebook, When You Go to Hawaii You Will Need This Guide to the Islands, which was published in 1930. He shared his birth-father's passion for polo, and joined the military team based in Hawaii, led by Major George S. Patton.

After operational postings in California and Texas, Griffiss was assigned to Bolling Field in Washington, D.C. in 1933. This helped him gain connections to allow him to be posted to Europe in 1935 as an air attache, working in Paris, then Berlin. He was assigned to Spain during the Spanish Civil War, as an observer. Returning to Paris, he was awarded the Légion d'honneur.

Returning to the United States in 1938, he became a student at the Air Corps Tactical School. In 1939 he worked for the Assistant Secretary of War, and then for the War Department Chief of Staff, and in 1940 he was promoted to major.

In 1941, with Europe already at war but before the United States had entered World War II, Griffiss was seconded to London. There he was part of the staff of General James E. Chaney, the Special Observer Group (SPOBS), which was coordinating U.S. military cooperation with Great Britain, and organizing the US occupation of Iceland. Ordered to the Soviet Union to discuss planning for US air cargo flights between Alaska and the Russian Far East, Griffiss spent two months in Moscow, before moving to Kuibyshev when advancing Nazi Germany forces threatened to overrun Moscow. In November, he was promoted to lieutenant colonel.

== Death ==
Griffiss died at age 41 in February 1942, on the last leg of his return journey from the Soviet Union, via Tehran and Cairo. The B-24 Liberator bomber in which he was a passenger was mistakenly shot down over the English Channel by Polish fliers in the Royal Air Force (RAF), thus becoming the first American aviator killed in the Europe during the war.

Arriving on an unusual route over occupied Europe, the then-unfamiliar B-24 was mistaken for a four-engine Focke-Wulf 200; the intercepting Spitfire pilots were based in Exeter and had not been adequately briefed about the inbound B-24 flight, which ended south of the Eddystone Lighthouse. All nine aboard were never recovered and the incident was a major embarrassment for the Air Ministry.

Griffiss was posthumously awarded the Army's Distinguished Service Medal. His body was not recovered; there are memorials to him in Buffalo at Forest Lawn Cemetery and in England at the Cambridge American Cemetery and Memorial.

== Legacy ==
Camp Griffiss, a U.S. military base in Bushy Park, London, was named after him. It served as the European Headquarters for the USAAF from July 1942 to December 1944 and was General Dwight Eisenhower's SHAEF headquarters. The USAF had originally named the Fort Worth Army Airfield in Texas as "Griffiss Air Force Base" on January 1, 1948, but it was soon changed on February 27 to memorialize native son and Medal of Honor winner Major Horace Carswell, who gave his life while attempting to crash land his crippled B-24 over China.

Later that year, Rome Air Depot, an Air Corps facility in central New York state at Rome (which opened the month Griffiss died), was renamed Griffiss Air Force Base; USAF aircraft operated from there until 1995, when the base was closed. It is now Griffiss International Airport and Griffiss Business Park, which supports a detachment of the Air Force Research Laboratory.

His great-nephew (sister's grandson) and namesake is Rear Admiral Townsend Griffiss Alexander of the U.S. Navy, who retired from active duty in 2013.
