= 4727th Air Defense Group =

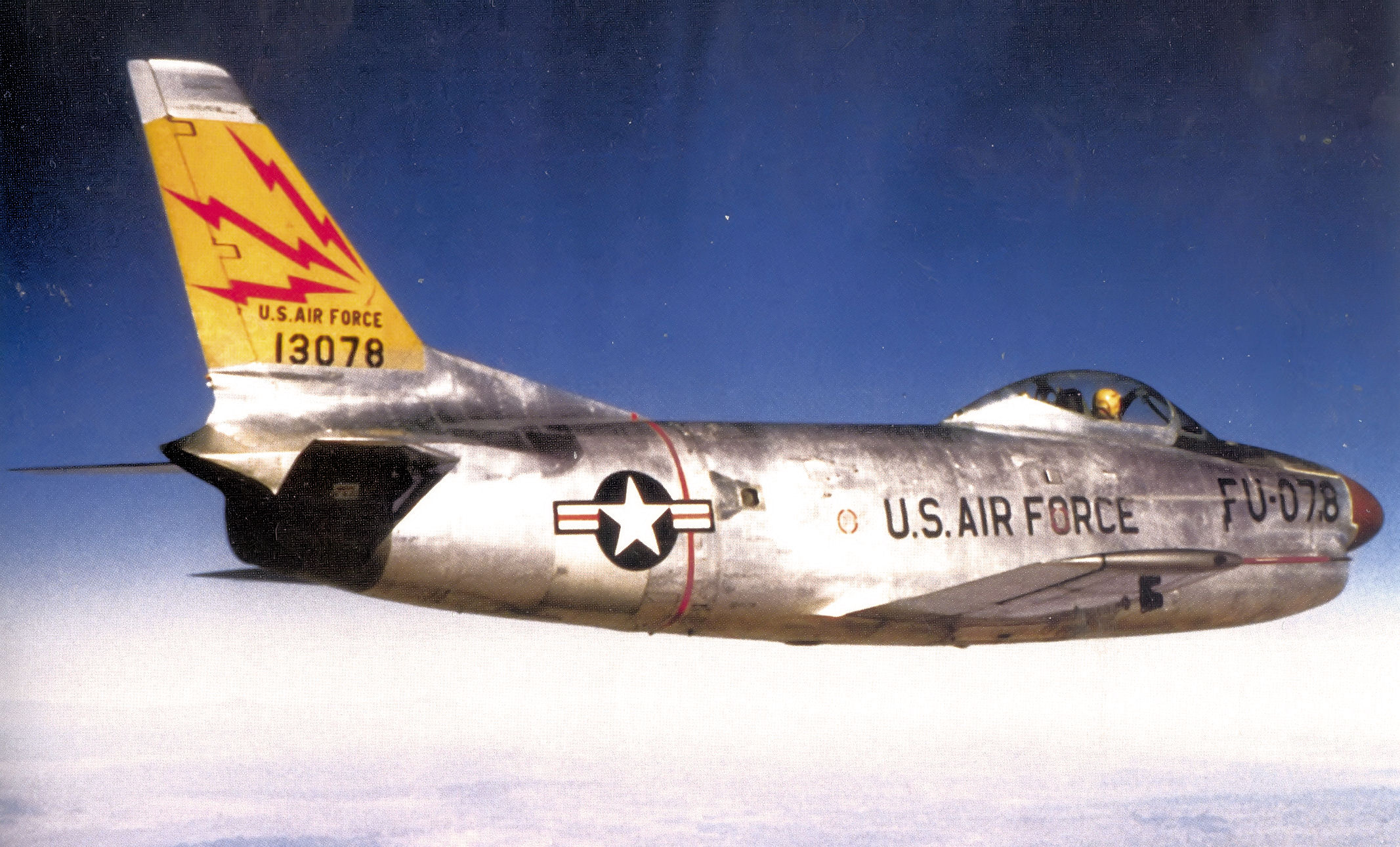
- 465th Fighter-Interceptor Squadron F-86D Sabre, Griffiss AFB, New York (Note: Airplane is North American F-86D-25-NA Sabre, serial 51-3078. This plane was destroyed in a midair collision on 12 December 1954. Dirkx, Marco (20 July 2025). "1951 USAF Serial Numbers". Joe Baugher’s Serial Number List..)
- Active: 1957–1959
- Country: United States
- Branch: United States Air Force
- Type: Fighter interceptor
- Role: Air defense

Insignia
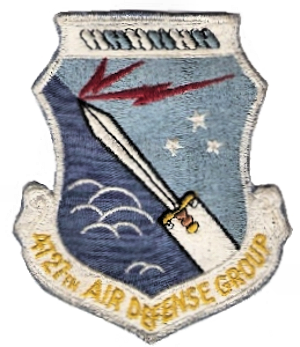
- Patch with 4727th Air Defense Group emblem

The 4727th Air Defense Group is a discontinued United States Air Force organization. Its last assignment was with the Syracuse Air Defense Sector at Griffiss Air Force Base, New York, where it was discontinued in 1959.

The group was formed to provide a single command and support organization for the two fighter interceptor squadrons of Air Defense Command, that were tenants at Griffiss, an Air Materiel Command base. It was also assigned a maintenance squadron to perform aircraft maintenance. It was discontinued after the 27th Fighter-Interceptor Squadron moved in 1959, leaving only a single fighter squadron at Griffiss.

== History ==
The group was established to provide a headquarters for Air Defense Command (ADC) fighter-interceptor squadrons stationed at Griffiss Air Force Base, an Air Materiel Command base, whose Rome Air Force Depot (until February 1958) and 2856th Air Base Wing (after February 1958) acted as host base organizations for the group. The 4727th was assigned the 27th Fighter-Interceptor Squadron, flying Lockheed F-94 Starfire aircraft and the 465th Fighter-Interceptor Squadron, flying Northrop F-89 Scorpions as its operational components. The interceptor aircraft assigned to these squadrons were armed with Folding-Fin Aerial Rockets. The F-89s were also armed with Falcon missiles or Genie rockets. All assigned aircraft were equipped with data link for interception control through the Semi-Automatic Ground Environment system

The 27th and 465th Squadrons were already stationed at Griffiss and had been assigned to the 4711th Air Defense Wing. Group aircraft maintenance was centralized in the 606th Consolidated Aircraft Maintenance Squadron (CAMS), which was activated at Griffiss in August. The 27th FIS converted to Convair F-102 Delta Daggers in the fall of 1957.

In July 1959 The 465th and the 49th Fighter-Interceptor Squadron, which was stationed at Hanscom Air Force Base, Massachusetts, swapped equipment, personnel, and stations. The group was discontinued when the 27th moved to Loring Air Force Base, Maine in October 1959, leaving only a single operational ADC squadron at Griffiss. The 49th was then assigned directly to the Syracuse Air Defense Sector, and the 606th CAMS was inactivated.

=== Lineage ===
- Designated as 4727th Air Defense Group and organized on 8 February 1957

Discontinued on 15 October 1959

=== Assignments ===
- 32d Air Division, 8 February 1957 – 1 August 1958
- Syracuse Air Defense Sector, 1 August 1958 – 15 October 1959

=== Stations ===
- Griffiss Air Force Base, New York, 8 February 1957 – 15 October 1959

=== Components ===
- 27th Fighter-Interceptor Squadron, 8 February 1957 – 1 October 1959
- 49th Fighter-Interceptor Squadron, 1 July 1959 −15 October 1959
- 465th Fighter-Interceptor Squadron, 8 February 1957 – 1 July 1959
- 606th Consolidated Aircraft Maintenance Squadron 8 August 1957 - 1 July 1959

=== Commanders ===
- Col. Frank J. Keller, by 1 January 1958 - after 31 December 1958

=== Aircraft ===
- North American F-89H Sabre, 1957-1959
- Northrop F-89J Scorpion, 1957-1959
- Lockheed F-94C Starfighter, 1957
- Convair F-102A Delta Dagger, 1957-1959

== See also ==
- Aerospace Defense Command Fighter Squadrons
- F-89 Scorpion units of the United States Air Force
- F-94 Starfire units of the United States Air Force
