= 465th Air Refueling Squadron =

465th Air Refueling Squadron

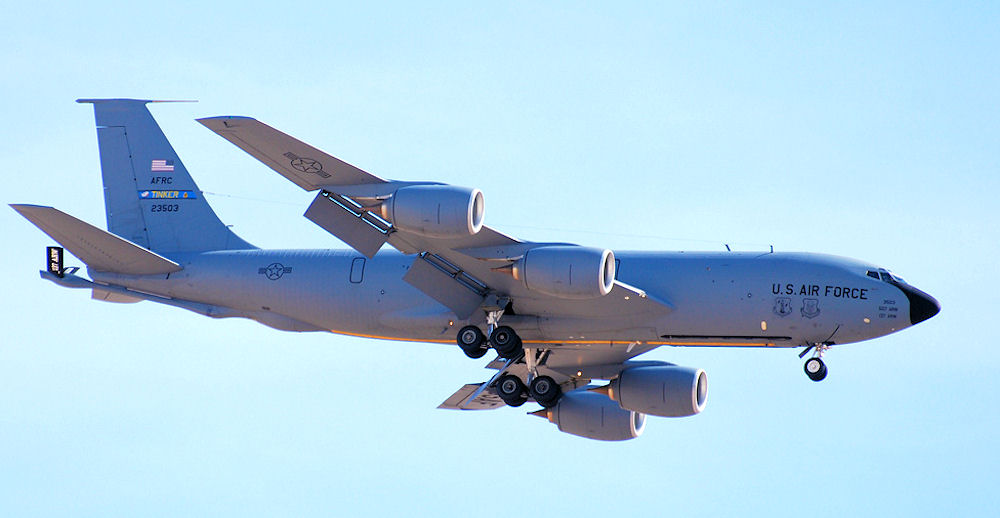
- A 465th Air Refueling Squadron KC-135R (Note: Aircraft is Boeing KC-135A-BN Stratotanker serial 62-3503)
- Active: 1944–1946; 1953–1955; 1955–1960; 1972–present
- Country: United States
- Branch: United States Air Force
- Role: Air refueling
- Part of: Air Force Reserve Command
- Garrison/HQ: Tinker Air Force Base
- Engagements: World War II Asia-Pacific Theater

- Decorations: Distinguished Unit Citation; Air Force Outstanding Unit Award

Insignia
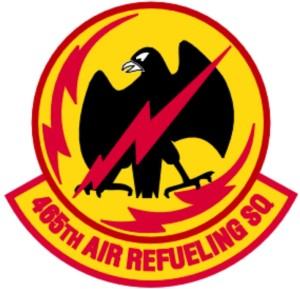
- 465th Air Refueling Squadron emblem

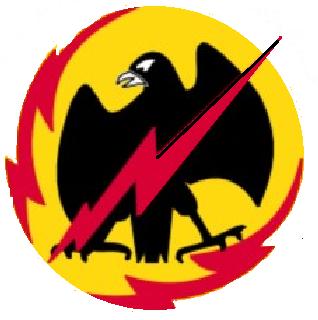
- 465th Fighter-Interceptor Squadron emblem (Note: Approved 22 August 1955.)

The 465th Air Refueling Squadron is a United States Air Force Reserve squadron, assigned to the 507th Operations Group, 507th Air Refueling Wing, stationed at Tinker Air Force Base, Oklahoma. The squadron operates the KC-135R aircraft conducting aerial refueling missions.

== Overview ==
The squadron operates Boeing KC-135 Stratotanker aircraft conducting air refueling missions. It is one of three flying organizations in the 507th Air Refueling Wing, incorporating pilots and traditional operations functions.

As civilians, many of the pilots assigned to the refueling squadron are employed by commercial airlines. As reservists, they are required to fly the same type sorties as their active-duty counterparts to remain proficient and combat ready.

== History ==
=== World War II ===
Formed in late 1944 as the 465th Fighter Squadron and trained under II Fighter Command in the midwest and Texas. Equipped with the very long range Republic P-47N Thunderbolt with a combat mission to escort Boeing B-29 Superfortress bombers from their bases in the Mariana Islands to Japan.

Following months of delays, the squadron arrived in the Pacific Theater, being assigned to Ie Shima in the Ryukyu Islands on 28 June 1945 from Saipan/Tinian. During forty-six days of combat, the squadron flew forty-six missions. With the end of the war, the squadron was reassigned to Yontan Air Base, Okinawa in January 1946 conducting occupation duty. It was inactivated on 24 May 1946.

=== Air Defense Command ===
Activated 18 February 1953 by Air Defense Command at McChord Air Force Base, Washington, equipped with North American F-86D Sabres with an air defense mission. Inactivated 18 August 1955 IAW Project Arrow when parent 567th Air Defense Group inactivated and replaced 325th Fighter Group (Air Defense).

Reactivated 8 October 1955 at Griffiss Air Force Base, New York and assigned to 32d Air Division with Northrop F-89D Scorpions; converted to F-89H/J Scorpions in the fall of 1956; transferred to 4727th Air Defense Group in February 1957; moved to Hanscom Air Force Base, Massachusetts and reassigned to Boston Air Defense Sector in August 1959, acquiring North American F-86L Sabres in a swap with the 49th Fighter-Interceptor Squadron; inactivated 15 March 1960 as the Sabre was being phased out in favor of supersonic interceptors.

=== Air Force Reserve ===
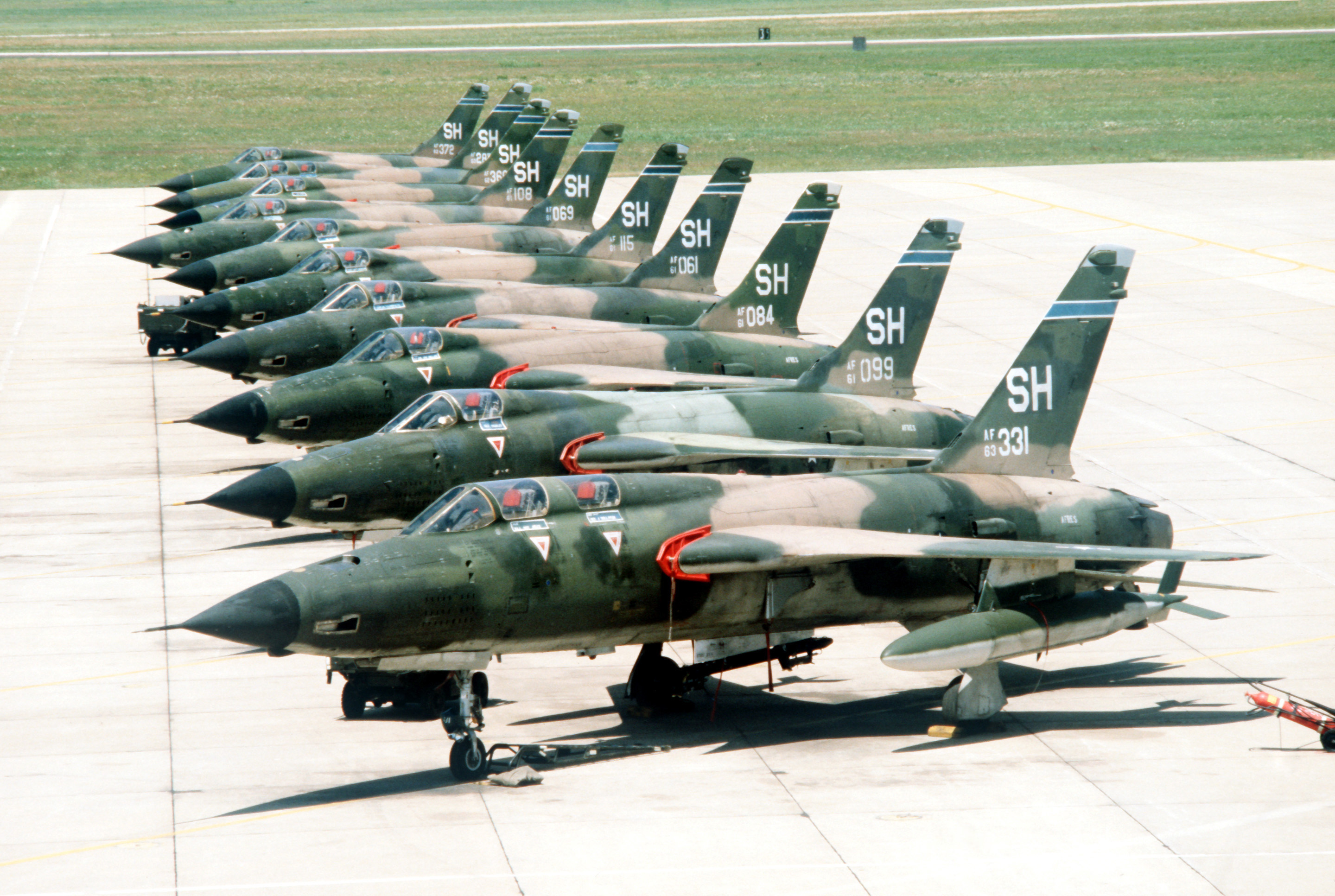
465th TFS F-105s, 1978

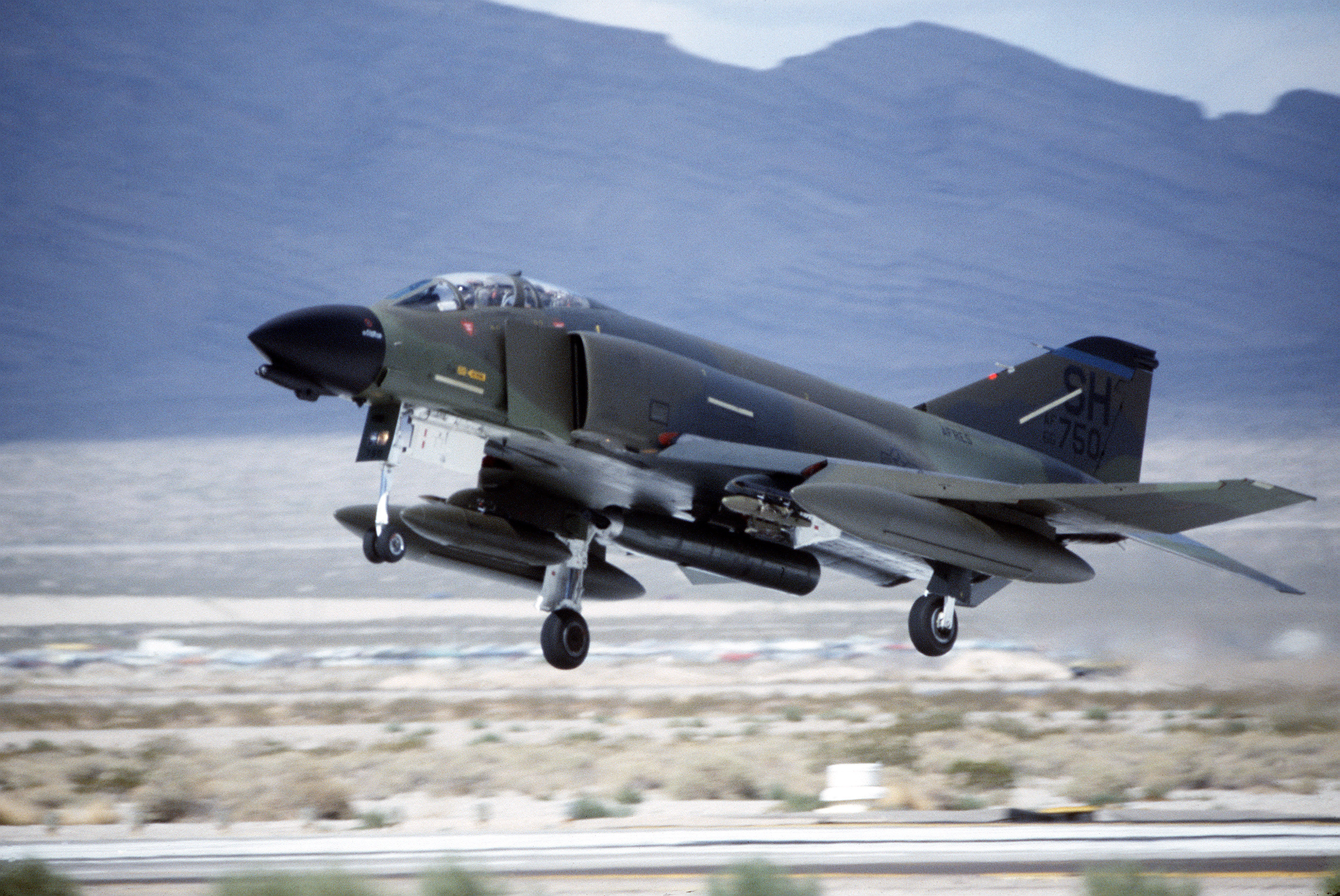
A 465th TFS F-4D, 1985

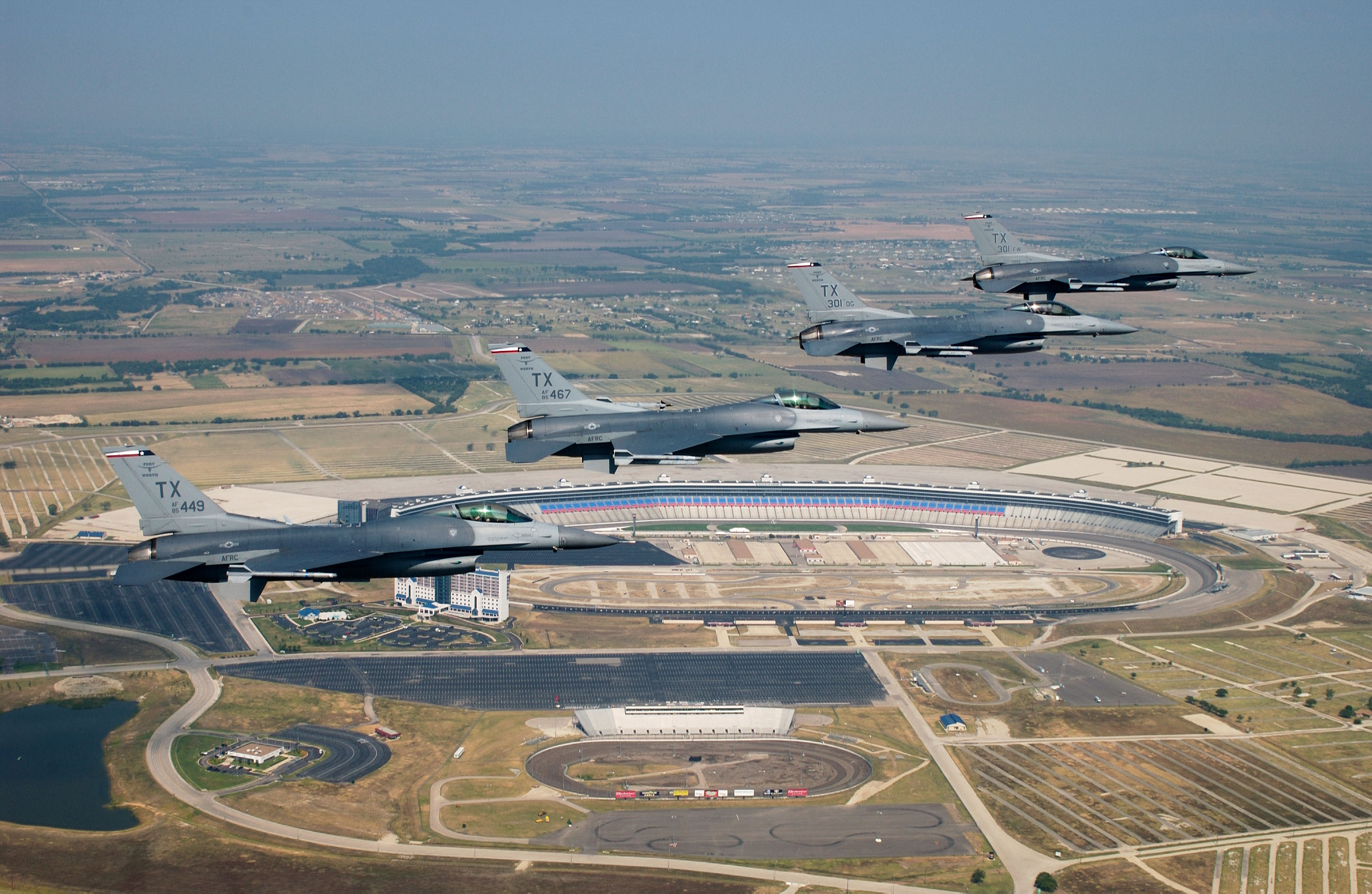
301st TFW F-16Cs, 2003

It trained for fighter missions between 1972 and 1994 and has flown worldwide air refueling missions since 1994.

== Lineage ==
- Constituted as the 465th Fighter Squadron, Single Engine on 5 October 1944

Activated on 12 October 1944
Inactivated on 24 May 1946

- Redesignated 465th Fighter-Interceptor Squadron on 3 February 1953

Activated on 18 February 1953
Inactivated on 18 August 1955

- Activated on 8 October 1955

Discontinued on 15 March 1960

- Redesignated 465th Tactical Fighter Squadron on 4 May 1972 (Note: From December 1972 to January 1977, there was also an unrelated 465th Tactical Fighter Training Squadron in the Regular Air Force.)

Activated in the reserve on 20 May 1972
Redesignated 465th Fighter Squadron on 1 February 1992
Redesignated 465th Air Refueling Squadron on 1 April 1994

=== Assignments ===
- 507th Fighter Group, 12 October 1944 – 24 May 1946
- 567th Air Defense Group, 18 February 1953 – 18 August 1955
- 4711th Air Defense Wing, 8 October 1955
- 32d Air Division, 1 March 1956
- 4727th Air Defense Group, 8 February 1957
- Boston Air Defense Sector, 1 July 1959 – 15 March 1960
- 507th Fighter Group, 20 May 1972
- 301st Tactical Fighter Wing, 25 March 1973
- 507th Tactical Fighter Group (later 507 Fighter Group), 17 October 1975
- 507th Operations Group, 1 August 1992 – present

=== Stations ===
- Peterson Field, Colorado, 12 October 1944
- Bruning Army Air Field, Nebraska, 20 October 1944
- Dalhart Army Air Field, Texas, 15 December 1944 – 30 April 1945
- Ie Shima Airfield, Ryukyu Islands, 24 June 1945
- Yontan Airfield, Okinawa, 29 January-24 May 1946
- McChord Air Force Base, Washington, 18 February 1953 – 18 August 1955
- Griffiss Air Force Base, New York, 8 October 1955
- Laurence G. Hanscom Field, Massachusetts, 1 July 1959 – 15 March 1960
- Tinker Air Force Base, Oklahoma, 20 May 1972 – present

=== Aircraft ===
- Republic P-47 Thunderbolt, 1944–1945
- North American F-86D Sabre, 1953–1955, 1959–1959
- Northrop F-89D Scorpion, 1955–1959
- North American F-86L Sabre, 1959–1960
- Republic F-105 Thunderchief, 1972–1980
- McDonnell F-4 Phantom II, 1980–1988
- General Dynamics F-16 Fighting Falcon, 1988–1994
- Boeing KC-135 Stratotanker, 1994–present
