= 27th Fighter Squadron =

United States Air Force combat squadron

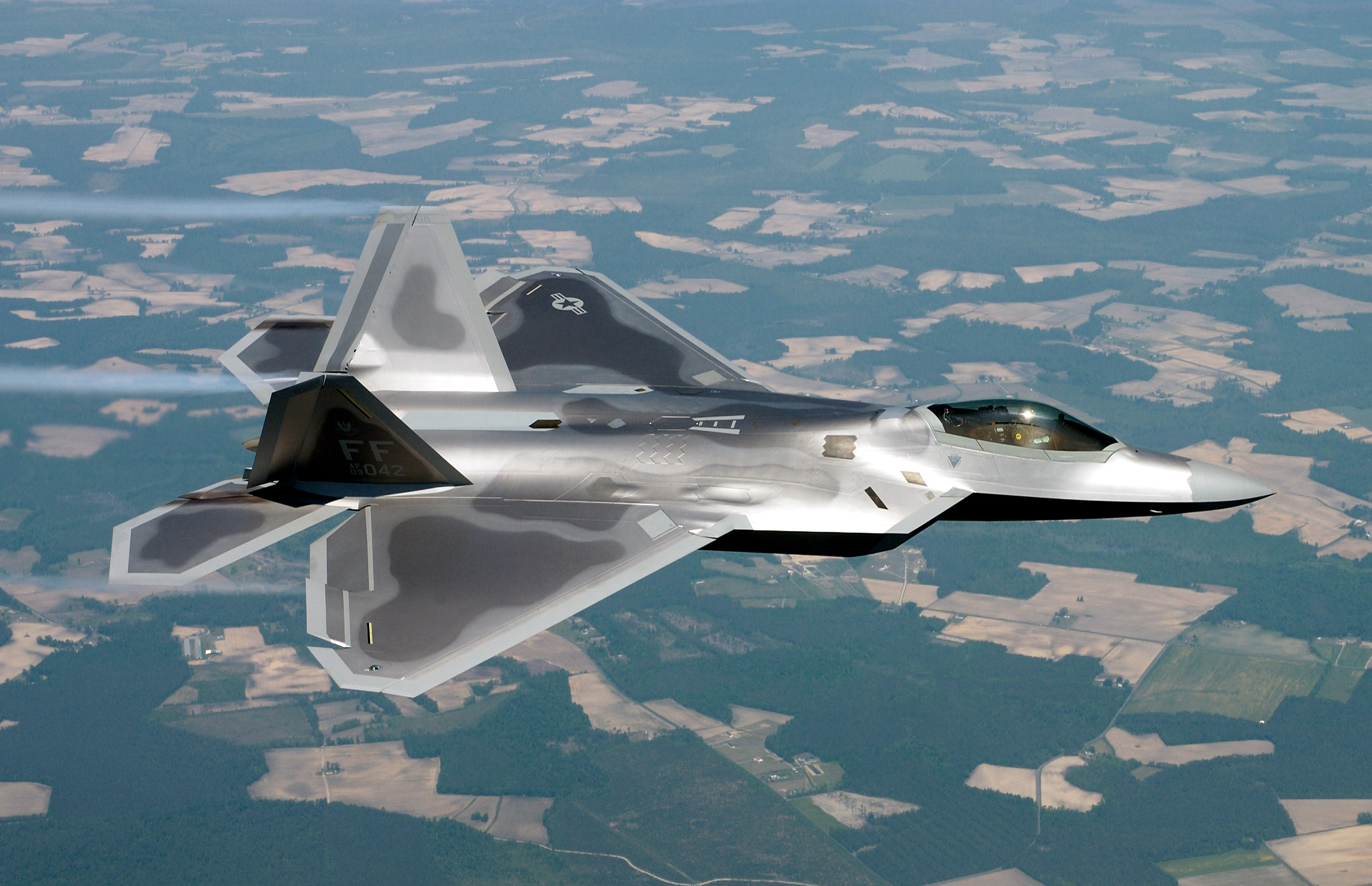
- F-22A serial 03-4042, the first F-22A Assigned to the 27th Fighter Squadron, 2005
- Active: 1917–1945; 1946–present
- Country: United States
- Branch: United States Air Force
- Type: Squadron
- Role: Fighter; Air Dominance
- Part of: Air Combat Command
- Garrison/HQ: Joint Base Langley–Eustis, Virginia
- Nickname: Fighting Eagles
- Tail code: "FF"
- Engagements: World War I; World War II – Antisubmarine; World War II – EAME Theater; 1991 Gulf War (Defense of Saudi Arabia; Liberation of Kuwait); Operation Northern Watch Operation Southern Watch

- Decorations: Distinguished Unit Citation (3x); Air Force Outstanding Unit Award (10x)

Commanders
- Current commander: Colonel Robert J Elwood

Insignia
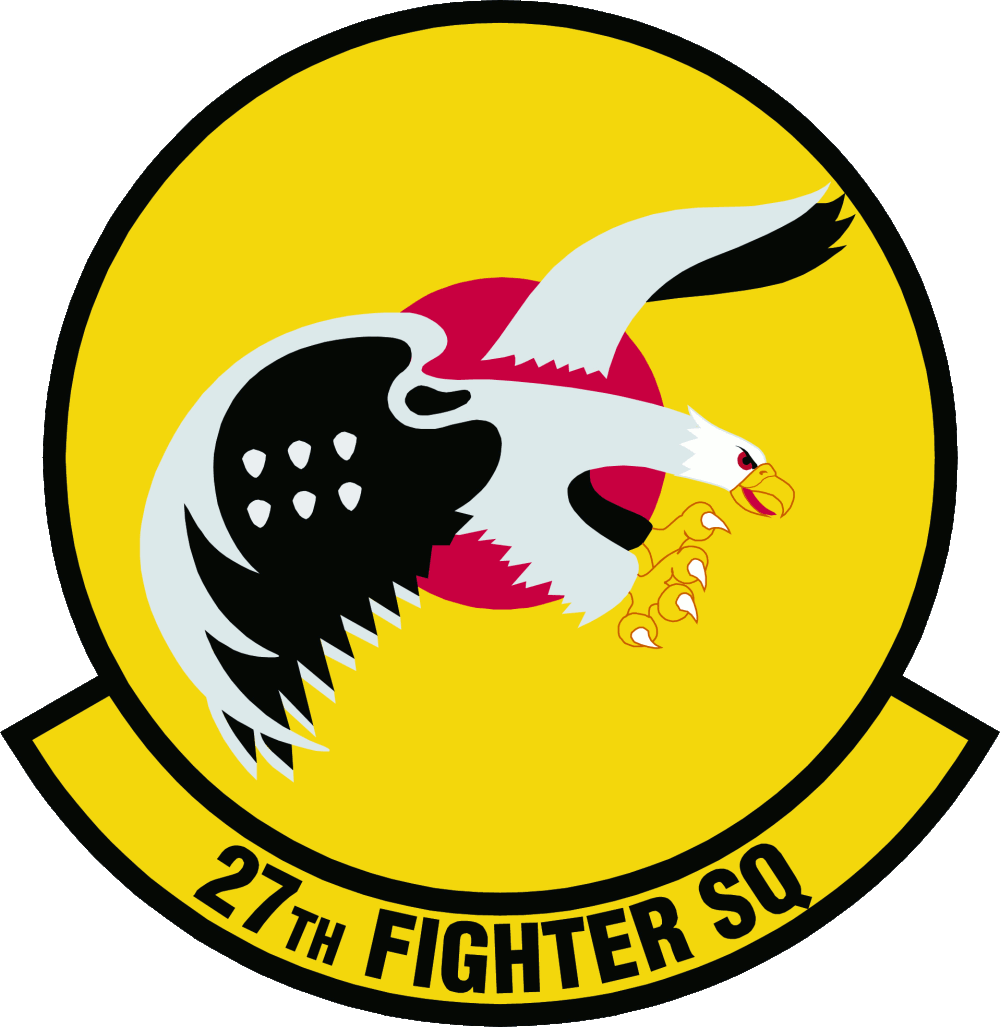
- 27th Fighter Squadron emblem (approved 17 September 1971)

The 27th Fighter Squadron is a unit of the United States Air Force 1st Operations Group located at Joint Base Langley–Eustis, Virginia. The 27th is equipped with the F-22 Raptor.

The 27th Fighter Squadron is the oldest active fighter squadron in the United States Air Force, with over 100 years of service to the nation. It was organized as the 21st (later 27th) Aero Squadron on 8 May 1917 at Kelly Field, Texas. The squadron deployed to France and fought on the Western Front during World War I as a pursuit squadron. It took part in the Champagne-Marne defensive; Aisne-Marne offensive; St. Mihiel offensive, and Meuse-Argonne offensive.

During World War II the unit served in the Mediterranean Theater of Operations (MTO) as part of Twelfth Air Force as a P-38 Lightning fighter squadron, participating in the North African and Italian campaigns. During the Cold War it was both an Air Defense Command fighter-interceptor squadron as later as part of Tactical Air Command. It was the first USAF operational squadron equipped with the F-15A Eagle in January 1976.

== Overview ==
Known as the "Fightin' Eagles" or "Black Falcons", the squadron is equipped with the F-22 Raptor, having transitioned from the McDonnell Douglas F-15 Eagle in 2005 to become the world's first operational F-22 squadron.

As one of three fighter squadrons of the 1st Fighter Wing, the 27th is tasked to provide air superiority for United States or allied forces by engaging and destroying enemy forces, equipment, defenses or installations for global deployment.

== History ==
=== World War I ===
see: 27th Aero Squadron for a complete World War I history

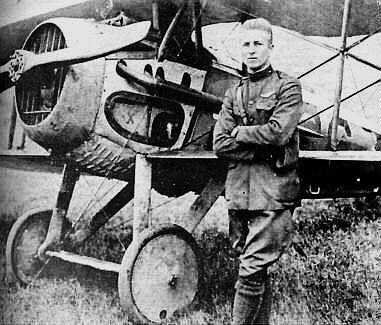
Lt. Frank Luke, Jr. with his SPAD XIII on 19 September 1918.

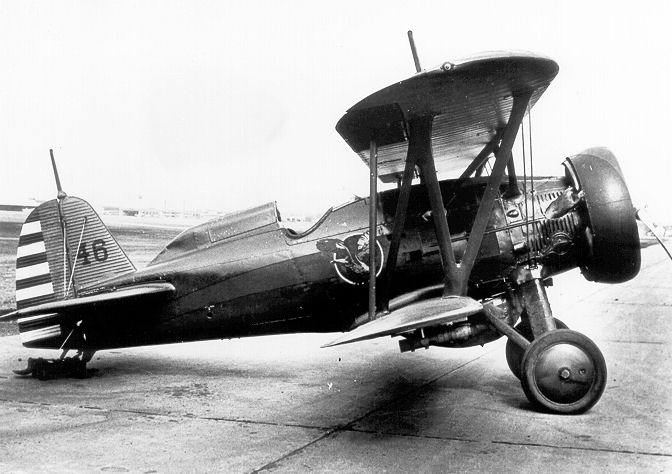
Boeing P-12E 32-46, 27th Fighter Squadron, about 1933

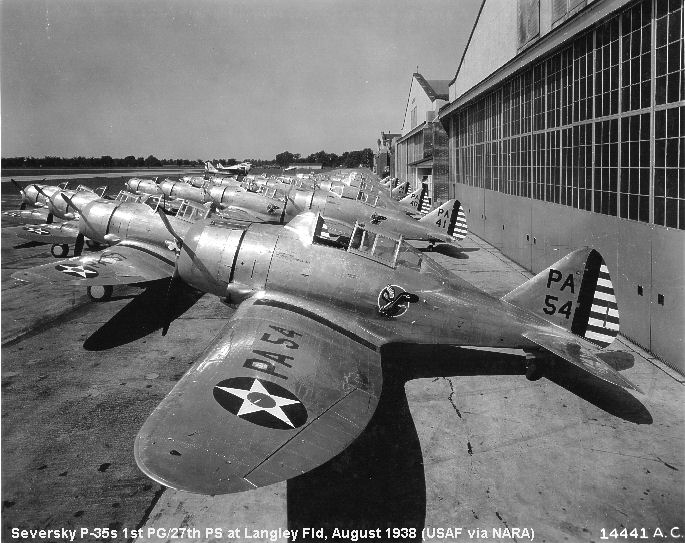
Seversky P-35s, 1938. 36-354 in foreground

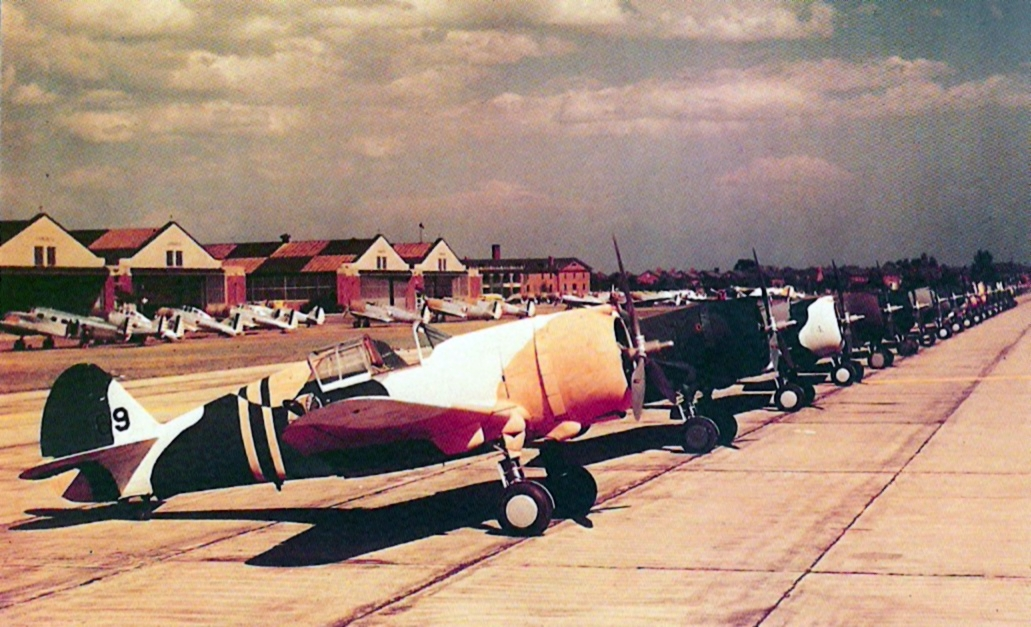
27th Pursuit Squadron P-36Cs at Wright Field, Ohio, en route to the 1939 National Air Races.

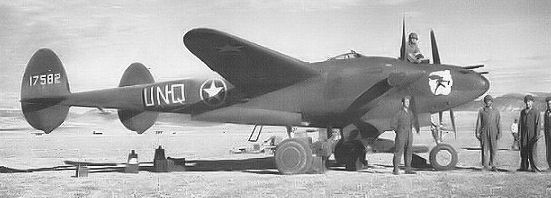
P-38F Lightning 41-7582, North Africa, 1943

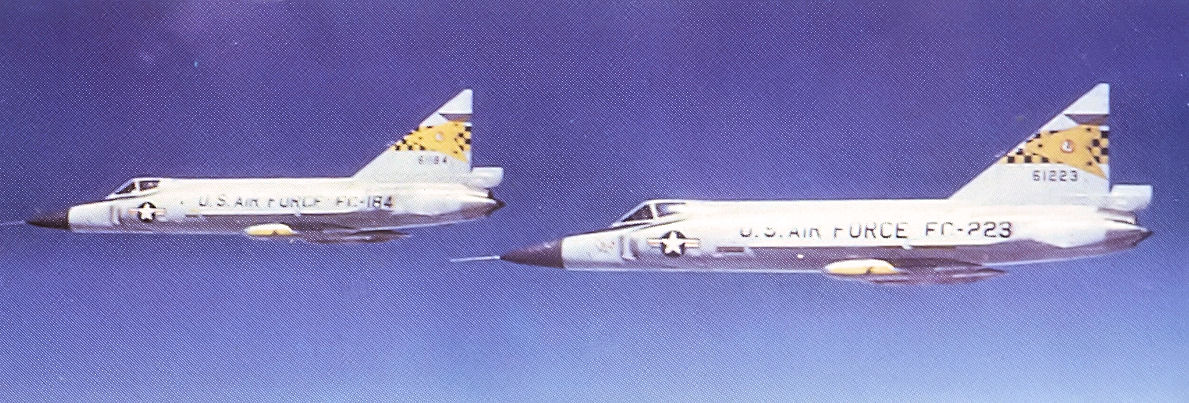
27th Fighter-Interceptor Squadron two F-102s in formation, about 1958.

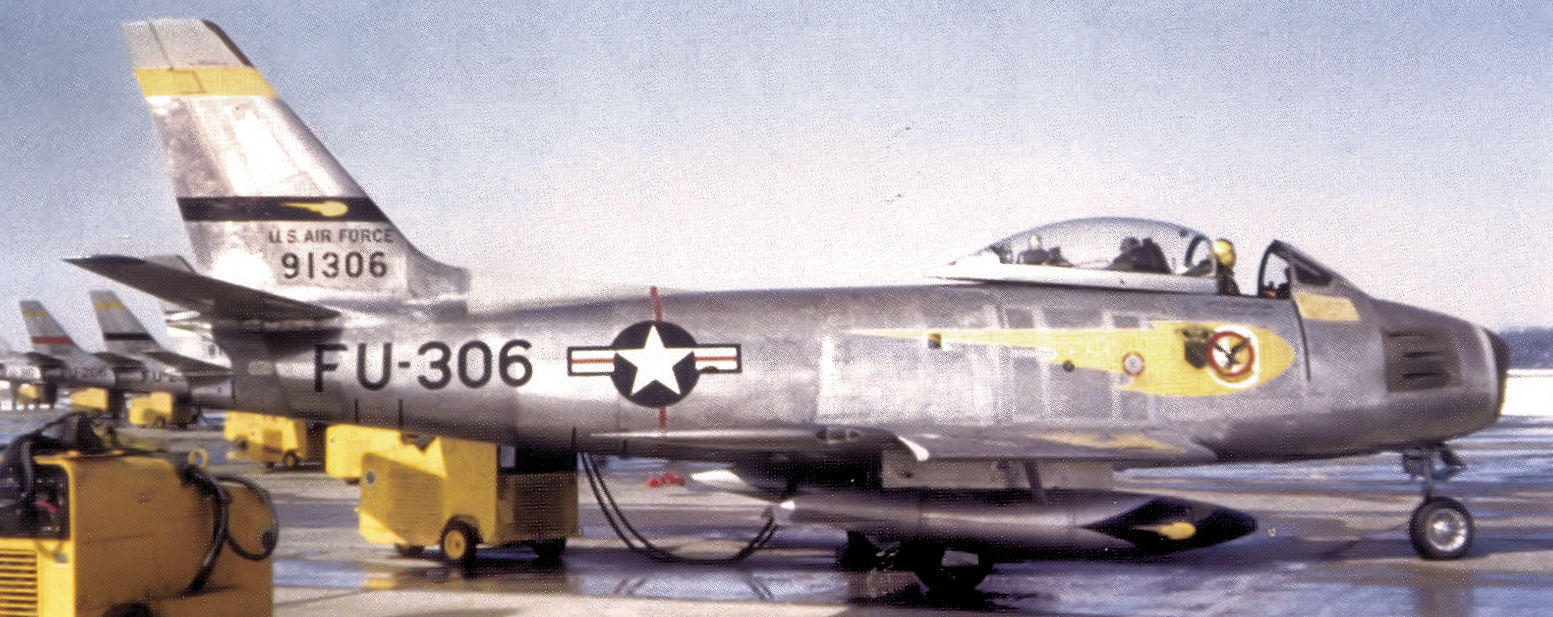
North American F-86A-5-NA Sabre 49-1306 1st Fighter Group, Griffiss AFB, New York 1951

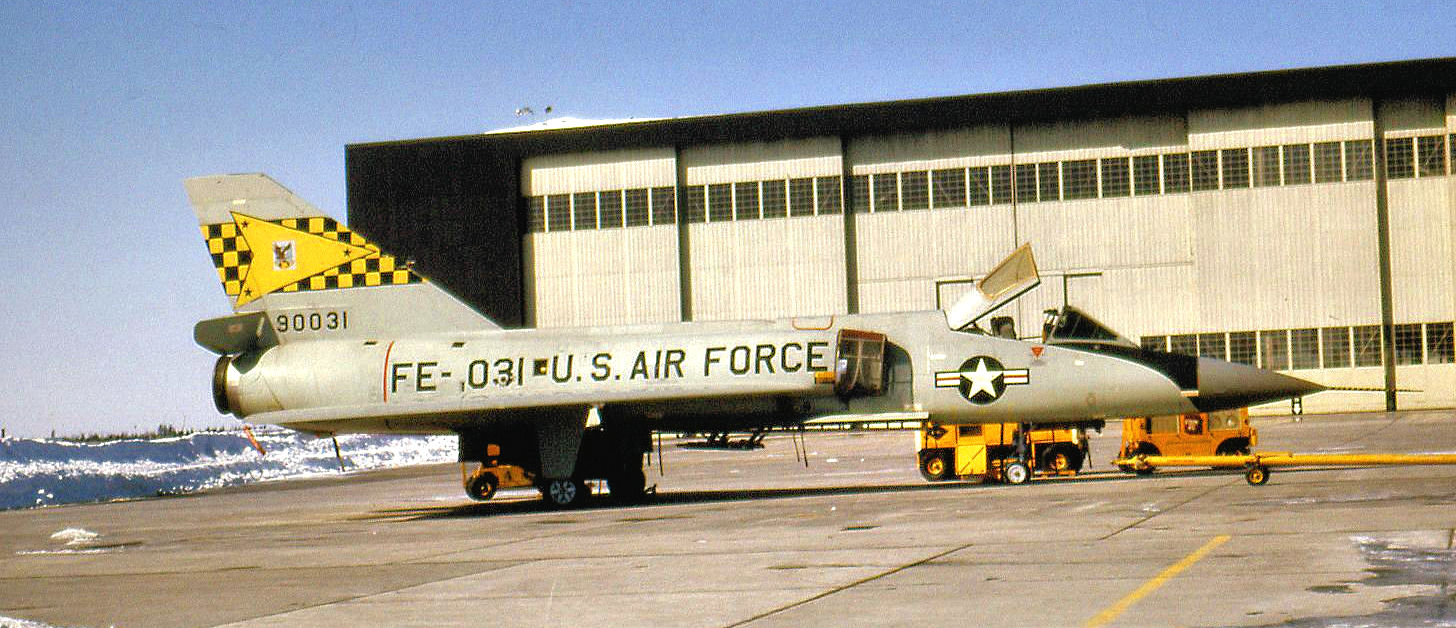
27th Fighter-Interceptor Squadron F-106 59-0031 at Loring AFB, ME

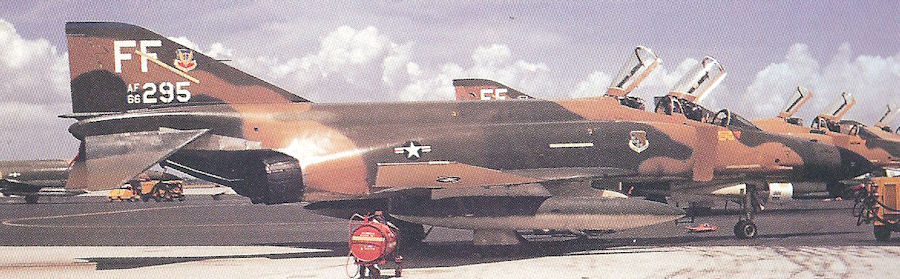
F-4E Phantoms (66-295 in foreground), 1979

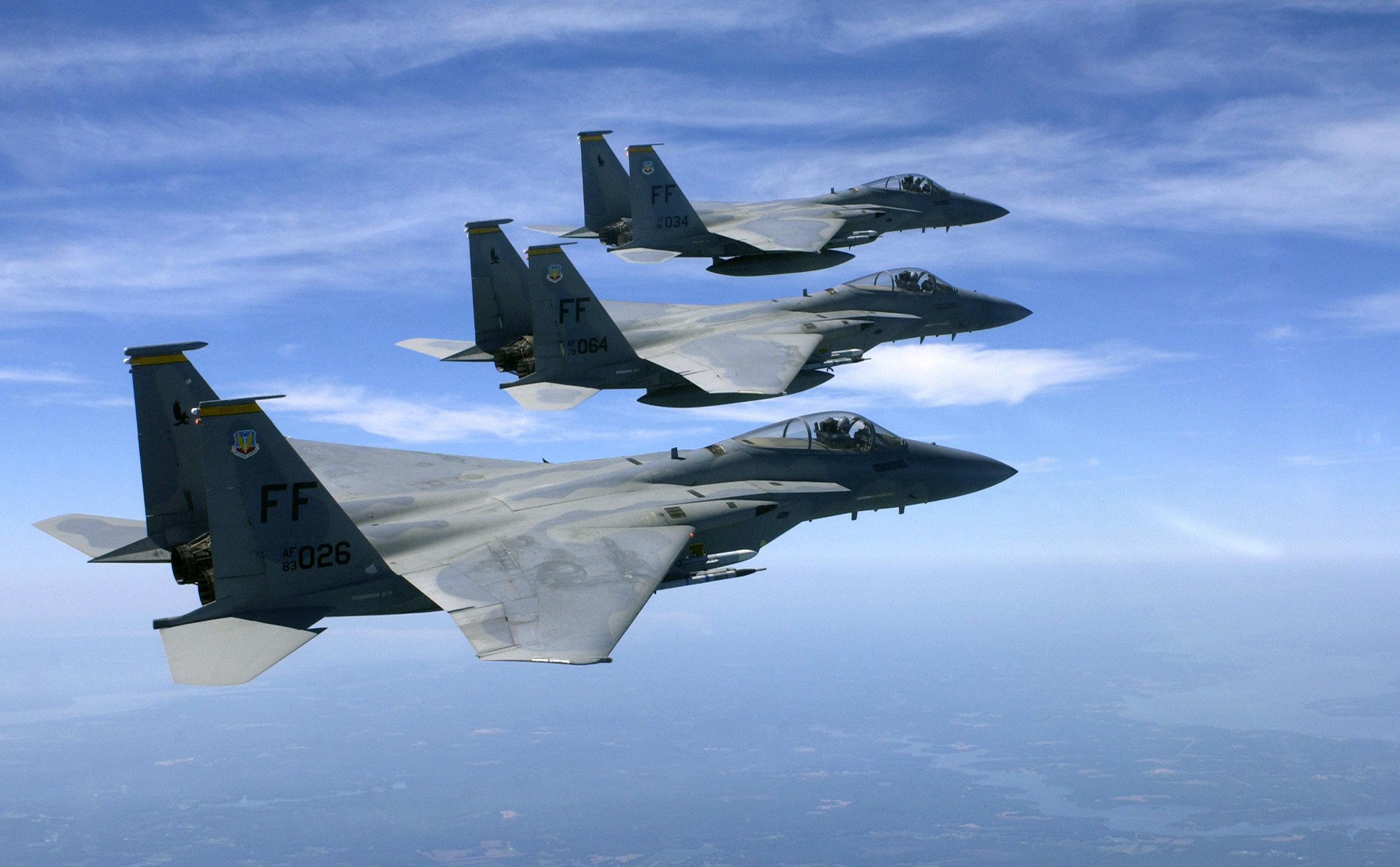
Final F-15 flight of the 27th Fighter Squadron, 2005

During World War I, the squadron was based at Toul (5 May 1918), Touquin (28 June 1918), Saints (9 July 1918) and Rembercourt (1 September 1918).

Lieutenant Frank Luke, Jr., known as the "Arizona Balloon Buster," for his daring feats against German observation balloons, was the squadron's most colorful ace. His 18 victories cost him his life, and he was awarded the Medal of Honor. Aircraft flown by the 27th during World War I include the Nieuport 28, Spad XIII and Sopwith F-1 Camel.

=== Between the wars ===
In the period between the world wars, the 27th Pursuit Squadron, re-designated 25 January 1923, was stationed primarily at Selfridge Field, Michigan, with the 1st Fighter Group. 27th Pursuit Squadron pilots participated in air races. In 1922, Lt. Donald Stace of the 27th AS won the first Mitchell Trophy Race.

Under extreme and austere conditions in the 1920s they tested the effects of cold weather on their aircraft. At times it was so cold, the engines of their P-1 Hawk aircraft would not start until steam was forced into the engines to thaw them.

While they were stationed at Selfridge Field, Mich., pilots from the 27th AS put on aerial demonstrations all over the country throughout the 1920s. One of those was at Langley Field in March 1925. A large silhouette of a battleship on the grass landing strip served as a target, which was successfully strafed and bombed for several duly impressed congressmen.

The 1930s saw more training, additional cold weather tests and more modern aircraft. They participated in several air shows throughout the country, and even though they were in the military, the 27th Pursuit Squadron delivered the mail for a while. One of the pilots in this failed experiment went on to lead Strategic Air Command, then Lt. Curtis E. LeMay.

=== World War II ===
At the beginning of the United States' involvement in World War II, the 27th Fighter Squadron, redesignated 15 May 1942, briefly served in anti-submarine duty at San Diego Naval Air Station and in air defense duty at Reykjavík, Iceland. From October 1942 until May 1945, the 27th participated in the European and Mediterranean theaters of operation, flying Lockheed P-38 Lightnings. The squadron won three Distinguished Unit Citations in Italy 25 August 1943, and 30 August 1943; and at Ploesti, Romania, 18 May 1944. The 27th Fighter Squadron was the top-scoring unit of the 1st Fighter Group in World War II, with 83 of its pilots credited with 176.5 victories.

=== Cold War ===
Following World War II, the 27th was stationed at March Field, California, flying P-80 Shooting Stars, the United States' first operational jet aircraft. Upon the unit's redesignation as the 27th Fighter Interceptor Squadron, it moved to Niagara Falls Air Force Station, New York, flying the F-86, F-89 and F-94C aircraft while stationed at Griffiss Air Force Base in Rome N.Y. until receiving the F-102 Delta Dagger in 1957. In October 1959, the 27th was transferred to Loring Air Force Base, Maine, where it assumed an air defense role flying F-106 Delta Darts in the Bangor Air Defense Sector.

On 22 October 1962, before President John F. Kennedy told Americans that missiles were in place in Cuba, the squadron dispersed one third of its force, equipped with nuclear tipped missiles to Olmsted Air Force Base at the start of the Cuban Missile Crisis. These planes returned to Loring after the crisis. The squadron continued its air defense mission until 1 July 1971 when it transferred its mission, personnel and equipment to the 83d Fighter-Interceptor Squadron

The squadron moved the same day on paper to MacDill Air Force Base, Florida and was redesignated the 27th Tactical Fighter Squadron as part of the reorganized 1st Tactical Fighter Wing, later the 1st Fighter Wing. While at MacDill, the 27th trained aircrews in the F-4E Phantom II. In June 1975, the 27th Tactical Fighter Squadron was moved to Langley Air Force Base, Virginia, becoming the first operational squadron to fly the F-15 Eagle air superiority fighter in 1976. The unit was redesignated the 27th Fighter Squadron on 1 September 1991. The 27th TFS deployed in support of Operation Desert Storm as part of the first U.S. Air Force contingent in Saudi Arabia. The squadron was integral in establishing allied air superiority during the operation.

=== Modern era ===
The 27th FS has deployed worldwide to support the 1st FW. The 27th Fighter Squadron deployed to Turkey in support of Operation Northern Watch, and to Saudi Arabia in support of Operation Southern Watch, flying F-15Cs in both operations enforcing UN sanctions against Iraq until 2003.

In 2003, the 27th Fighter Squadron was announced as the first operational squadron to fly the Raptor—a continuation of the squadron's historical legacy. The first F-22A arrived in late 2003 the squadron continues to grow as more Raptors arrive each month. The 27th Fighter Squadron today stands as a cohesive combat experienced team ready for any call to support the United States' security requirements.

==== 2013 sequestration ====
Air Combat Command officials announced a stand down and reallocation of flying hours for the rest of the fiscal year 2013 due to mandatory budget cuts. The across-the board spending cuts, called sequestration, took effect 1 March when Congress failed to agree on a deficit-reduction plan.

Squadrons either stood down on a rotating basis or kept combat ready or at a reduced readiness level called "basic mission capable" for part or all of the remaining months in fiscal 2013. This affected the 27th Fighter Squadron with a reduction of its flying hours, placing it into a basic mission capable status from 5 April – 30 September 2013.

== Lineage ==
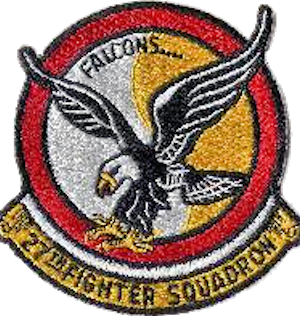
Legacy 27th Fighter-Interceptor squadron (Air Defense Command) emblem

- Organized as the 21st Aero Squadron on 15 June 1917

Redesignated 27th Aero Squadron on 23 June 1917
Redesignated 27th Aero Squadron (Pursuit) on 20 March 1918
Redesignated 27th Aero Squadron on 19 March 1919
Redesignated 27th Squadron (Pursuit) on 14 March 1921
Redesignated 27th Pursuit Squadron on 25 January 1923
Redesignated 27th Pursuit Squadron (Interceptor) on 6 December 1939
Redesignated 27th Pursuit Squadron (Fighter) on 12 March 1941
Redesignated 27th Fighter Squadron (Twin Engine) on 15 May 1942
Redesignated 27th Fighter Squadron, Two Engine on 28 February 1944
Inactivated on 16 October 1945

- Redesignated 27th Fighter Squadron, Single Engine on 5 April 1946

Redesignated 27th Fighter Squadron, Jet Propelled on 20 June 1946
Activated on 3 July 1946
Redesignated 27th Fighter Squadron, Jet on 15 June 1948
Redesignated 27th Fighter-Interceptor Squadron on 16 April 1950
Redesignated 27th Tactical Fighter Squadron on 1 July 1971
Redesignated 27th Fighter Squadron on 1 November 1991

=== Assignments ===
- Post Headquarters, Kelly Field, 8 May 1917
- Aviation Section, U.S. Signal Corps

Attached to the Royal Flying Corps for training, 18 August 1917 – 26 January 1918

- Aviation Concentration Center, 26 January – 25 February 1918
- Air Service Headquarters, AEF, 20 March 1918
- Third Aviation Instruction Center, 29 March 1918
- Air Service Headquarters, AEF, 24 April 1918 (Note: Robertson and Maurer both indicate the squadron's assignments until 1921 are unknown, except for the period it was assigned to the 1st Pursuit Group in 1918. Robertson; Maurer, Combat Squadrons, p. 138.)
- 1st Pursuit Group, May 1918
- 1st Air Depot, 12 December 1918
- Advanced Section Services of Supply, 5 February – 8 March 1919
- Eastern Department, 19 March 1919
- Central Department, 1 June 1919
- 1st Pursuit Group (later 1 Fighter Group), 22 August 1919 – 16 October 1945
- 1st Fighter Group, 3 July 1946 (attached to Eastern Air Defense Force, 15 August 1950; 103d Fighter Interceptor Group, 4 June 1951 – 6 February 1952)
- 4711th Defense Wing (later 4711 Air Defense Wing), 6 February 1952
- 32d Air Division, 1 March 1956 (attached to 14th Fighter Group)
- 4727 Air Defense Group, 8 February 1957 (attached to 14th Fighter Group until 17 February 1957)
- Bangor Air Defense Sector, 1 October 1959
- 36th Air Division, 1 April 1966
- 35th Air Division, 15 September 1969
- 21st Air Division, 19 November 1969
- 1st Tactical Fighter Wing, 1 July 1971 (attached to 1st Tactical Fighter Wing, Provisional 8 August 1990 – 8 March 1991)
- 1st Operations Group, 1 October 1991 – present

=== Stations ===
World War I and interwar years

- Kelly Field, Texas, 15 June 1917
- Toronto, Ontario, Canada, 18 August 1917

Detachments at various Canadian stations, 5 Sep – 22 Oct 1917

- Hicks Field (Camp Taliaferro Field #1), Texas, 29 October 1917
- Aviation Concentration Center, Garden City, New York, 26 Jan – 25 Feb 1918
- Tours Aerodrome, France, 20 March 1918
- Issoudun Aerodrome, France, 29 March 1918
- Epiez Aerodrome, France, 24 April 1918
- Gengault Aerodrome (Toul), France, 1 June 1918
- Touquin Aerodrome, France, 28 June 1918
- Saints Aerodrome, France, 9 July 1918
- Rembercourt Aerodrome, France, 3 September 1918

Flight operated from Verdun Aerodrome, 25 Sep 1918 – unknown

- Colombey-les-Belles Airdrome, France, 12 December 1918
- Brest, France, 5 Feb – 8 Mar 1919
- Garden City, New York, 19 March 1919
- Selfridge Field, Michigan, 28 April 1919
- Kelly Field, Texas, 31 August 1919
- Ellington Field, Texas, 1 July 1921
- Selfridge Field, Michigan, 1 July 1922

World War II

- NAS San Diego, California, c. 11 December 1941
- Los Angeles Airport, California, 29 December 1941 – 20 May 1942
- RAF Goxhill, England, 9 June 1942

Operated from Reykjavík, Iceland, 3 July – 26 August 1942

- RAF Atcham, England, 9 August 1942
- RAF High Ercall, England, 20 August 1942
- RAF Colerne, England, 12 September – 23 October 1942
- Saint-Leu Airfield, Algeria, 9 November 1942
- Tafaraoui Airfield, Algeria, 13 November 1942
- Nouvion Airfield, Algeria, 20 November 1942

Detachment operated from: Maison Blanche Airport, Algeria, 7–21 December 1942
Detachment operated from: Biskra Airfield, Algeria, 21–30 December 1942

- Biskra Airfield, Algeria, 30 December 1942
- Chateau-dun-du-Rhumel Airfield, Algeria, 18 February 1943
- Mateur Airfield, Tunisia, 28 June 1943

Detachment operated from: Dittaino, Sicily, Italy, 6–18 September 1943
Detachment operated from: Gambut, Libya, 5–13 October 1943

- Djedeida Airfield, Tunisia, 1 November 1943
- Monserrato, Sardinia, Italy, 29 November 1943
- Gioia del Colle Airfield, Italy, 9 December 1943
- Salsola Airfield, Italy, 8 January 1944

Detachment operated from: Aghione, Corsica, France, 11–21 August 1944
Detachment operated from: Vincenzo Airfield, Italy, 10 January – 21 February 1945

- Lesina Airfield, Italy, 16 March 1945
- Marcianise, Italy, 26 September – 16 October 1945

United States Air Force

- March Field (later March Air Force Base), California, 3 July 1946
- George Air Force Base, California, 14 July 1950
- Griffiss Air Force Base, New York, 15 August 1950
- Loring Air Force Base, Maine, 1 October 1959 – 1 July 1971
- MacDill Air Force Base, Florida, 1 July 1971
- Langley Air Force Base, Virginia, 30 June 1975–present

Operated from King Abdul Aziz Air Base, Saudi Arabia, 8 August 1990 – 8 March 1991

=== Aircraft ===
- JN-4, 1917–1918
- Nieuport 28, 1918
- Sopwith F-1 Camel, 1918
- Spad XIII, 1918–1922
- SE-5, 1919–1922
- DH-4, 1919–1925
- Fokker D.VII, 1921
- MB-3, 1922–1925
- PW-8, 1924–1926
- P-1 Hawk, 1925–1931
- P-6 Hawk, 1928–1929
- Boeing P-12, 1930–1934
- Berliner-Joyce P-16, 1932
- P-26 Peashooter, 1934–1938
- PB-2, 1936–1937
- Seversky P-35, 1938–1941
- P-36, 1939
- YP-43 Lancer, 1939–1941
- C-40 Electra, 1939–1941
- P-38, 1941–1945
- P-80, 1946–1949
- F-86A Sabre, 1949–1954
- F-94C Starfire, 1954–1957
- F-102 Delta Dagger, 1957–1959
- F-106 Delta Dart, 1959–1971
- F-4 Phantom II, 1971–1975
- F-15 Eagle, 1975–2005
- F-22 Raptor, 2005–present

== See also ==
- Donald Hudson
- Frank Luke
- Jerry Cox Vasconcells
- John MacArthur
- Joseph Frank Wehner
- List of American aero squadrons
