= 644th Bomb Squadron =

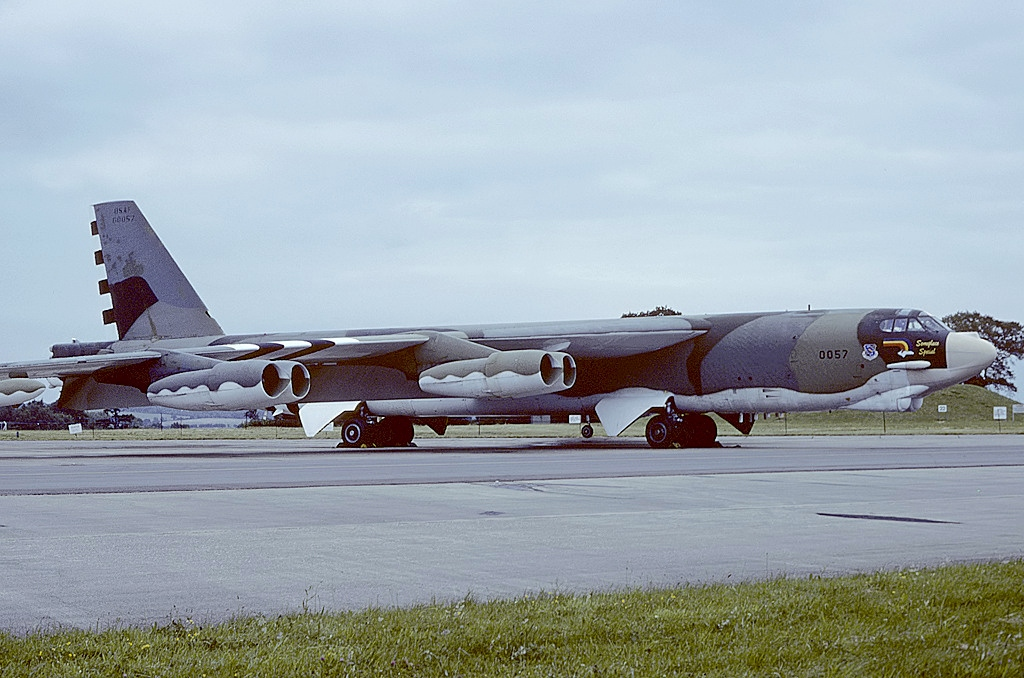
- Squadron B-52H Stratofortress (Note: Aircraft is Boeing B-52H-155-BW Stratofortress, serial 60-0057, Someplace Special (Nemesis during Operation Allied Force). Baugher, Joe (14 April 2023). "1960 USAF Serial Numbers". Joe Baugher. Taken at RAF Greenham Common in 1982. The plane's markings are patterned after those used by the squadron on D-Day.)
- Active: 1943-1945; 1958–1959; 1962–1994
- Country: United States
- Branch: United States Air Force
- Role: Heavy bomber
- Engagements: European Theater of Operations
- Decorations: Distinguished Unit Citation; Air Force Outstanding Unit Award

Insignia
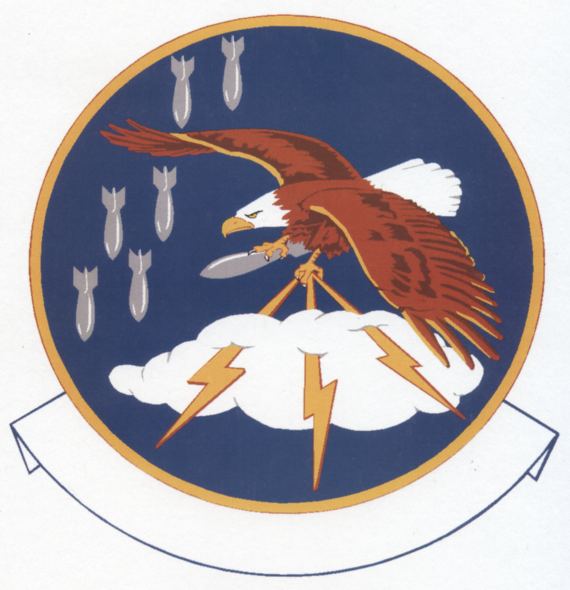
- 644th Bomb Squadron emblem (SAC era)

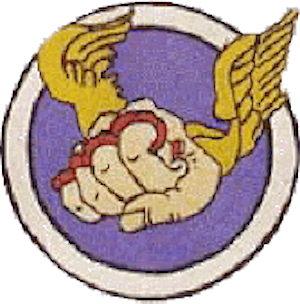
- 644th Bombardment Squadron emblem (Note: Approved 21 December 1943. Description: Over and through an ultramarine blue disc, border white, edged back, a right fist proper, winged gold, doubled about red brass knuckles.)
- World War II 644th Bombardment Squadron fuselage code: 5D

The 644th Bomb Squadron is an inactive United States Air Force unit. It was last assigned to the 410th Bombardment Wing at K. I. Sawyer Air Force Base, Michigan, where it was inactivated on 21 November 1994.

First activated as the 644th Bombardment Squadron during World War II, the squadron moved to the European Theater of Operations in the spring of 1944. It flew air support and air interdiction missions with Douglas A-20 Havoc bombers, first from England, then from Advanced Landing Grounds on the European continent. It received a Distinguished Unit Citation for missions flown against German targets during the Battle of the Bulge. In February 1945, the unit began converting to the Douglas A-26 Invader, but the war ended before it flew any combat missions with its new aircraft.

The squadron was redesignated the 644th Strategic Missile Squadron and activated in 1959 as a SM-75 Thor training unit, training Royal Air Force missile crews. It was inactivated later that year. The squadron returned to its bombardment designation in 1963, when it was activated to replace a Boeing B-52H Stratofortress squadron at K. I. Sawyer Air Force Base. The squadron stood alert with its planes there until the end of the Cold War. It deployed crewmembers during the Vietnam War and crews and airplanes during Desert Storm, although the squadron itself remained at its home station.

== History ==
=== World War II ===
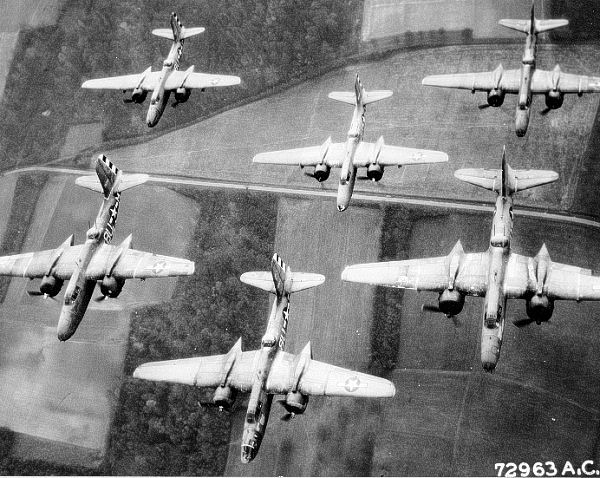
410th Bombardment Group A-20s

The squadron was first activated as the 644th Bombardment Squadron at Will Rogers Field on 1 July 1943 as one of the four original squadrons of the 410th Bombardment Group and equipped and trained with Douglas A-20 Havoc light bombers. It completed training and left the United States for the European Theater of Operations in March 1944.

The squadron arrived at its first overseas station, RAF Birch in April 1944, but soon moved to RAF Gosfield. The squadron flew its first combat mission the following month. It helped to prepare for Operation Overlord, the invasion of Normandy, by assaulting coastal defenses, airfields, and V-1 flying bomb and V-2 rocket sites in France, and marshalling yards in France and Belgium. It supported the landings in June by bombing artillery positions and railway choke points. Assisted ground forces participating in Operation Cobra, the breakthrough at St Lo in July, and supported ground forces at Caen and Brest, France through September by attacking bridges, vehicles, fuel and ammunition dumps, and rail lines.

The 644th moved to its first base in France in September, and from Coulommiers Airfield struck defended villages, railroad bridges and overpasses, marshalling yards, military camps, and communications centers to support the Allied assault on the Siegfried Line through the middle of December. In December, the unit participated in the Battle of the Bulge by striking marshalling yards, railheads, bridges, and vehicles in the battle area through January 1945. The squadron's bombing of targets in the Ardennes, when it made many attacks on German lines of communications, from 23 to 25 December 1944, earned it a Distinguished Unit Citation.

The squadron began training in January 1945 for night missions, while continuing its daylight operations. It replaced its A-20G and A-20H aircraft with nose-mounted guns with black A-20J and A-20Ks with navigator positions for night operations. These operations were aided by Martin B-26 Marauder flare ships to illuminate the area, and Douglas A-26 Invaders to mark targets with special bombs that burned with various colors. Successful night missions were flown in February, but the swift advances of Allied forces and need for daytime support resulted in a return to daylight operations.

The 644th continued to fly ground support and air interdiction missions, aiding the Allied drive across the Rhine and into Germany from February through April 1945. The squadron converted to the Douglas A-26 Invader in 1945, but did not fly combat missions with its new bomber. After V-E Day, the squadron left Europe in June 1945 and reassembled at Seymour Johnson Field, North Carolina in August. It was inactivated at Myrtle Beach Army Air Field in November 1945.

=== Missile training ===
The squadron was redesignated the 644th Strategic Missile Squadron and activated at Vandenberg Air Force Base, California in January 1959 as a missile training squadron. The squadron was assigned to the 704th Strategic Missile Wing and was intended to train Royal Air Force personnel in the operation and launching of the SM-75 Thor Intermediate Range Ballistic Missile (IRBM). Anticipating the inactivation of the 704th Wing in July, the squadron was attached to the 1st Missile Division on 6 April 1969. However, although Thors were provided to NATO allies, no USAF units were equipped with them, when the Army's Jupiter missile was selected as the IRBM for US forces, and the squadron was inactivated on 15 December 1959 without being manned.

=== Strategic bomber operations ===
In the late 1950s, Strategic Air Command (SAC) began to disperse its Boeing B-52 Stratofortress bombers over a larger number of bases, thus making it more difficult for the Soviet Union to knock out the entire fleet with a surprise first strike. SAC bases with large concentrations of bombers made attractive targets. SAC's response was to break up its wings and scatter their aircraft over a larger number of bases. As part of this program, it established the 4042d Strategic Wing at the new K. I. Sawyer Air Force Base, Michigan in August 1958. By 1961, the base was ready to accept the B-52s of the 526th Bombardment Squadron, which moved to K.I. Sawyer from Homestead Air Force Base, Florida. However, the 4042d Wing was a Major Command controlled (MAJCON) wing, which could not carry a permanent history or lineage, and SAC wanted to replace it with a permanent unit. The 410th Bombardment Wing was activated to replace the 4042d Wing in February 1963, The 644th, once again a bombardment squadron, took over the mission, personnel and equipment of the 526th, which was simultaneously inactivated. While this action was almost tantamount to redesignation, it was not an official redesignation.

One half of the squadron's aircraft were maintained on fifteen minute alert, fully fueled and ready for combat to reduce vulnerability to a Soviet missile strike. in addition, the squadron periodically flew Operation Chrome Dome missions for "airborne alert training." The squadron trained for strategic bombardment to meet SAC commitments. Although the squadron did not deploy to support Operation Arc Light and Operation Linebacker, from 1968 to the end of the Vietnam War squadron crews deployed to the Pacific, where they flew B-52s of other units on combat missions.

In 1980, two 644th Bomb Squadron crews (S-21 and S-31) received the Mackay Trophy for "executing a nonstop, around-the-world mission with the immediate objective of locating and photographing elements of the Soviet Navy operating in the Persian Gulf. With the end of the Cold War, its bombers were taken off alert. The squadron was inactivated in November 1994, as the 410th Bomb Wing became non-operational in preparation for the closure of K.I. Sawyer in 1995.

== Lineage ==
- Constituted as the 644th Bombardment Squadron (Light) on 16 June 1943

Activated on 1 July 1943
Redesignated 644th Bombardment Squadron, Light in 1944
Inactivated on 7 November 1945

- Redesignated 644th Strategic Missile Squadron (IRBM-Thor) on 1 December 1958

Activated on 15 January 1959
Inactivated on 1 November 1959

- Redesignated 644th Bombardment Squadron, Heavy and activated on 15 Nov 1962 (not organized)

Organized on 1 February 1963
Redesignated 644th Bomb Squadron on 1 September 1991
Inactivated on 21 November 1994

=== Assignments ===
- 410th Bombardment Group, 1 July 1943 – 7 November 1945
- 704th Strategic Missile Wing, 15 January 1959
- 1st Missile Division, 1 July–1 November 1959
- Strategic Air Command, 15 November 1962 (not organized)
- 410th Bombardment Wing, 1 February 1963
- 410th Operations Group, 1 September 1991 – 21 November 1994

=== Stations ===
- Will Rogers Field, Oklahoma, 1 July 1943
- Muskogee Army Air Field, Oklahoma, 4 October 1943
- Laurel Army Air Field, Mississippi, 10 January 1944
- Lakeland Army Air Field, Florida, 8 February–13 March 1944
- RAF Birch (AAF-149), England, 4 April 1944
- RAF Gosfield (AAF-154), England, 16 April 1944
- Coulommiers Airfield (A-58), France, 27 September 1944
- Juvincourt Airfield (A-68), France, 9 February 1945
- Beaumont sur Oise Airfield (A-60), France, 22 May–25 June 1945
- Seymour Johnson Field, North Carolina, c. 24 August 1945
- Myrtle Beach Army Air Field, South Carolina, 5 October–7 November 1945
- Vandenberg Air Force Base, California, 15 January–1 November 1959
- K. I. Sawyer Air Force Base, Michigan 1 February 1963 – 21 November 1994

=== Aircraft and missiles ===
- Douglas A-20 Havoc, 1944–1945
- Douglas A-26 Invader, 1945
- PGM-17 Thor, 1959
- Boeing B-52H Stratofortress, 1963–1994

=== Awards and campaigns ===
Award streamer	Award	Dates	Notes
	Distinguished Unit Citation	23 December 1944-25 December 1944	Germany, 644th Bombardment Squadron
	Air Force Outstanding Unit Award	1 February 1963-31 March 1963	644th Bombardment Squadron

Campaign Streamer	Campaign	Dates	Notes
	Air Offensive, Europe	4 April 1944 – 5 June 1944	644th Bombardment Squadron
	Normandy	6 June 1944 – 24 July 1944	644th Bombardment Squadron
	Northern France	25 July 1944 – 14 September 1944	644th Bombardment Squadron
	Rhineland	15 September 1944 – 21 March 1945	644th Bombardment Squadron
	Ardennes-Alsace	16 December 1944 – 25 January 1945	644th Bombardment Squadron
	Central Europe	22 March 1944 – 21 May 1945	644th Bombardment Squadron

== See also ==
- List of B-52 Units of the United States Air Force
- List of United States Air Force missile squadrons
