= 645th Bombardment Squadron =

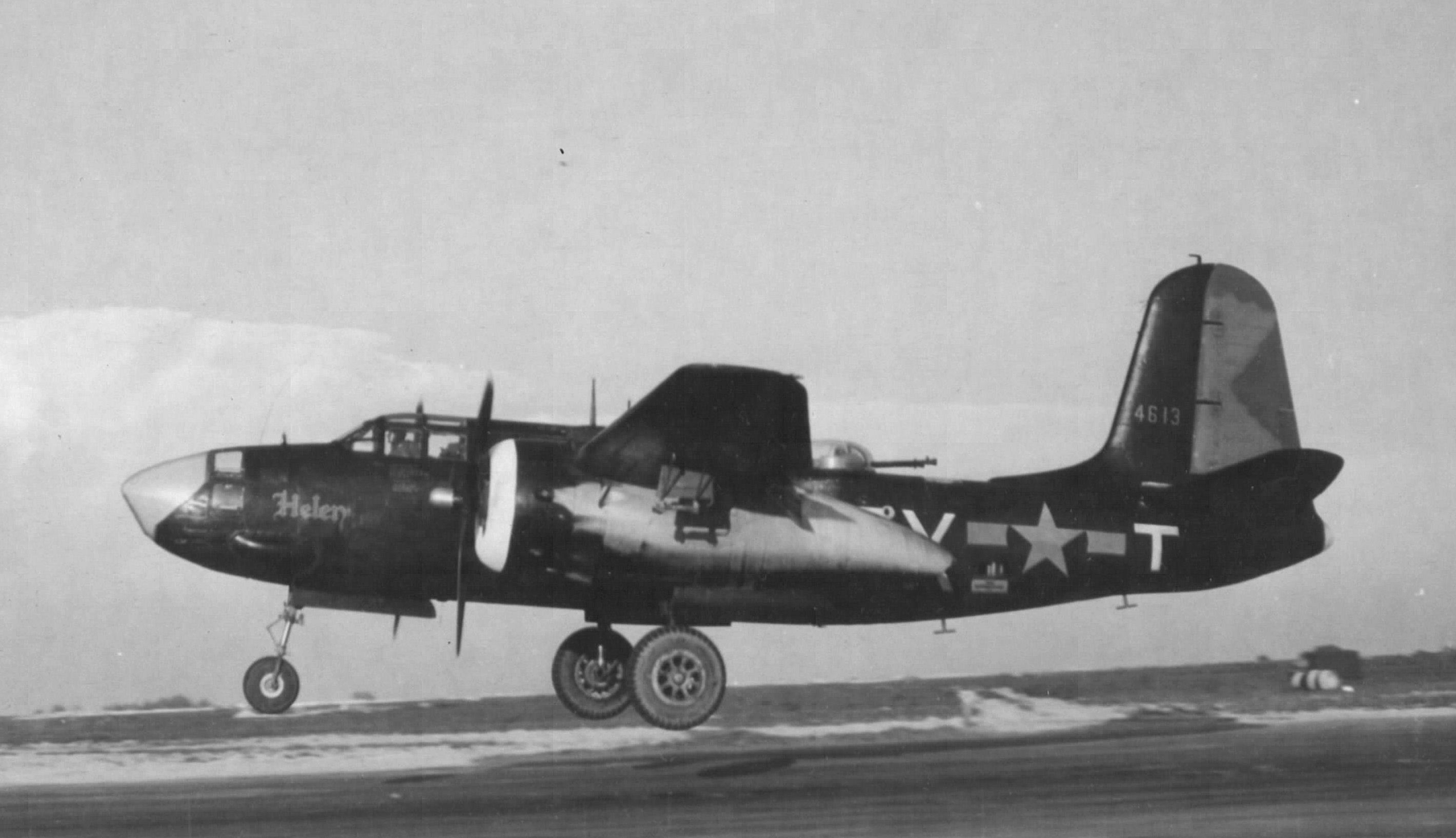
- A-20K Havoc of the 645th Squadron (Note: Aircraft is Douglas A-20K-15-DO Havoc, serial 44-613, Helen, fuselage code 7X-T.)
- Active: 1943-1945
- Country: United States
- Branch: United States Air Force
- Role: light bomber
- Engagements: European Theater of Operations
- Decorations: Distinguished Unit Citation
- Battle honours: +

Insignia
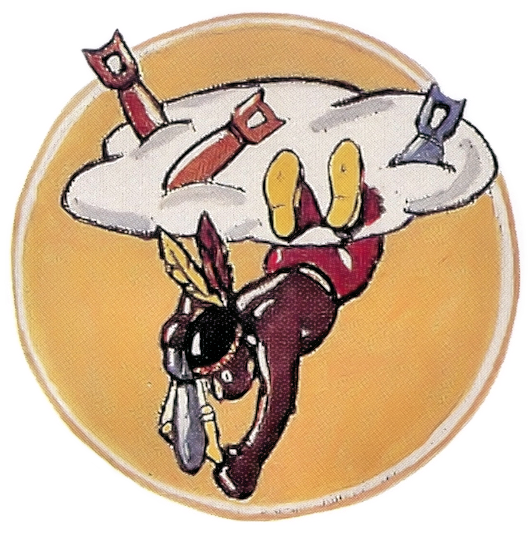
- 645th Bombardment Squadron emblem (Note: Approved 29 December 1943. Description: On a light grayed yellow orange disc, thin border of the same [color] piped white, a caricatured Indian warrior proper, wearing light red trousers, yellow moccasins, red, yellow, and blue head band with one red and one yellow feather, hanging by his heels from a large white cloud formation in chief, and shooting a blue violet aerial bomb toward the base with yellow beanshooter; cloud formation supporting reserve stock of aerial bombs, one red violet, one orange, and one blue violet.)
- Fuselage code: 7X

The 645th Bombardment Squadron is a former United States Army Air Forces unit, activated during World War II. The squadron moved to the European Theater of Operations in the spring of 1944. It flew air support and air interdiction missions with Douglas A-20 Havoc bombers, first from England, then from Advanced Landing Grounds on the European continent. It received a Distinguished Unit Citation for missions flown against German targets during the Battle of the Bulge. In February 1945, the unit began converting to the Douglas A-26 Invader, but the war ended before it flew any combat missions with its new aircraft. It returned to the United States in the summer of 1945 and was inactivated at Myrtle Beach Army Air Field, South Carolina on 7 November 1945.

== History ==
The squadron was activated at Will Rogers Field on 1 July 1943 as one of the four original squadrons of the 410th Bombardment Group and equipped and trained with Douglas A-20 Havoc light bombers. It completed training and left the United States for the European Theater of Operations in March 1944.

The squadron arrived at its first overseas station, RAF Birch in April 1944, but soon moved to RAF Gosfield. The squadron flew its first combat mission the following month. It helped to prepare for Operation Overlord, the invasion of Normandy, by assaulting coastal defenses, airfields, and V-1 flying bomb and V-2 rocket sites in France, and marshalling yards in France and Belgium. It supported the landings in June by bombing artillery positions and railway choke points. It assisted ground forces participating in Operation Cobra, the breakthrough at St Lo in July, and supported ground forces at Caen and Brest, France through September by attacking bridges, vehicles, fuel and ammunition dumps, and rail lines.

The 645th moved to its first base in France in September, and from Coulommiers Airfield struck defended villages, railroad bridges and overpasses, marshalling yards, military camps, and communications centers to support the Allied assault on the Siegfried Line through the middle of December. In December, the unit participated in the Battle of the Bulge by striking marshalling yards, railheads, bridges, and vehicles in the battle area through January 1945. The squadron's bombing of targets in the Ardennes, when it made many attacks on German lines of communications, from 23 to 25 December 1944, earned it a Distinguished Unit Citation.

The squadron began training in January 1945 for night missions, while continuing its daylight operations. It replaced its A-20G and A-20H aircraft with nose-mounted guns with black A-20J and A-20Ks with navigator positions for night operations. These operations were aided by Martin B-26 Marauder flare ships to illuminate the area, and Douglas A-26 Invaders to mark targets with special bombs that burned with various colors. Successful night missions were flown in February, but the swift advances of Allied forces and need for daytime support resulted in a return to daylight operations.

The 645th continued to fly ground support and air interdiction missions, aiding the Allied drive across the Rhine and into Germany from February through April 1945. The squadron converted to the Douglas A-26 Invader in 1945, but did not fly combat missions with its new bomber. After V-E Day, the squadron left Europe in June 1945 and reassembled at Seymour Johnson Field, North Carolina in August. It was inactivated at Myrtle Beach Army Air Field in November 1945.

== Lineage ==
- Constituted as the 645th Bombardment Squadron (Light) on 16 June 1943

Activated on 1 July 1943
Redesignated 645th Bombardment Squadron, Light in 1944
Inactivated on 7 November 1945

=== Assignments ===
- 410th Bombardment Group, 1 July 1943 – 7 November 1945

=== Stations ===
- Will Rogers Field, Oklahoma, 1 July 1943
- Muskogee Army Air Field, Oklahoma, 4 October 1943
- Laurel Army Air Field, Mississippi, 9 January 1944
- Lakeland Army Air Field, Florida, 8 February–13 March 1944 (Note: Maurer gives date the squadron left Lakeland as 31 March 1944, but this appears to be a typographical error, since all other units of the 410th Group are listed as leaving on 13 March.)
- RAF Birch (AAF-149), England, 4 April 1944
- RAF Gosfield (AAF-154), England, 16 April 1944
- Coulommiers Airfield (A-58), France, 28 September 1944
- Juvincourt Airfield (A-68), France, 9 February 1945
- Beaumont sur Oise Airfield (A-60), France, 22 May–25 June 1945
- Seymour Johnson Field, North Carolina, c. 24 August 1945
- Myrtle Beach Army Air Field, South Carolina, 5 October–7 November 1945

=== Aircraft ===
- Douglas A-20 Havoc, 1944–1945
- Douglas A-26 Invader, 1945

=== Awards and campaigns ===
Award streamer	Award	Dates	Notes
	Distinguished Unit Citation	23 December 1944-25 December 1944	Germany

Campaign Streamer	Campaign	Dates	Notes
	Air Offensive, Europe	4 April 1944 – 5 June 1944	
	Normandy	6 June 1944 – 24 July 1944	
	Northern France	25 July 1944 – 14 September 1944	
	Rhineland	15 September 1944 – 21 March 1945	
	Ardennes-Alsace	16 December 1944 – 25 January 1945	
	Central Europe	22 March 1944 – 21 May 1945	
