= 410th Air Expeditionary Wing =

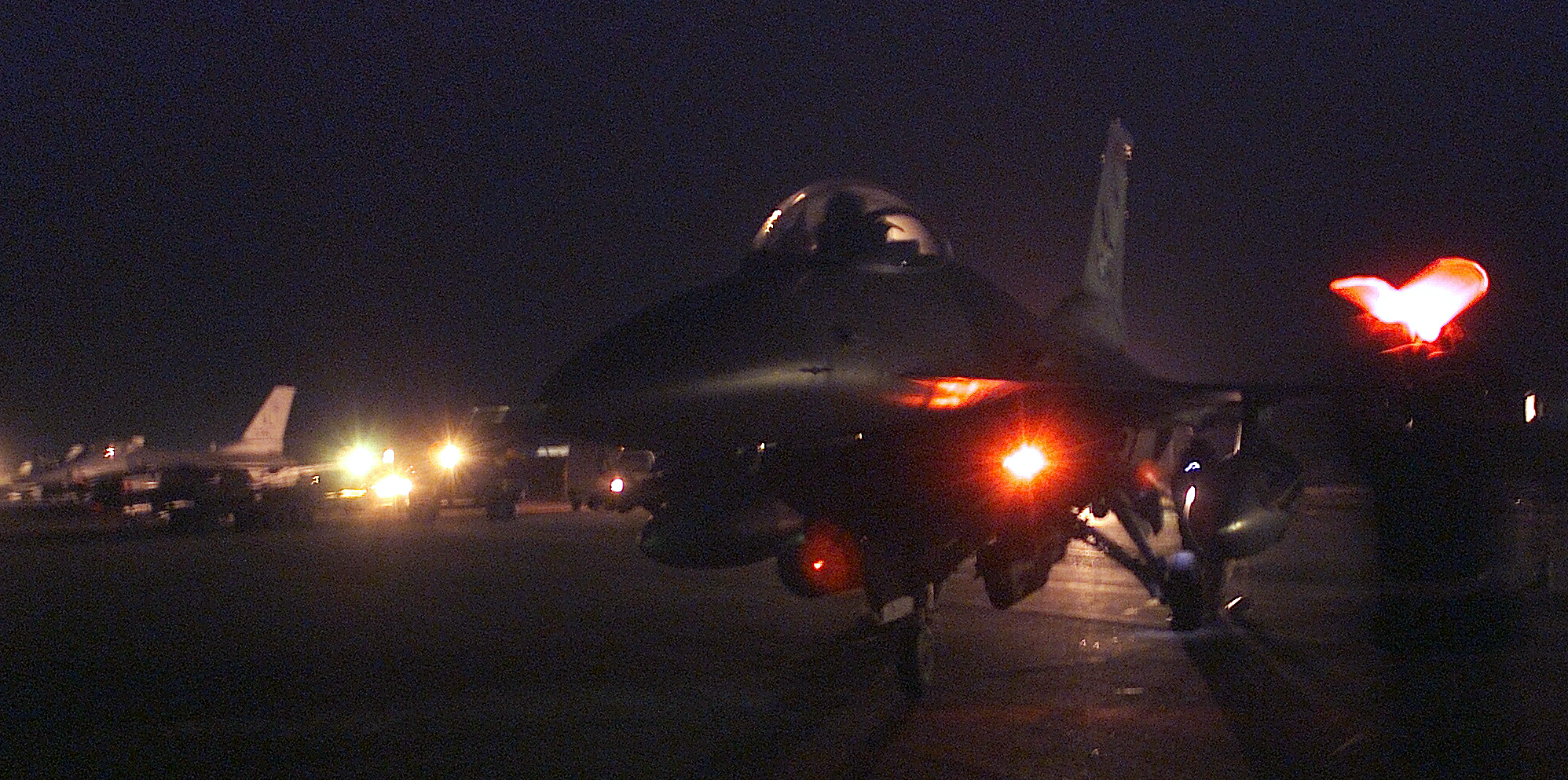
- F-16 Fighting Falcons from the 410th Air Expeditionary Wing taxi in after a long reconnaissance mission at an airbase in Jordan
- Active: 1943–1945, 1962–1995, 2003–present
- Country: United States of America
- Branch: United States Air Force
- Type: Air Expeditionary
- Role: Combat Support
- Decorations: Distinguished Unit Citation

Insignia
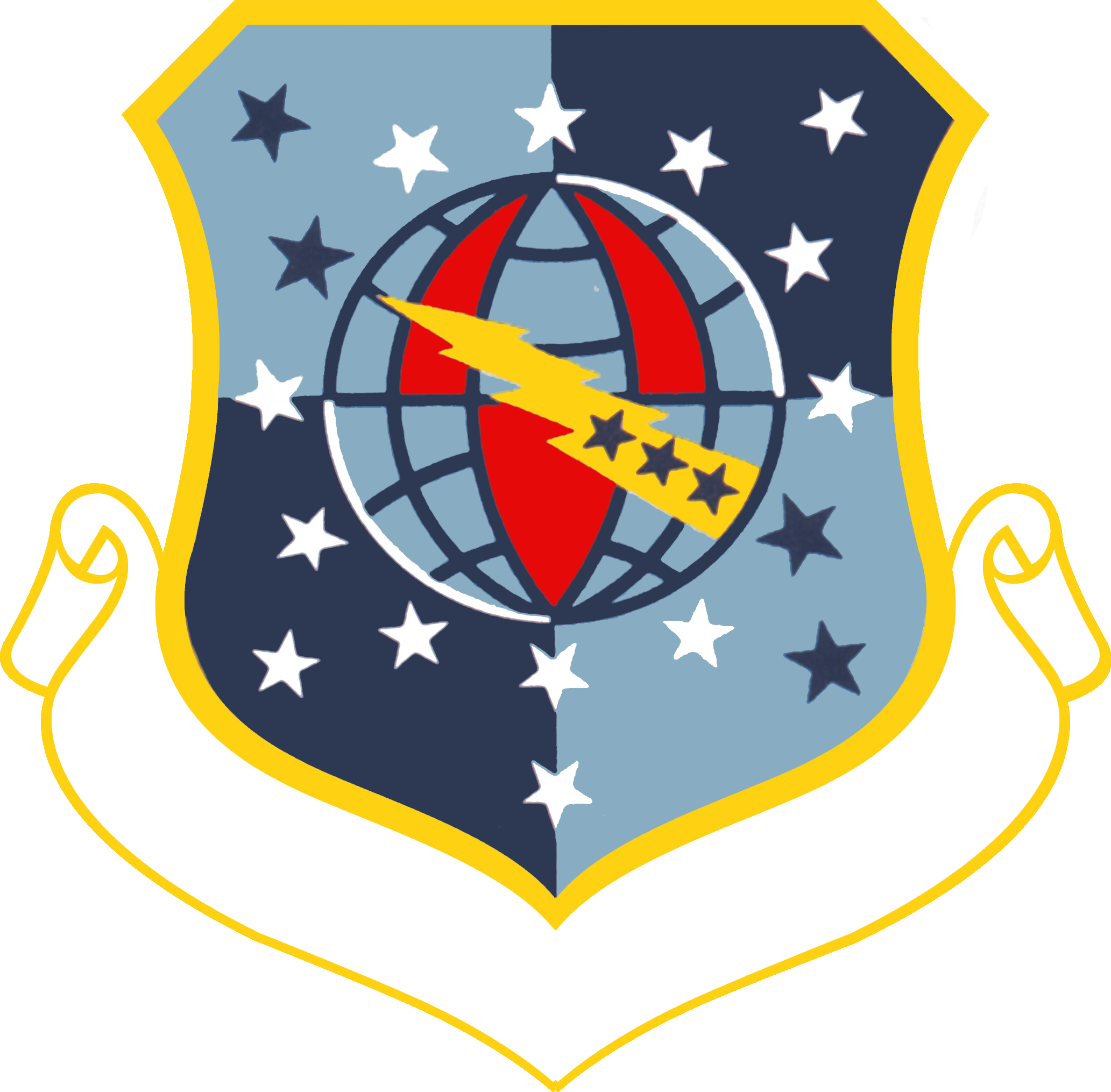
- 410th Bombardment Wing emblem (approved 17 July 1964)
- World War II Fuselage Codes: 644th Bombardment Squadron 5D; 645th Bombardment Squadron 7X; 646th Bombardment Squadron 8U; 647th Bombardment Squadron 6Q

The United States Air Force's 410th Air Expeditionary Wing (410 AEW) is a provisional United States Air Force unit assigned to Air Combat Command (ACC) It may be activated or inactivated at any time.

The unit was known to be active during the 2003 invasion of Iraq and in Afghanistan as part of Operation Enduring Freedom.

The wing began as the 410th Bombardment Group, a Douglas A-20 Havoc light bombardment group assigned to Ninth Air Force in Western Europe. The unit helped provide teeth to the IX Bomber Command bombing efforts. It earned the title of the world's best bomb unit for combat accuracy and was the first unit trained in both day and night tactics. The 410th was awarded a Distinguished Unit Citation for its actions during the Battle of the Bulge for the effectiveness of its bombing, 23–25 December 1944, when the group made numerous attacks on German lines of communications. It returned to the United States after the end of the war in Europe, inactivated on 7 November 1945.

The group's heritage was continued in 1963 when the 410th Bombardment Wing was activated as a component of Strategic Air Command's deterrent force during the Cold War, as a strategic bombardment wing. It was inactivated with the closure of K. I. Sawyer AFB, Michigan in the first round of Base Realignment and Closure reductions in September 1995.

== History ==
=== World War II ===
- Media related to 410th Bombardment Group (United States Army Air Forces) at Wikimedia Commons

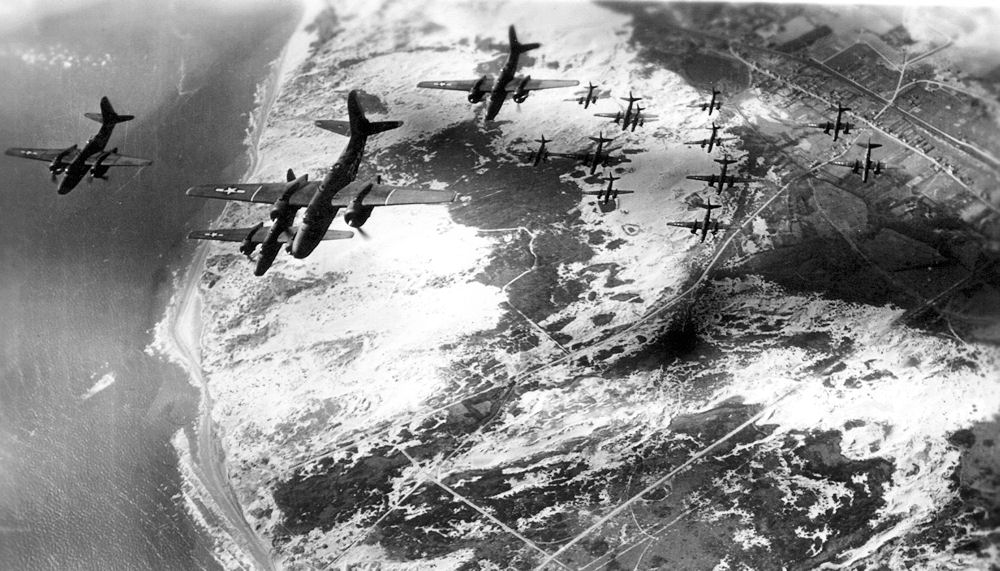
Formation of A-20 Havocs of the 410th Bombardment Group

The wing was activated as the 410th Bombardment Group, a Third Air Force Operational Training Unit for A-20 Havoc light bombers. It moved to England, March— April 1944, and was assigned to Ninth Air Force.

The 410th entered combat in May 1944 and helped to prepare for the invasion of Normandy by assaulting coastal defenses, airfields, and V-weapon sites in France, and marshalling yards in France and Belgium. It supported the D-Day invasion in June by bombing gun positions and railway choke points. It also assisted ground forces at Caen and St Lo in July and at Brest in August and September by attacking bridges, vehicles, fuel and ammunition dumps, and rail lines.

The group moved to France in September, and through mid-December struck defended villages, railroad bridges and overpasses, marshalling yards, military camps, and communications centers to support the Allied assault on the Siegfried Line. It participated in the Battle of the Bulge, December 1944 – January 1945, by pounding marshalling yards, railheads, bridges, and vehicles in the battle area.

The group and its squadrons received a Distinguished Unit Citation for the effectiveness of its bombing in the Ardennes, 23–25 December 1944, when the group made numerous attacks on enemy lines of communications. It flew several night missions in February 1945, using B-26s as flare planes, an A-26 for target marking, and A-20s to bomb the objectives. Continued to fly support and interdictory missions, aiding the drive across the Rhine and into Germany, February— April 1945. The group converted to Douglas A-26 Invader aircraft, but the war ended before the group was ready to fly them in combat.

The group returned to the US, June— August 1945, where it was inactivated on 7 November 1945.

=== 4042d Strategic Wing ===
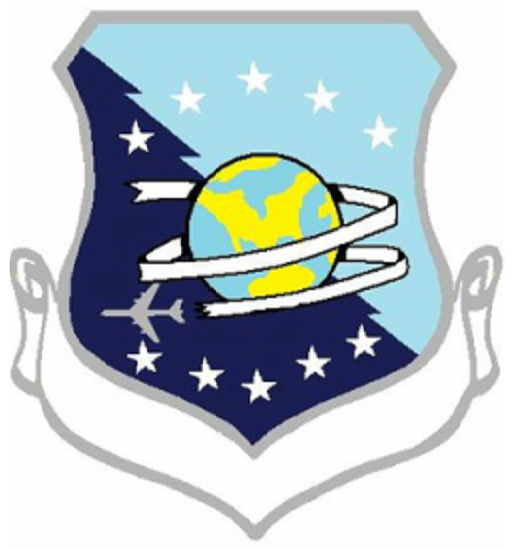
4042d Strategic Wing emblem

The precursor to the 410th Air Expeditionary Wing can be traced to 1 August 1958, when Strategic Air Command established the 4042d Strategic Wing at K. I. Sawyer AFB, Michigan as part of SAC's plan to disperse its B-52 Stratofortress heavy bombers over a larger number of bases, thus making it more difficult for the Soviet Union to knock out the entire fleet with a surprise first strike.

The wing remained a headquarters only until 1 May 1960 when the 923d Air Refueling Squadron, flying Boeing KC-135 Stratotankers and a nuclear weapons (known as "special weapons") security squadron were activated and assigned to the wing. The wing had been assigned to the 40th Air Division since 1 July 1959. The 69th Munitions Maintenance Squadron, responsible for overseeing the wing's nuclear weapons, was activated in March 1961 and the 923d was discontinued in April and its personnel, equipment, and mission were transferred to the newly activated 46th Air Refueling Squadron The wing became fully operational in June, when the 526th Bombardment Squadron (BS), consisting of 15 B-52Hs, moved from Homestead AFB, Florida, where it had been one of the three squadrons of the 379th Bombardment Wing. and three maintenance squadrons were organized. Starting in 1960, one third of the wing's aircraft were maintained on fifteen-minute alert, fully fueled and ready for combat to reduce vulnerability to a Soviet missile strike. This was increased to half the wing's aircraft in 1962. The 4042d (and later the 410th) continued this alert commitment through the Cold War. In 1962, the wing's bombers began to be equipped with the GAM-77 Hound Dog and the GAM-72 Quail air-launched cruise missiles, The 4042d Airborne Missile Maintenance Squadron was activated in November to maintain these missiles.

SAC Strategic Wings were Major Air Command Controlled, or MAJCON, units. MAJCON units could not carry a permanent history or lineage. SAC looked for a way to make its Strategic Wings permanent. In 1962, in order to perpetuate the lineage of many currently inactive bombardment units with illustrious World War II records, Headquarters SAC received authority from Headquarters USAF to discontinue its Major Command controlled (MAJCON) strategic wings that were equipped with combat aircraft and to activate Air Force controlled (AFCON) units, most of which were inactive at the time. AFCON wings could carry a lineage and history.

=== Strategic Air Command ===
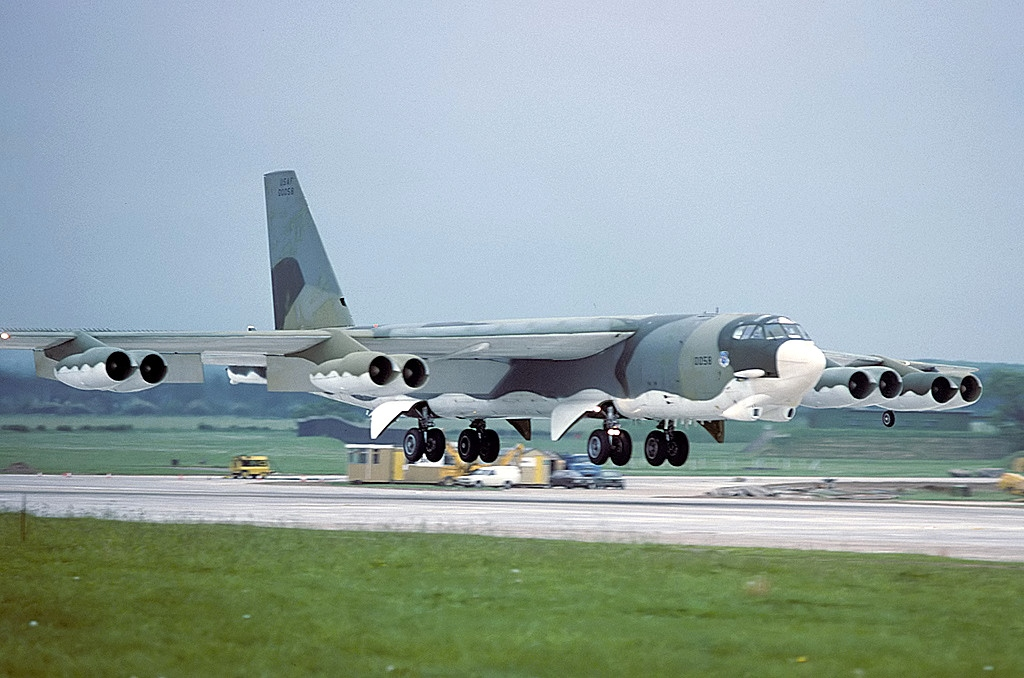
410th Bomb Wing B-52H Stratofortress

The 4042d was replaced by the newly constituted 410th Bombardment Wing (410th BW) on 1 February 1963. (Note: Although the 410th Wing was a new organization, it continued, through temporary bestowal, the history, and honors of the World War II 410th Bombardment Group. It was also entitled to retain the honors (but not the history or lineage) of the 4042d. This temporary bestowal ended in 1984 when the wing and group were consolidated into a single unit,) The 526th BS was replaced by the 644th Bombardment Squadron, one of the unit's World War II historical bombardment squadrons. The 46th Air Refueling Squadron and 69th Munitions Maintenance Squadron transferred to the 410th. Maintenance and security squadrons were replaced by ones with the designation of the newly established wing. Each of the new units assumed the personnel, equipment, and mission of its predecessor. Under the Dual Deputate organization, all were directly assigned to the wing, no operational or maintenance group was activated. The history, lineage and honors of the 410th Bombardment Group were temporarily bestowed upon the newly established wing upon activation.

The 410th BW continued to conduct strategic bombardment training and air refueling operations to meet operational commitments of Strategic Air Command. From 1964 to 1975, the wing supported combat operations over Vietnam by rotating B-52 and KC-135 flight crews to Guam and Okinawa. In 1980, two crews assigned to the 644th Bombardment Squadron of the 410th BW (S-21 and S-31) were awarded the Mackay Trophy for "executing a nonstop, around-the-world mission with the immediate objective of locating and photographing elements of the Soviet Navy operating in the Persian Gulf.

The 410th was reassigned directly to Eighth Air Force on 8 June 1988 and redesignated the 410th Wing on 1 September 1991 when SAC implemented the Objective Wing concept. On 1 June 1992, the redesignated 410th Bomb Wing was assigned to the new Air Combat Command. The wing adapted the tail code "KI" for its aircraft. The KC-135A equipped 46th Air Refueling Squadron was reassigned to the Air Mobility Command 305th Operations Group at McGuire Air Force Base, New Jersey on 1 June 1992, leaving the wing with only the 644th Bomb Squadron with B-52Hs.

The B-52s were transferred to both the 5th Bomb Wing at Minot Air Force Base, North Dakota and the 2d Bomb Wing at Barksdale Air Force Base, Louisiana on 21 November 1994, in preparation for the wing being inactivated on 30 September 1995 when K. I. Sawyer was closed in accordance with 1993 Base Realignment and Closure Commission decisions.

=== 2003 Beginning of Iraq War ===
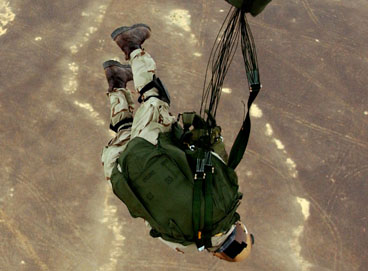
A pararescue jumper with the 410th Air Expeditionary Wing jumps from a C-130 into Afghanistan. (USAF photo by SSgt. Jeremy T. Lock)

The 410th Air Expeditionary Wing was activated as part of the 2003 invasion of Iraq. It was based at Azraq, Jordan (Note: "... The definite answer [to the wing's location may have been] given by U.S. military personnel. The key [was] a handful posts from 410th AEW personnel via their public and non-secured web and e-mail access . . . In all cases the main part of the related e-mail address was ...@azab.aorcentaf.af.mil (azab = Azraq Air Base, aorcentaf = Area of Responsibility, Central Command Air Forces, af = Air Force, mil = Military). . . The 410th AEW and their assigned F-16s were . . . deployed to Shahid Muafaq Al-Salti Air Base near Azraq, called Azraq AB by U.S. CENTAF. . ." "Operation Iraqi Freedom (F-16 Combat History)". F-16.net – The Ultimate F-16 Site. 2 February 2006.) and Prince Hassan Air Base (H-5), Jordan. Flying in support of U.S. Special Operations Command Central task forces, the 410 AEW's pilots, flying General Dynamics F-16 Fighting Falcon and Republic A-10 Thunderbolt II aircraft, pursued enemy equipment, personnel, and high-value targets, including regime leadership. Other aircraft assigned to H-5 included HC-130 Hercules and HH-60 Pave Hawk helicopters in support of USAF Pararescue personnel. H-5 also was the location of one of a few U.S. Army MIM-104 Patriot batteries emplaced to protect Israel from Scud surface-to-surface missile attack. Additional corroboration for Azraq being one of the wing's bases includes that the 410th AEW was supporting special forces, and that RAF Canberras referred to below were based at Azraq, Jordan.

Upon arrival of the A-10 Thunderbolt IIs to H-5, the Jordanian government requested the aircraft be relocated to another bare base further north on the Iraqi border citing health concerns due to the uranium-tipped 30mm munitions used by its G8/A Avenger Gatling gun. Personnel had to convoy tons of ammunition from K-5 to the northern base to support the A-10 relocation.

During the operation, the Jordanian government denied U.S. troops were stationed at H-5 and Shahid Muafaq Al-Salti Air Base. This created a lot of concern with Jordanian military personnel stationed at Shahid Muafaq Al-Salti Air Base during the initial stages. As they were being told on television and radio that there were no U.S. troops on Jordanian soil, USAF C-17 aircraft were arriving on a daily bases with personnel and supplies. Out of confusion, Jordanian Security Forces documented everything leaving the aircraft. U.S. personnel removed labels and explosive decals from the containers, as not to aggravate the situation. American troops initially were not allowed to carry weapons in plain sight. So they carried their Beretta 9mm handguns hidden in their waistbands for protection and hid their M-4 carbines from view in their vehicles.

U.S military personnel were housed at two tent cities, one on Shahid Muafaq Al-Salti Air Base proper, and another large tent city located about one mile away near the base, which contained the majority of personnel. In the first month of their deployment, U.S personnel faced occasional hostile action at Shahid Muafaq Al-Salti Air Base. During one early morning incident, an explosion occurred adjacent to the tent city perimeter rocking the base. A-10 aircraft initially assigned to H-5, were dispatched from their northern base to confront the threat. Upon arrival, the aircraft spotted a vehicle in the open desert near the tent city. Pilots observed a man holding a cylindrical shaped object, throw it into his truck, and flee. Pilots requested permission to open fire on the vehicle, but the request was denied. After this incident, Jordanian Special Forces personnel were positioned around the tent city in HMMWV's with 50 cal. machine guns to protect personnel. On a nightly basis, personnel reported seeing flares, aka "slap flares", being fired near the base in the distance. After the first incident, Jordanian Intelligence response was U.S. personnel merely saw lights falling off a construction crane. During another incident, U.S. security personnel reported hearing and seeing protesters at the Shahid Muafaq Al-Salti Air Base perimeter. Jordanian Intelligence explained that personnel heard fans at a nearby soccer field cheering and it was not protesters at all. One evening a security tower reported machine gun fire coming from a road nearby toward their position. Jordanian Special Forces returned fire with their 50 cal. machine guns and quelled the threat. Jordanian Intelligence the next day explained that personnel merely saw someone firing into the air at a nearby restaurant where a wedding party was being held. Throughout the deployment numerous security posts reported persons approaching their posts in the night and fleeing once challenged. Jordanian Intelligence could not explain these incidents.

In total, during 2003, the wing flew 9,651 fighter and attack hours in twenty-six days flying attacking Iraqi tactical ballistic-missile activities and never left the special operations forces in western Iraq without air cover. Often flying in extremely hazardous conditions in and around Iraq, the wing's crews generated 2,547 sorties, providing around-the-clock, time-sensitive targeting, interdiction, OCA, CAS, ISR, and CSAR missions deep within enemy territory. Neither Azraq nor H-5 had much supporting infrastructure and logistics. The wing accurately fired more than 600 precision-guided munitions and expended a total of 800,000 pounds of weapons. In addition to eliminating TBM support equipment, the wing is credited with destroying aircraft, armored vehicles, artillery pieces, surface-to-air missile systems, ammunition supply dumps, radars, and enemy troops.

The wing is also credited with the destruction of two Ba'ath Party headquarters buildings in western and central Iraq. Although the wing was engaged in more than 200 troops in contact scenarios, there were no fratricide events. During the 2003 invasion of Iraq, wing personnel supplied thirty F-16s, four HH-60s, four HC-130s, eight RAF GR.7 Harriers, and two PR.9 Canberras with 130,000 gallons of fuel per day for twenty-three days.

It appears that the 30 F-16s deployed were sent by the 120th Fighter Squadron, Colorado Air National Guard (16 aircraft); the 160th Fighter Squadron, Alabama Air National Guard (14 aircraft); and a total of six aircraft from the 93rd, 457th, and 466th Fighter Squadrons of the Air Force Reserve.

== Lineage ==
410th Bombardment Group

- Constituted as 410th Bombardment Group (Light) on 16 June 1943

Activated on 1 July 1943
Redesignated as 410th Bombardment Group, Light on 17 April 1944
Inactivated on 7 November 1945
Consolidated on 1 January 1984 with the 410th Bombardment Wing as the 410th Bombardment Wing

410th Wing

- Constituted as 410th Bombardment Wing, Heavy on 15 November 1962

Activated on 15 November 1962.
Organized on 1 February 1963
Consolidated on 1 January 1984 with 410th Bombardment Group, Light
Redesignated as 410th Wing on 1 September 1991
Redesignated as 410th Bomb Wing on 1 June 1992
Inactivated on 30 September 1995

- Redesignated as 410th Air Expeditionary Wing and converted to provisional status, September 2002.

=== Assignments ===
- III Air Support Command, 1 July 1943
- Army Air Forces School of Applied Tactics, 8 February 1944
- 97th Bombardment Wing, 4 April 1944
- Continental Air Forces, August 1945-7 November 1945
- Strategic Air Command, 15 November 1962
- 40th Air Division, 1 February 1963
- 4th Strategic Aerospace Division, 1 September 1964
- 40th Air Division, 31 March 1970
- Eighth Air Force, 8 January 1988 – 30 September 1995
- Air Combat Command to activate or inactivate any time after September 2002

Attached to United States Central Command Air Forces, 2003–unknown

=== Stations ===
- Will Rogers Field, Oklahoma, 1 July 1943
- Muskogee Army Air Field, Oklahoma, October 1943
- Laurel Army Air Field, Mississippi, January 1944
- Lakeland Army Air Field, Florida, c. 8 February-c. 13 March 1944
- RAF Birch (AAF-149), England, c. 4 April 1944
- RAF Gosfield (AAF-154), England, c. 16 April 1944
- Coulommiers Airfield (A-58), France, September 1944
- Juvincourt Airfield (A-68), France, February 1945
- Beaumont sur Oise Airfield (A-60), France, May–June 1945
- Seymour Johnson Field, North Carolina, August 1945
- Myrtle Beach Army Air Field, South Carolina, c. 5 October-7 November 1945
- K. I. Sawyer AFB, Michigan, November 1962 – December 1994
- Prince Hassan Air Base (H-5), 2003
- Shahid Muafaq Al-Salti Air Base, 2003

=== Components ===
- 410th Operations Group (later 410th Expeditionary Operations Group), 1 September 1991 – 30 September 1995; 2003 – unknown
- 46th Air Refueling Squadron: 1 February 1963 – 1 September 1991
- 307th Air Refueling Squadron: 30 September 1985 – 1 August 1990
- 644th Bombardment Squadron: 1 July 1943 – 7 November 1945; 1 February 1963 – 1 September 1991
- 645th Bombardment Squadron: 1 July 1943 – 7 November 1945
- 646th Bombardment Squadron: 1 July 1943 – 7 November 1945
- 647th Bombardment Squadron: 1 July 1943 – 7 November 1945

=== Aircraft assigned ===
- A-20 Havoc, 1943–1945
- A-26 Invader, 1945
- KC-135A (1961–1993)
- B-52H (1963–1994)
- F-16 Fighting Falcon (since 2001)
- A-10 Thunderbolt II (since 2001)
- HH-60 (since 2001)
- AV-8B (since 2001)
- English Electric Canberra (Attached from Royal Air Force) (2001–2006)

== See also ==
- List of B-52 Units of the United States Air Force
- List of MAJCOM wings of the United States Air Force
