= 526th Bombardment Squadron =

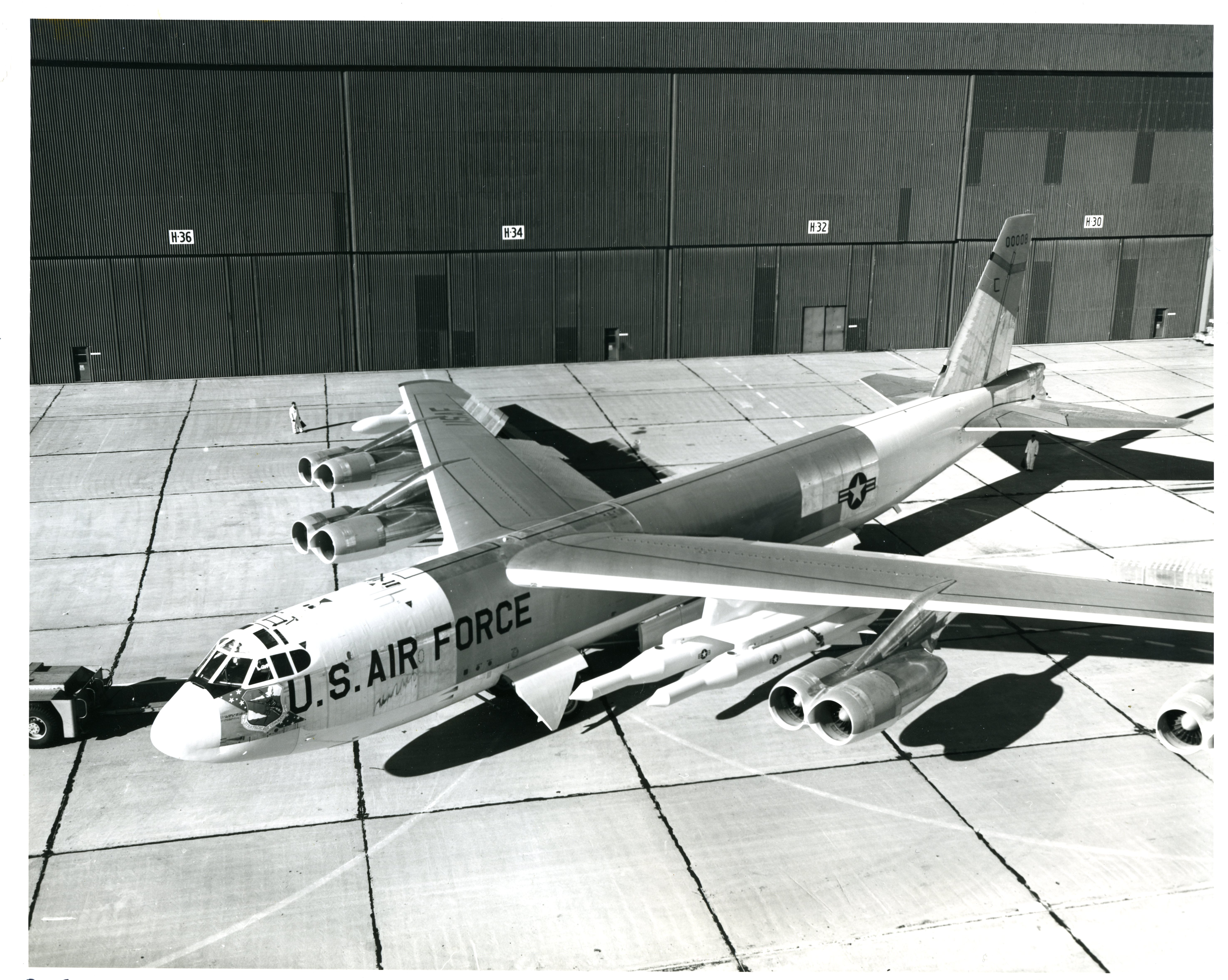
- B-52H Stratofortress as flown by the squadron
- Active: 1942–1945; 1955–1963
- Country: United States
- Branch: United States Air Force
- Role: Heavy bomber
- Engagements: European Theater of Operations
- Decorations: Distinguished Unit Citation

Insignia
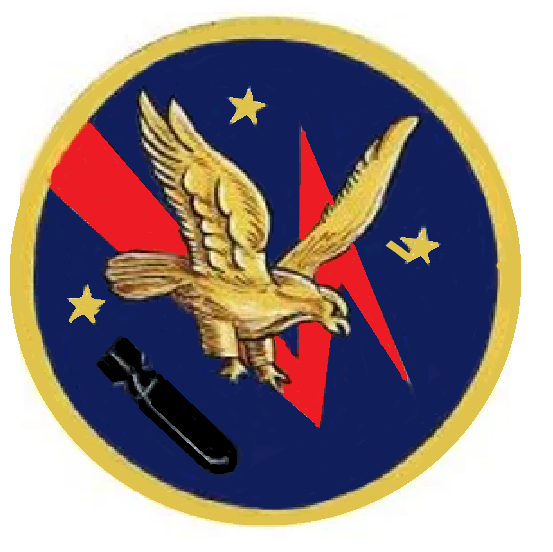
- 526th Bombardment Squadron emblem (Note: Approved 10 July 1943. Description: On a light blue disc, border yellow orange a red lightning bolt bendwise surmounted by a golden falcon, outlined black; three mullets gold, one in chief, one to sinister, and one to dexter, in base a black aerial bomb falling bendwise.)
- World War II Fuselage code: LF

The 526th Bombardment Squadron is an inactive United States Air Force unit. It was last assigned to the 4042d Strategic Wing at K. I. Sawyer Air Force Base, Michigan, where it was inactivated on 1 February 1963 when Strategic Air Command replaced its MAJCON wings with wings that could continue a heritage.

The squadron was first activated during World War II as the 526th Bombardment Squadron. After training in the United States, it moved to England, where it participated in the strategic bombing campaign against Germany. The squadron twice was awarded the Distinguished Unit Citation for its combat actions. Following V-E Day, the squadron moved to Morocco, where it participated in the transportation of military personnel back to the United States until it was inactivated in June 1945.

The squadron was reactivated in 1955 as a Boeing B-47 Stratojet strategic bomber squadron. In 1960, it began converting to the Boeing B-52 Stratofortress. However, Strategic Air Command was engaged in a project to disperse its B-52 wings to reduce their vulnerability to Soviet attack and the squadron moved to K.I. Sawyer in 1961.

== History ==
=== World War II ===
==== Activation and training ====
The squadron was first activated at Geiger Field, Washington in November 1942 as one of the four original squadrons of the 379th Bombardment Group. After initial organization, a cadre moved to Wendover Field, Utah to begin training as a heavy bomber unit with the Boeing B-17 Flying Fortress. Training was completed by early April 1943, and the ground echelon moved to Camp Williams, Wisconsin on 9 April, then proceeded to the port of embarkation at Camp Shanks, New York, where it boarded the RMS Aquitania for shipment to England in early May. The air echelon moved to Dow Field, Maine to ferry their Flying Fortresses via the North Atlantic Ferry Route, starting on 15 April.

==== Combat in the European Theater ====
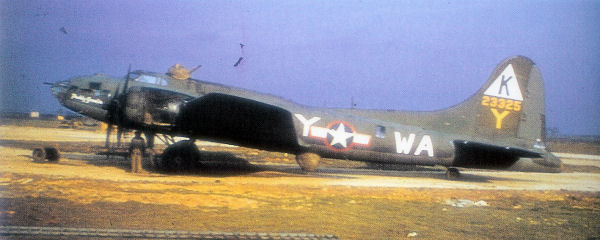
Squadron B-17 at RAF Kimbolton (Note: Aircraft is Douglas built Boeing B-17F-45-DL Flying Fortress, serial 42-3325, Paddy Gremlin. On 30 January 1944, it was struck by bombs dropped by a plane higher in the formation and crashed near the Belgian border, with all aircrew becoming prisoners of war. Eight crewmembers were wounded when an enemy aircraft strafed the wrecked plane. Baugher, Joe (3 April 2023). "1942 USAF Serial Numbers". Joe Baugher.)

The air echelon of the squadron arrived at RAF Bovingdon by 24 April 1943, and remained there until 20 May, when it joined the ground echelon at RAF Kimbolton, which was to be its combat station for the remainder of its time in the European Theater of Operations. The squadron flew its first combat mission on 29 May, and focused on the strategic bombing campaign against Germany. This mission was the starting point for the first Distinguished Unit Citation (DUC) awarded to the squadron for its sustained actions through the end of July 1944. Targets included industrial sites, oil refineries, storage plants, submarine pens, airfields and communications centers in Germany, France, the Netherlands, Belgium, Norway and Poland. Targets included a chemical plant in Ludwigshafen, an aircraft assembly plant in Braunschweig, ball bearing plants at Schweinfurt and Leipzig, synthetic oil refineries at Merseburg and Gelsenkirchen, marshalling yards at Hamm and Reims and airfields in le Mesnil-au-Val and Berlin. The squadron received a second DUC for its attack on the Focke-Wulf Fw 190 aircraft factory at Oschersleben and the Junkers factory at Halberstadt on 11 January 1944. The programmed fighter escort encountered prohibitive weather, as did two of the three divisions making the attack. However, weather in the east was sufficiently clear that the Luftwaffe was able to assemble the largest interceptor force to oppose an attack for the preceding three months. However, the squadron flew into enemy territory without fighter escort to complete its mission.

The squadron was occasionally diverted from the strategic bombing campaign to perform close air support and interdiction missions. It supported Operation Crossbow by attacking V-1 flying bomb and V-2 rocket launch sites. It bombed airfields, radar stations and other installations to prepare for Operation Overlord, the Normandy invasion in June 1944. On D-Day, it bombed defended positions just ahead of the Allied landings and struck airfields, rail choke points, and gun emplacements during the campaign that followed.

During the Northern France Campaign, the squadron bombed enemy positions to assist ground troops during Operation Cobra, the breakout at Saint Lo on 24 and 25 July 1944. It attacked German communications and fortifications during the Battle of the Bulge, from December 1944 through January 1945 and bombed bridges and viaducts in France and Germany to aid the Allied assault across the Rhine, from February to March 1945. The squadron flew its last mission on 25 April 1945.

After V-E Day the squadron was detailed for the Green Project, which called for moving 50,000 American troops back to the United States each month. The squadron moved to Casablanca Airfield, French Morocco, but in June, Air Transport Command decided to use its own, more flexible organization (Note: Air Transport Command had reorganized its overseas units under the AAF Base Unit System in 1944. See Goss, p. 75 for the reasons for this reorganization.) for the project and the squadron was inactivated on 25 July 1945.

=== Strategic Air Command ===
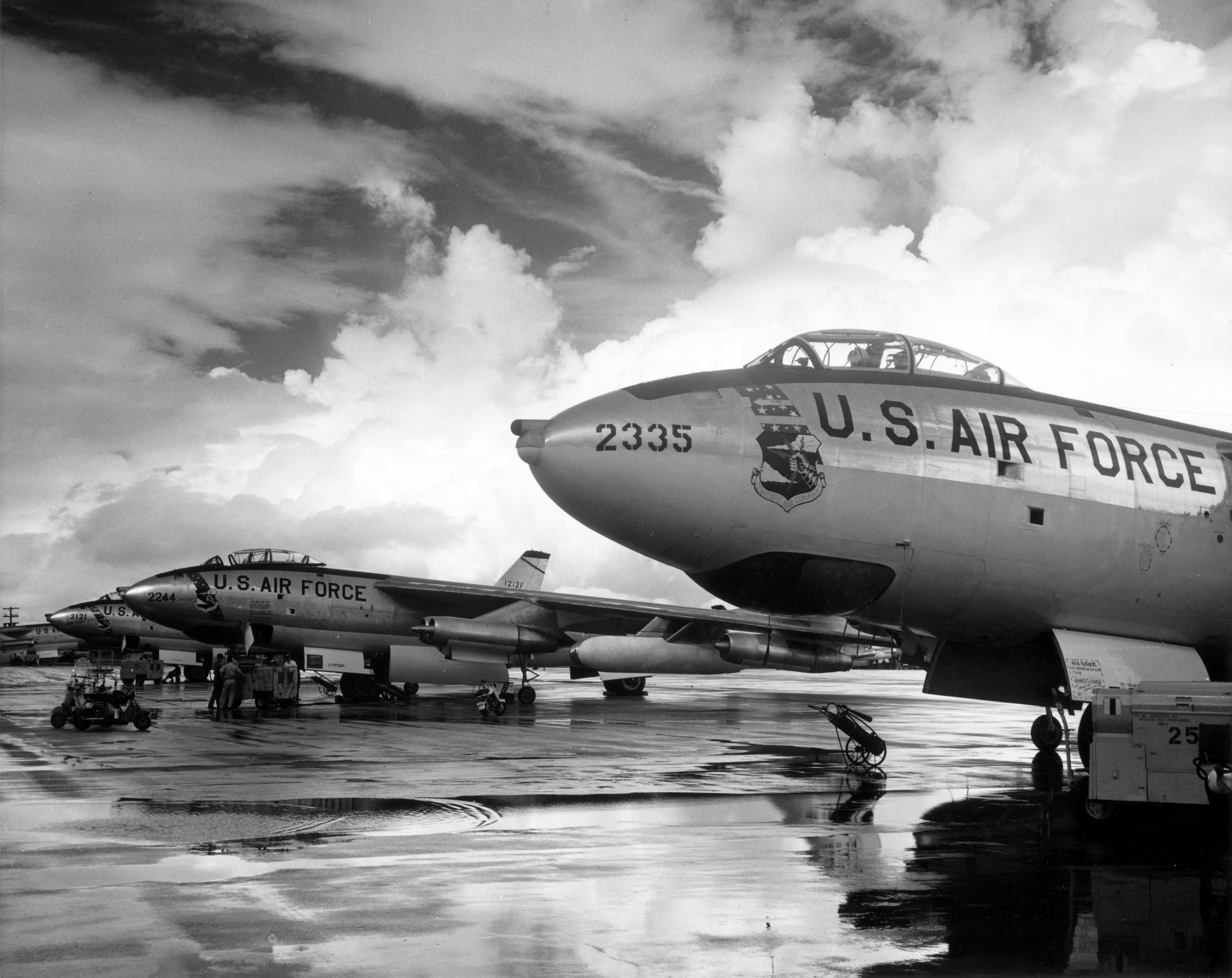
Strategic Air Command B-47 Stratojets

The squadron was reactivated at Homestead Air Force Base, Florida in November 1955 and assigned to the 379th Bombardment Wing. The unit's first few months were spent in organizing and manning as a Strategic Air Command (SAC) bomber unit. It received its Boeing B-47 Stratojet bombers in April 1956 and began training for strategic bombing operations. Once the wing became combat ready, it began overseas Operation Reflex alert operations training, sending five Stratojets to Sidi Slimane Air Base, Morocco. Reflex placed Stratojets and Boeing KC-97s at bases closer to the Soviet Union for 90 day periods, although individuals rotated back to home bases during unit Reflex deployments

From 1958, SAC's B-47 wings began to assume an alert posture at their home bases, reducing the amount of time spent on alert at overseas bases. General Thomas S. Power's initial goal was to maintain one third of SAC's planes on fifteen minute ground alert, fully fueled and ready for combat to reduce vulnerability to a Soviet missile strike. This program was short lived for the squadron. In October 1960, it began to transfer its B-47s to other units, becoming non-operational.

The squadron moved on paper to K.I. Sawyer Air Force Base, Michigan in June 1961 where it was assigned to the 4042d Strategic Wing. At K.I. Sawyer, the squadron was equipped with Boeing B-52H Stratofortress heavy bombers. The 4042d wing had been established by SAC in a program to disperse its B-52 heavy bombers over a larger number of bases, thus making it more difficult for the Soviet Union to knock out the entire fleet with a surprise first strike. SAC bases with large concentrations of bombers made attractive targets. SAC's response was to break up its wings and scatter their aircraft over a larger number of bases.

The squadron conducted worldwide strategic bombardment training missions. Its alert commitment was increased to half the squadron's aircraft in 1962. During the 1962 Cuban Missile Crisis, on 22 October, 1/8 of SAC's B-52s were placed on airborne alert. On 24 October SAC went to DEFCON 2, placing all aircraft on alert. As tensions eased, on 21 November SAC returned to normal airborne alert posture. went to DEFCON 3 on 24 November, and on 27 November returned to normal alert posture.

In February 1963, The 410th Bombardment Wing assumed the aircraft, personnel and equipment of the discontinued 4042d Wing. The 4042d was a Major Command controlled (MAJCON) wing, which could not carry a permanent history or lineage, and SAC wanted to replace it with a permanent unit. The 526th was inactivated and transferred its personnel and equipment to the 450th Wing's 644th Bombardment Squadron.

== Lineage ==
- Constituted as the 526th Bombardment Squadron (Heavy) on 28 October 1942

Activated on 3 November 1942
Redesignated 526th Bombardment Squadron, Heavy c. 20 August 1943
Inactivated on 25 July 1945
Redesignated 526th Bombardment Squadron, Medium on 12 July 1955
Activated on 1 November 1955
Redesignated 526th Bombardment Squadron, Heavy on 9 January 1961
Discontinued and inactivated on 1 February 1963

=== Assignments ===
- 379th Bombardment Group, 3 November 1942 – 25 July 1945
- 379th Bombardment Wing, 1 November 1955
- 19th Bombardment Wing, 9 January 1961
- 4042d Strategic Wing, 1 June 1961 – 1 February 1963

=== Stations ===
- Geiger Field, Washington, 3 November 1942
- Wendover Field, Utah, 2 December 1942
- Sioux City Army Air Base, Iowa, 2 February–9 April 1943
- RAF Kimbolton (AAF-117), England, 20 May 1943 – 12 June 1945
- Casablanca Airfield, French Morocco, 17 June–25 July 1945
- Homestead Air Force Base, Florida, 1 November 1955
- K. I. Sawyer Air Force Base, Michigan, 1 June 1961 – 1 February 1963

=== Aircraft ===
- Boeing B-17 Flying Fortress, 1942–1945
- Boeing B-47 Stratojet, 1956–1961
- Boeing B-52 Stratofortress, 1961–1963

=== Awards and campaigns ===
Award streamer	Award	Dates	Notes
	Distinguished Unit Citation	29 May 1943-31 July 1944	Continental Europe
	Distinguished Unit Citation	11 January 1944	Germany

Campaign Streamer	Campaign	Dates	Notes
	Air Offensive, Europe	21 May 1943 – 5 June 1944	
	Air Combat, EAME Theater	21 May 1943 – 11 May 1945	
	Normandy	6 June 1944 – 24 July 1944	
	Northern France	25 July 1944 – 14 September 1944	
	Rhineland	15 September 1944 – 21 March 1945	
	Ardennes-Alsace	16 December 1944 – 25 January 1945	
	Central Europe	22 March 1945 – 21 May 1945	

== See also ==
- List of B-52 Units of the United States Air Force
- List of B-47 units of the United States Air Force
- B-17 Flying Fortress units of the United States Army Air Forces
