= RAF Gosfield =

Former Royal Air Force station

RAF Gosfield USAAF Station AAF-154
- Near Braintree, Essex in England
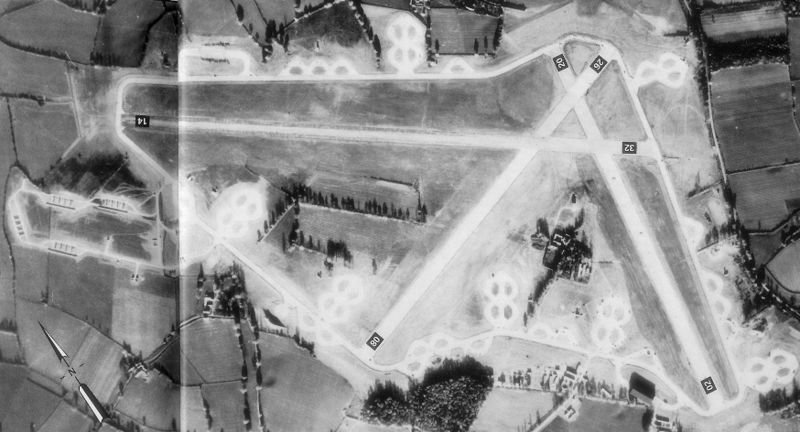
- Gosfield airfield photographed in March 1945

Site information
- Type: Royal Air Force Station
- Owner: Air Ministry
- Operator: Royal Air Force; United States Army Air Forces
- Controlled by: RAF Bomber Command; Ninth Air Force

Location
- Shown within Essex RAF Gosfield (the United Kingdom)
- Coordinates: 51°57′11″N 000°34′48″E

Site history
- Built: 1942/43
- In use: 1943 - 1946
- Battles/wars: European theatre of World War II

Airfield information
- Elevation: 89 metres (292 ft) AMSL
Runways
Direction	Length and surface
01/19	Asphalt
07/25	Asphalt
12/30	Asphalt

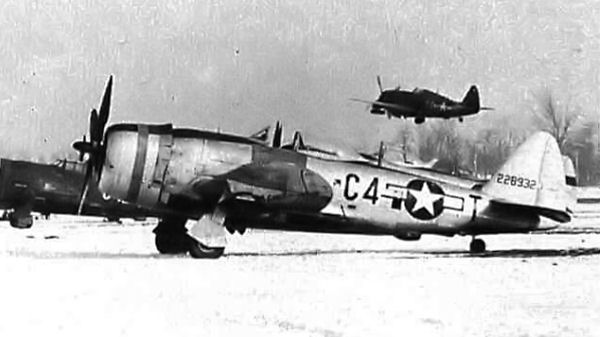
Republic P-47D-28-RA Thunderbolt, Serial 42-28932 of the 388th Fighter Squadron.

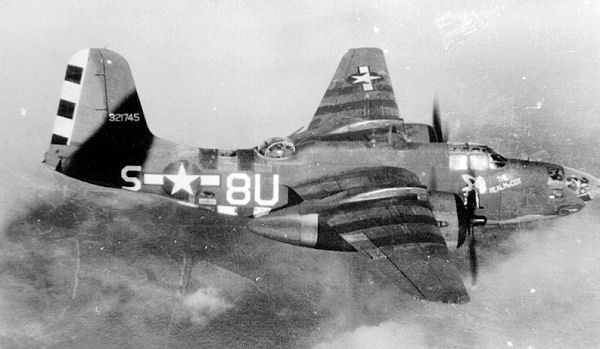
Douglas A-20J-15-DO Havoc Serial 43-21745 of the 646th Bombardment Squadron.

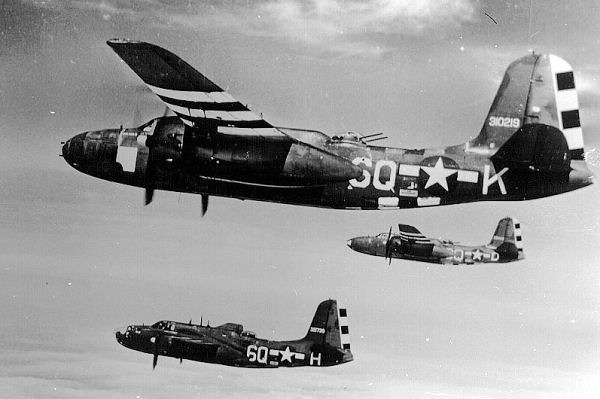
Douglas A-20Gs of the 647th Bombardment Squadron. A-20G-35-DO Serial 43-10219 identifiable

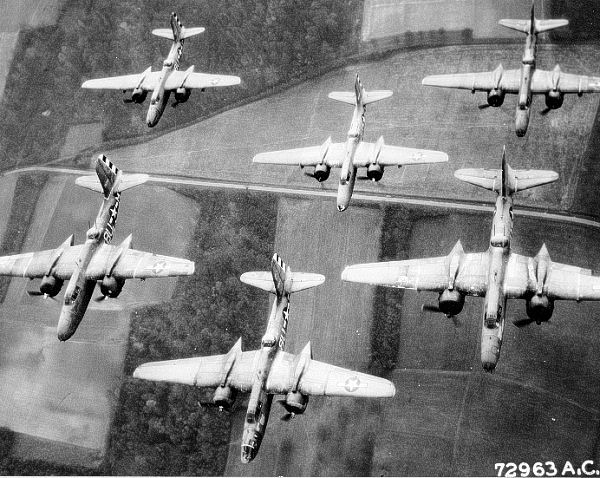
Formation of 646th Bombardment Squadron A-20s.

Royal Air Force Gosfield or more simply RAF Gosfield is a former Royal Air Force station located approximately 5 miles (8 km) north of Braintree, Essex, England.

Established in 1943, it was used by both the Royal Air Force and United States Army Air Forces. During the Second World War it was used primarily as a combat airfield, with several fighter and bomber units stationed at it. After the war it was closed in 1955 after being held in reserve for many years.

Today the remains of the airfield are located on private property being used as agricultural fields.

== History ==
Gosfield was also one of the airfields where the main construction work was carried out by US Army engineers. The 816th Engineer Battalion (Aviation) arrived at Gosfield on 16 August 1942 where they began setting up tented accommodation. Shortages of construction equipment and other problems caused delays in the early months. By December 1942, the overall airfield building program was in crisis and falling further behind schedule due to the lack of labour and resources. By March 1943, most of the 816th's men were transferred to the more advanced site at RAF Andrews Field. Full-scale construction of Gosfield was resumed in August and by mid-October 1943 the main elements of the landing area had been completed. The 833rd Engineer Aviation Battalion arrived in October 1943 and helped complete Gosfield, including buildings and the drainage system. However, by the time it was completed the Eighth Air Force no longer required the airfield and it was passed to the control of the US Ninth Air Force.

=== USAAF use ===
Gosfield was known as USAAF Station AAF-154 for security reasons by the USAAF during the war, and by which it was referred to instead of location. Its USAAF Station Code was "GF".

==== 365th Fighter Group ====
The first combat flying unit to occupy Gosfield was the 365th Fighter Group, arriving on 22 December 1943 from Richmond AAF, Virginia flying Republic P-47 Thunderbolts. Operational squadrons of the group were:

- 386th Fighter Squadron (D5)
- 387th Fighter Squadron (B4)
- 388th Fighter Squadron (C4)

The 365th was a group of Ninth Air Force's 84th Fighter Wing, IX Tactical Air Command.

Early missions were flown in support of Eighth Air Force Boeing B-17 Flying Fortress and Consolidated B-24 Liberator bomber operations and on one of these on 2 March,

On 5 March, with only nine missions to its credit the group moved south to RAF Beaulieu in Hampshire.

==== 397th Bombardment Group ====
On 5 April 1944 Martin B-26 Marauders of the 397th Bombardment Group started to arrive at Gosfield after a trans-Atlantic crossing from Hunter Army Airfield, Georgia by the southern route via Africa. Operational squadrons of the group were:

- 596th Bombardment Squadron (X2)
- 597th Bombardment Squadron (9F)
- 598th Bombardment Squadron (U2)
- 599th Bombardment Squadron (6B)

However. no sooner had they arrived than they were moved on to RAF Rivenhall when that airfield was vacated by the 363d Fighter Group on 14 April.

==== 410th Bombardment Group ====
The day following the 397th's departure, personnel of the 410th Bombardment Group moved in from RAF Birch. The 410th was equipped with Douglas A-20G and A-20J Havoc light twin engined bombers which it had trained in the United States. Operational squadrons of the group were:

- 644th Bombardment Squadron (5D)
- 645th Bombardment Squadron (7X)
- 646th Bombardment Squadron (8U)
- 647th Bombardment Squadron (6Q)

Following the Allied break-out from the Normandy beachhead in late July, and the subsequent sweep across France. The 410th, moved to France on 18 September 1944. On the continent, the 410th continued operations until V-E Day, eventually being stationed at Beaumont-sur-Oise, France. The group returned to the United States during the summer of 1945, and was inactivated at Myrtle Beach AAF, South Carolina on 7 November 1945.

=== RAF Bomber Command use ===
In January 1945, the RAF's No. 299 Squadron RAF moved in from RAF Wethersfield for two weeks with Short Stirlings but soon departed for RAF Shepherds Grove. Gosfield being selected as another of the launch bases for the First Allied Airborne Army's support for the crossing of the Rhine.

With the end of hostilities jurisdiction subsequently passed from one RAF headquarters to another until Gosfield airfield was closed down during February 1946.

== Current use ==
Long sections of the perimeter track remain, although only as a single lane agricultural road. All of the dispersal hardstands have been removed, along with the main runway and 02/20 secondary runway, both of which no longer exist. The 08/26 secondary runway remains largely intact with the east end being used for lorry trailer storage, although the trailers appear to be derelict.

The group of buildings in the control tower area survived and were developed for light engineering and plant hire operations and are in use. Part of the technical site appears to be a storage area for sea-land ocean containers. Several Nissen Huts also remain in use.

== See also ==
- List of former Royal Air Force stations
