= Coulommiers – Voisins Aerodrome =

Airfield in France

Coulommiers - Voisins Aerodrome Advanced Landing Ground (ALG) A-58 Aérodrome de Coulommiers - Voisins
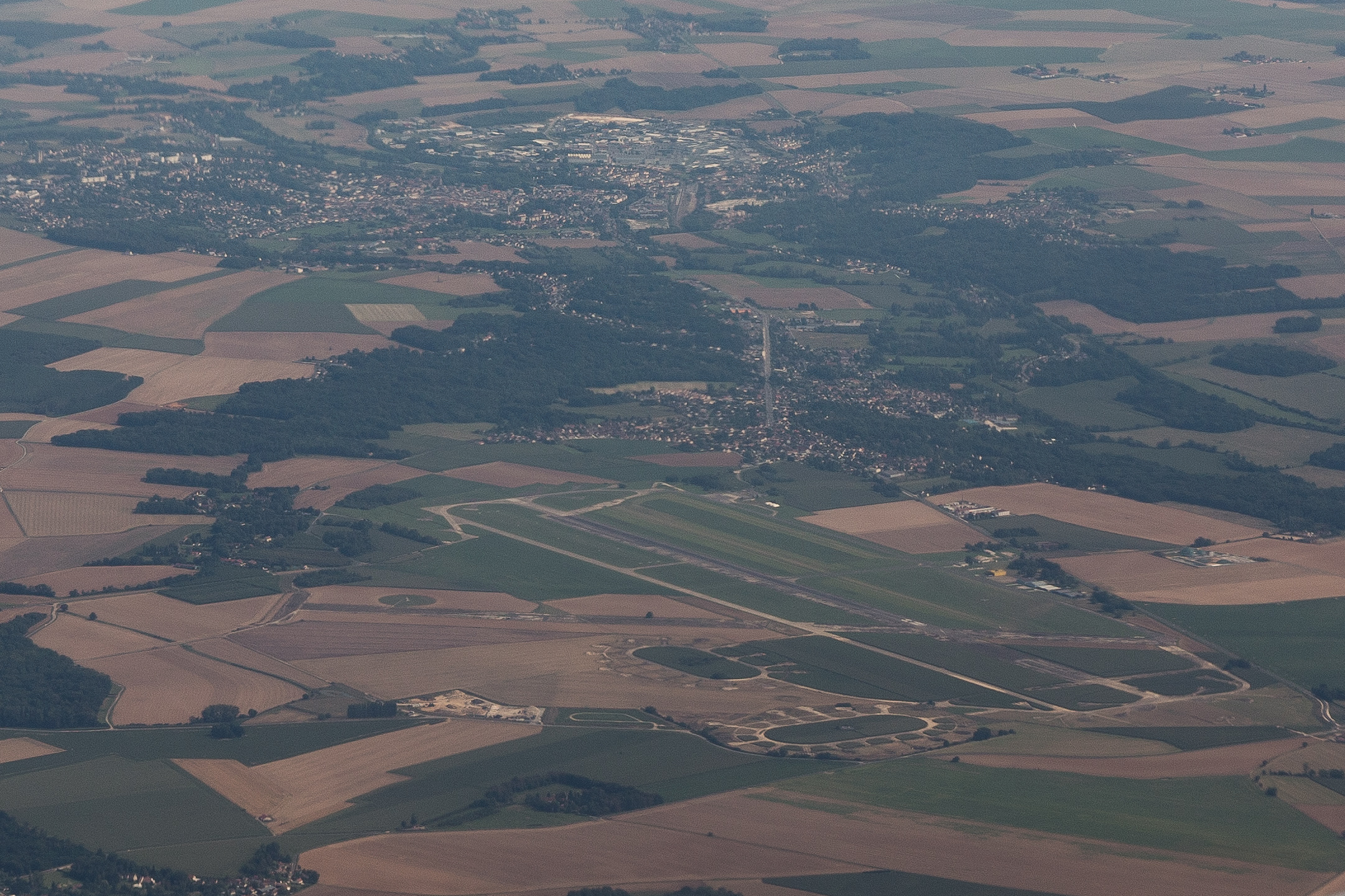
- IATA: none; ICAO: LFPK

Summary
- Airport type: Public
- Operator: Aéroports de Paris
- Serves: Coulommiers, France
- Elevation AMSL: 470 ft (140 m)
- Coordinates: 48°50′15″N 003°00′52″E

Map
- Location of Coulommiers – Voisins Aerodrome

Runways
Direction	Length		Surface
Direction	m	ft	Surface
09C/27C	1,400	4,593	Concrete/Asphalt
09L/27R	650	2,133	Grass
09R/27L	660	2,165	Grass
- Sources: French AIP, UAF,

Coulommiers – Voisins Aerodrome (French: Aérodrome de Coulommiers - Voisins) (ICAO: LFPK) is a recreational airfield serving Coulommiers in France. It is located in the Seine-et-Marne department, 5 km (2.7 NM) west-northwest of Coulommiers. It is also 34 miles (55 km) east of Paris.

The aerodrome supports general aviation with no scheduled service from commercial airlines.

== Facilities ==
The airfield resides at an elevation of 470 feet (143 m) above mean sea level. It has one paved runway designated 09C/27C which measures 1,400 by 20 metres (4,593 ft × 66 ft). It also has two parallel grass runways: 09L/27R measuring 650 by 50 metres (2,133 ft × 164 ft) and 09R/27L measuring 660 by 80 metres (2,165 ft × 262 ft).

== History ==
=== Armée de l'Air use during World War II ===
Coulommiers Airfield has its direct origins in 1938 when the French Armée de l'Air established the base. French aviation had been ongoing in the area as far back as early balloon flights by the De Montgolfier brothers in 1783 and various glider and other aeronautical experiments in the 19th Century. The battles of the Marne were fought in the region during World War I, and numerous French and German aircraft were in the area.

The Armée de l'Air had stationed GC III/6 and GC III/7 at the airfield; GC III/6 was equipped with single-engine Morane-Saulnier M.S.406 fighters and GC III/7 with Bloch MB.220 fighters. With the outbreak of World War II in September 1939, additional squadrons of both French and Royal Air Force aircraft were assigned to Coulommiers, including RAF Supermarine Spitfires; various reconnaissance aircraft, and Dewoitine D.520 (GC I/3). Combat forces from the airfield fought in the Battle of France during May and June 1940, until the final armistice with Germany of 20 June.

=== German use ===
Seized by the Germans in June 1940 during the Battle of France, Coulommiers was used as a Luftwaffe military airfield during the occupation. Known units assigned (all from Luftlotte 3, Fliegerkorps IV):

- Kampfgeschwader 54 (KG 54) 10–26 July 1940 Junkers Ju 88A (Fuselage Code: B3+)

The Ju 88s from KG 54 were heavily engaged in the Battle of Britain from Coulommiers. The unit flew thousands of sorties during the Blitz, hitting targets all over the United Kingdom. The unit lost 265 killed, 121 missing, 63 as POWs and 65 wounded as well as 62 aircraft during the operation. The unit moved to Évreux in late July.

Destroyed German Messerschmitt Bf 110G and Junkers Ju 88G night fighters of NJG 4 at Coulommiers-Voisins in September 1944

After KG 54 moved out, the Luftwaffe also expanded the facility with an entirely new dispersal area in a wooded area to the northeast of the French airfield, building numerous dispersal pads and taxiways.

- Schnellkampfgeschwader 10 (SKG 10) September–October 1943 Focke-Wulf Fw 190A
- Kampfgeschwader 2 (KG 2) 11 April – 10 August 1943 Dornier Do 217E/K/M (Fuselage Code: U5+)

In 1943, Coulommiers was brought back online as an operational base, initially with day interceptor fighters (SKG 10) to attack USAAF Eighth Air Force heavy bombers as part of the "Defense of the Reich" campaign. KG 2 engaged in night bombing attacks over Britain and dropping naval mines in the English Channel and along the British east coast. These attacks drew the attention of the USAAF, and the airfield became the target of frequent attacks by Allied aircraft, being attacked on 14 June 1944 by Eighth Air Force Boeing B-17 Flying Fortresses; and by IX Bomber Command Martin B-26 Marauders on 23 June. On 27 June over 30 North American P-51 Mustangs attacked the airfield on strafing runs.

- Nachtjagdgeschwader 4 (NJG 4) 8 May – August 1944 Messerschmitt Bf 110 (Fuselage Code: U5+)

In the summer of 1944, NJG 4 moved in with RADAR-equipped Bf 110s, and engaged in night interceptor attacks against RAF Bombers. It remained until the Luftwaffe was forced to withdraw from Coulommiers as Allied ground forces were moving into the area during the Northern France Campaign. in August 1944.

=== American use ===
A-20 Havocs of the 410th Bombardment Group returning to advanced landing ground A-58 Coulommiers circa 1944

It was liberated by Allied ground forces about 1 September 1944 during the Northern France Campaign. Almost immediately, the United States Army Air Forces IX Engineer Command 825th Engineer Aviation Battalion cleared the field of mines and destroyed Luftwaffe aircraft. Coulommiers Airfield became a USAAF Ninth Air Force combat airfield, designated as "A-58" after about one week of reconstruction on 8 September, with two 6,000-foot concrete runways fully operational.

Under American control, the airfield was assigned to Ninth Air Force, with the following combat units assigned:

- 425th Night Fighter Squadron, 11 September – 13 October 1944 (Northrop P-61 Black Widow)
- 410th Bombardment Group, September 1944 – February 1945 (Douglas A-20 Havoc)

The combat unit then moved east along with the Allied lines and the airport became transport airfield, hosting Douglas C-47 Skytrains of the 437th Troop Carrier Group from February until the summer of 1945, after end of the war. The Americans returned full control of the airport to French authorities on 8 August 1945.

=== Postwar ===
After the war, the airfield was abandoned for a number of years, but remained in the hands of the French Air Ministry. During the 1950s, plans were made to use Coulommiers as an alternate for Le Bourget Airport. In addition, construction of two circular marguerite systems of aircraft hardstands was made in order to upgrade the airfield to NATO standards for possible military use. In 1960, a decision was made to reopen Orly Airport (then being a USAF base (Orly Air Base)) as a civil commercial airport and plans for the use of Coulommiers were discontinued.

== Accidents and incidents ==
- On 14 June 1948, SNCASE Languedoc P/7 F-BATG of Air France crashed at Coulommiers.

== Current ==
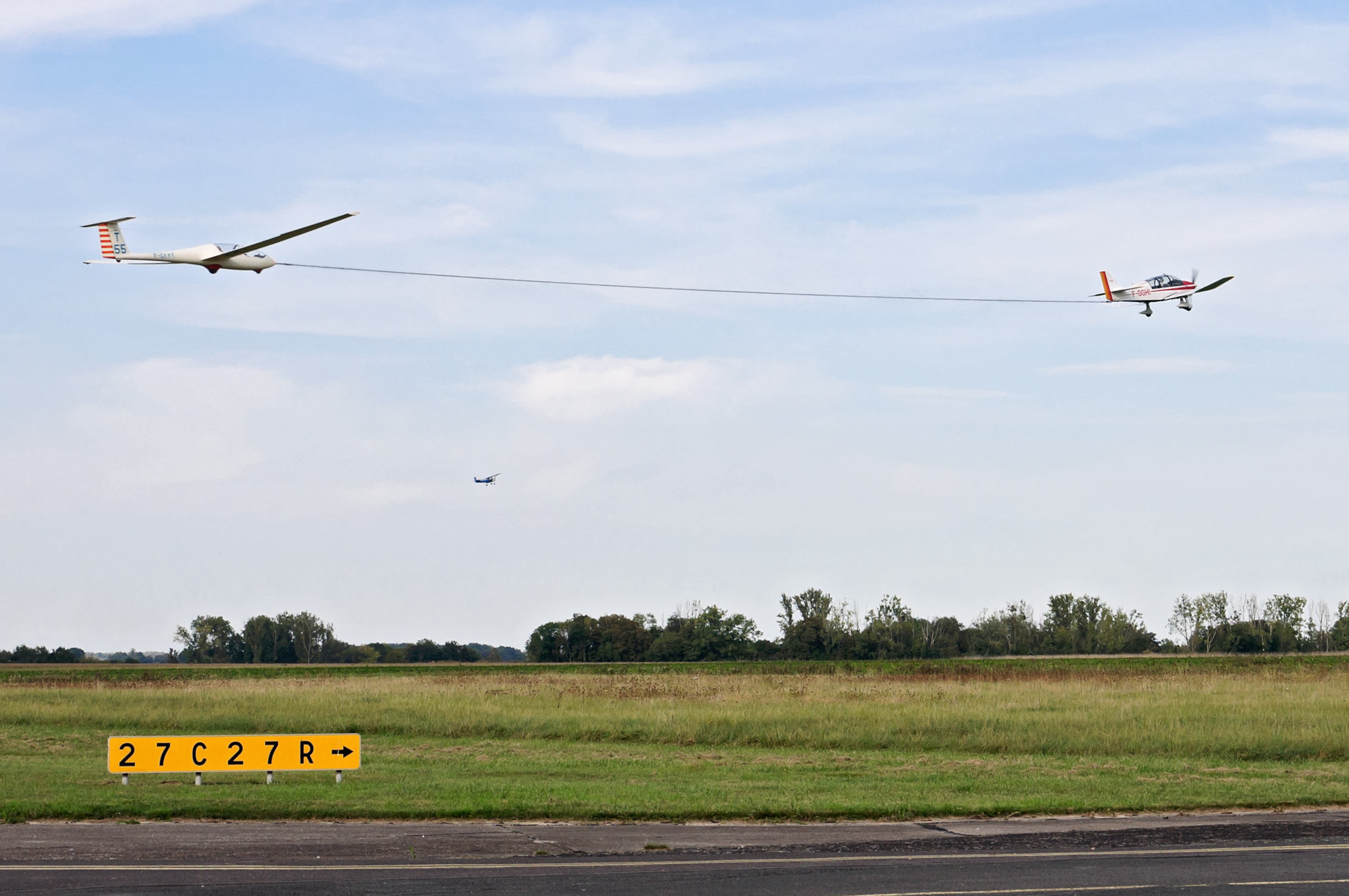
Robin DR400 towing a Grob G103a Twin II at Coulommiers – Voisins in 2011

In aerial photography the prewar French Air Force base is very evident with large numbers of wartime taxiways and both wartime runways still existing. Although over 70 years old, the concrete with expansion joints separating the poured sections are quite evident, but surprisingly well intact. Large numbers of Eighth Air Force bomb craters on both the 09/27 primary and the 04/22 secondary runways are quite evident by the concrete patches applied by the Air Force combat engineers in 1944. Numerous bomb craters are also in the grass areas around the marguerites and the former Luftwaffe dispersal area. In addition, it appears that the American combat engineers resurfaced a significant amount of taxiways and dispersal pads connected to the runways with Prefabricated Hessian Surfacing (PHS) which remains today, in a deteriorated state. The Luftwaffe expansion to the base remains intact, complete with dispersal revetments in the woods, and concrete taxiways. Numerous bomb craters are visible in the open areas around the woods.

Numerous wartime airfield buildings surround the airfield and what appears to be the prewar French Air Force barracks and support buildings appear to be in various states of disrepair with overgrown vegetation and very tall trees that once lined the roads in a neat, military manner. A large number of bomb craters appear in the remains, with some buildings being in use, probably as agricultural buildings. The communes of Giremoutiers and Corbeville are attached to this area.

The current airfield has been overlaid on the remains of the wartime airfield, with the main 09/27 runway 4,600 feet in length being a fresh asphalt overlay on the wartime concrete runway. An asphalt taxiway is also overlaid over a wartime taxiway, with modern hangars and a terminal on the south side of the airfield. Two short grass runways were constructed over the wartime airfield, used for gliders and light aircraft. Modern navigational aids are available and the facility is well maintained.

== See also ==
- Advanced Landing Ground
