= Hatbox Field =

Closed airport in Muskogee County, Oklahoma

Hatbox Field Hatbox Army Airfield
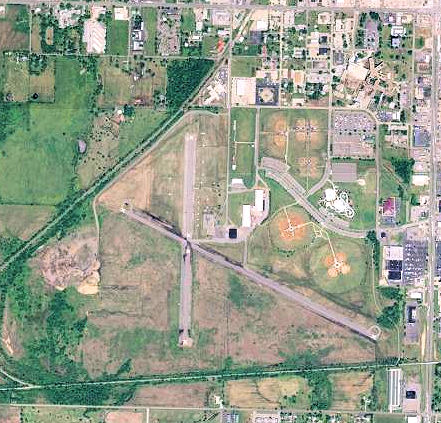
- USGS aerial image, 2006
- IATA: HAX; ICAO: KHAX; FAA LID: HAX

Summary
- Airport type: Public
- Owner: City of Muskogee
- Serves: Muskogee, Oklahoma
- Elevation AMSL: 627 ft (191 m)
- Coordinates: 35°44′45″N 95°24′46″W

Map
- Location of Hatbox Field (Closed)

Runways
Direction	Length		Surface
Direction	ft	m	Surface
11/29 CLOSED	3,800	1,158	Asphalt
- Source: Federal Aviation Administration

Hatbox Field (IATA: HAX, ICAO: KHAX, FAA LID: HAX) is a closed airfield located within city limits, two nautical miles (3.7 km) west of central Muskogee, a city in Muskogee County, Oklahoma, United States. It was opened sometime in the early 1920s and was closed in 2000. It is the location of the Love-Hatbox Sports Complex, a large recreation center and waterpark.

The former airfield site includes 10 lighted baseball fields‚ eight lighted softball diamonds‚ two full-size football fields and a 30 acre‚ 19-field soccer area called the Georgia Pacific Soccer Complex.

In addition‚ a 3.1-mile (5 km) asphalt Centennial Trail walking/biking exercise pathway loops around the 120 acres‚ and a former airplane hangar houses three indoor batting cages. Three Rivers Area Model Plane Society (T.R.A.M.P.S.), a local model airplane club, hosts two annual events at Love-Hatbox that attract flying enthusiasts from around the country.

== History ==
Hatbox Field was depicted on the 1929 Rand McNally "Standard Indexed Map with Air Trails of OK" as a public airport with a radio station. The airfield was Muskogee's original municipal airport, and is a very historic airfield. It is one of the airports that the Douglas aircraft of the Army's 1924 Around the World Flight stopped, and was a stop on the Army's mail route.

In 1929, the airfield was described as a municipal airport, operated by the Army Air Corps, and having a beacon light. Charles Lindbergh was on hand for the dedication.

The Spartan Aviation School opened at the field in 1940. They used the two large arch-roofed hangars at Hatbox. Renamed Muskogee Army Airfield during World War II, Spartan provided primary flight training to cadets as an Army Air Forces contract flying school until 1944. The USAAF 410th Bombardment Group trained at the airfield with Douglas A-20 Havocs in the fall of 1943 before being reassigned to the Ninth Air Force in England, where they flew Martin B-26 Marauders.

Following the end of its military use, Hatbox was reused as a purely civil airfield. The operator was listed as the City of Muskogee.

The city of Muskogee decided to close the field to the public following a two-fatality crash in 1998. Limited aviation use was allowed until 2000, however, by a private firm that refurbished military-surplus Beechcraft U-21 Utes. Hatbox was closed completely in 2000, and the refurbishing company moved to nearby Muskogee Davis Field.

== Facilities ==
Hatbox Field covered an area of 434 acres (176 ha) at an elevation of 627 feet (191 m) above mean sea level. It had one runway designated 11/29 with an asphalt surface measuring 3,800 by 50 feet (1,158 x 15 m).

== See also ==
- Oklahoma World War II Army Airfields
- List of United States Army airfields
- 31st Flying Training Wing (World War II)
