= Hesler-Noble Field =

Airport in Mississippi, US

Hesler-Noble Field (former Laurel Army Airfield)
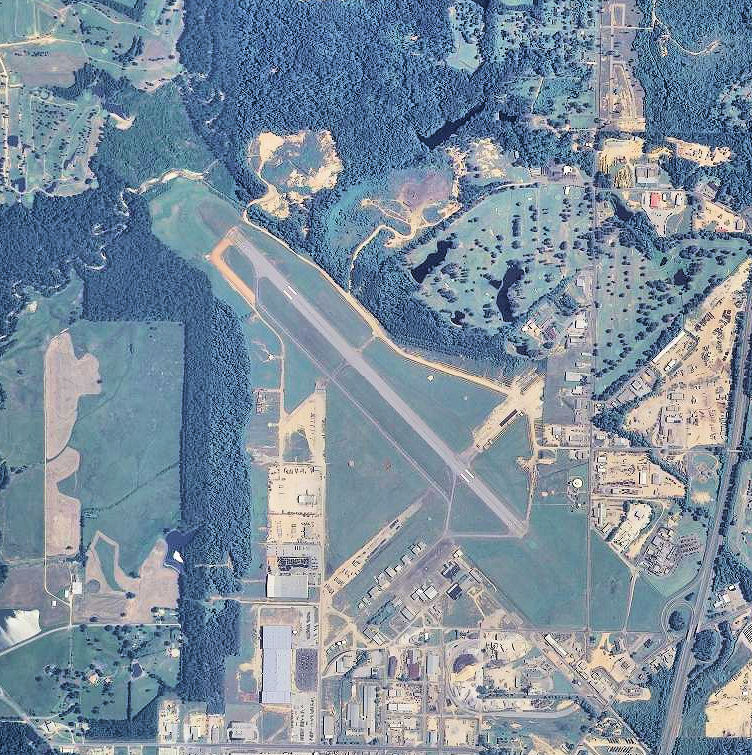
- USGS 2006 orthophoto
- IATA: LUL; ICAO: KLUL; FAA LID: LUL

Summary
- Airport type: Public
- Owner: Laurel Airport Authority
- Serves: Laurel, Mississippi
- Elevation AMSL: 238 ft (73 m)
- Coordinates: 31°40′23″N 89°10′22″W

Map
- Location in Mississippi LUL (the United States)

Runways
Direction	Length		Surface
Direction	ft	m	Surface
13/31	5,513	1,680	Asphalt

Statistics (2012)
- Aircraft operations: 22,975
- Based aircraft: 43
- Source: Federal Aviation Administration

Hesler-Noble Field (IATA: LUL, ICAO: KLUL, FAA LID: LUL) is a public airport in Jones County, Mississippi. It is owned by Laurel Airport Authority and is three miles southwest of Laurel, Mississippi.

The National Plan of Integrated Airport Systems for 2011–2015 called it a general aviation facility. It has no scheduled airline service.

== History ==
Laurel Airport opened in April, 1940, having been built by the Works Project Administration.

Alarmed by the fall of France in June 1940, Congress funded an increase from 29 to 54 combat groups in the United States Army Air Corps. The quickest way to get bases was to use existing civil airports. The Air Corps signed an agreement to lease Laurel Airport, but construction did not begin until mid 1942.

Construction involved runways and airplane hangars, with three concrete runways, several taxiways and a large apron and a control tower. Several large hangars were built. Buildings were utilitarian and quickly assembled. Most base buildings, not meant for long-term use, were built of temporary or semi-permanent materials. Although some hangars had steel frames and the occasional brick or tile brick building could be seen, most support buildings sat on concrete foundations but were of frame construction clad in little more than plywood and tarpaper. On December 18, 1942, Laurel Army Airfield opened, assigned to the Third Air Force. The 473d Base Headquarters and Air Base Squadron was host at the airfield.

Initially, the mission of the new Air Force field was to fly antisubmarine patrols over the Gulf of Mexico, with the 69th Observation Group flying the (Douglas O-38, Douglas O-46 and North American O-47) from November 1942 until March 1943.

In mid-1943 Laurel AAF's mission changed to training medium and light bomber crews (B-25 Mitchell, A-20 Havoc) and photo reconnaissance units for deployment overseas. Known units that trained at the airfield were:

- 71st Reconnaissance Group, March 31 - September 24, 1943
- 416th Bombardment Group, November 1943 - January 1, 1944
- 410th Bombardment Group, January - February 8, 1944

In early 1944, a phase down of training activity was begun, and plans were made to convert Laurel AAF into a specialized storage facility. Most activities at the airfield were moved to Jackson Army Air Base and Laurel was transferred to Air Technical Service Command on 1 July 1944. Large numbers of aircraft were sent to Laurel, both from other training bases, and later from returning overseas units after the War.

Excess aircraft were sent to reclamation facilities after being processed at Laurel. The airfield was placed on inactive status May 31, 1946 and returned to civil control.

Hesler-Noble Field returned to being a civil airport. The first airline flights were Southern DC-3s in 1951; the airlines moved to Hattiesburg-Laurel Regional Airport in May 1974.

== Facilities ==
Hesler-Noble Field covers 1,350 acres (546 ha) at an elevation of 238 feet (73 m). Its one runway, 13/31, is 5,513 by 150 feet (1,680 x 46 m) asphalt.

In the year ending April 19, 2012 the airport had 22,975 aircraft operations, average 62 per day: 95% general aviation and 5% military. 43 aircraft were then based at this airport: 58% single-engine, 21% multi-engine, 9% jet, 7% ultralight, and 5% helicopter.

A US Navy McDonnell Douglas T-45 Goshawk made a precautionary landing at Hesler-Noble Field on 12 April 2024 after an engine malfunction, following which all T-45 flights were paused.

== See also ==
- Mississippi World War II Army Airfields
- List of airports in Mississippi
