= Persan-Beaumont Airport =

Persan-Beaumont Airport Aérodrome de Persan - Beaumont
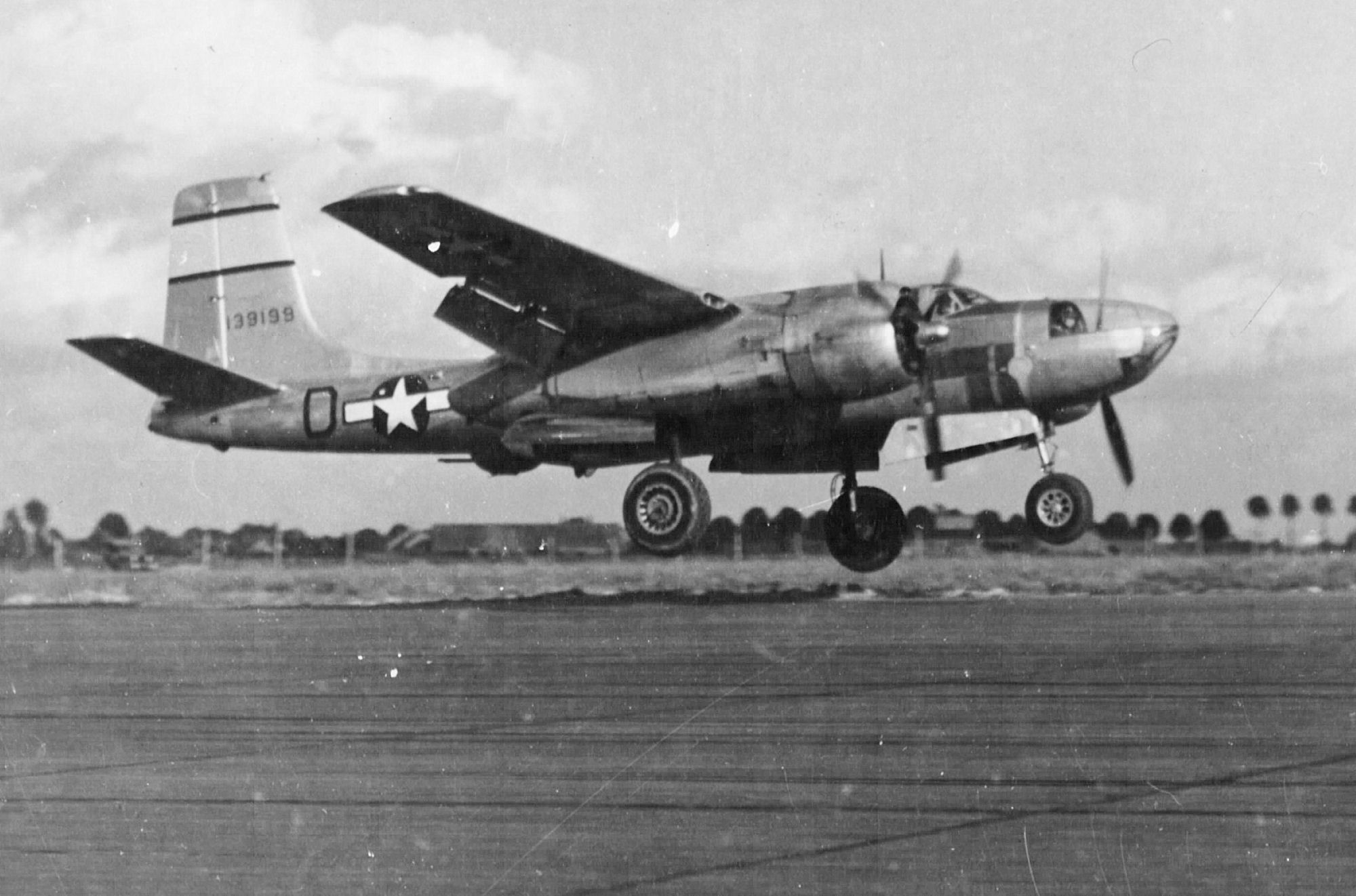
- A-26C-2-DL Invader 41-39199 553rd BS, 386th BG, 9th AF Beaumont-sur-Oise Airfield (A-60), France, 2 December 1944
- IATA: none; ICAO: LFPA

Summary
- Airport type: Public
- Operator: Aéroports de Paris
- Serves: Persan / Beaumont, France
- Elevation AMSL: 149 ft / 45 m
- Coordinates: 49°09′54″N 002°18′42″E

Map
- Location of Persan-Beaumont Airport

Runways
Direction	Length		Surface
Direction	m	ft	Surface
10L/28R	830	2,723	Asphalt
10R/28L	880	2,887	Grass
05/23	975	3,199	Grass
- Source: AIP France

Persan-Beaumont Airport (French: Aérodrome de Persan - Beaumont, ICAO: LFPA) is a regional airport in the Val-d'Oise department in Île-de-France in northern France. It is located 3 kilometres (2 mi) northeast of Beaumont-sur-Oise, 3 kilometres (2 mi) east-northeast of Persan, and 32 kilometres (20 mi) north of Paris. The airport supports general aviation with no commercial airline service scheduled.

== History ==
Beaumont Sur Oise was a pre-World War II French Air Force airfield with a 5,000-foot (1,500 m) concrete runway (05/23).

The airfield was seized by the Germans in June 1940 during the Battle of France. It was used by the Luftwaffe only sparingly, with Luftlandegeschwader 1 (LLG 1), a glider unit being assigned to the airfield between April and May 1943, equipped with Henschel Hs 126 liaison aircraft; Dornier Do 17s to pull the units DFS 230 transport gliders. Later, in November and December 1943, Schlachtgeschwader 4 (SLG 4) operated Focke-Wulf Fw 190F/Gs as a ground-attack unit.

Beaumont was attacked on several missions by the United States Army Air Forces Eighth Air Force and IX Bomber Command groups during 1943 and 1944.

The airfield was liberated by Allied ground forces about 3 September 1944 during the Northern France Campaign. Almost immediately, the United States Army Air Forces IX Engineering Command 818th Engineer Aviation Battalion cleared the airport of mines and destroyed Luftwaffe aircraft. Fortunately, little battle damage was sustained, and the airport became a USAAF Ninth Air Force combat airfield, designated as "A-60" about 26 September.

Under American control, the Ninth Air Force assigned the 386th Bombardment Group to the airport which flew Martin B-26 Marauder medium bombers from the facility between 2 October 1944 and 9 April 1945. The 386th was replaced by the 410th Bombardment Group, an Douglas A-26 Invader group, which operated from the airport until June 1945. The Americans returned full control of the airport to French authorities on 17 July 1945.

== Current ==
After the war, the airport appears to have been torn down, and a new facility constructed about 200m to the southeast. The wartime concrete runway remains in a field complete with many patches of bomb craters, connected to what appears to be the prewar French air base. At least one large hangar is still standing, and numerous support buildings. In addition, old taxiways reduced in width are being used as farm access roads.

== Facilities ==
The airport resides at an elevation of 149 feet (45 m) above mean sea level. It has three runways: 10L/28R is paved and measures 830 by 20 metres (2,723 ft × 66 ft), 10R/28L is a parallel grass runway measuring 880 by 90 metres (2,887 ft × 295 ft), and 05/23 has a grass surface measuring 975 by 100 metres (3,199 ft × 328 ft).

== See also ==
- Advanced Landing Ground
