= RAF Birch =

Defunct airbase in Essex, England

RAF Birch USAAF Station 149
- Near Birch, Essex in England
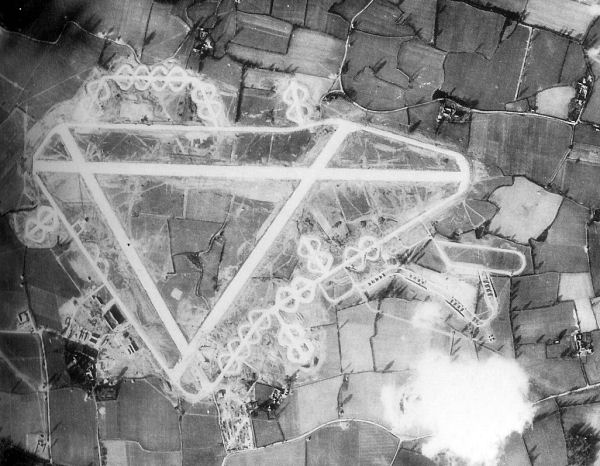
- RAF Birch during World War II, September 1944. The fully completed airfield was essentially never used by the Allies.

Site information
- Type: Royal Air Force station
- Owner: Air Ministry
- Operator: Royal Air Force; United States Army Air Forces
- Controlled by: RAF Transport Command; Ninth Air Force

Location
- Shown within Essex RAF Birch (the United Kingdom)
- Coordinates: 51°50′33″N 000°46′50″E

Site history
- Built: 1944
- In use: 1944-1945

Airfield information
- Elevation: 42 metres (138 ft) AMSL
Runways
Direction	Length and surface
02/20	1,300 metres (4,265 ft) Concrete
08/26	1,800 metres (5,906 ft) Concrete
14/32	1,300 metres (4,265 ft) Concrete

Royal Air Force Birch or more simply RAF Birch is a former Royal Air Force station in Essex, England. The airfield is located 2 miles (3.2 km) northeast of Tiptree.

Opened in 1942, it was used by both the Royal Air Force and United States Army Air Forces. During the war it was used primarily as a reserve transport airfield. It was closed after the war, in late 1945.

Today, the remains of the airfield are located on private property in agricultural use.

== Royal Air Force use ==
The following units were here at some point:

- No. 48 Squadron RAF
- No. 233 Squadron RAF
- No. 381 Maintenance Unit RAF
- No. 382 Maintenance Unit RAF
- No. 383 Maintenance Unit RAF
- No. 384 Maintenance Unit RAF

== United States Army Air Forces use ==
Birch was known by the USAAF as USAAF Station AAF-149 for security reasons and was referred to as such, instead of by location. Its USAAF Station Code was "BR".

== Current use ==
After release from military control, the airfield was returned to agricultural use.

Today, most of the concreted areas have been removed for hardcore, leaving single-tracked farm roads along the main runway, one secondary runway, and parts of the perimeter track. Blind Lane (a public road) now runs along the other secondary runway (02/20), its original course having been displaced when the airfield was built. Some hardstanding is used by Essex Council for garden waste composting, the main site being accessed via the main runway. A few loop hardstands remain intact, off the remains of the single-tracked perimeter track along the north side of the airfield. However, other than these farm roads, there is little remaining of a wartime airfield that was never used, other than some ghostly disturbed areas visible in aerial photography. These represent loop dispersal hardstands and the long-since-removed perimeter track.

== See also ==
- List of former Royal Air Force stations
