= 923d Expeditionary Air Refueling Flight =

923d Expeditionary Air Refueling Flight

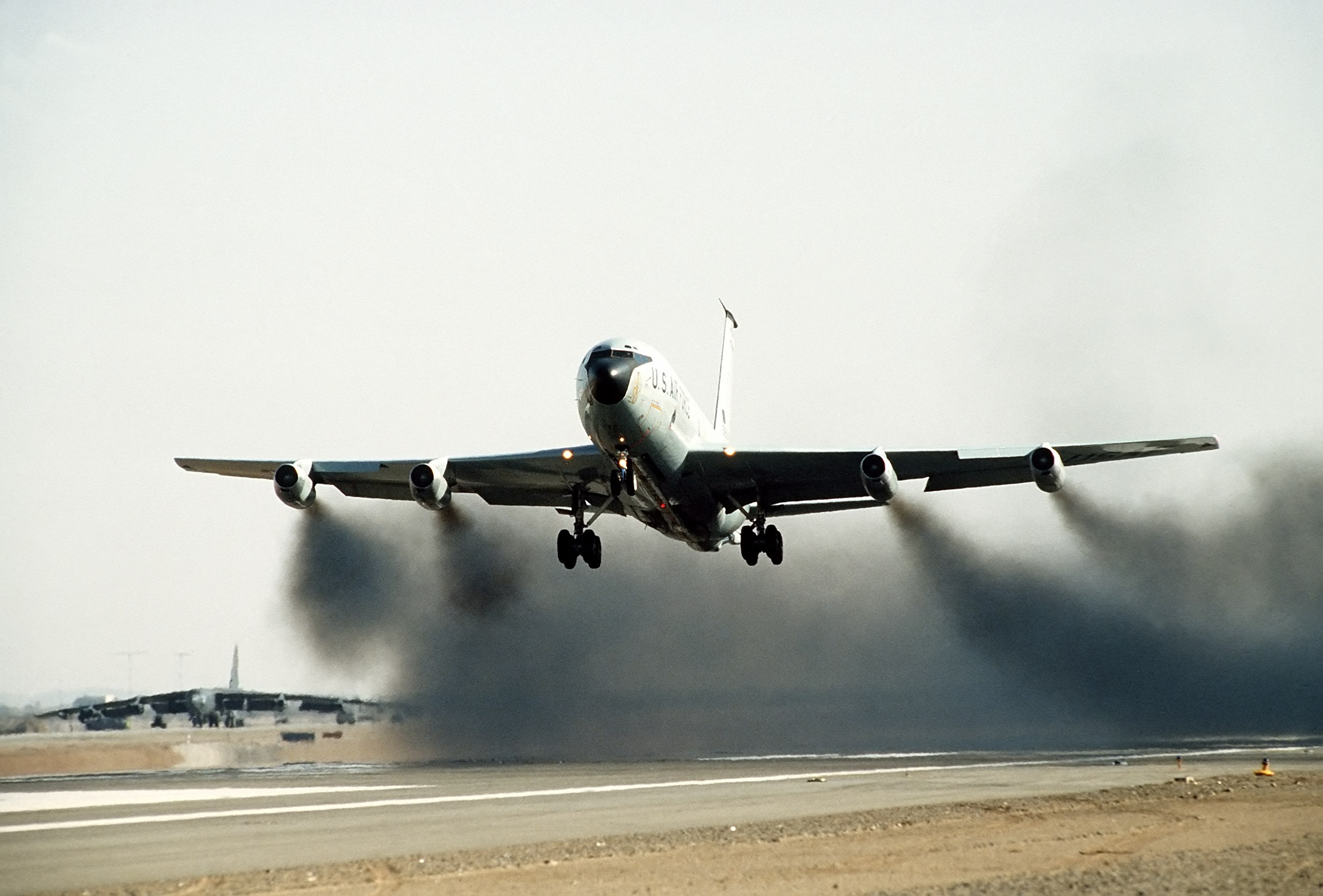
- Boeing KC-135A on takeoff
- Active: 1942–1943; 1954–1955; 1960–1961;
- Country: United States
- Branch: United States Air Force
- Role: Air refueling
- Part of: Air Mobility Command

The 923d Expeditionary Air Refueling Flight is a provisional United States Air Force unit, assigned to Air Combat Command to activate or inactivate as needed.

The squadron was first activated during World War II as the 23d Air Corps Ferrying Squadron at Morrison Field, Florida in 1942. In October 1943 the squadron and its parent group were disbanded and replaced as the Air Transport Command unit at Morrison by Station 11, Caribbean Wing, Air Transport Command.

The squadron was reconstituted in 1954 as the 23d Air Transport Squadron, Medium, a Douglas C-54 Skymaster unit, at Charleston Air Force Base, South Carolina. The squadron was inactivated in 1955.

The 923d Air Refueling Squadron operated Boeing KC-135 Stratotankers at K. I. Sawyer Air Force Base, Michigan from 1960 to 1961, when its mission, personnel and equipment were transferred to the 46th Air Refueling Squadron.

In September 1985, the 923d and 23d squadrons were consolidated into a single squadron. The 923d was converted to provisional status as the 923d Expeditionary Air Refueling Flight and assigned to Air Mobility Command to activate or inactivate as needed.

== History ==
=== Airlift operations ===
The squadron was first activated during World War II as the 23d Air Corps Ferrying Squadron at Morrison Field, Florida in 1942. The squadron ferried aircraft between Florida and points in western Africa. From 1943, the unit then focused on the air transportation mission as the 23d Transport Squadron. Although the squadron was stationed at Morrison, its personnel were also used to man other stations of the Caribbean Wing. After a little more than a year of trying to use traditional Table of Organization units like the 23d, Air Transport Command (ATC) found them too inflexible for its operations. It, therefore, decided to replace its groups and squadrons and assign personnel directly to each of its stations, based on the needs of the station. Accordingly, in October 1943 the squadron and its parent group were disbanded as ATC combined its units at Morrison into Station 11, Caribbean Wing, Air Transport Command.

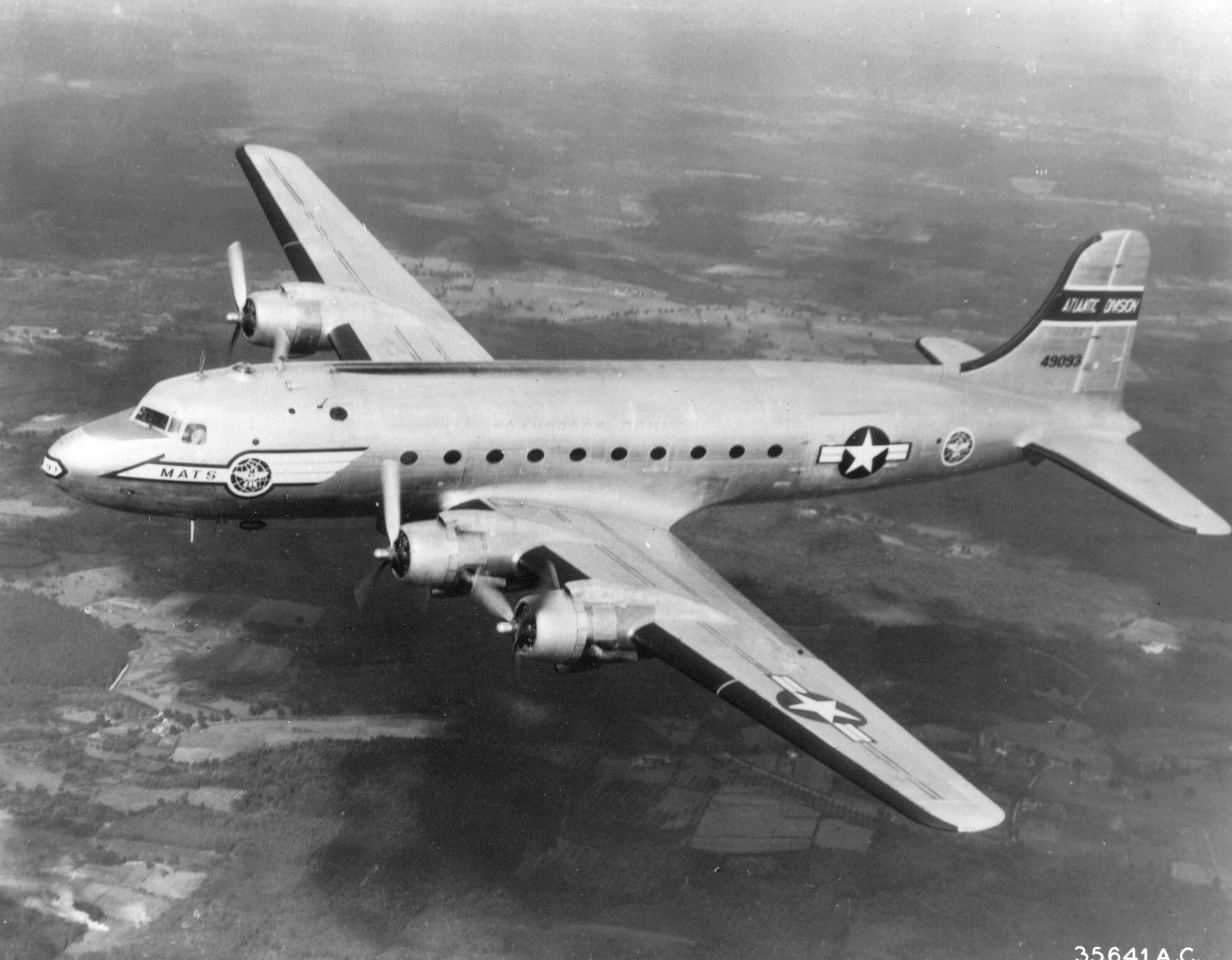
MATS C-54 Skymaster

The squadron was reactivated in March 1954 at Charleston Air Force Base, South Carolina as the 23d Air Transport Squadron with the responsibility of transporting personnel, material, mail and other strategic cargo for the Army, Navy and civilian agencies. The squadron was assigned to the 1608th Air Transport Group, which had been activated two months earlier. However, shortages of personnel and equipment delayed the group from reaching operational status upon activation. The squadron operated Douglas C-54 Skymaster aircraft, flying missions to Europe and North Africa until inactivating in July 1955.

=== Air refueling operations ===
The 923d Air Refueling Squadron was activated on 1 May 1960 by Strategic Air Command (SAC) at K. I. Sawyer Air Force Base, Michigan, where it was assigned to the 4042d Strategic Wing. The 4042d wing was established by SAC in a program to disperse its Boeing B-52 Stratofortress bombers over a larger number of bases, thus making it more difficult for the Soviet Union to knock out the entire fleet with a surprise first strike. SAC bases with large concentrations of bombers made attractive targets. SAC's response was to break up its wings and scatter their aircraft over a larger number of bases. The squadron was initially nominally manned, but it received its first Boeing KC-135 Stratotanker on 5 August.

The squadron provided air refueling support to USAF units as directed. (Note: The squadron transferred its personnel and equipment to the 46th Air Refueling Squadron before the 4042d wing's Boeing B-52 Stratofortress squadron was activated.) The squadron became fully operationally ready by March 1961 and one third of the squadron's aircraft were maintained on fifteen-minute alert, fully fueled and ready for combat to reduce vulnerability to a Soviet missile strike.

The squadron inactivated a little less than a year after being activated when its personnel, equipment and aircraft were transferred to the 46th Air Refueling Squadron. In 1985 the 23d Air Transport Squadron and the 923d Air Refueling Squadron were consolidated into a single unit. In 2004, the squadron was redesignated the 923d Expeditionary Air Refueling Flight and assigned to Air Mobility Command as a provisional unit to activate or inactivate as needed.

== Lineage ==
23d Air Transport Squadron

- Constituted on 6 April 1942 as the 23d Air Corps Ferrying Squadron

Activated on 21 July 1942
Redesignated 23d Transport Squadron on 29 March 1943
Disbanded on 13 October 1943

- Reconstituted on 27 November 1953 and redesignated 23d Air Transport Squadron, Medium

Activated on 8 March 1954
Inactivated on 1 July 1955
Consolidated with the 923d Air Refueling Squadron on 19 September 1985 as the 923d Air Refueling Squadron

923d Expeditionary Air Refueling Flight

- Constituted as the 923d Air Refueling Squadron, Heavy on 16 December 1959

Activated on 1 May 1960
Inactivated on 1 April 1961
Consolidated with the 23d Air Transport Squadron on 19 September 1985

- Converted to provisional status and redesignated 923d Expeditionary Air Refueling Flight on 29 September 2004

=== Assignments ===
- 15th Ferrying Group (later 15th Transport Group): 21 July 1942 – 13 October 1943
- 1608th Air Transport Group: 8 March 1954 – 1 July 1955
- 4042d Strategic Wing: 1 May 1960 – 1 April 1961

=== Stations ===
- Morrison Field, Florida, 3 April 1942 – 13 October 1943
- Charleston Air Force Base, South Carolina, 8 March 1954 – 18 March 1955
- K. I. Sawyer Air Force Base, Michigan, 1 December 1959 – 30 September 1975

=== Aircraft ===
- Douglas C-54 Skymaster, 1954–1958
- Boeing KC-135 Stratotanker, 1960–1961

=== Awards and campaigns ===
Campaign Streamer	Campaign	Dates	Notes
	American Theater without inscription	3 April 1942 – 13 October 1943	23d Ferrying Squadron (later 23d Transport Squadron)

== See also ==
- Air Transport Command
- List of United States Air Force air refueling squadrons
