= 484th Fighter-Interceptor Squadron =

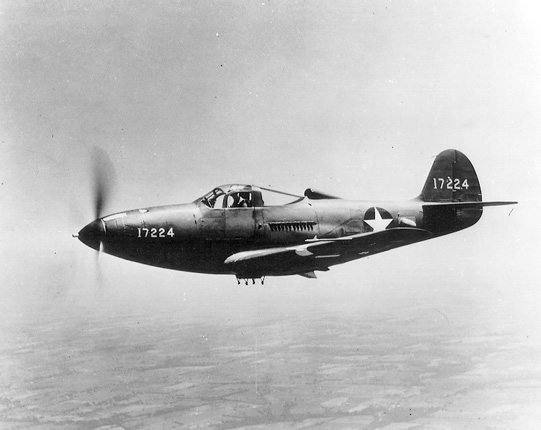
- P-39 Airacobra, type flown by the squadron
- Active: 1943–1944; 1956–1959
- Country: United States
- Branch: United States Air Force
- Role: Fighter interceptor

The 484th Fighter-Interceptor Squadron is an inactive United States Air Force unit. Its last assignment was with the 473d Fighter Group at K. I. Sawyer Air Force Base, Michigan, where it was inactivated on 16 February 1959. During world War II, the squadron was activated as a Replacement Training Unit, but was replaced by another unit before becoming became operational.

== History ==
=== World War II ===
The squadron was activated as the 484th Fighter Squadron in November 1943 at Grand Central Air Terminal, California, forming one of the three original squadrons of the 473d Fighter Group, The squadron was intended to become a Lockheed P-38 Lightning Replacement Training Unit. Replacement training units were oversized units which trained aircrews prior to their deployment to combat theaters. However, the squadron operated Bell P-39 Airacobras and other aircraft, and never became operational with P-38s.

The squadron moved to Ephrata Army Air Base, Washington at the end of March 1944, along with other elements of the 473d Group. The Army Air Forces (AAF) found that standard military units like the 484th, whose manning was based on relatively inflexible tables of organization were proving not well adapted to the training mission, even more so to the replacement mission. Accordingly, the AAF adopted a more functional system in which each base was organized into a separate numbered unit. Upon arrival at Ephrata, the squadron was disbanded and its personnel used to form part of the cadre of the 430th AAF Base Unit (Replacement Training Unit, Fighter, Single Engine).

=== Cold War air defense ===
The 473d Fighter Group was activated again in 1956 by Air Defense Command to open K. I. Sawyer Air Force Base, and the 484th Fighter-Interceptor Squadron was activated as its operational squadron, authorized Northrop F-89 Scorpion aircraft. However, the squadron never received its aircraft and was inactivated before the runways at K.I. Sawyer were ready to receive operational aircraft. The 473d Group was replaced by the 56th Fighter Group in 1959 as the host and operational unit at K.I. Sawyer.

== Lineage ==
- Constituted as the 484th Fighter Squadron (Two Engine) on 12 October 1943

Activated on 1 November 1943
Disbanded on 31 March 1944

- Reconstituted and redesignated 484th Fighter-Interceptor Squadron on 15 November 1955

Activated on 8 June 1956
Inactivated on 16 February 1959

=== Assignments ===
- 473d Fighter Group, November 1943-31 March 1944
- 473d Fighter Group, 8 June 1956 – 16 February 1959

=== Stations ===
- Grand Central Air Terminal, California, 1 November 1943
- Ephrata Army Air Base, Washington, 31 March 1944
- K. I. Sawyer Air Force Base, Michigan, 8 June 1956 – 16 February 1959

=== Aircraft ===
- Cessna AT-17 Bobcat, 1944
- Curtiss A-25 Shrike, 1944
- Bell P-39 Airacobra, 1944
