= Los Angeles Fighter Wing =

- Active: 1942–1944
- Country: United States
- Branch: United States Army; United States Air Force (Note: When the United States Air Force became a separate service in September 1947, all former Army Air Forces units, including disbanded units were transferred to its control.)
- Role: Command and training of fighter units
- Engagements: World War II

The Los Angeles Fighter Wing was a unit of the United States Army Air Forces. The wing provided air defense of southern California and trained fighter units and pilots. It was stationed at Los Angeles, California, where it was disbanded on 7 June 1944.

== History ==
Along the Pacific coast, Western Defense Command established a "vital air defense zone", extending from the coast approximately 150 miles (240 km) inland and 200 miles (320 km) to sea. To carry out this mission, Fourth Air Force organized regional air defense wings in August 1942. The Los Angeles Air Defense Wing was organized to provide air defense for the Los Angeles area and train fighter groups and pilots.

The Army Air Forces later found that standard military units like the wing, whose manning was based on relatively inflexible tables of organization were not well adapted to the training mission, even more so to the replacement mission. Accordingly, the Army Air Forces adopted a more functional system in which each base was organized into a separate numbered unit, with similar flexible units established for headquarters.

In this reorganization, the wing's headquarters squadron was replaced by the 410th AAF Base Unit (Fighter Wing) on 1 April 1944. The wing itself was disbanded on 7 July 1944, and the 410th was redescribed as the 410th AAF Base Unit (Air Defense Region). In 1946, it became the 410th AAF Base Unit (Los Angeles Control Group), and was discontinued on 1 January 1947.

== Lineage ==
- Constituted as the Los Angeles Air Defense Wing on 6 August 1942

Activated on 11 August 1942
Redesignated Los Angeles Fighter Wing c. 2 July 1943
Disbanded 7 June 1944

=== Assignments ===
- IV Fighter Command, 11 August 1942
- Fourth Air Force, 31 March – 7 June 1944

=== Components ===
- 20th Fighter Group: 1 January – 11 August 1943
- 329th Fighter Group, 12 April 1943 – 1 March 1944
- 360th Fighter Group: 15 January 1943 – 31 March 1944
- 364th Fighter Group: 11 October 1943 – 11 January 1944
- 412th Fighter Group: 30 November 1943 – 11 October 1944 (Note: However, Robertson indicates the group was assigned directly to IV Fighter Command until March 1944, then directly to Fourth Air Force. Robertson, Patsy (May 2012). "Factsheet 412 Test Wing (AFMC)". Air Force Historical Research Agency.)
- 473d Fighter Group: 1 November 1943 – 31 March 1944
- 474th Fighter Group: 11 October 1943 – 6 February 1944
- 479th Fighter Group, 1 November 1943 – 15 May 1944

=== Station ===
- Los Angeles, California, 11 August 1942 – 7 June 1944
