= Wurtsmith Air Museum =

- Location within Michigan
- Former name: Wurtsmith Division (of the Yankee Air Force)
- Established: 8 December 1993
- Location: Oscoda, Michigan
- Coordinates: 44.4586°N 83.3576°W
- Type: Aviation museum
- Founder: James McLaughlin
- Website: www.wurtsmithairmuseum.net

The Wurtsmith Air Museum is an aviation museum located at Oscoda–Wurtsmith Airport in Oscoda, Michigan focused on the history of Wurtsmith Air Force Base and aviation in northeastern Michigan.

== History ==
=== Establishment ===
Following the end of the Cold War, the U.S. Air Force announced the closure of a number of air force bases in Michigan. This led to efforts to found aviation museums at the former bases such as the K. I. Sawyer Heritage Air Museum. A group at Wurtsmith Air Force Base partnered with the Yankee Air Force to establish as the Wurtsmith Division on 8 December 1993. It opened in 1997 in three hangars at the base. (Note: Plans to locate another museum, a branch of the National Korean War Museum, in a former headquarters at the airport were announced in 2004.)

=== Independence ===
By July 2012, the museum had separated from the Yankee Air Force and become the Wurtsmith Air Museum.

The museum received the navigators seat from a B-52 in 2020.

The museum opened three new exhibits in 2023.

The museum unveiled a restored L-19 in July 2025.

== Exhibits ==
Exhibits at the museum cover subjects such as women in aviation, General Paul Wurtsmith, 920th Air Refueling Squadron, the Army Air Service and a Link Trainer.

== Collection ==
- Baker Special
- Cessna L-19A Bird Dog
- Jeffair Barracuda
- Lockheed T-33A
- Lockheed T-33A
- Osprey Osprey II
- Piper L-4 Grasshopper
- Rand KR-2
- Royal Aircraft Factory S.E.5 – 3/4 scale replica
- Sperry Messenger – 1/2 scale replica
- Waco CG-4

== See also ==
- K. I. Sawyer Heritage Air Museum
- List of aviation museums
