= 46th Air Refueling Squadron =

US Air Force unit

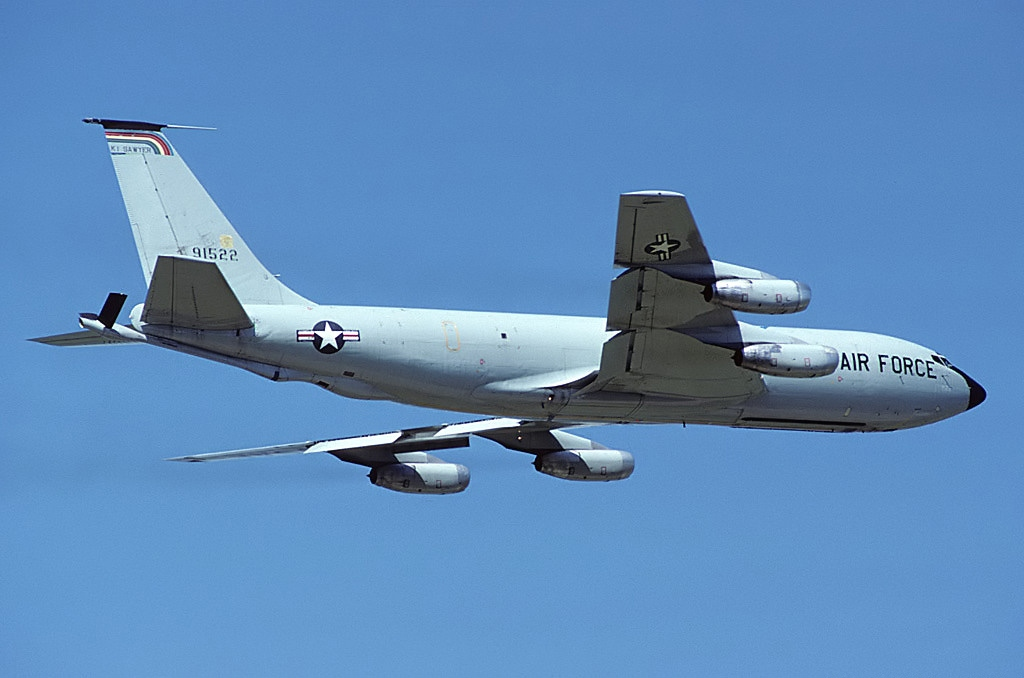
- Squadron KC-135A Stratotanker
- Active: 1942–1943; 1954–1956; 1961–1996
- Country: United States
- Branch: United States Air Force
- Role: Aerial refueling
- Engagements: Mediterranean Theater of Operations

Insignia
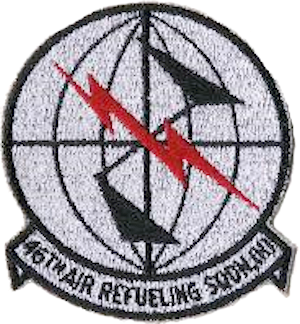
- Patch with 46th Air Refueling Squadron emblem

The 46th Air Refueling Squadron is an inactive United States Air Force unit. It was last assigned to the 410th Operations Group, at K. I. Sawyer Air Force Base, Michigan, where it was inactivated on 8 October 1993.

== History ==
The 46th Ferrying Squadron, Air Transport Command, was activated on 2 December 1942 at Wadi Seidna Airport, Anglo-Egyptian Sudan. The 46th was assigned to the 13th Ferrying Group which was responsible for a region spanning El Geneine, Anglo-Egyptian Sudan, to Karachi, India (now Pakistan), and from Cairo, Egypt, to Tehran, Iran. The 46th was responsible for the aerial transportation of personnel, supplies and mail throughout this area.

The squadron was redesignated the 46th Transport Squadron on 24 March 1943. With the reorganization of the Africa Middle East Wing, the 46th was disbanded on 30 September 1943 when the group and squadron organizations of the Central African Sector were disbanded and replaced by stations. The 13th Transport Group, its assigned squadrons, and all personnel and equipment were absorbed by the newly created Station 20, Africa Middle East Wing at Khartoum.

Reconstituted and redesignated the 46th Air Transport Squadron, Medium, Military Air Transport Service (MATS). The 46th began operations at Kelly Air Force Base, Texas in July 1954. The 46th operated primarily as a training squadron until April 1955, at which time it became a full strength squadron. The primary mission of the 46th was to provide air movement of personnel and supplies over almost two-thirds of the globe as designated by higher headquarters. The secondary mission was to train new MATS personnel and to make them an integral part of the squadron. The 46th Air Transport Squadron inactivated on 8 April 1956.

When the 923d Air Refueling Squadron was discontinued and inactivated on 1 April 1961, the 46th Air Refueling Squadron, Heavy was organized and gained the mission, personnel, and equipment of the 923rd. Stationed at K.I. Sawyer Air Force Base, Michigan the 46th flew regular, reflex, alert, and training refueling missions; its tankers refueled Tactical Air Command fighters being deployed or rotated overseas, and those returning to the United States.

Aircrews of the 46th were deployed to assist in refueling operations during the Cuban Missile Crisis; it also sent aircraft and crews to Southeast Asia to support combat missions of SAC bombers and TAC fighters. The 46th deployed aircraft and crews for tanker task forces operating out of Alaska, Spain, Labrador, and in the Great Lakes region. The squadron maintained operational readiness to conduct air refueling operations with the Boeing KC-135A Stratotanker as specified by higher headquarters until its inactivation.

Inactivated in 1993 as part of the post Cold War drawdown of the USAF and inactivation of the parent 410th Bombardment Wing and closure of K. I. Sawyer.

== Lineage ==
- Constituted as the 46th Ferrying Squadron on 1 December 1942

Activated on 2 December 1942
Redesignated 46th Transport Squadron on 24 March 1943
Disbanded on 30 September 1943

- Reconstituted as the 46th Air Transport Squadron, Medium

Activated on 1 July 1954
Inactivated on: 8 April 1956

- Redesignated 46th Air Refueling Squadron, Heavy and activated (not organized)

Organized on 1 April 1961
Inactivated on 8 October 1993

=== Assignments ===
- 13th Ferrying Group, 2 December 1942 – 30 September 1943
- 1700th Air Transport Group, 1 July 1954 – 8 April 1956
- 4042d Strategic Wing, 1 April 1961
- 410th Bombardment Wing, 1 February 1963
- 410th Operations Group, 1 September 1991 – 1 June 1992

305th Operations Group, 1 June 1992 – 8 October 1993

=== Stations ===
- Wadi Seidna Airport, Anglo-Egyptian Sudan, 2 December 1942 – 30 September 1943 15°48′57″N 032°30′55″E
- Kelly Air Force Base, Texas, 1 July 1954 – 8 April 1956
- K. I. Sawyer Air Force Base, Michigan, 1 April 1961 – 8 October 1993 (detached to Grissom Air Force Base, Indiana after 1 June 1992)

=== Aircraft ===
- Douglas C-54 Skymaster, 1942–1943, 1954–1956
- Boeing KC-135 Stratotanker, 1960–1993
