= 473rd Fighter Group =

473d Fighter Group

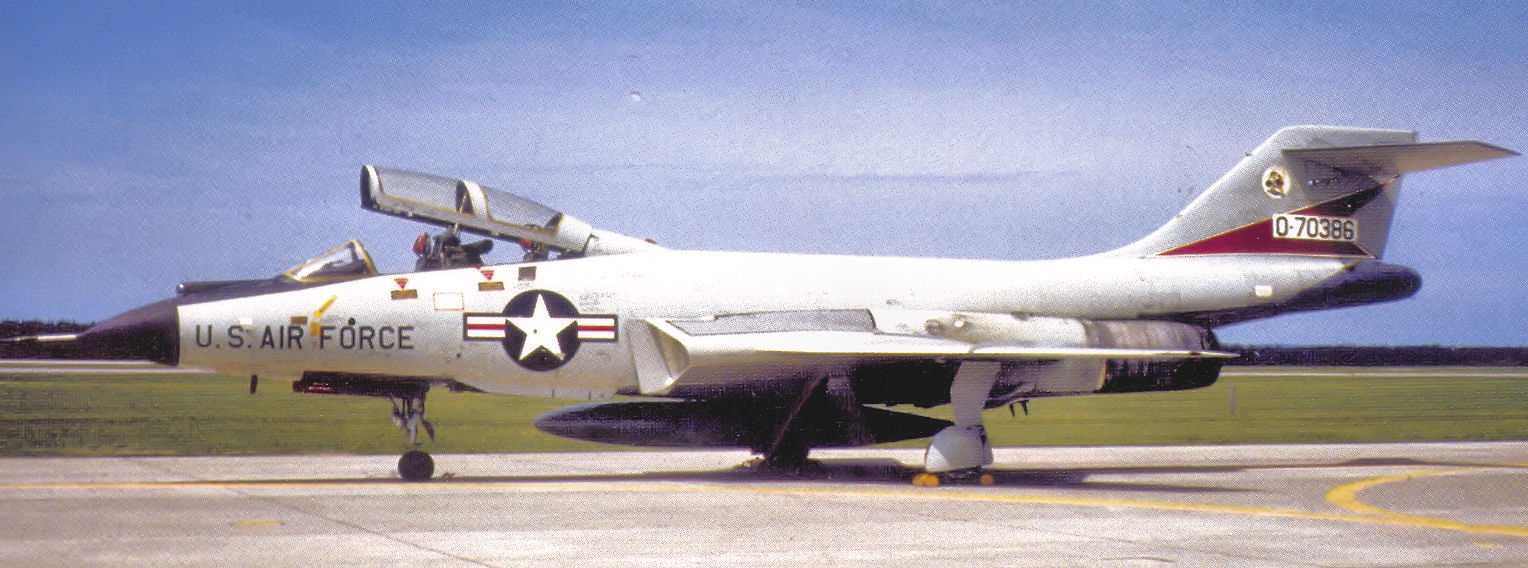
- 62d Fighter-Interceptor Squadron F-101B Voodoo 57-0386 at K.I. Sawyer AFB
- Active: 1942–1944; 1956–1959
- Country: United States
- Branch: United States Air Force
- Type: Fighter
- Role: Air Defense
- Part of: Air Defense Command

The 473d Fighter Group is an inactive United States Air Force (USAF) unit. Its last assignment was with the 30th Air Division at K. I. Sawyer Air Force Base, Michigan, where it was inactivated on 30 September 1959.

During World War II, the unit was programmed as a replacement training unit for P-38 Lightning pilots but never became operational. It was disbanded in a general reorganization of the Army Air Forces into base units to make more efficient use of manpower.

The group was reactivated as the 473d Fighter Group (Air Defense) in the spring of 1956 during the Cold War under Air Defense Command. The group opened K.I. Sawyer for use by the USAF, and after 1959 was responsible for air defense in the upper midwestern United States. Its mission, personnel and equipment were transferred to the 56th Fighter Group (Air Defense) in 1959 and the group was inactivated.

== History ==
=== World War II ===
The 473d Fighter Group was activated at Grand Central Air Terminal, California in late 1943. It was originally assigned the 482d, 483d and 484th Fighter Squadrons. A month later the 451st Fighter Squadron was activated and assigned to the group. The group was a Replacement Training Unit equipped primarily with Lockheed P-38 Lightnings, but its squadrons flew a variety of aircraft. Replacement training units were oversized units which trained aircrews prior to their deployment to combat theaters.

However, at the time the 473d was being organized, the Army Air Forces found that standard military units, based on relatively inflexible tables of organization, were proving less well adapted to the training mission. Accordingly, it adopted a more functional system in which each base was organized into a separate numbered unit. In the final days of March 1944, the group and three of its squadrons moved to Ephrata Army Air Base, Washington, while the 482d squadron moved to Moses Lake Army Air Field, Washington. The group and squadrons acting as RTUs were then disbanded. The units at Ephrata were combined into the 430th AAF Base Unit (Fighter Replacement Training Unit-Single Engine). The 482d formed the basis for the 431st AAF Base Unit.

=== Air Defense in the 1950s ===
The group was reactivated in April 1956 during the Cold War by Air Defense Command to open K. I. Sawyer Air Force Base, Michigan. The 473d was initially assigned to the 4710th Air Defense Wing. The group was the host for all USAF organizations at K.I. Sawyer and was assigned several support organizations to fulfill this responsibility. In July, the 4710th wing was discontinued and the group was assigned directly to the 37th Air Division. The operational squadron assigned to the group was the 484th Fighter-Interceptor Squadron, which was authorized Northrop F-89 Scorpion aircraft. However, these aircraft were not delivered before the squadron was inactivated in February 1959 and the squadron did not become operational. In fact, it was 1959 before the K.I. Sawyer runway was completed and ready to accept modern aircraft.

In August 1958, the group became host to a Strategic Air Command wing, the 4042d Strategic Wing. Although the 4042d was initially activated as a headquarters only, it would be the framework for a forward based Boeing B-52 Stratofortress equipped bombardment wing. The following August, the 62d Fighter-Interceptor Squadron moved to K.I. Sawyer, was attached to the wing, and equipped with McDonnell F-101 Voodoos. The squadron had moved from O'Hare International Airport, where there was local resistance to maintaining a regular USAF presence at one of the world's busiest civilian airports. Security for the Voodoo's nuclear armed MB-1 Genie at a civilian location was also a concern. Two months after the arrival of the 62d, its parent group, the 56th Fighter Group and its support units moved on paper from O'Hare to K.I. Sawyer and assumed the mission, personnel and equipment of the 473d, which was inactivated.

== Lineage ==
- Constituted as the 473d Fighter Group on 12 October 1943

Activated on 1 November 1943
Disbanded on 31 March 1944

- Reconstituted and redesignated 473d Fighter Group (Air Defense) on 8 July 1955

Activated on 8 April 1956
Inactivated on 30 September 1959

- Redesignated 473d Tactical Fighter Group on 31 July 1985

=== Assignments ===
- IV Fighter Command (attached to Los Angeles Fighter Wing), 1 November 1943 – 31 March 1944
- 4710th Air Defense Wing, 8 April 1956
- 37th Air Division, 8 July 1956
- 30th Air Division, 1 April 1959 – 1 October 1959

=== Components ===
Operational squadrons

- 62d Fighter-Interceptor Squadron, (attached 1 August 1959 – 30 September 1959)
- 451st Fighter Squadron: 1 December 1943 – 31 March 1944

At March Field, California until 6 December 1943

- 482d Fighter Squadron: 1 November 1943 – 31 March 1944

At Moses Lake Army Air Field 31 March 1944

- 483d Fighter Squadron: 1 November 1943 – 31 March 1944
- 484th Fighter Squadron (later Fighter-Interceptor Squadron): 1 November 1943 – 31 March 1944; 8 June 1956 – 16 February 1959

Support units

- 473d USAF Infirmary (later 473d USAF Dispensary), 8 April 1956 – 30 September 1959
- 473d Air Base Squadron, 8 April 1956 – 30 September 1959
- 473d Consolidated Aircraft Maintenance Squadron, 8 July 1957 – 30 September 1959
- 473d Materiel Squadron, 8 April 1956 – 30 September 1959

=== Stations ===
- Grand Central Air Terminal, California, 1 November 1943
- Ephrata Army Air Base, Washington, 28 March 1944 – 31 March 1944
- K. I. Sawyer Air Force Base, Michigan, 8 April 1956 – 1 October 1959

=== Aircraft ===
- Curtiss A-25 Shrike, 1944
- Lockheed B-34, 1943–1944
- Cessna UC-78 Bobcat, 1943–1944
- Lockheed P-38 Lightning, 1944
- Bell P-39 Airacobra, 1944
- McDonnell F-101 Voodoo, 1959

== See also ==
- Aerospace Defense Command Fighter Squadrons
