= K. I. Sawyer Heritage Air Museum =

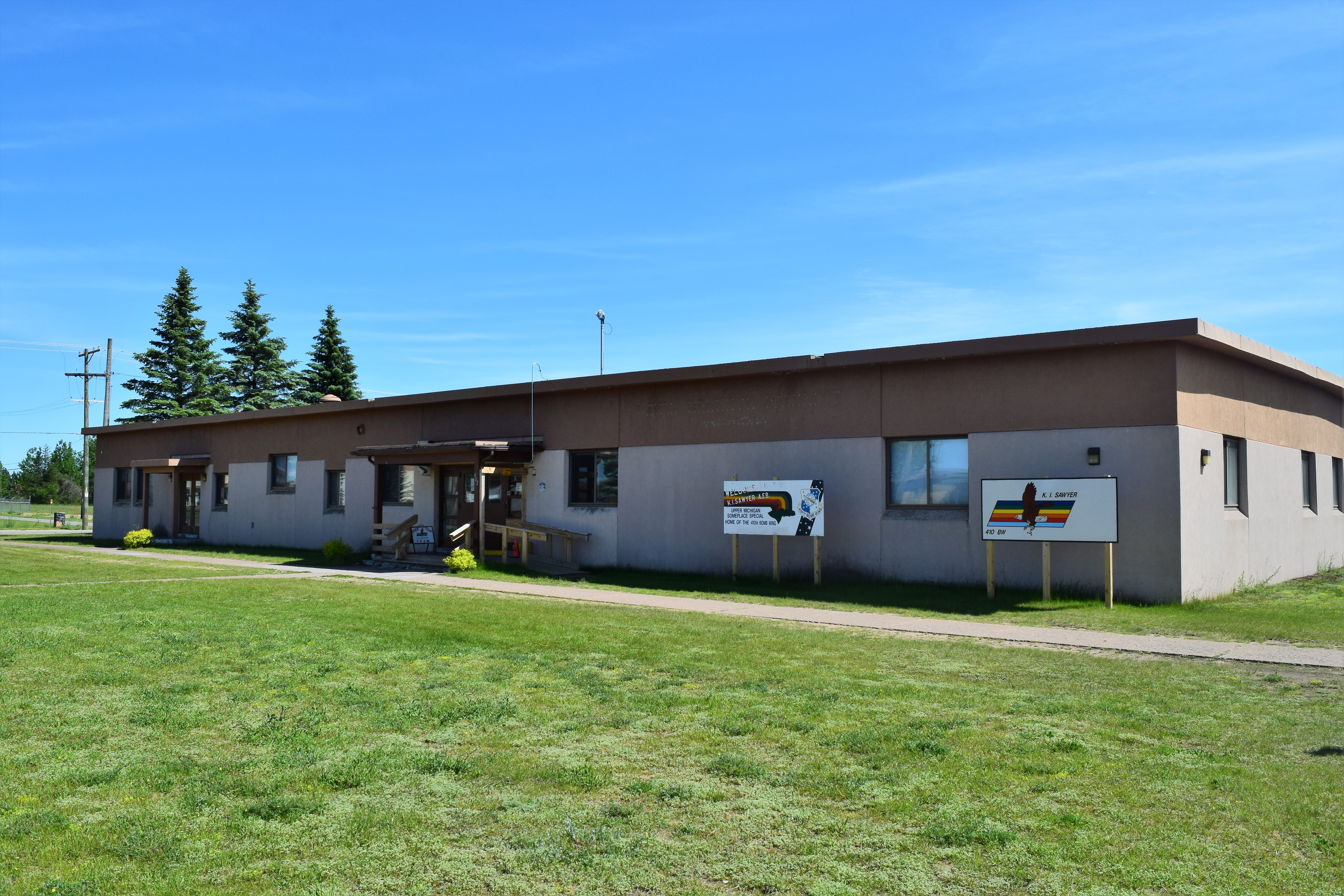
- Museum building

- Location within Michigan
- Established: 1993
- Location: K.I. Sawyer, Michigan
- Coordinates: 46.3383°N 87.3821°W
- Type: Military aviation museum
- Website: www.kisawyerheritageairmuseum.org

The K. I. Sawyer Heritage Air Museum is a military aviation museum located at the Marquette Sawyer Regional Airport near Marquette, Michigan focused on the history of K. I. Sawyer Air Force Base.

== History ==
The museum was founded in 1993 by the Air Force Association Lake Superior Chapter 283 to preserve a number of aircraft on display at K. I. Sawyer Air Force Base following an announcement that the base would close. Without a sponsoring organization, the aircraft would be transferred to other locations by the Air Force. The museum was originally located in a gymnasium, but later moved to the Silver Wings Recreation Center.

The museum dedicated a new memorial in 2023.

== Collection ==
=== Aircraft ===
- Boeing B-52D Stratofortress
- Convair F-106A Delta Dart
- General Dynamics FB-111A Aardvark
- Lockheed T-33
- McDonnell F-101B Voodoo

=== Other ===
- ADM-20 Quail

== See also ==
- List of aviation museums
- Wurtsmith Air Museum
