= K. I. Sawyer Air Force Base =

- Near Marquette, Michigan in the United States
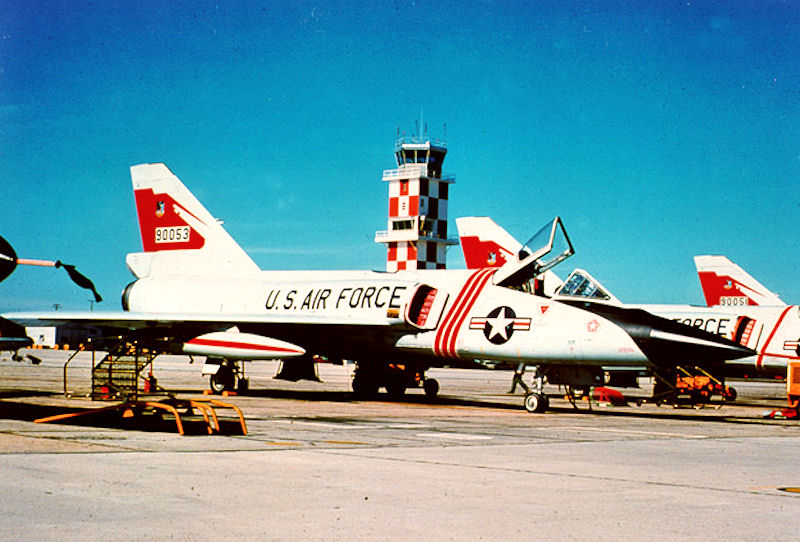
- Convair F-106 Delta Darts of the 87th Fighter-Interceptor Squadron on the flight line at K. I. Sawyer AFB in 1976

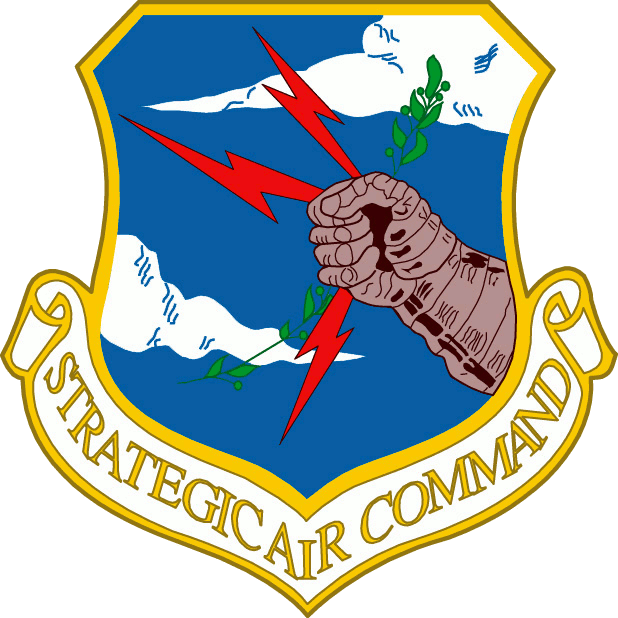

Site information
- Type: US Air Force Base
- Owner: Department of Defense
- Operator: US Air Force
- Controlled by: Strategic Air Command
- Condition: Closed

Location
- Location within Michigan Location within the United States
- Coordinates: 46°21′13″N 87°23′43″W

Site history
- Built: 1944 (as K. I. Sawyer Airport)
- In use: 1956–1995
- Fate: Became Sawyer International Airport and other civilian uses

Garrison information
- Garrison: 410th Bomb Wing

Airfield information
- Identifiers: FAA LID: SAW, WMO: 727435
- Elevation: 1,221 feet (372 m) AMSL
Runways
Direction	Length and surface
1/19	12,366 feet (3,769 m) Asphalt/concrete

K. I. Sawyer Air Force Base is a decommissioned United States Air Force (USAF) installation in Marquette County, Michigan, south of Marquette. Near the center of Michigan's Upper Peninsula, the base operated for nearly 40 years and closed in 1995. The county airport, Marquette Sawyer Regional Airport, now occupies a portion of the base and has scheduled airline flights and some general aviation activity.

The area of the former base is now an unincorporated community and census-designated place (CDP) for statistical purposes. The CDP is known as K. I. Sawyer and had a population of 3,064 at the 2020 census, up from 2,624 in 2010. It is located within Forsyth Township and West Branch Township.

== History ==
The origins of K. I. Sawyer Air Force Base begin in the mid-1930s when Kenneth Ingalls Sawyer (1884–1944), a civil engineer and Marquette County road commissioner, desired to build an airport which would aid the development of the Marquette area. The one factor which most likely influenced the establishment and final location of the airport was the growing mining industry in the local area. As the demand for iron ore increased, the need for travel increased. By 1937, air service became a necessity, and a county airport was built in Negaunee Township.

The population of the area continued to grow, and in 1941 Sawyer presented a plan for a new airport to handle the ever-increasing demands. The board agreed with the idea. Shortly thereafter, the United States was drawn into World War II. Local concern for the protection of the Great Lakes and the Soo Locks prompted citizens to propose that the U.S. Army Air Forces take over the new airfield. At that time, the proposal was shelved.

=== K. I. Sawyer Airport ===
Sawyer died in 1944, and the following year the airfield, consisting of a single airstrip, was completed and named K. I. Sawyer Airport in his honor. It was used by private fliers until 1948 when Nationwide Airlines became the first commercial airline to operate flights out of the airport. Nationwide flew shuttles to Detroit from Marquette, with stops in Escanaba, Iron Mountain, and Menominee.

In February 1954, the U.S. Air Force announced plans to enlarge its forces, and new bases were needed. The government entered into negotiations with the county to lease the airport and offered to build a $12 million jet base which could be jointly used by the USAF and Marquette-area citizens. The major stipulation made by the government was no more than 300 landings per month could be made by civilian aircraft. In January 1955, a public meeting was held in the county courthouse to discuss the proposed lease. Many at this meeting voted to adopt a resolution urging the Marquette City Commission to accept the government's offer.

=== K. I. Sawyer Air Force Base ===
On 24 January 1955 the U.S. government signed a 99-year lease. Almost immediately, construction of military support facilities began. About 850 people were employed during the construction of the base, and another 262 were actively employed during the winter months. A letter from Secretary of the Air Force Harold E. Talbott to U.S. Senator Homer S. Ferguson was printed in The Mining Journal and reported more than 900 military personnel were to be stationed at the base with an annual income in excess of $3 million. The base officially opened as a joint civil-military facility on 8 April 1956.

USAF facilities constructed included a 12,366-foot-long (3,770 m) and 300-foot-wide (90 m) runway. The wide-open airspace offers ease of operations for a safe and delay-free air traffic setting. The official opening of K. I. Sawyer AFB occurred on 8 May 1959, at which time the airfield became a strictly military operation.

==== Air Defense Command ====

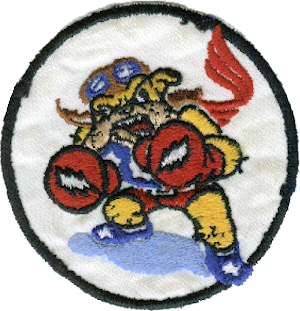

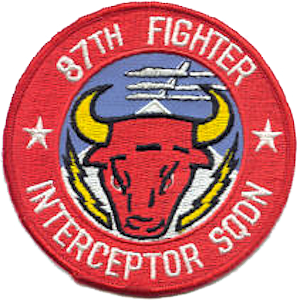

Upon activation, K. I. Sawyer was placed under the Jurisdiction of Air Defense Command (ADC) on 8 April 1956. The 473d Fighter Group was activated as the host unit, under the ADC 4706th Air Defense Wing at O'Hare International Airport, Illinois.

The initial mission of the base was to act as a fighter-interceptor defense against an enemy bomber attack, the 484th Fighter-Interceptor Squadron (FIS) was activated on 8 June 1956, and authorized F-89D Scorpion interceptors, however the 484th FIS was never properly equipped or manned because much construction was necessary to bring the airport up to USAF standards for a military airfield. In 1957, civilian commercial operations from the base moved to the Marquette County Airport, erected at the site of county airport. The first aircraft assigned to K. I. Sawyer were F-102 Delta Daggers from the 438th Fighter-Interceptor Squadron at Kincheloe Air Force Base, which were temporarily stationed at K. I. Sawyer during the summer of 1958.

On 8 November 1958 the Sault Sainte Marie Air Defense Sector (SsmADS) was established at K. I. Sawyer AFB. The ADC command and control organization's mission was to operate the Semi-Automatic Ground Environment (SAGE) Data Center (DC-14), which opened in 1959. The SAGE system was a network linking USAF General Surveillance Radar stations into a centralized center for air defense, intended to provide early warning and response for a Soviet nuclear attack. SsmADS also supported the Antigo AFS (P-19) and Calumet AFS (P-16) ADC Ground-Controlled Interception and warning stations

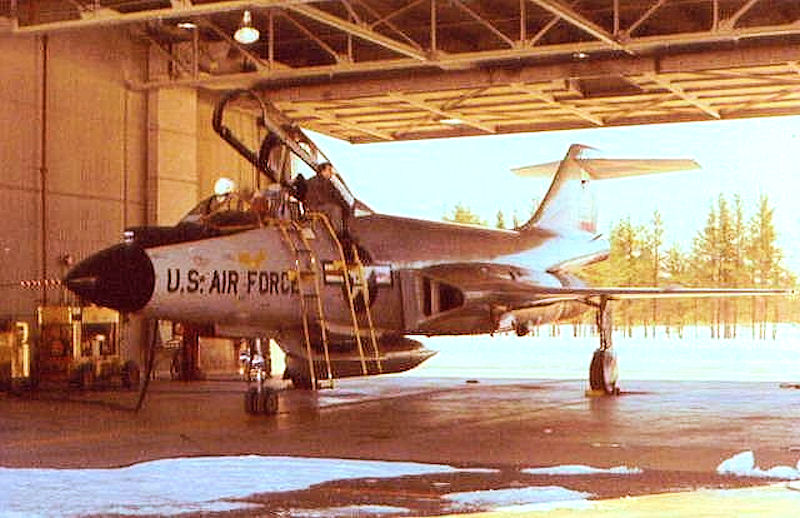
F-101 of the 62d Fighter-Interceptor Squadron on Alert during the 1960s

Further expansion of the base occurred in 1959 when the runway was extended to 12,366 feet (2.34 mi; 3.77 km). Prior to the expansion, ADC replaced the 473d Fighter Group with the 56th Fighter Wing, along with its 62d Fighter-Interceptor Squadron, to Sawyer as the host unit. The 56th FW received its first aircraft, a McDonnell F-101 Voodoo, in 1959, after the expanded runway was completed. The F-101s provided the SAGE unit with the required intercept and destroy capabilities that gave the base teeth. In 1961 the 56th Fighter Wing was discontinued, and the host unit at Sawyer became the SsmADS. In a reorganization in 1964, SAC assumed jurisdiction of the base, and ADC phased down its presence to a tenant organization. The 62d FIS came under the command and control of the Duluth Air Defense Sector, and the SsmADS was inactivated. Responsibilities for the SAGE system were switched to the Duluth ADS (DC-10) and the Detroit ADS (DC-06).

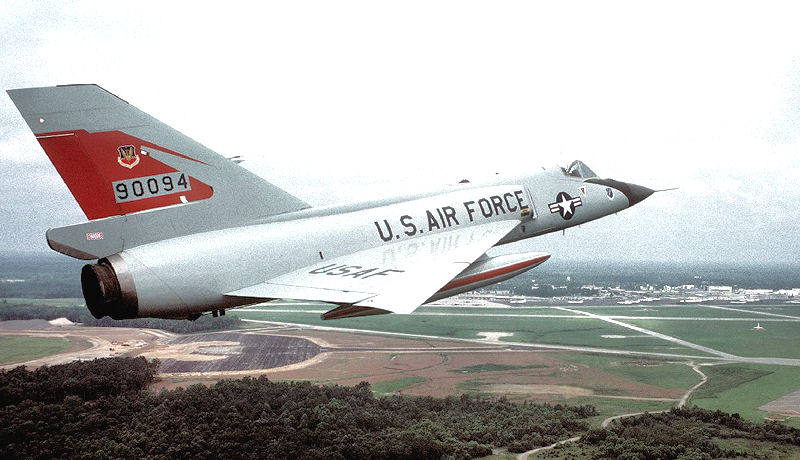
F-106A (59–0094) of the 87th Fighter-Interceptor Squadron in flight in the early 1980s. Note the Tactical Air Command emblem on the tail, replacing the squadron emblem.

In 1969, Air Defense Command was redesignated as Aerospace Defense Command. In 1971, the 62d Fighter-Interceptor Squadron and its F-101B was replaced with a new squadron and aircraft. The new squadron was the 87th Fighter Interceptor Squadron, the "Red Bulls," which flew the F-106A Delta Dart. The 87th maintained four Lockheed T-33 aircraft to provide target support for the squadron interceptors, simulating Soviet bomber tactics. In addition, they flew NORAD radar evaluation and logistic support sorties.

ADC was disestablished in 1979, and all ADC aircraft assets were transferred to Tactical Air Command under a sub-organization known as Air Defense – Tactical Air Command (ADTAC). The 87th and their F-106 aircraft remained based and maintained alert status at Sawyer. The 87th was scheduled to convert to the F-15 Eagle in 1984. However, due to budget cuts the conversion was cancelled, and the squadron was scheduled for inactivation on 1 October 1985 as the continental air defense mission in the United States was increasingly transferred to the Air National Guard. When inactivated, the 87th was the second-to-last F-106 squadron on active duty.

On 4 September 1985, the last three F-106 Delta Darts from the 87th departed K. I. Sawyer for AMARC at Davis-Monthan AFB. Most of its aircraft were later converted to QF-106 target drones and expended as aerial targets over the Gulf of Mexico as part of the "Pacer Six Program" during the late 1990s at Tyndall AFB by the 82d Aerial Targets Squadron.

==== Strategic Air Command ====
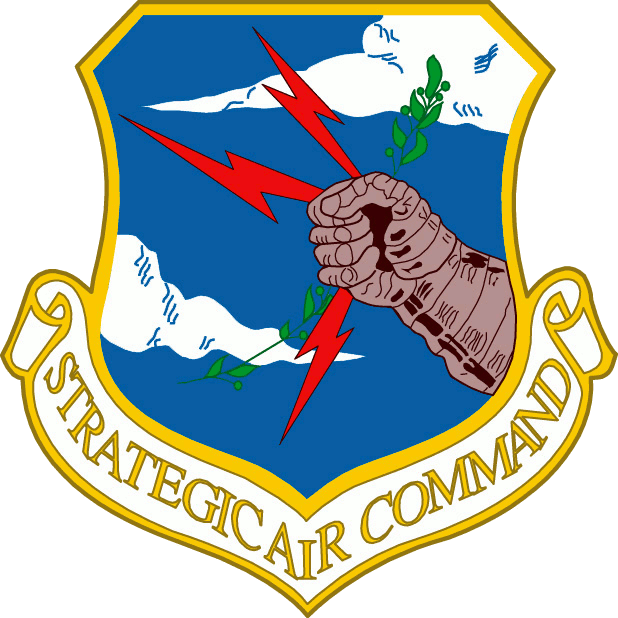

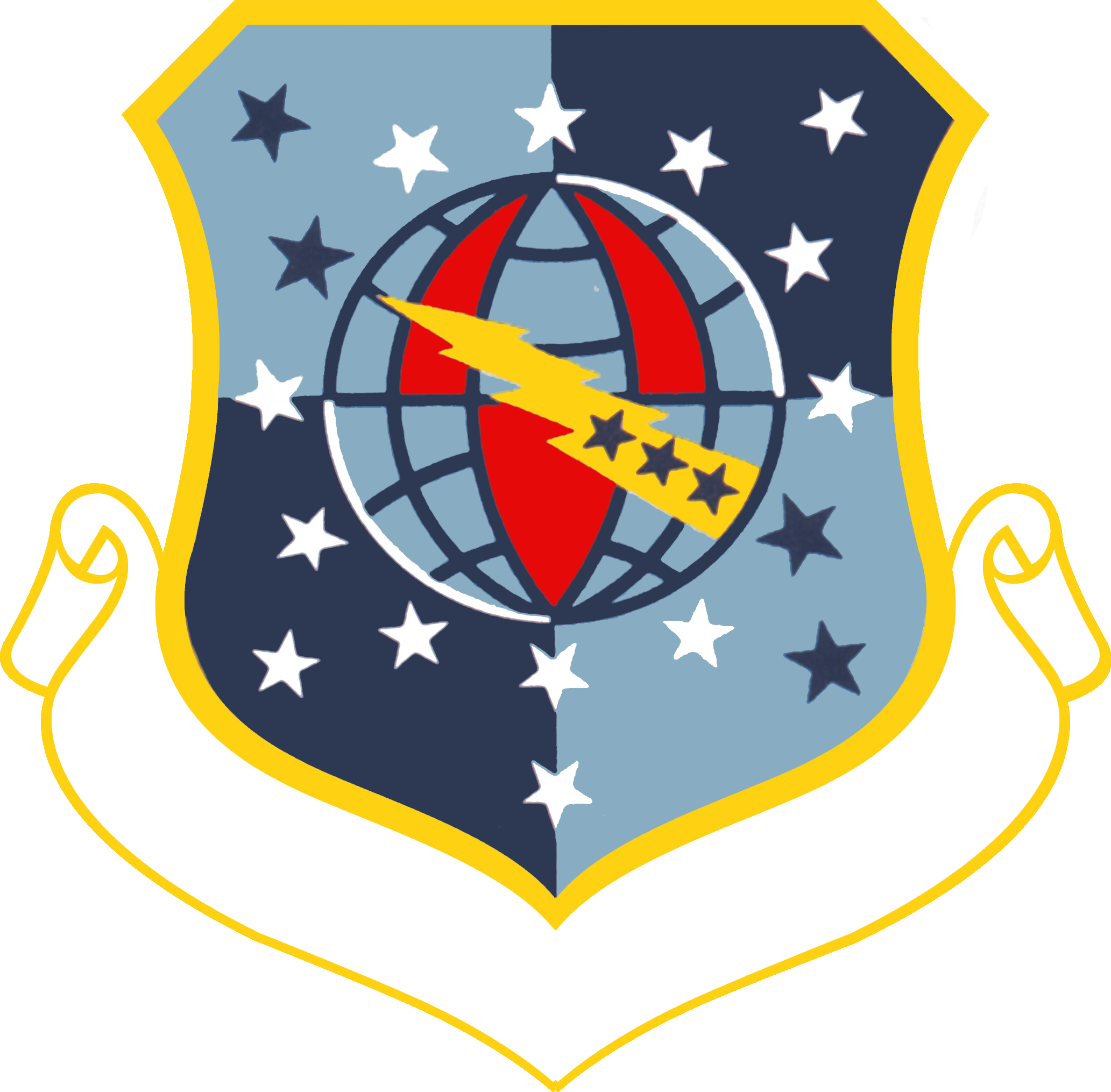

The Strategic Air Command (SAC) became a tenant organization at K. I. Sawyer AFB on 1 August 1958 with the organization of the 4042d Strategic Wing. The 4042d SW was a B-52H Stratofortress dispersal wing, a part of SAC's plan to disperse its big bombers over a larger number of bases, thus making it more difficult for the Soviet Union to knock out the entire fleet with a surprise first strike.

Before receiving the KC-135A tanker and heavy B-52H bomber aircraft of SAC, an all-weather, heavy-duty concrete runway was built, measuring 24 inches (61 cm) thick and 150 feet (46 m) wide. It was extended in 1959 from 6,000 to 12,366 feet (1,830 to 3,770 m), overruns of 1,000 feet (300 m). There are also 75-foot (23 m) shoulders on each side of the runway, providing a paved width of 300 feet (90 m).

The two operational units to be assigned later to this wing were the 923d Air Refueling Squadron on 1 May 1960, and the 526th Bombardment Squadron on 1 June 1961. The refueling squadron's first KC-135A aircraft arrived 4 August 1960, and the unit was declared fully combat ready in November of that year.

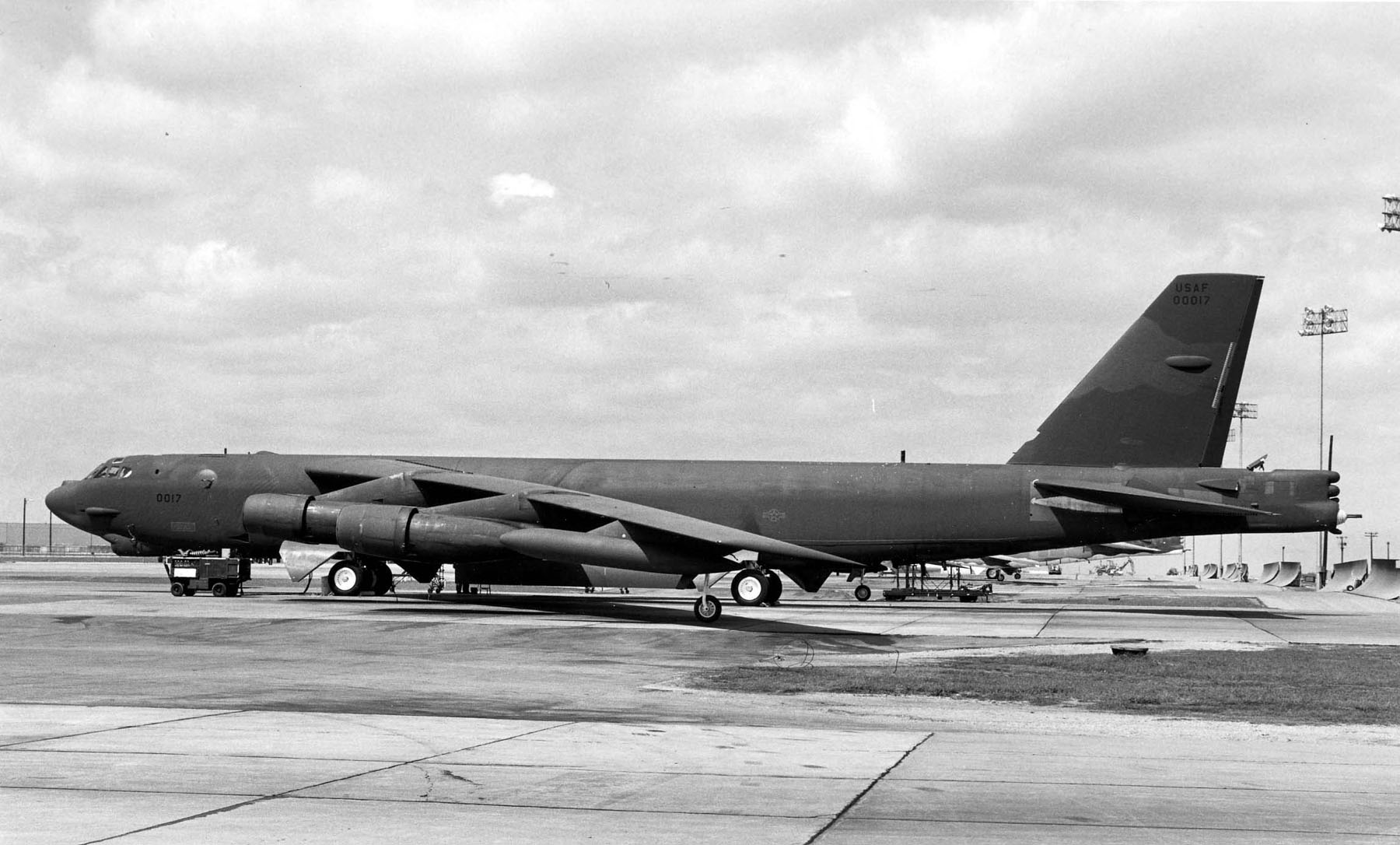
A Boeing B-52H (SN 60-0017), the type assigned to the 410th Bomb Wing at K. I. Sawyer AFB

In April 1961, the 923d was inactivated, and the 46th Air Refueling Squadron organized and activated as a replacement unit. The first B-52H aircraft assigned to the 526th arrived at Sawyer in August 1961. On 1 February 1963, the 4042d Strategic Wing was discontinued and the 410th Bombardment Wing (Heavy) organized and activated with no change in mission, personnel or aircraft. Also on that date, the 644th Bombardment Squadron was activated replacing the 526th, and the 46th Air Refueling Squadron was reassigned to the 410th. The majority of the wing's present support squadrons were also activated on this date as well.

On 1 January 1964, SAC assumed jurisdiction of K. I. Sawyer AFB, with the 410th Bomb Wing becoming the host unit under the 4th Strategic Aerospace Division. K. I. Sawyer was one of three SAC bases in Michigan that operated the B-52: the others were Kincheloe AFB and Wurtsmith AFB.

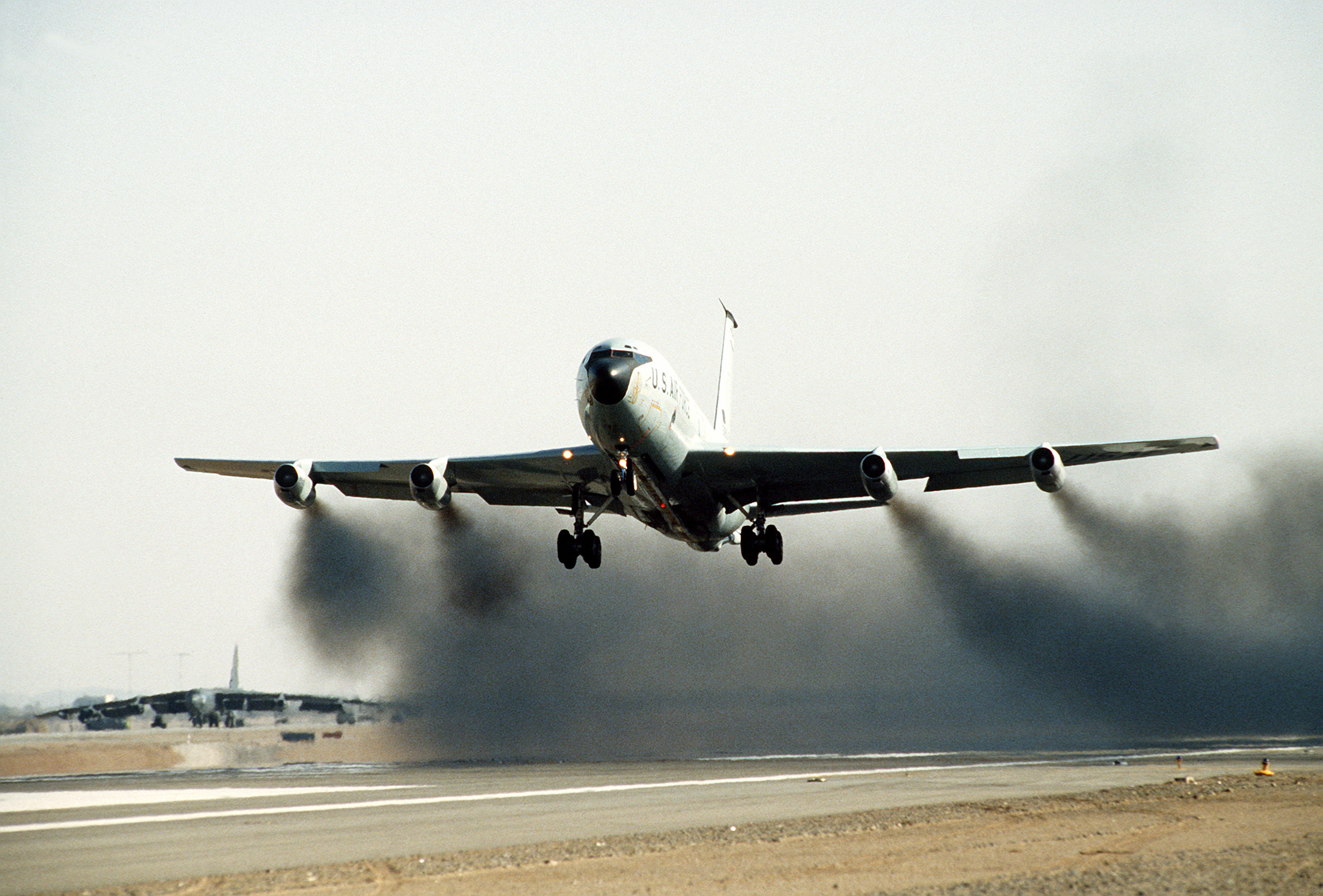
A KC-135A taking off with water injection to its J-57 engines

The 410th and its subordinate units' mission was to operate at full readiness; support activities included aircraft and vehicle maintenance, bombing crew and unit training, and air refueling support. The 410th did not deploy bomber aircraft to Southeast Asia during the Vietnam War, as the B-52H was dedicated to strategic deterrence. However, the tanker aircraft and aircrews participated in the "Young Tiger" effort, and the bomber aircrews went through RTU (Replacement Training Unit) training to fly B-52Ds out of Andersen AFB and U-Tapao Royal Thai Navy Airfield in Thailand and were active participants in many of the notable campaigns that took place in Southeast Asia, such as Operation Arc Light.

One Sawyer KC-135A (61–0313) became famous throughout the SAC community as "the glider" when it ran out of fuel on a short final approach prior to landing at its home base after flying practice approaches at Kincheloe AFB to complete requalification training. The flight crew, with the exception of the instructor pilot, bailed out when the engines went quiet. The instructor pilot, who remained on board, landed the aircraft just short of the runway overrun, bounced and rolled to a stop on the runway. The aircraft was repaired and returned to service quickly, and even the crew entry door (which separated from the aircraft during bailout procedures) was returned to the USAF by a local farmer.

Other aircraft assigned to K. I. Sawyer over the years included HH-43B and HH-1H rescue helicopters of the 48th and 39th Air Rescue and Recovery Wings at Eglin AFB at the K. I. Sawyer Helicopter (later re-designated Training) Annex, 14 March 1975 to 1 October 1977. SAC FB-111 bombers assigned to the 509th Bombardment Wing (Medium) from Pease AFB, on satellite alert at Sawyer in 1974 and 1975.

In the early 1980s, K. I. Sawyer's B-52s were modified to carry the new Boeing AGM-86 Air-Launched Cruise Missile (ALCM). In 1980, two B-52H crews assigned to the 644th Bomb Squadron (S-21 and S-31) were awarded the Mackay Trophy for "executing a nonstop, around-the-world mission with the immediate objective of locating and photographing elements of the Soviet Navy operating in the Persian Gulf." The wing commander at this time was Colonel G. Alan Dugard, author of the 2011 book about the Operation Linebacker II missions of 1972, titled "When the Wolf Rises."

=== Closure ===
In 1993, the Base Realignment and Closure Commission of the federal government (BRAC 1993) recommended the base for closure. The KC-135 tankers departed in October 1993, and the B-52H's were split between the two remaining B-52 bases, Barksdale AFB and Minot AFB; K. I. Sawyer's final B-52 left for Minot in November 1994.

The last aircraft assigned to Sawyer were six T-37 Tweet jet trainers of the 71st Flying Training Wing assigned to "Accelerated Copilot Enrichment Program" in 1977 and were later assigned to the "Companion Trainer Program" under Air Combat Command. K. I. Sawyer AFB was officially closed at the end of September 1995.

The closure of K. I. Sawyer had a major negative economic impact on the Upper Peninsula of Michigan. With 12,000 people, the base and the area around it functioned as the Upper Peninsula's second-largest city, and the U.S. Air Force's annual spending in the region totaled $157 million. As of 1993, Marquette County was projected to lose 20 percent of its economy. In the end, the closure led to the loss of 5,000 jobs and 14,000 residents. As of 2016, the town around the base had a reputation as a troubled area with a slew of abandoned and boarded-up buildings.

=== Legacy ===
K. I. Sawyer was a favorite base among the SAC community. Although isolated, it was an attractive base for its north woods location and its proximity to outdoor activities off the base, including hunting, fishing, boating, and winter sports including skiing at Marquette Mountain (known as "Cliffs Ridge" before 1982), as well as the venues on site (base lake, ski hill, and others).

While the base was sometimes referred to as "K. I. Siberia" or "The Rock" and there was an abundance of lake-effect snow, it was not the bitter sub-zero temperatures and wind chills and hot summers of the tree-sparse North Dakota bases, or the confinement of the bases in the more established communities of the northeastern states. Locals maintained that the K. I. Sawyer runway was built over some of the best blueberry fields in the state. Berry patches remained on many other parts of the base, and families of aircrew members often picked them near the alert barracks and the family center.

A portion of the operational section has been converted into Marquette Sawyer Regional Airport, which opened its passenger terminal for service as Sawyer International Airport in September 1999. It replaced the smaller Marquette County Airport as the region's primary civilian airport.

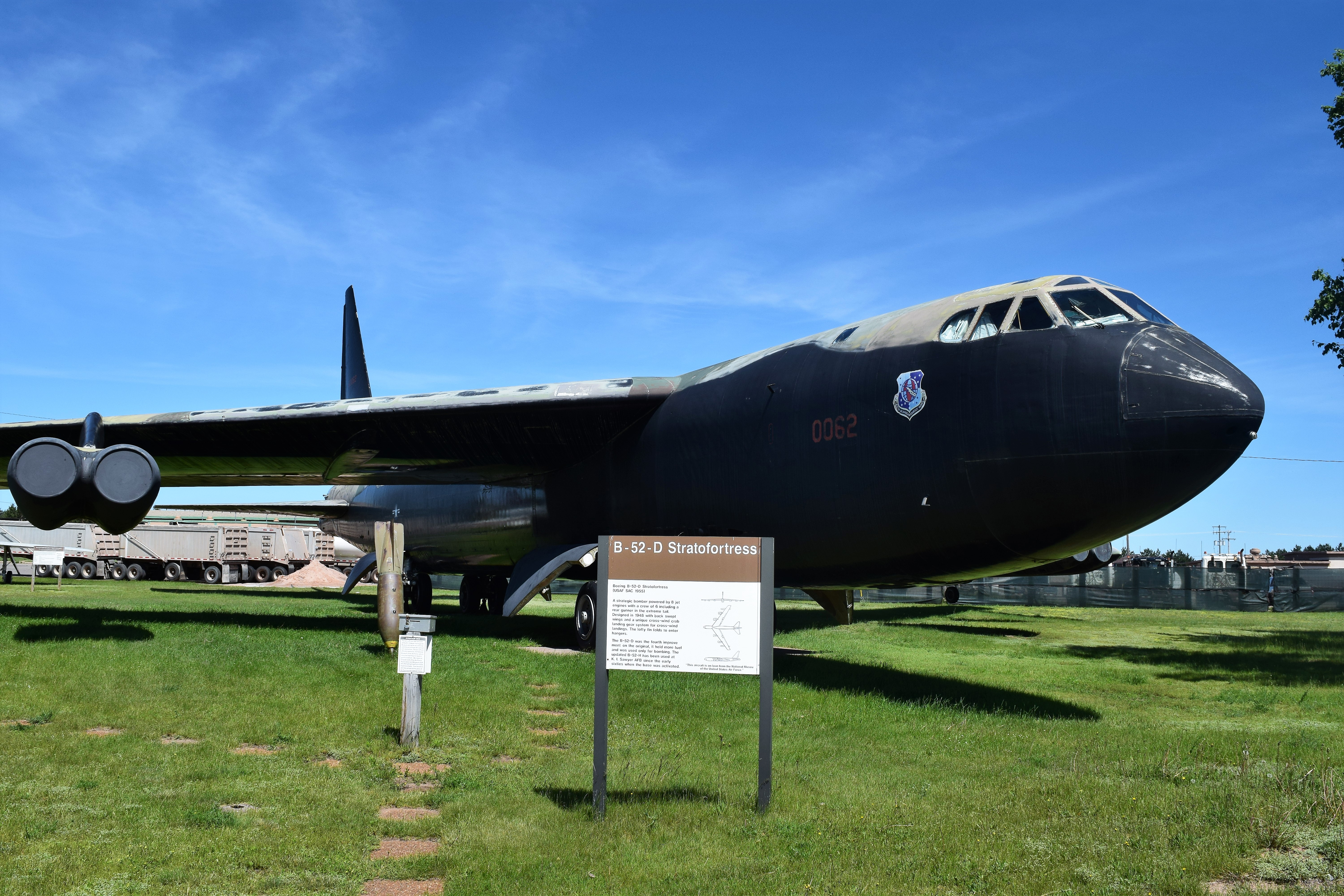
A retired Boeing B-52 Stratofortress bomber outside on concrete pads as part of a static display collection of five aircraft, one unguided bomb and one ADM-20 Quail decoy cruise missile, commemorating the former K. I. Sawyer Air Force Base.

In recent years, a group of local citizens interested in preserving the historical significance of the base have collected six aircraft of the types used actively at various times through the base's history to be displayed near the airport. The program is known as the "Sawyer 6" project. The aircraft are part of the K. I. Sawyer Heritage Air Museum, which also has exhibits in the base's former Silver Wings Recreation Center.

=== Previous names ===
- Opened as: K. I. Sawyer Airport, 8 April 1956
- Redesignated: K. I. Sawyer Air Force Base, 8 May 1959 – 30 September 1995

=== Major commands to which assigned ===
- Air Defense Command (ADC), 8 April 1956
- Strategic Air Command (SAC), 1 January 1964
- Air Combat Command (ACC), 1 June 1992 – 30 September 1995 (Tail Code: "KI")

=== Major units assigned ===
- 56th Fighter Wing (Air Defense), 1 February 1951 – 1 January 1964
  - 473d Fighter Group, 8 April 1956 – 1 October 1959
    - 484th Fighter-Interceptor Squadron, 8 June 1956 – 16 February 1959 (not equipped)
- 62d Fighter-Interceptor Squadron, 1 August 1959 – 30 April 1971
- 87th Fighter-Interceptor Squadron, 1 May 1971 – 1 October 1985
- Sault Sainte Marie Air Defense Sector, 8 November 1958 – 15 December 1963
- 4042d Strategic Wing, 1 August 1958 – 1 February 1963
  - 526th Bombardment Squadron, 1 June 1961 – 1 February 1963
  - 923d Air Refueling Squadron, 1 May 1960 – 1 April 1961
- 410th Bombardment Wing, later 410th Wing, later 410th Bomb Wing, 1 February 1963 – 30 September 1995
  - 46th Air Refueling Squadron, 1 April 1961 – 8 October 1993
  - 644th Bombardment Squadron, 1 February 1963 – 21 November 1994

== Geography ==
K.I. Sawyer AFB, Michigan
- Census-designated place (CDP) & unincorporated community
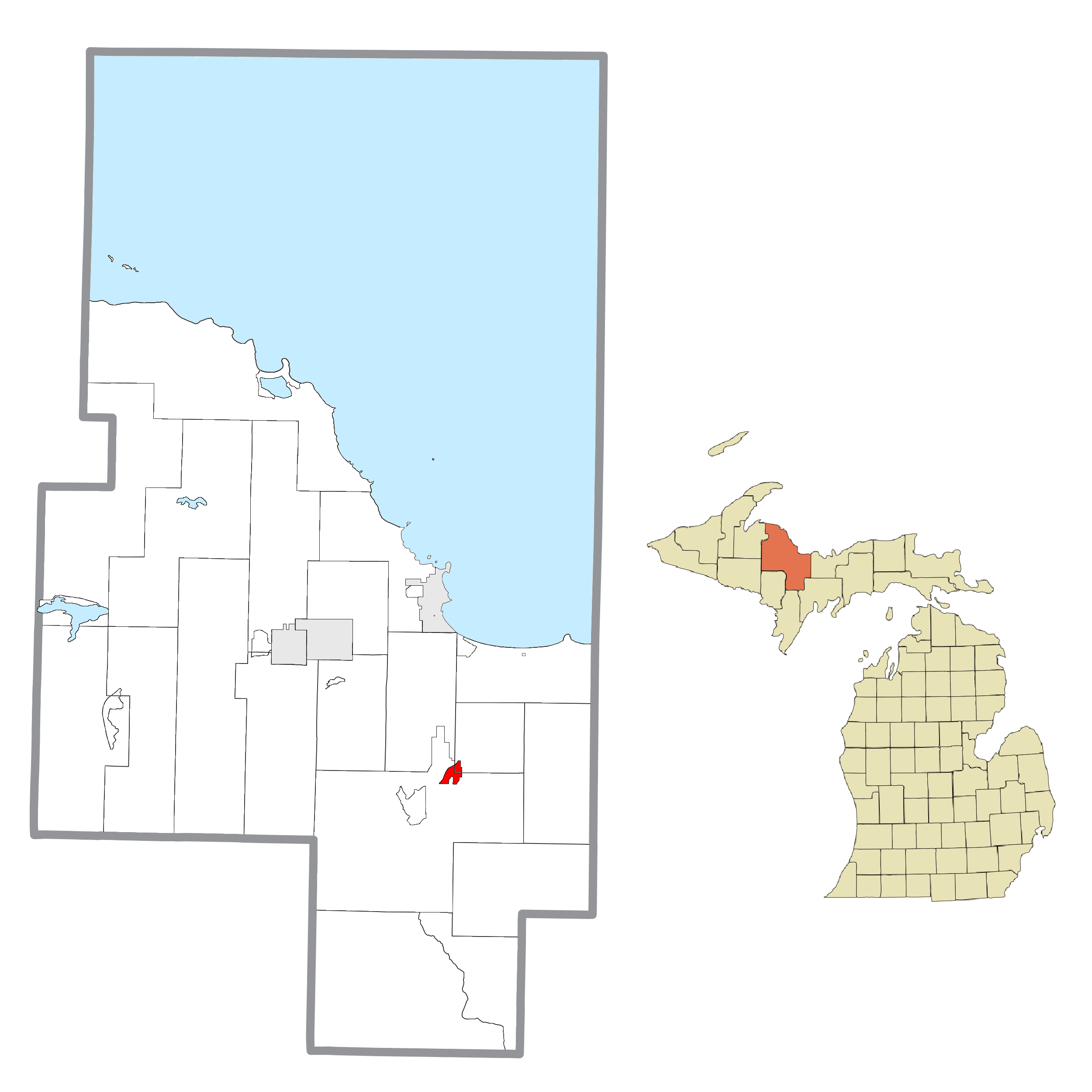
- Location within Marquette County
- Coordinates: 46°21′13″N 87°23′43″W
- Country: United States
- State: Michigan
- County: Marquette
- Townships: Forsyth and West Branch

Area
  - Total: 1.73 sq mi (4.49 km^{2})
  - Land: 1.71 sq mi (4.43 km^{2})
  - Water: 0.019 sq mi (0.05 km^{2})
- Elevation: 1,158 ft (353 m)

Population (2020)
  - Total: 3,064
  - Density: 1,790.2/sq mi (691.21/km^{2})
- Time zone: UTC-5 (Eastern (EST))
  - Summer (DST): UTC-4 (EDT)
- ZIP Code: 49841 (Gwinn)
- Area code: 906
- GNIS feature ID: 2393067
- Website: www.sawyerairport.com

The elevation at the passenger terminal is 1,190 feet (363 m) above sea level, about 600 feet (180 m) above Lake Superior, fifteen miles (24 km) north.

According to the United States Census Bureau, the CDP has a total area of 1.73 square miles (4.48 km^{2}), of which 1.71 square miles (4.43 km^{2}) are land and 0.02 square miles (0.052 km^{2}), or 1.21%, are water. The CDP was previously much larger at the 2000 census, encompassing 8.5 square miles (22.01 km^{2}) until the Sand Township portion was removed—leaving only the smaller portions within Forsyth and West Branch townships.

== Demographics ==
Historical population
Census	Pop.	Note	%±
1970	6,679		—
1980	7,345		10.0%
1990	6,577		−10.5%
2000	1,443		−78.1%
2010	2,624		81.8%
2020	3,064		16.8%

As of the census of 2000, there were 1,443 people, 501 households, and 360 families residing in the CDP. The population density was 171.0 inhabitants per square mile (66.0 inhabitants/km^{2}). There were 1,659 housing units at an average density of 196.6 per square mile (75.9/km^{2}). The racial makeup of the base was 90.23% White, 0.69% African American, 3.47% Native American, 0.35% Asian, 1.18% from other races, and 4.09% from two or more races. Hispanic or Latino of any race were 2.15% of the population.

There were 501 households, out of which 55.1% had children under the age of 18 living with them, 45.9% were married couples living together, 19.6% had a female householder with no husband present, and 28.1% were non-families. 17.8% of all households were made up of individuals, and 2.2% had someone living alone who was 65 years of age or older. The average household size was 2.88 and the average family size was 3.27.

In the CDP, the population was spread out, with 38.5% under the age of 18, 12.3% from 18 to 24, 37.8% from 25 to 44, 9.1% from 45 to 64, and 2.3% who were 65 years of age or older. The median age was 25 years and for every 100 females, there were 92.7 males. For every 100 females age 18 and over, there were 93.0 males.

The median income for a household in the CDP was $26,550, and the median income for a family was $26,979. Males had a median income of $27,679 versus $18,333 for females. The per capita income for the CDP was $10,029. About 24.4% of families and 26.6% of the population were below the poverty line, including 30.6% of those under age 18 and 31.3% of those age 65 or over.

== See also ==
- List of former United States Air Force installations
- United States general surveillance radar stations
