= List of Strategic Air Command bases =

Shield of the Strategic Air Command

Shield of the Air Force Global Strike Command

The Strategic Air Command of the United States Air Force, and its successor body the Air Force Global Strike Command, operate or formerly operated many air bases in United States and also in some other countries.

== United States ==
Entries in this section use the following formats:

- Present name (former name and date of name change), Location. (T) = Tenant, (H)=Host.
- (Previous name) Present name and date of name change. Location. (T) =Tenant, (H)=Host.

=== Abilene AFB, TX (Dyess AFB, 15 Dec 1956) ===
- 341st Bomb Wing 1955–1956

=== Altus AFB, Altus, OK (H) ===
- 816th Air Division 1958–1962.
- 816th Strategic Aerospace Division 1962–1965.
  - 11th Air Refueling Wing 1968–1969.
  - 11th Bomb Wing 1957–1962.
  - 11th Strategic Aerospace Wing 1962–1968.
  - 96th Bomb Wing 1953–1957.
  - 340th Air Refueling Wing 1984–1992.

=== Amarillo AFB, Amarillo, TX (H) ===
- 4128th Strategic Wing 1958–1963.
- 461st Bomb Wing 1963–1968

=== Andrews AFB, Camp Spring, MD (T) ===
- Namesake: Lt Gen Frank Maxwell Andrews
  - Strategic Air Command HQ 1946–1948.
    - 4th Fighter Wing 1947–1948.
    - 311th Reconnaissance Group 1946–1948

=== Barksdale AFB, Bossier City, LA (H) ===
- Namesake: Lieutenant Eugene Hoy Barksdale
  - Second Air Force 1949–1975.
  - Eighth Air Force 1975–1992.
    - 4th Air Division 1952–1964.
    - 311th Air Division 1949.
      - 2d Bomb Wing 1963–1991.
      - 2d Wing 1991–1992.
      - 91st Strategic Reconnaissance Wing 1949–1951.
      - 301st Bomb Wing 1949–1958.
      - 311th Reconnaissance Group 1948–1949
      - 376th Bomb Wing 1951–1957.
      - 4220th Strategic Reconnaissance Wing 1965–1966.
      - 4238th Strategic Wing 1958–1963.

=== Beale AFB, Marysville, CA (H) ===
- Namesake: Brig Gen Edward Fitzgerald Beale
  - Second Air Force 1991–1992,
    - 14th Air Division 1960–1962,
    - 14th Air Division 1972–1991.
    - 14th Strategic Aerospace Division 1962–1972.
      - 9th Strategic Reconnaissance Wing 1966–1991,
      - 9th Wing 1991–1992,
      - 17th Bomb Wing 1975–1976,
      - 100th Air Refueling Wing 1976–1983,
      - 456th Bomb Wing 1972–1975,
      - 456th Strategic Aerospace Wing 1962–1971,
      - 4126th Strategic Wing 1959–1963,
      - 4200th Strategic Reconnaissance Wing 1965–1966,

=== Bergstrom AFB, Austin, TX (H) ===
- Namesake: Capt John August Bergstrom
  - 12th Fighter Day Wing 1957–1958
  - 12th Fighter Escort Wing 1950–1953
  - 12th Strategic Fighter Wing 1953–1957
  - 27th Fighter Escort Wing 1950–1953
  - 27th Fighter Wing 1949–1950
  - 27th Strategic Fighter Wing 1953–1958
  - 67th Tactical Reconnaissance Wing 1971-1993
  - 131st Fighter – Bomber Wing 1951
  - 340th Bomb Wing 1963–1966
  - 4130th Strategic Wing 1958–1963

=== Biggs AFB, El Paso, TX (H) ===
- Namesake: James Berthea "Buster" Biggs
  - 810th Air Division 1952–1962
    - 95th Bomb Wing 1952–1966
    - 97th Bomb Wing 1948–1959

=== Blytheville AFB, Blytheville, AR (Eaker AFB 26 May 1988) (H) ===
- Namesake: General Ira Clarence Eaker
- 42d Air Division 1963–1969.
- 42d Air Division 1970–1971.
- 42d Air Division 1973–1988
- 42d Strategic Aerospace Division 1963
  - 97th Bomb Wing 1959–1988

=== Bolling AFB, Washington, DC (T) ===
- Namesake: Colonel Raynal Cawthorne Bolling
  - E District of Columbia
    - Strategic Air Commands HQ 1946

=== Buckley Field, Aurora, CO. (T) ===
- Namesake: 2nd Lieutenant John Harold Buckley
- 311th Reconnaissance Wing 1946–1948

=== Bunker Hill AFB (Grissom AFB, 12 May 1968), Peru, IN (H) ===
- Namesake: Lieutenant Colonel Virgil Ivan "Gus" Grissom
- 305th Bomb Wing 1959–1968.

=== (Fort Worth AFB) Carswell AFB, 27 Feb 1948, Fort Worth, TX (H) ===
- Namesake: Major Horace Seaver Carswell Jr.
- 8th Air Force 1948–1955
  - 7th Bomb Wing 1948–1991
    - 19th Air Division 1951–1988
      - 7th Wing 1991–1992
      - 11th Bomb Wing 1951–1957
      - 43d Bomb Wing 1960–1964
      - 4123d Strategic Wing 1957–1959

=== Camp Carson, Colorado Springs, CO (T). ===
- Namesake: Brevet Brigadier General Cristopher 'Kit' Carson
  - 3904th Composite Wing 1950–1952.

=== Campbell AFB, KY (T) ===
- Namesake: Governor and Brigadier General William Bowen Campbell
  - SAC Special Activities Center

=== Castle AFB, Merced County, CA (H) ===
- Namesake: Brigadier General Frederick Walker Castle
  - 47th Air Division 1959–1962
  - 47th Air Division 1963–1971.
  - 47th Strategic Aerospace Division 1962–1963.
    - 93d Bombardment Group 1946.
    - 93d Bomb Wing 1947–1991
    - 93d Wing 1991–1992

=== Chatham AFB (Hunter AFB), Savannah, GA (H). ===
- 22nd Bomb Wing 1949–1950

=== (Lake Charles AFB) Chennault AFB, LA 14 Nov 1958 (H). ===
- Namesake: Maj. Gen. Claire Lee Chennault
- 806th Air Division 1958–1960
  - 44th Bomb Wing 1958–1960
  - 68th Bomb Wing 1958–1963

=== Clinton County AFB, Wilmington, OH (T). ===
- 22nd Air Division 1959–1960
  - 4090th Air Refueling Wing 1958–1960

=== Clinton–Sherman AFB, Clinton, OK (H). ===
- Namesake: City of Clinton and the Sherman Iron Works.
  - 4090th Air Refueling Wing 1958–1960
  - 70th Bomb Wing 1962–1969.
  - 4123d Strategic Wing 1959–1963

=== Columbus AFB, Columbus, MS (H) ===
- 454th Bomb Wing 1962–1969
- 4228th Strategic Wing 1958–1963

=== Cooke AFB (Vandenberg AFB, 4 Oct 1958), Lompoc, CA (T). ===
- Current Namesake: General Hoyt Sanford Vandenberg
- Original Namesake: General Philip St. George Cooke.
  - 1st Missile Division 1957–1958
    - 704th Strategic Missile Wing 1957–1958

=== Davis–Monthan AFB, Tucson, AZ (H). ===
- Namesake: 1st Lieutenant Samuel H. Davis and 2d Lieutenant Oscar Monthan
  - 12th Air Division 1962–1971
  - 12th Strategic Aerospace Division 1962–1971
  - 12th Strategic Missile Division 1971–1973
  - 36th Air Division 1951–1960
    - 2d Bomb Wing 1947–1949
    - 40th Bombardment Group 1946
    - 43rd Bomb Wing 1947–1960
    - 100th Strategic Reconnaissance Wing 1966–1976
    - 303d Bomb Wing 1951–1964
    - 390th Bomb Wing 1953–1961
    - 390th Strategic Missile Wing 1962–1984
    - 444th Bombardment Group 1946
    - 4080th Strategic Wing 1969–1966.

=== Dow AFB, Bangor, ME (H). ===
- Namesake: 2nd Lieutenant James F. Dow
  - 6th Air Division 1961–1966
    - 101st Air Refueling Wing 1976–1992
    - 132d Fighter Bomber Wing 1951
    - 397th Bomb Wing 1962–1968
    - 506th Strategic Fighter Wing 1952–1955
    - 4038th Strategic Wing 1958–1963
    - 4060th Air Refueling Wing 1955–1963

=== (Abilene AFB) Dyess AFB 15 Dec 1956, Abilene, TX (H). ===
- Namesake: Lieutenant Colonel William E. Dyess
  - 341st Bomb Wing 1955–1956
  - 12th Air Division 1973–1988
  - 819th Air Division 1956–1962
  - 819th Strategic Aerospace Division 1962–1966
    - 7th Wing 1993–current
    - 96th Bomb Wing 1957–1962
    - 96th Bomb Wing 1972–1991
    - 96th Strategic Aerospace Wing 1962–1972
    - 96th Wing 1991–1992
    - 341st Bomb Wing 1956–1961

=== (Blytheville AFB) Eaker AFB 26 May 1988, Blythesville, AR (H). ===
- Namesake: General Ira C. Eaker
  - 97th Bomb Wing 1988–1991
  - 97th Wing 1991–1992

=== Eglin AFB, Ft. Walton Beach, FL (T). ===
- Namesake: Lieutenant Colonel Fredrick Irving Eglin.
  - 39th Bomb Wing 1963–1965
  - 4135th Strategic Wing 1958–1963

=== (Mile 26) Eielson AFB, Fairbanks 4 Feb 1948, AK 20 Jul 1957 (T) ===
- Namesake: Colonel Carl Benjamin Eielson
  - 6th Strategic Reconnaissance Wing 1988–1992
  - 6th Strategic Wing 1967–1988
  - 168th Air Refueling Wing 1986–1992
  - 4157th Strategic Wing 1962–1967
  - 97th Bomb Wing 1947–1948

=== (Rapid City AFB) Ellsworth AFB, 13 Jun 1953, Rapid City, SD (H). ===
- Namesake; Brigadier General Richard Elmer Ellsworth.
  - 12th Air Division 1988–1990
  - 821st Air Division 1959–1962
  - 821st Strategic Aerospace Division 1962–1971
    - 28th Bomb Wing 1955–1991
    - 28th Strategic Reconnaissance Wing 1953–1955
    - 28th Wing 1991–1992
    - 44th Missile Wing 1991–1992
    - 44th Strategic Missile Wing 1962–1991
    - 99th Strategic Weapons Wing 1989–1991
    - 99th Tactical and Training Wing 1991–1992

=== Elmendorf AFB, Anchorage, AK (T). ===
- Namesake: Captain Hugh Merle Elmendorf
  - 4158th Strategic Wing 1963–1966

=== Ent AFB, Colorado Springs, CO (T). ===
- Namesake: Brigadier General Uzal Girard Ent.
  - Fifteenth Air Force 1946–1949

=== (Spokane AFB) Fairchild AFB 20 Jul 1951, Spokane, WA. (H). ===
- Namesake: General Muir S. Fairchild
  - 18th Air Division 1959–1962
  - 18th Strategic Aerospace Division 1962–1968
  - 47th Air Division 1971–1987
  - 57th Air Division 1951–1956
    - 92d Bomb Wing 1951–1962
    - 92d Bomb Wing 1972–1991
    - 92d Strategic Aerospace Wing 1962–1972
    - 92d Wing 1991–1992
    - 98th Bomb Wing 1947–1948
    - 99th Bomb Wing 1955–1956
    - 99th Strategic Reconnaissance Wing 1953–1955
    - 141st Air Refueling Wing 1976–1992

=== Fairfield–Suisun AFB (Travis AFB 21 Apr 1951), Fairfield, CA (H). ===
- Namesake: Brigadier General Robert F. Travis
- 5th Bomb Wing 1955–1968
- 5th Strategic Reconnaissance Wing 1949–1955
- 9th Bomb Wing 1950–1953
- 9th Strategic Reconnaissance Wing 1949–1950

=== (Topeka AFB) Forbes AFB 1 Jul 1948, Topeka, KS (H). ===
- Namesake: Maj. Daniel Forbes
  - 21st Air Division 1951–1962
  - 21st Strategic Aerospace Division 1962–1964
  - 311th Air Division, Reconnaissance 1948–1949
    - 40th Bomb Wing 1960–1964
    - 40th Strategic Aerospace Wing 1964
    - 55th Strategic Reconnaissance Wing 1948–1949
    - 55th Strategic Reconnaissance Wing 1952–1966
    - 90th Bomb Wing 1951–1956
    - 90th Strategic Reconnaissance Wing 1956–1960
    - 190th Air Refueling Wing 1978–1992
    - 308th Bomb Wing 1951
    - 310th Bomb Wing 1952
    - 376th Bomb Wing 1951

=== Fort Worth AFB (Carswell AFB, 27 Feb 1948), Fort Worth, TX (H). ===
- 8Namesake: Horace S. Carswell Jr.
- 8th Air Force 1946–1948
  - 7th Bomb Wing 1947–1948
  - 43rd Bomb Wing 1960-1964
  - 58th Bombardment Group 1946
  - 448th Bombardment Group 1946

=== Francis E. Warren AFB, Cheyenne, WY (H). ===
- Namesake: Gov. Francis Emroy Warren
  - 4th Air Division 1973–1988
  - 4th Strategic Aerospace Division 1971–1988
  - 4th Strategic Missile Division 1971–1973
  - 13th Air Division 1963
  - 13th Strategic Missile Division 1963–1966
    - 90th Missile Wing 1991–1992
    - 90th Strategic Missile Wing 1963–1991
    - 389th Strategic Missile Wing 1961–1965
    - 706th Strategic Missile Wing 1958–1961
    - 4320th Strategic Wing (Missile) 1958

=== Geiger Field, WA. ===
- Namesake: Maj. Harold C. Geiger.
  - 141st Air Refueling Wing 1976

=== General Mitchell ARS, Milwaukee, WI. ===
- Namesake: Brig. Gen. William "Billy" Mitchell
  - 128th Air Refueling Wing 1976–1992

=== Glasgow AFB, Glasgow, MT (H). ===
- 91st Bomb Wing 1962–1968
- 4141st Strategic Wing 1958–1963

=== Grand Forks AFB, Grand Forks, ND (H). ===
- 4th Air Division 1964–1971
- 4th Strategic Aerospace Division 1971
- 42d Air Division 1988–1991
  - 319th Bomb Wing 1962–1991
  - 319th Wing 1991–1992
  - 321st Strategic Missile Wing 1964–1992
  - 449th Bombardment Group 1946
  - 4133d Strategic Wing 1958–1963

=== Grand Island AFB, Grand Island, NE. ===
- 449th Bombardment Group 1946

=== Great Falls AFB (Malmstrom AFB 15 Jun 1956), Great Falls, MT (H). ===
- Namesake: Col Einar Axel Malmstrom
- 407th Strategic Fighter Wing 1953–1956

=== Grenier AFB, Manchester, NH (T). ===
- Namesake: Lt. James D. Grenier
  - 82d Fighter Wing 1947–1949

=== Griffiss AFB 20 September 1948, Rome, NY (H). ===
- Namesake: Lt Col Townsend E. Griffiss
  - 416th Bomb Wing 1962–1991
  - 4039th Strategic Wing 1958–1963

=== (Bunker Hill AFB) Grissom AFB, 12 May 1968, Peru, IN (H). ===
- Namesake: Lt Col Virgil Ivan "Gus" Grissom
  - 305th Air Refueling Wing 1970–1992
- 305th Bomb Wing 1959–1970.
  - 434th Air Refueling Wing 1987–1992

=== Hanscom AFC, Bedford, MA. ===
- 66th Air Base Group

=== Hill AFB, Ogden, UT (T). ===
- Namesake: Maj Plover Peter Hill
  - 4062d Strategic Wing (Missile) 1960–1962

=== Homestead AFB, Homestead, FL (H). ===
- 823d Air Division 1956–1968
  - 19th Bomb Wing 1956–1968
  - 379th Bomb Wing 1953–1961

=== Hunter AFB, Savannah, GA (H). ===
- Namesake: Maj Gen Frank O'Driscoll Hunter.
  - 38th Air Division 1951–1959
    - 2d Bomb Wing 1950–1963
    - 308th Bomb Wing 1951–1959

=== K. I. Sawyer AFB, Gwinn, MI (H). ===
- Namesake: Kenneth Ingalls Sawyer.
  - 410th Bomb Wing 1962–91
  - 410th Wing 1991–92
  - 4042d Strategic Wing 1958 – 63

=== Kearney AFB, Kearney, NE. ===
- 27th Fighter Wing 1947–1949

=== Key Field ANGB, Meridian, MS. ===
- Namesake: Al and Fred Key
  - 186th Air Refueling Wing 1992

=== (Kinross AFB) Kincheloe AFB 25 Sep 1959, Kinross, MI (H). ===
- Namesake: Capt Iven Carl Kincheloe, Jr.
  - 416th Wing 1991–1992
  - 449th Bomb Wing 1962–1977
- 4239th Strategic Wing 1959–1963

=== Ladd Field, AK (T). ===
- Namesake: Maj Arthur K. Ladd.

=== Lake Charles AFB (Chennault AFB, 14 Nov 1958), Lake Charles, LA (H). ===
- Namesake: Major General Claire Lee Chennault.
- 806th Air Division 1952–1958
  - 44th Bomb Wing 1951–1958
  - 68th Bomb Wing 1952–1958
  - 68th Strategic Reconnaissance Wing 1951–1952

=== Larson AFB, Moses Lake, WA (H). ===
- Namesake: Maj Donald A. Larson.
  - 71st Strategic Reconnaissance Wing Fighter 1955–1957
  - 462d Strategic Aerospace Wing 1962–1966
  - 4170th Strategic Wing 1959–1963

=== Laughlin AFB, Del Rio, TX (H). ===
- Namesake: 1st Lt. Jack Thomas Laughlin.
  - 4080th Strategic Recon. Wing 1957–1960.
  - 4080th Strategic Wing 1960–1966

=== Lincoln AFB, Lincoln, NE (H). ===
- 818th Air Division 1954–1962
- 818th Strategic Aerospace Division 1962–1965
  - 98th Bomb Wing 1954–1964
  - 98th Strategic Aerospace Wing 1964–1966
  - 307th Bomb Wing

=== Little Rock AFB, Jacksonville, AR (H). ===
- 825th Air Division 1955–1962
- 825th Strategic Aerospace Division 1962–1970
  - 70th Strategic Reconnaissance Wing 1955–1962
  - 308th Strategic Missile Wing 1961–1987
  - 384th Bomb Wing 1953–1964
  - 43rd Bomb Wing 1964-1970

=== Lockbourne AFB (Rickenbacker AFB 18 May 1974), Columbus, OH (H). ===
- Namesake: Edward Vernon Rickenbacker
- 37th Air Division 1951–1952
- 801st Air Division 1952–1965
  - 26th Strategic Reconnaissance Wing 1952–1958
  - 70th Strategic Reconnaissance Wing 1955
  - 91st Strategic Reconnaissance Wing 1957
  - 301st Air Refueling Wing 1964–1974
  - 301st Bomb Wing 1958–1964
  - 376th Bomb Wing 1957–1965

=== Loring AFB 1 Oct 1954), Limestone, ME. ===
- Namesake: Maj Charles Joseph Loring Jr.
  - 45th Air Division 1954–1971
  - 42d Bomb Wing 1953–1954.
  - 42d Wing 1991–1992

=== Lowry AFB, Denver, CO (H). ===
- Namesake: 1st Lt Francis Brown Lowry.
  - 451st Strategic Missile Wing 1961–1965
  - 703d Strategic Missile Wing 1958–1961

=== MacDill AFB, Tampa, FL (H). ===
- Namesake: Col Leslie MacDill.
  - 8th Air Force 1946
    - 6th Air Division 1951–1961
      - 305th Bomb Wing 1950–1959
      - 306th Bomb Wing 1948–1963
      - 307th Bomb Wing 1947–1965
      - 311th Reconnaissance Group 1946
      - 311th Reconnaissance Wing 1946–1948
      - 498th Bombardment Group 1946

=== (Great Falls AFB) Malmstrom AFB 15 Jun 1956, Great Falls, MT (H). ===
- Namesake: Col Einar Axel Malmstrom,
  - 22d Air Division 1960–1962
  - 40th Strategic Aerospace Division 1989–1991
  - 813th Air Division 1959–1962
  - 813th Strategic Aerospace Division 1962–1966
    - 301st Air Refueling Wing 1988–1992
    - 341st Missile Wing 1991–1992
    - 341st Strategic Missile Wing 1961–1991
    - 407th Strategic Fighter Wing 1956–1957
    - 4061st Air Refueling Wing 1956–1961

=== March AFB, Riverside, CA (H). ===
- Namesake: 2nd Lt Peyton Conway March.
  - Fifteenth Air Force 1949–1992
    - 12th Air Division 1951–1962
      - 1st Fighter Interceptor Wing 1950
      - 1st Fighter Wing 1949–1950
      - 22d Air Refueling Wing 1982–1992
      - 22d Bomb Wing 1949–1982
      - 44th Bombardment Group 1947–1950
      - 44th Bomb Wing 1950–1951
      - 106th Bomb Wing 1951–1952
      - 320th Bomb Wing 1952–1963
      - 330th Bomb Wing 1949–1951
      - 452d Air Refueling Wing 1978–1992

=== Mather AFB, Sacramento, CA (T). ===
- Namesake: 2nd Lt Carl Spencer Mather.
  - 320th Bomb Wing 1963–1989
  - 4134tth Strategic Wing 1958–1963

=== McConnell AFB, Wichita, KS (H). ===
- Namesake: Capt Fred J. McConnell'] and 2nd Lt Thomas Laverne McConnell
  - 42d Air Division 1959–1962
  - 42d Strategic Aerospace Division 1962–1963
    - 381st Strategic Missile Wing 1961–1986
    - 384th Air Refueling Wing 1972–1987
      - 384th Bomb Wing 1987–1991
      - 384th Wing 1991–1992
      - 4347th Combat Crew Training Wing 1958–1963

=== (Pinecastle AFB) McCoy AFB 7 May 1958, Orlando, FL (H). ===
- Namesake: Col Michael Norman Wright McCoy.
  - 42d Air Division 1971–1973
  - 823d Air Division 1968–1971
    - 306th Bomb Wing 1963–1974
    - 321st Bomb Wing 1958–1961
    - 4047th Strategic Wing 1961–1963

=== McGhee Tyson ANGB, Knoxville, TN. ===
- Namesake: Charles McGee Tyson (USNR)
  - 134th Air Refueling Wing 1976–1992

=== McGuire AFB, Wrightstown, NJ (T). ===
- Namesake: Maj Thomas Buchannan McGuire Jr.
  - 91st Strategic Reconnaissance Wing 1948–1949
  - 108th Air Refueling Wing 1991–1992
  - 170th Air Refueling Wing 1977–1992

=== Merced County Airport, Merced CA (H). ===
- 444th Bombardment Group 1946

=== Miami International Airport, Miami FL (T). ===
- 456th Troop Carrier Wing (AF Reserve) 1952–1972

=== Minot AFB, Minot, ND (H). ===
- 57th Air Division 1975–1991
- 810th Air Division 1962
- 810th Strategic Aerospace Division 1962–1971
  - 5th Bomb Wing 1968–1991
  - 5th Wing 1991–1992
  - 906th Air Refueling Squadron 1959-1991
  - 91st Strategic Missile Wing 1968–1992
  - 450th Bomb Wing 1962–1968
  - 455th Strategic Missile Wing 1962–1968
  - 4136th Strategic Wing 1958–1963

=== Moody AFB, Valdosta, GA (T). ===
- Namesake: Maj George P. Moody
  - 146th Fighter – Bomber Wing 1951

=== Mountain Home AFB, Mountain Home, ID (H). ===
- 5th Strategic Reconnaissance Wing 1949
- 9th Bomb Wing 1953–1962
- 9th Strategic Aerospace Wing 1962–1966

=== Naval Air Station Dallas, Dallas, TX. ===
- 136th Air Refueling Wing 1976–1978

=== Offutt AFB, Bellevue, NE (H). ===
- Namesake: 1st Lt Jarvis Offutt.
  - Strategic Air Command HQ 1948–1992
    - 1st Air Division (Meterorological Survey) 1955–1956
    - 5th Air Division 1951
      - 55th Strategic Reconnaissance Wing 1966–1991
      - 55th Wing 1991–1992
      - 385th Strategic Aerospace Wing 1962–1964
      - 544th Aerospace Reconnaissance Tech. Wing 1963–1979
      - 544th Intelligence Wing 1991–1992
      - 544th Strategic Intelligence Wing 1979–1991
      - 3902d Air Base Wing 1979–1986
      - 4231st Strategic Wing 1959–1962
      - 4321st Strategic Wing 1959–1962

=== O’Hare International Airport, Chicago, IL (T). ===
- Namesake: Lieutenant Commander Edward "Butch" O’Hare
  - 126th Air Refueling Wing 1976–1992
  - 928th Troop Carrier Group, Medium, activated on 15 January 1963 (not organized)
  - Organized in the AF Reserve on 11 February 1963
  - Redesignated 928th Tactical Airlift Group on 1 July 1967
  - Redesignated 928th Airlift Group on 1 February 1992
  - Redesignated 928th Airlift Wing on 1 October 1994
  - Inactivated on 1 July 1997

=== (Portsmouth AFB) Pease AFB 7 Sep 1956, Portsmouth, NH (H). ===
- Namesake: Captain Harl Pease Jr.
  - 45th Air Division 1971–1989
  - 817th Air Division 1956–1971
    - 100th Bomb Wing 1956–1966
    - 157th Air Refueling Group/Wing 1975–Present
    - 509th Bomb Wing 1958–1991

=== Peterson AFB Colorado Springs, CO. (T). ===
- Namesake: 1st Lieutenant Edward J. Peterson

=== Phoenix Skyharbor IAP, Phoenix, AZ. ===
- 161st Air Refueling Wing 1976–1992

=== Pinecastle AFB (McCoy AFB 7 May 1958), Orlando, FL (H). ===
- 813th Air Division 1954–1956
  - 19th Bomb Wing 1954–1956
  - 321st Bomb Wing 1953–1958
  - 4047th Strategic Wing 1958–1963
  - 306th Bomb Wing 1963–1974

=== Pittsburgh ANGB, Pittsburgh IAP, Pittsburgh, PA ===
- 112th Air Refueling Wing 1991–1992
- 171st Air Refueling Wing 1976–1992

=== Plattsburgh AFB, Plattsburgh, NY (H). ===
  - 820th Air Division 1956–1962
  - 820th Strategic Aerospace Division 1962–1965
    - 308th Bomb Wing 1959–1961
    - 380th Air Refueling Wing 1991–1992
    - 380th Bomb Wing 1953–1964
    - 380th Bomb Wing 1972–1991
    - 380th Strategic Aerospace Wing 1964–1972
    - 497th Air Refueling Wing 1963–1964
    - 4180th Air Refueling Wing 1960–1963

=== Portsmouth AFB (Pease AFB 7 Sep 1956), Portsmouth, NH (H). ===
- 100th Bomb Wing 1956–1966

=== Presque Isle AFB, Presque Isle, ME (T). ===
- 702d Strategic Missile Wing 1958–1961

=== Rapid City AFB (Ellsworth AFB, 13 Jun 1953), Rapid City, SD (H). ===
- 28th Bomb Wing 1947–1950
- 28th Strategic Reconnaissance Wing 1950–1953

=== Randolph AFB, San Antonio, TX (T). ===
- Namesake: Captain William Millican Randolph
  - 4397th Air Refueling Training Wing 1958–1962

=== (Lockbourne AFB) Rickenbacker AFB 18 May 1974, Columbus, OH (H). ===
- Namesake: Captain Edward "Eddie" V. Rickenbacker
  - 160th Air Refueling Wing 1976–1992
  - 301st Air Refueling Wing 1974–1979

=== Robins AFB, Warner Robins, GA (H). ===
- Namesake: Brigadier General Augustine Warner Robins
  - 19th Air Refueling Wing 1983–1992
  - 19th Bomb Wing 1968–1983
  - 465th Bomb Wing 1962–1968
  - 4137th Strategic Wing 1959–1963

=== Roswell AFB (Walker AFB 19 Jun 1949), Roswell, NM (H). ===
- Namesake: Brigadier General Kenneth Newton Walker
- 33d Fighter Wing 1947–1948
- 509th Composite Group 1946–1947
- 509th Bomb Wing 1947–1949

=== Salt Lake City IAP, Salt Lake City, UT. ===
- 151st Air Refueling Wing 1976–1992

=== Savannah AFS (Hunter AFB), Savannah, GA (H). ===
- 380th Bombardment Group 1947–1949

=== (Smoky Hill AFB) Schilling AFB 16 Mar 1957, Salina, KS. (H). ===
- Namesake: Colonel David C. Schilling
  - 22d Air Division 1962–1963
  - 802d Air Division 1957–1960
    - 40th Bomb Wing 1957–1960
    - 310th Bomb Wing 1957–1962
    - 310th Strategic Aerospace Wing 1962–1965
    - 485th Bombardment Group 1946.

=== Sedalia AFB (Whiteman AFB 3 Dec 1955), Knob Noster, MO (H). ===
- Namesake 2nd Lieutenant George Allison Whiteman
- 340th Bomb Wing 1952–1955

=== Selfridge AFB, Mt. Clemens, MI (H). ===
- Namesake: 1st Lieutenant Thomas E. Selfridge
  - 56th Fighter Wing 1946–1948
  - 4708th Defense (later Air Defense) Wing 1948-1955
  - 1st Fighter Wing (Air Defense) 1955-1969
  - 500th Air Refueling Wing 1963–1964
  - 4045th Air Refueling Wing 1959–1963

=== Seymour Johnson AFB, Goldsboro, NC (H). ===
- Namesake: Lieutenant Seymour Johnson, USN
  - 68th Air Refueling Wing 1986–1991
  - 68th Bomb Wing 1963–1982
  - 4241st Strategic Wing 1958–1963
  - 911th Air Refueling Wing 1958–1986

=== Sheppard AFB, Wichita Falls, TX (H). ===
- Namesake: U.S. Senator Morris E. Sheppard
  - 494th Bomb Wing 1963–1966
  - 4245th Strategic Wing 1959–1963

=== Salina Regional Airport, Smoky Hill AFB (Schilling AFB, 16 Mar 1957), Salina, KS (H). ===
- Namesake: Colonel David C. Schilling
- 802d Air Division 1952–1957
  - 22d Bomb Wing 1948–1949
  - 40th Bomb Wing 1952–1957
  - 97th Bomb Wing 1948
  - 301st Bomb Wing 1947–1949
  - 485th Bombardment Group 1946
  - 550th Strategic Missile Squadron (inactivated 1965)

=== Spokane AFB (Fairchild AFB 20 Jul 1951, Spokane, WA (H). ===
- Namesake: General Muir S. Fairchild
- 92d Bomb Wing 1947–1951
- 90th Bomb Wing 1950–1951
- 111th Strategic Reconnaissance Wing 1951

=== Stead AFB, Reno, NV (T). ===
- Namesake: Lieutenant Croston K. Stead
  - 3904th Composite Wing 1952–1954

=== Tinker AFB, Oklahoma City, OK (T). ===
- Namesake: Brigadier General Clarence L. Tinker
  - 506th Strategic Fighter Wing 1955–1957.

=== Topeka AFB (Forbes AFB 1 Jul 1948), Topeka, KS (H). ===
- 311th Air Division, Reconnaissance 1948–1949
  - 55th Strategic Reconnaissance Wing 1948–1949

=== (Fairfield–Suisun AFB) Travis AFB 21 Apr 1951, Fairfield, CA (H). ===
- Namesake: Brigadier General Robert F. Travis
  - 14th Air Division 1951–1960
    - 5th Bomb Wing 1951–1968
    - 5th Bomb Wing 1955–1968

=== Turner AFB, Albany, GA (H). ===
- Namesake: Lieutenant Sullins Preston Turner
  - 40th Air Division 1951–1957
  - 82d Air Division 1959–1966
    - 12th Fighter Escort Wing 1950
    - 31st Fighter Escort Wing 1950–1953
    - 31st Strategic Fighter Wing 1953–1957
    - 108th Fighter Bomber Wing 1951
    - 484th Bomb Wing 1962–1967
    - 508th Fighter Escort Wing 1952
    - 508th Strategic Fighter Wing 1952–1956
    - 4080th Strategic Recon. Wing 1956–1957
    - 4138th Strategic Wing 1959–1963

=== (Cooke AFB) Vandenberg AFB, Lompoc, CA 4 Oct 1958 (T). ===
- Current Namesake: General Hoyt Sanford Vandenburg
- Original Namesake: General Philip St. George Cooke
  - Twentieth Air Force 1991–1992
    - 1st Missile Division 1958–1961
    - 1st Strategic Aerospace Division 1961–1991
      - 310th Training and Testing Wing 1991–1992
      - 392d Strategic Missile Wing 1961
      - 704th Strategic Missile Wing 1958–1959
      - 4392d Aerospace Support Wing 1961
      - 4392d Aerospace Support Wing 1987–1991

=== (Roswell AFB) Walker AFB 19 Jun 1949, Roswell, NM (H). ===
- Namesake: Brigadier General Kenneth Newton Walker
  - 47th Air Division 1951–1959
    - 6th Bomb Wing 1950–1962
    - 6th Strategic Aerospace Wing 1962–1967
    - 509th Bomb Wing 1949–1958

=== Westover AFB, Chicopee, MA (H). ===
- Namesake: Major General Oscar Westover
  - Eighth Air Force 1955–1970
    - 1st Air Division 1954–1955
    - 57th Air Division 1956–1969
      - 99th Bomb Wing 1956–1974
      - 499th Air Refueling Wing 1963–1966
      - 4050th Air Refueling Wing 1955–1963

=== (Sedalia AFB) Whiteman AFB 3 Dec 1955, Sedalia, MO (H). ===
- Namesake 2nd Lieutenant George Allison Whiteman
  - 17th Air Division 1959–1962
  - 17th Strategic Aerospace Division 1962–1963
  - 17th Strategic Aerospace Division 1965–1971
  - 17th Strategic Missile Division 1963–1965
  - 100th Air Division 1990–1991
    - 340th Bomb Wing 1955–1963
    - 340th Bomb Wing 1958–1970
    - 351st Missile Wing 1991–1992
    - 351st Strategic Missile Wing 1962–1991

=== Wright–Patterson AFB, Dayton, OH (T). ===
- Namesake: Orville & Wilbur Wright and 1st Lieutenant Frank Patterson
  - 17th Bomb Wing 1963–1975
  - 4043d Strategic Wing 1959–1963

=== Wurtsmith AFB, Oscoda, MI (H). ===
- Namesake: Major General Paul Bernard Wurtsmith.
  - 40th Air Division 1959–1988
    - 379th Bomb Wing 1961–1991
    - 379th Wing 1991–1992
    - 4026th Strategic Wing 1958–1961

== Outside of the continental United States ==
=== Andersen AFB, Agana, Guam. ===
- Namesake: Brigadier General James Roy Andersen
  - Eighth Air Force 1970–1975
    - 3d Air Division 1954–1970
    - 3d Air Division 1975–1992
      - 43d Bomb Wing 1986–1990
      - 43d Strategic Wing 1970–1986
      - 72d Strategic Wing (P) 1972–1973
      - 92d Bomb Wing 1954–1955
      - 92d Bomb Wing 1956
      - 99th Bomb Wing 1956
      - 303d Bomb Wing 1956
      - 320th Bomb Wing 1956–1957
      - 509th Bomb Wing 1954
      - 1500th Strategic Wing (P) 1990–1991
      - 3960th Air Base Wing 1955–1956
      - 3960th Strategic Wing 1965–1970
      - 4133d Bomb Wing (P) 1966–1970

=== Hickam AFB, Honolulu, HI (T). ===
- Namesake: Lieutenant Colonel Horace Meek Hickam
  - 3d Air Division 1988–1992

=== Ramey AFB, Aguadilla, PR. ===
- Namesake: General Howard Knox Ramey
  - 55th Strategic Recon. Wing 1950–1952
  - 72d Bomb Wing 1955–1971
  - 72d Strategic Recon. Wing 1952–1955

== Other countries ==
=== Canada ===
==== Ernest Harmon AB, Newfoundland ====
- Namesake: Captain Ernest Emery Harmon
  - 4081st Strategic Wing 1957–1966

==== Goose AB, Labrador ====
- 95th Strategic Wing 1966–1976
- 4082d Strategic Wing 1957–1966
- 37th Air Division
- Goose Air Defense Sector
- Air Transport Command
- 4732d Air Defense Group
- 6603d Air Base Group
- Twenty-First Air Force

=== United Kingdom ===
==== Diego Garcia, Indian Ocean. ====
- 17th Recon. Wing 1982–1992
- 4300th Bomb Wing (P) 1990

==== RAF Alconbury ====
- 17th Reconnaissance Wing 1982–1991

==== RAF Bassingbourn, Royston. ====
- 2d Bomb Group 1951
- 55th Strategic Recon. Wing 1951
- 97th Bomb Group 1950–1951
- 301st Bomb Group 1950–1951

==== RAF Burtonwood, Warrington. ====
- 5th Strategic Recon. Wing 1950

==== RAF Brize Norton. ====
- 11th Bomb Wing 1952
- 43rd Bomb Wing 1953
- 68th Bomb Wing 1958
- 92d Bomb Wing 1958
- 97th Bomb Group 1950–1951
- 301st Bomb Group 1950–1951
- 301st Bomb Wing 1952–1953
- 305th Bomb Wing 1953
- 320th Bomb Wing 1954
- 380th Bomb Wing 1957
- 384th Bomb Wing 1957
- 3920th Strategic Wing 1964–1965
- SAC REFLEX Base 1959–1964

==== RAF Fairford, ====
- 5th Strategic Recon. Wing 1954
- 7th Bomb Wing 1952–1953
- 11th Bomb Wing 1952–1953
- 43d Bomb Wing 1954
- 55th Strategic Recon. Wing 1954
- 303d Bomb Wing 1954
- 306th Bomb Wing 1953
- 806th Bomb Wing (P) 1991
- SAC REFLEX base 1959–1964

11th Strategic Group 1979-1990

==== RAF Greenham Common. ====
- 40th Bomb Wing 1957
- 100th Bomb Wing 1957–1958
- 303d Bomb Wing 1954
- 310th Bomb Wing 1956–1957
- 320th Bomb Wing 1956

==== RAF High Wycombe. ====
- 7th Air Division 1958–1965

==== RAF Lakenheath. ====
- 2d Bomb Group 1948
- 2d Bomb Group 1950
- 7th Bomb Wing 1951
- 22d Bomb Group 1948–1949
- 22d Bomb Group 1949–1950
- 22d Bomb Wing 1951
- 40th Bomb Wing 1955
- 42d Bomb Wing 1955
- 43d Bomb Group 1949
- 55th Strategic Recon. Wing 1954
- 68th Bomb Wing 1954
- 93d Bomb Wing 1952
- 97th Bomb Wing 1952
- 98th Bomb Wing 1955–1956
- 301st Bomb Group/Bomb Wing 1950–1951
- 307th Bomb Group 1948–1949
- 307th Bomb Wing 1956
- 321st Bomb Wing 1954–1955
- 340th Bomb Wing 1955
- 384th Bomb Wing 1957
- 509th Bomb Group 1949
- 509th Bomb Wing 1951
- 509th Bomb Wing 1952
- 705th Strategic Missile Wing 1958
- SAC REFLEX base 1959–1964

==== RAF Manston. ====
- 12th Fighter Escort Wing 1951
- 31st Fighter Escort Wing 1951
- 91st Strategic Recon, Wing 1951

==== RAF Marham. ====
- 2d Bomb Group 1950
- (22d Bomb Group 1949–1950
- 43d Bomb Group 1949
- 93d Bomb Group 1950–1951
- 97th Bomb Group 1948–1949
- 307th Bomb Group 1948
- 307th Bomb Group 1949–1950
- 509th Bomb Group 1949

==== RAF Mildenhall, Mildenhall. ====
- 2d Bomb Group 1950
- 2d Bomb Wing 1951
- 22d Bomb Wing 1951
- 55th Strategic Recon. Wing 1953
- 55th Strategic Recon. Wing 1954
- 93d Bomb Group 1950–1951
- 93d Bomb Group 1951–1952
- 97th Bomb Wing 1952
- 100th Air Refueling Wing 1992
- 306th Strategic Wing 1978–1992
- 509th Bomb Wing 1951
- 509th Bomb Wing 1952

==== RAF Scampton. ====
- 28th Bomb Group 1948
- 301st Bomb Group 1948–1949

==== RAF Sculthorpe. ====
- 2d Bomb Group 1950
- 5th Bomb Group 1950
- 5th Recon. Group 1949–1950
- 5th Strategic Recon. Wing 1950
- 22d Bomb Group 1949–1950
- 22d Bomb Wing 1951
- 43d Bomb Group 1949
- 91st Strategic Recon. Wing 1951
- 92d Bomb Group 1949
- 97th Bomb Group 1950–1951
- 98th Bomb Group 1949
- 301st Bomb Group 1950–1951

==== RAF South Ruislip. ====
- 7th Air Division 1951–1958
  - 705th Strategic Missile Wing 1958–1960

==== RAF Upper Heyford. ====
- 2d Bomb Wing 1952
- 22d Bomb Wing 1953–1954
- 42d Bomb Wing 1955
- 97th Bomb Wing 1956
- 303d Bomb Wing 1954
- 310th Bomb Wing 1955
- 376th Bomb Wing 1955
- 509th Bomb Wing 1956
- 3918th Strategic Wing 1964–1965
- European Tanker Task Force 1970–1992
- SAC REFLEX base 1959–1964

==== RAF Waddington. ====
- 97th Bomb Group 1948–1949
- 97th Bomb Group 1950–1951

==== RAF Wyton. ====
- 2d Bomb Wing 1951
- 97th Bomb Group 1950–1951
- 509th Bomb Wing 1951
- SAC Dispersal Base

=== Egypt ===
==== Cairo ====
- 1706th Air Refueling Wing (P) 1990

=== French Morocco ===
==== Nouasseur AB. ====
- 4310th Air Division 1958–1963

==== Rabat. ====
- 5th Air Division 1951–1954

==== Sidi Slimane AB. ====
- 5th Air Division 1954–1958
  - 4310th Air Division 1958

=== Greece ===
==== Hellinikon AB ====
- 803rd Air Refueling Wing (P)

=== Denmark ===
==== Thule AFB, Thule, Greenland. ====
- 4083d Air Base Wing 1959–1960
- 4083d Strategic Wing 1957–1959

=== Japan ===
==== Kadena AB, Okinawa. ====
- 307th Bomb Wing 1952–1954
- 376th Strategic Wing 1970–1991
- 4252d Strategic Wing 1965–1970

==== Misawa AB, Misawa. ====
- 12th Strategic Fighter Wing 1954
- 27th Fighter Escort Wing/Strategic Fighter Wing 1952–1953
- 31st Strategic Fighter Wing 1953–1954

==== Yokota AB, Tokyo. ====
- 98th Bomb Wing 1953–1954

=== Oman ===
==== Seeb. ====
- 1702d Air Refueling Wing (P) 1990–1991

=== Portugal ===
==== Lajes/Terceira Island ====
- 802d Air Refueling Wing (P) 1990

=== Saudi Arabia ===
==== King Khalid IAP. ====
- 1703d Air Refueling Wing (P) 1990–1991

==== King Abdulaziz International Airport, Jeddah ====
- 1701st Air Refueling Wing(P) 1991
- 1701st Strategic Wing (P) 1990
- 1708th Bomb Wing (P) 1990
- 1709th Air Refueling Wing (P) 1990

==== Riyadh. ====
- 17th Air Division (P) Provisional 24 Aug 1990.
    - 1700th Strategic Wing (P) 1990–1991
    - 1711th Air Redfueling Wing (P)

=== Spain ===
==== Madrid. ====
- Sixteenth Air Force 1957–1958
    - 65th Air Division 1957
      - 7602d Support Wing 1957
      - 3977th Support Wing 1957–1958

==== Moron AB, Seville. ====
- 801st Air Refueling Wing(P) 1990
- 801st Bomb Wing (P) 1991
- 3973d Strategic Wing 1964–1966

==== Torrejon AB, Madrid. ====
- Sixteenth Air Force 1958–1966
  - 65th Air Division 1957–1960
    - 98th Strategic Wing 1966–1976
    - 3970th Strategic Wing 1964–1966

==== Zaragoza AB, Zaragoza. ====
•7603d Air Base Squadron (9-1-1956), reasignado como 3974th Air Base Squadron desde el 1 de enero de 1957.

•431st Fighter-Interceptor Squadron (1958-1964)

•3974th Air Base Group, (1958-1965)

•874th Aircraft Control and Warning Squadron, (1959-1965)

•7602d Support Wing, (1960)

•7472d Combat Support Group, (1964-1970)

•406th Tactical Fighter Training Wing (1970-1992)

•67th Aerospace Rescue and Recovery Squadron - 3 helicópteros UH-1N de apoyo en rescate (hasta 1988)

=== Thailand ===
==== U-Tapao AF, Bangkok. ====
- 17th Air Division 1972
  - 307th Strategic Wing 1970–1975
  - 310th Strategic Wing (P) 1972–1974
  - 4258th Strategic Wing 1966–1970

=== Turkey ===
==== Incirlik. ====
- 804th Air Refueling Wing (P) 1990
- 810th Air Refueling Wing (P) 1990–1991
- 807th Air Refueling Wing (P) 1990

=== United Arab Emirates ===
==== Abu Dhabi ====
- 1712th Air Refueling Wing (P) 1990

==== Dubai ====
- 101st Air Refueling Wing 1990–1991
- 1713 Air Refueling Wing (P) 1990

=== West Germany ===
==== Ramstein AB, Kaiserslautern. ====
- 7th Air Division 1978–1992
  - 306th Strategic Wing 1976–1978
