= Abilene =

Abilene may refer to:

== Places ==
=== United States ===
- Abilene, Kansas
- Abilene, Texas
- Abilene, Texas metropolitan area
- Abilene State Park, near Abilene, Texas
- Abilene Trail, from Texas to Abilene, Kansas, used in the 19th century

=== Elsewhere ===
- Abilene (ancient), a plain in Syria on the eastern slope of Anti-Lebanon mountain range
- Abilene, Alberta, Canada

== Films ==
- Abilene Town, a 1946 western film starring Randolph Scott
- Gunfighters of Abilene, a 1960 film starring Buster Crabbe
- Gunfight in Abilene, a 1967 western film starring Bobby Darin and Leslie Nielsen
- Abilene (film) or Shadows of the Past, a 1999 drama film starring Ernest Borgnine

== Military ==
- Operation Abilene (1966), a joint US-Australian military operation in 1966 during the Vietnam War
- Operation Abilene (2003), a US military operation in Al Anbar province in 2003 during the Iraq War
- USS Abilene (PF-58), a 1943 Tacoma-class US navy frigate named after Abilene, Kansas
- Abilene Trophy, awarded annually to the community in Air Mobility Command

== Other uses ==
- Abilene Christian University, in Abilene, Texas
- Abilene Network, the American national academic backbone network
- Abilene paradox, a form of dysfunctional group dynamics
- Abilene (board game), a 1984 simulation of cattle barons
- "Abilene" (song), 1963, recorded by George Hamilton IV
- "Abilene", a song from Middle of Nowhere by Kacey Musgraves
- Abilene and Smoky Valley Railroad, in Abilene, Kansas
- Abilene and Southern Railway, taken over by Missouri Pacific Railroad in 1978
