= Malmstrom =

Malmstrom or Malmström is a Swedish, Danish and Finnish surname that comes from the word Malm, which means ore, and Strom, a word for current/stream. It may refer to:

== People ==
- August Malmström (1829–1901), Swedish academic painter
- Cecilia Malmström (born 1968), Swedish politician, minister for European Affairs
- Einar Axel Malmstrom (1907–1954), American Air Force pilot, eponym of Malmstrom Air Force Base
- Gustaf Malmström (1884–1970), Swedish wrestler
- Håkan Malmström (born 1977), defender in the Swedish football club
- Henrik Malmström (born 1984), Swedish ice hockey player
- Karl Malmström (1875–1938), Swedish diver
- Louise Malmström (born 1972), Swedish social democratic politician

== Other ==
- Malmstrom Air Force Base, Montana, USA
