= MacDill Air Force Base =

US Air Force base in Tampa, Florida, United States

- Near Tampa, Florida in the United States
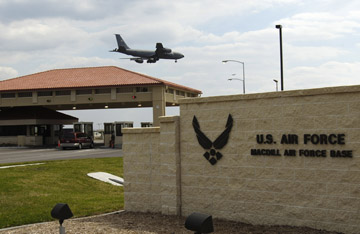
- The main gate at MacDill AFB, with a KC-135R Stratotanker overhead.

Site information
- Type: US Air Force Base
- Owner: Department of Defense
- Operator: US Air Force
- Controlled by: Air Mobility Command (AMC)
- Condition: Operational
- Website: macdill.af.mil

Location
- Location within Florida Location within the United States Location within North America
- Coordinates: 27°50′58″N 082°31′16″W

Site history
- Built: 1939 (as Southeast Air Base, Tampa)
- In use: 1939–present

Garrison information
- Current commander: Colonel Edward V. Szczepanik; Chief Raun M. Howell (command chief)
- Garrison: 6th Air Refueling Wing (Host); 927th Air Refueling Wing

Airfield information
- Identifiers: IATA: MCF, ICAO: KMCF, FAA LID: MCF, WMO: 747880
- Elevation: 14 feet (4 m) AMSL
Runways
Direction	Length and surface
05/23	11,421 feet (3,481 m) Asphalt

MacDill Air Force Base (MacDill AFB) (IATA: MCF, ICAO: KMCF, FAA LID: MCF) is an active United States Air Force installation located 4 miles (6.4 km) south-southwest of downtown Tampa, Florida.

MacDill Air Force Base, located in South Tampa, was constructed as MacDill Field, a U.S. Army Air Corps, later U.S. Army Air Forces, installation just prior to World War II. With the establishment of the U.S. Air Force as an independent service in September 1947, it became MacDill Air Force Base. During the 1950s and 1960s, it was a Strategic Air Command (SAC) installation for B-47 Stratojet bombers. In the early 1960s, it transitioned to a Tactical Air Command (TAC) installation, briefly operating the F-84 Thunderstreak jet fighter before transitioning to the F-4 Phantom II. During the 1960s, 1970s, and early 1980s, it operated F-4 Phantom II fighters under various fighter wings, followed by F-16 Fighting Falcons in the mid-1980s to early 1990s.

MacDill became an Air Mobility Command installation in 1996, with the 6th Air Refueling Wing (6 ARW), assigned to the Eighteenth Air Force of the Air Mobility Command, as the host wing. The wing's 310th Airlift Squadron flies the C-37A, and its 50th Air Refueling Squadron and 91st Air Refueling Squadron fly the KC-135. The 6 ARW is further augmented by the Air Force Reserve Command's 927th Air Refueling Wing and 63d Air Refueling Squadron also flying KC-135s.

MacDill AFB is home to the headquarters for two of the U.S. military's unified combatant commands: Headquarters, United States Central Command, and Headquarters, United States Special Operations Command. Both commands are independent from one another and each is commanded by a respective four-star general or admiral.

Two additional subunified commands are headquartered at MacDill AFB: Commander, United States Marine Corps Forces Central Command, commanded by a three-star general, and United States Special Operations Command Central commanded by a two-star general or admiral.

== History ==
=== Port Tampa Cemetery ===
Port Tampa Cemetery “was one of several African American cemeteries in the area that had been forgotten or purchased for redevelopment,” according to a historical marker established within the base. In 2019, the Air Force received information about the existence of a former African-American graveyard on the grounds of the base from the Tampa Bay History Center. Archival city records indicated that there was a segregation era burial site for Black families between 1840 and 1920. A non-intrusive archaeological survey using ground penetrating radar and cadaver dogs found evidence of a cemetery by a contractor hired by the base. In January 2024, Air force officials announced that potentially 121 unmarked graves had been discovered. The search continues along with outreach to the community on how to best document the site and pay respect to the people buried there.

=== Establishment and name ===
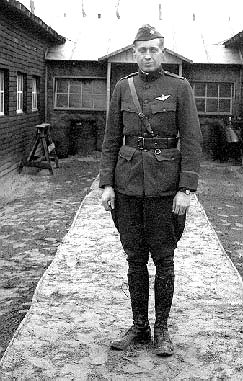
Colonel Leslie MacDill

MacDill AFB was originally established in 1939 as Southeast Air Base, Tampa. It is named in honor of Colonel Leslie MacDill (1889–1938).

=== Initial uses ===
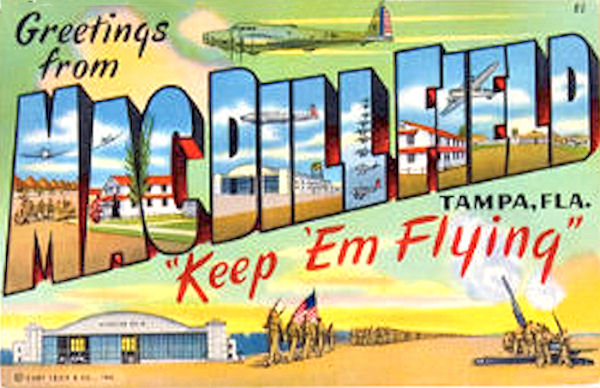
A 1943 MacDill Field large-letter postcard, Curt Teich Company

=== World War II ===
The B-26 earned the slogan "One a day in Tampa Bay" due to the number of early-model B-26 aircraft that ditched or crashed into the Tampa Bay waters surrounding MacDill Field. Early models of the B-26 aircraft proved hard to fly and land by many pilots due to its short wings, high landing speeds, and fighter-plane maneuverability. Improvements to the Block 10 version of the aircraft, known as the B-26B-10, added six feet of additional wingspan and upgraded engines that eliminated most of these problems.

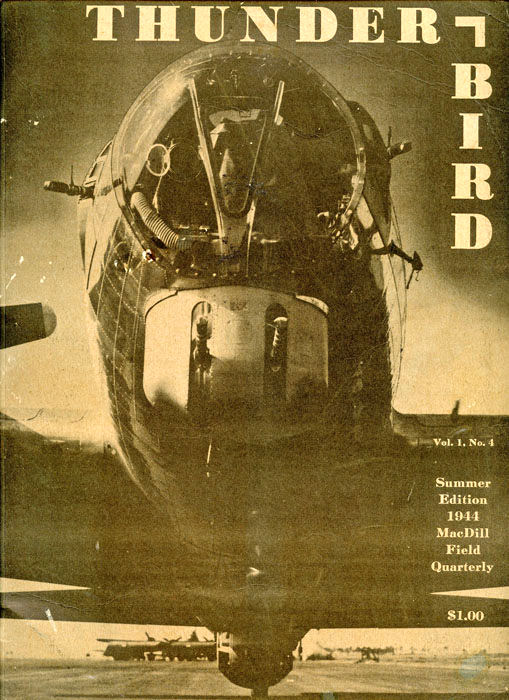
The Thunderbird, a quarterly magazine that was printed at MacDill Army Air Field, Summer 1944 edition

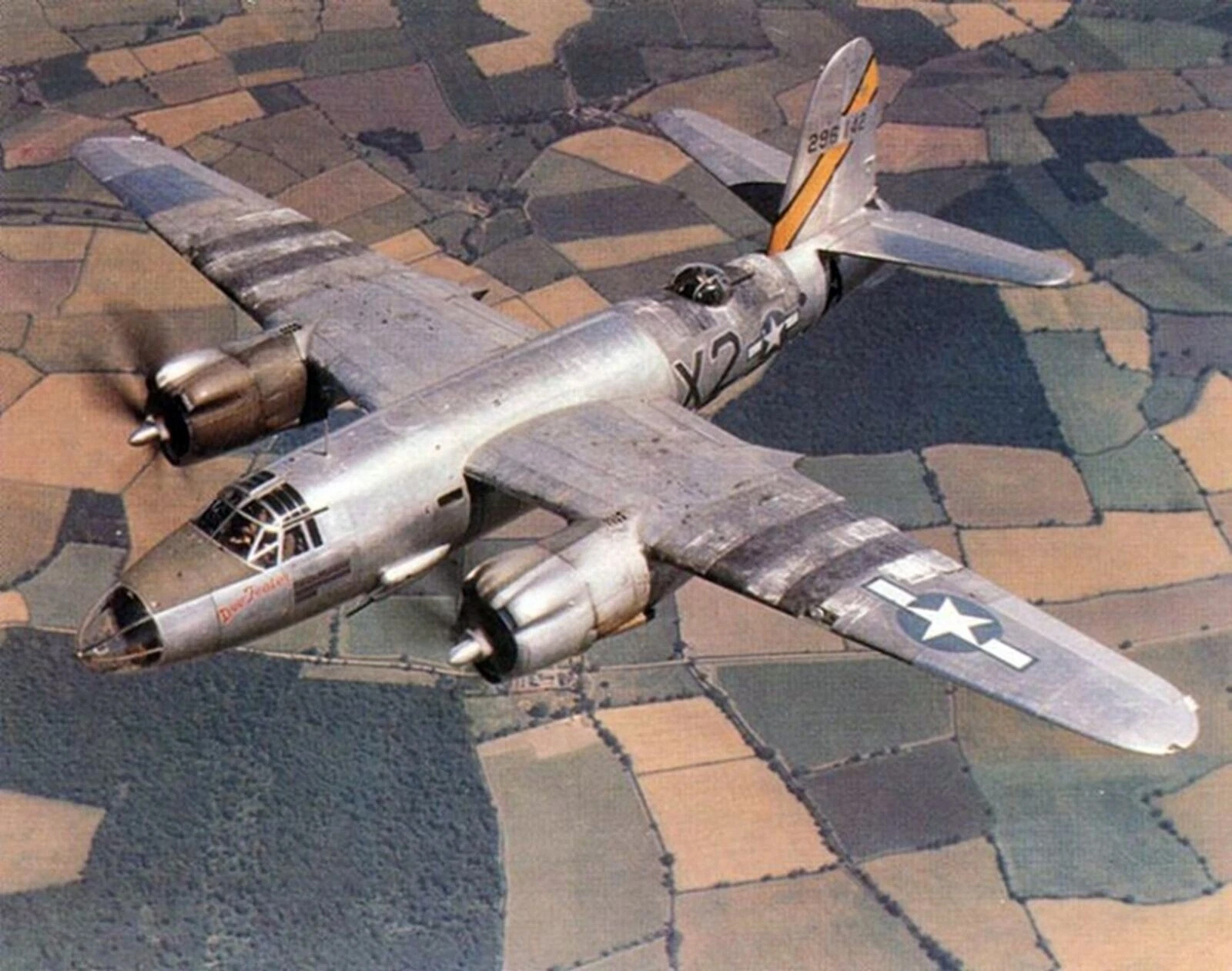
A Martin B-26B Marauder, 397th Bomb Group, over Europe in 1944: The 397th Bomb Group was stationed at MacDill Field in 1943

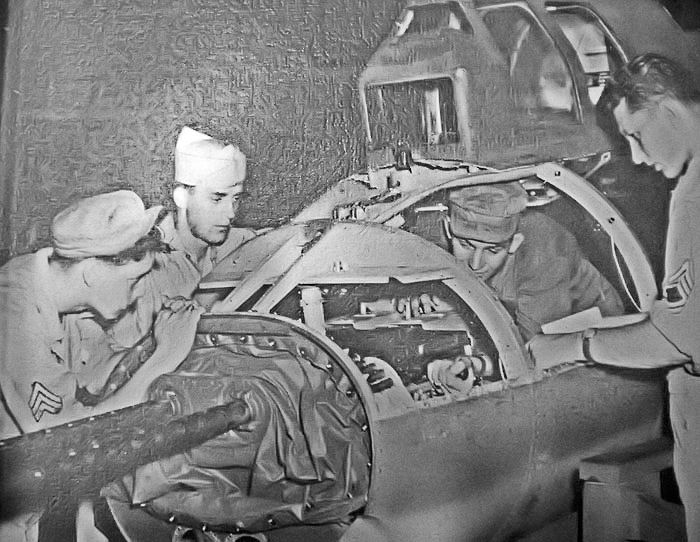
B-17 Tail position maintenance – MacDill AAF Florida – 1944

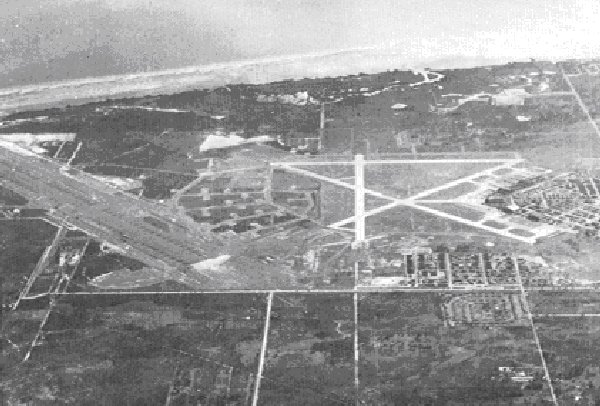
A southern-oriented, inverted image of MacDill Airfield during World War II

=== Strategic Air Command ===
==== 307th Bombardment Group ====
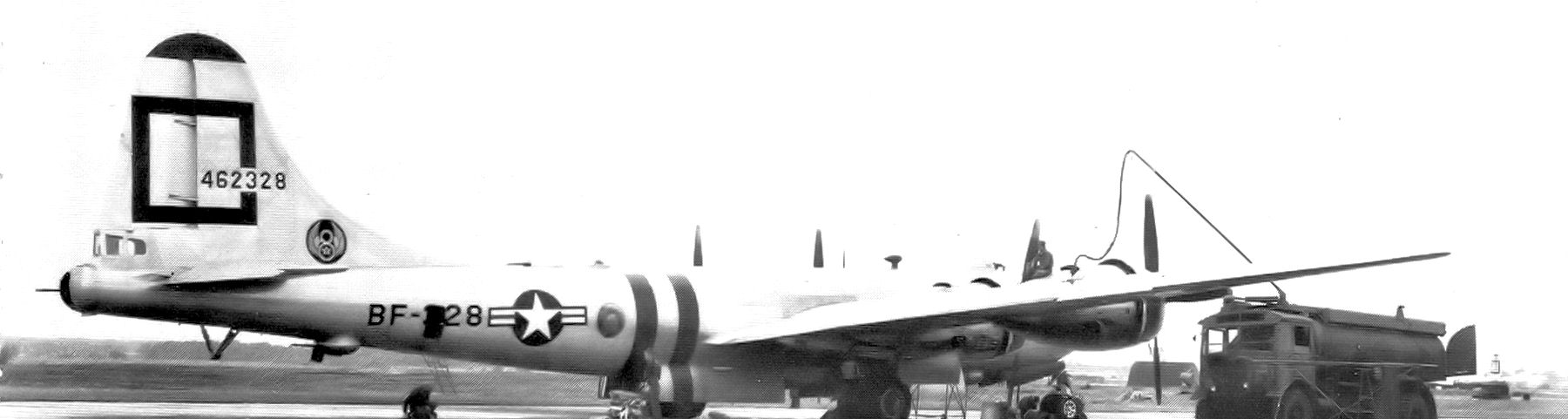
MacDill was a training base for B-29s. A B-29A-75-BN Superfortress at RAF Lakenheath, England, 1948: Note the Black Square SAC postwar tail code, along with the postwar "Buzz Code"

==== 306th Bombardment Wing ====
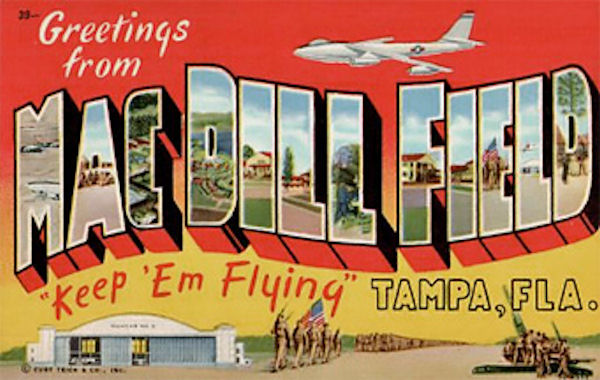
A B-47 era MacDill AFB postcard

Deliveries of the new Boeing B-47A Stratojet to the Air Force and SAC began in December 1950, and the aircraft entered service in May 1951 with the 306th Bombardment Wing.

==== 305th Bombardment Wing ====
The 809th Air Division (809th AD) took over host unit responsibilities for MacDill AFB on 16 June 1952.

In June 1952, the 305th upgraded to the all-jet Boeing B-47B Stratojet.

==== Alert detachment operations ====
Although control of MacDill AFB would pass from SAC to TAC in the early 1960s, SAC continued to maintain a periodic presence at MacDill in the form of dispersal alert operations of B-52 and KC-135 aircraft from other SAC bombardment wings, using the extant SAC Alert Facility at MacDill. These operations continued until the early 1980s.

=== Tactical Air Command ===
The first attempt to close MacDill AFB was made in 1960, when the impending phaseout of SAC's B-47 bombers caused it to be listed as surplus and slated for closure. The 1962 Cuban Missile Crisis highlighted the base's strategic location and its usefulness as a staging area. As a result, the cuts were halted and the base repurposed for a tactical mission with fighter aircraft. In response to the crisis, the United States Strike Command was established at MacDill as a crisis response force. It was one of the first unified commands, a command that draws manpower and equipment from all branches of the U.S. military.

In 1962, MacDill AFB was transferred from SAC to TAC. Bomber aircraft remained home-based at MacDill until the 306th Bombardment Wing's transfer to McCoy AFB. To the 1980s, SAC maintained a tenant presence at MacDill, using their alert facility as a dispersal location for B-52 and KC-135 aircraft. For all practical purposes, the 1960s marked MacDill's transition from a bomber-centric SAC base to a fighter-centric TAC installation. Under TAC, MacDill AFB remained a fighter base for almost 30 years, but other changes went on in the background.

==== 15th Tactical Fighter Wing ====
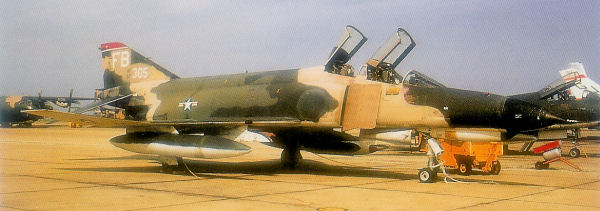
A McDonnell Douglas F-4E-35-MC Phantom II of the 43d TFS

On 17 April 1962, the 15th Tactical Fighter Wing was activated at MacDill and assigned to 9th Air Force. Initially equipped with the F-84F Thunderjet, in 1964 the 15th TFW upgraded to the tail-coded McDonnell-Douglas F-4C Phantom II. In 1970, U.S. Strike Command was renamed United States Readiness Command.

==== Cuban Missile Crisis ====
From MacDill, there were planned napalm and rocket attacks against surface-to-air missile sites at Mariel and Sagua La Grande, as well as the airfields at Santa Clara, Los Banos, and San Julien.

==== 1st Tactical Fighter Wing ====
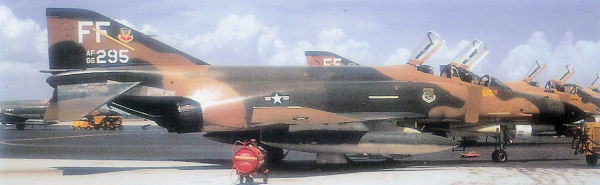
A McDonnell F-4E-31-MC Phantom II of the 94th TFS.

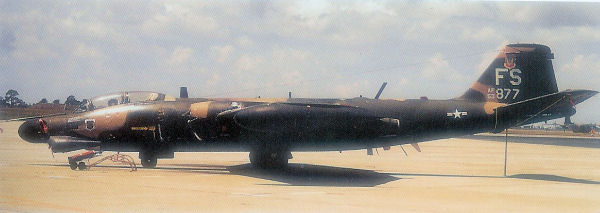
A Martin B-57G-MA of the 4530th CCTS.

On 10 January 1970, the 1st Tactical Fighter Wing was reassigned without personnel or equipment to MacDill. In 1972, the 1st TFW standardized all of its aircraft with the common wing tail code "FF".

==== 56th Tactical Fighter Wing / 56th Tactical Training Wing ====
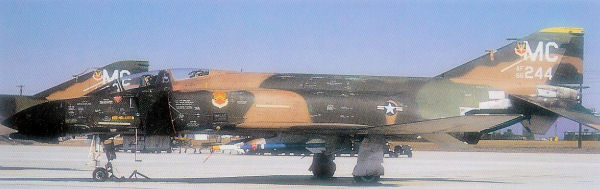
A McDonnell F-4D-29-MC Phantom II of the 61st TFS

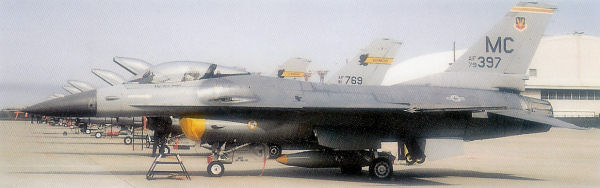
A General Dynamics F-16A Block 10B Fighting Falcon of the 61st TFS

In 1980, the new Rapid Deployment Joint Task Force was activated, and in 1983, it became United States Central Command. Also in 1987, United States Special Operations Command was activated at MacDill AFB, occupying the former facilities of USREDCOM.

At Super Bowl XVIII and again at Super Bowl XXV, both played at Tampa Stadium, 56th Tactical Training Wing aircraft performed the flyover and missing man formation after the national anthem.

=== After Cold War and BRAC 1991 ===
By the early 1990s and the end of the Cold War, the U.S. was looking to downsize the military and eliminate a large number of bases in the United States as a cost-savings measure. MacDill AFB figured prominently in this; the Tampa area had seen substantial increases in commercial air traffic at the two international airports within 10 nautical miles of MacDill, creating hazardous conditions for F-16 training, and the noise associated with the high-performance jets was deemed unsuitable for high-density residential areas such as those around MacDill. As a result, the 1991 Defense Base Realignment and Closure Commission (BRAC) ordered that all flight-line activities cease at MacDill AFB by 1993.

As a result of the BRAC decision, the F-16 training mission and the 56th Fighter Wing were moved without personnel or equipment to Luke Air Force Base, outside of Phoenix, Arizona, and was reassigned to Air Education and Training Command.

==== 6th Air Mobility Wing and 927th Air Refueling Wing (Associate) ====
In August 1992, just prior to the landfall of Hurricane Andrew in southern Florida, the 31st Fighter Wing (31 FW) and the Air Force Reserve's 482d Fighter Wing, both based at Homestead AFB, executed an emergency hurricane evacuation of all of their flyable F-16C and F-16D aircraft, with the bulk of those aircraft temporarily staging at MacDill. Given the level of destruction at Homestead AFB, these fighter aircraft remained at MacDill for several months thereafter.

In 1993, with the help of local Representative Bill Young (R-FL), the flight-line closure order for MacDill was rescinded and the National Oceanic and Atmospheric Administration transferred from their former aircraft operations center at Miami International Airport to Hangar 5 at MacDill AFB, to use the base and its flight line as their new home station for weather reconnaissance and research flights.

In January 1994, the Air Combat Command's 6th Air Base Wing (6 ABW) stood up at MacDill AFB to operate the base and provide support services for the large and growing number of tenant units, and to provide services for transient air units. Later that year, the base served as the primary staging facility for Operation Uphold Democracy in Haiti.

This staging was considered evidence of the quality and usefulness of the MacDill runway and flight line, even in light of the high civilian air traffic levels in the Tampa Bay area from nearby Tampa International Airport, St. Petersburg-Clearwater International Airport, and Peter O. Knight Airport. With further congressional prodding and lobbying, MacDill was chosen as the site for a KC-135 air refueling mission. With the arrival of 12 KC-135R tankers and the 91st Air Refueling Squadron from Malmstrom Air Force Base, Montana, the 6 ABW was renamed the 6th Air Refueling Wing (6 ARW) in October 1996 and transferred from ACC to the Air Mobility Command (AMC).

In January 2001, the 310th Airlift Squadron (310 AS) was activated at the base, flying the CT-43A and EC-135Y. The CT-43 provided executive transport to the commander of United States Southern Command in Miami. The EC-135s provided executive transport and airborne command post capabilities to the commanders of USCENTCOM and USSOCOM at MacDill. New C-37A aircraft were delivered starting in 2001, and the CT-43 and EC-135s were removed from service. The 310th's primary mission is dedicated airlift support for the commanders of USCENTCOM, USSOCOM, and USSOUTHCOM. With the addition of the 310 AS, the wing was given its current designation as the 6th Air Mobility Wing (6 AMW).

In April 2008, pursuant to BRAC action, the Air Force Reserve Command's 927th Air Refueling Wing relocated from Selfridge Air National Guard Base, Michigan, to MacDill AFB, where it became an associate wing to the 6 AMW, also flying KC-135R aircraft.

==== Tenant units ====
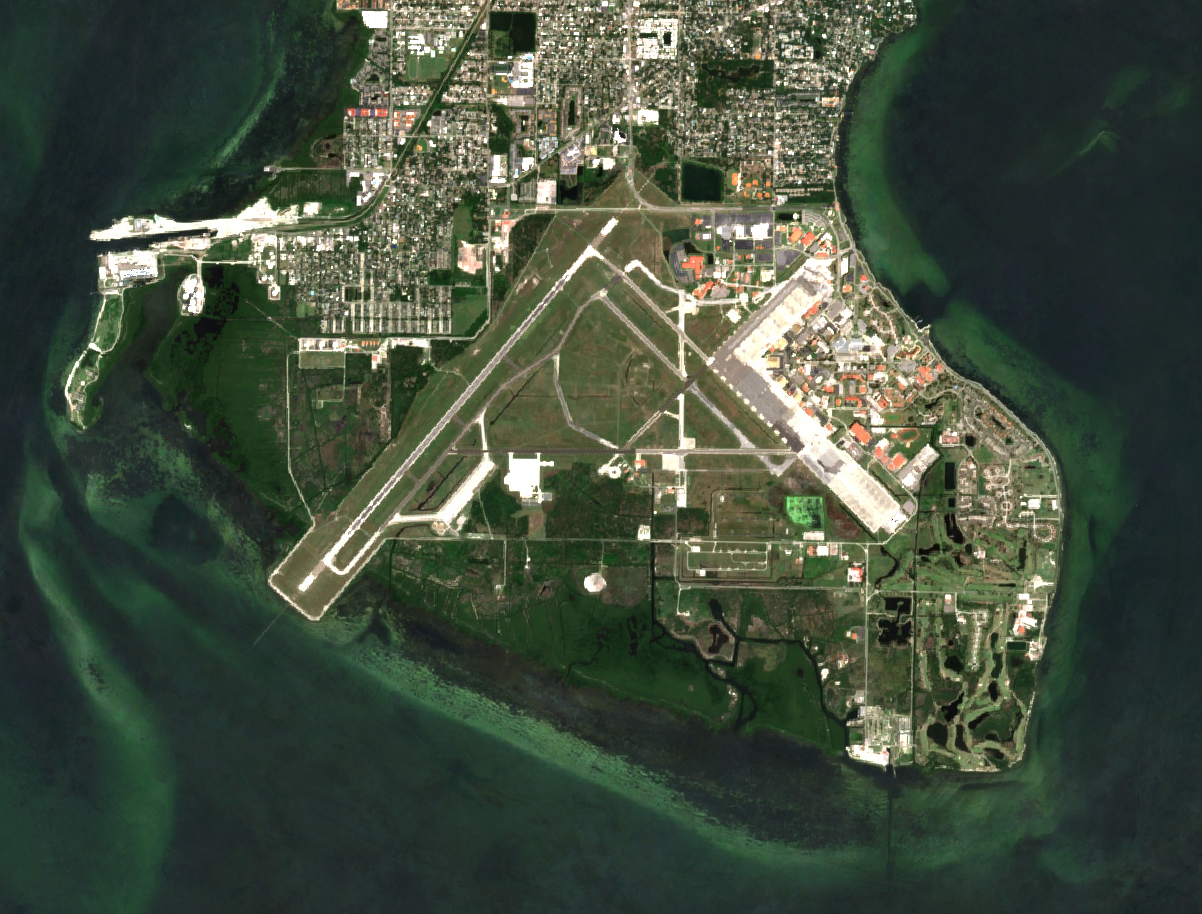
A satellite image composite of MacDill Air Force Base, 2024

In late 2003/early 2004, U.S. Naval Forces Central Command vacated its Tampa "rear headquarters" at MacDill AFB, a complex that was established in the early 1990s following the first Gulf War and commanded by a flag officer, either an upper half or lower half rear admiral concurrently assigned as the USNAVCENT/US 5th Fleet Deputy Commander (DEPCOMUSNAVCENT/DEPCOMFIFTHFLT), and his staff when they were not forward deployed to the Persian Gulf region. In vacating the MacDill AFB facility, all USNAVCENT staff activities were consolidated at COMUSNAVCENT/COMFIFTHFLT headquarters in Manama, Bahrain.

NAVCENT's facility at MacDill AFB was subsequently turned over to the Deputy Commander, U.S. Marine Forces Central Command (DEPCOMUSMARCENT), and his staff. It later became the overall Headquarters, U.S. Marine Forces Central Command. The Commanding General for MARCENT (COMUSMARCENT) remained a dual-hatted function of the Commanding General, I Marine Expeditionary Force (I MEF) at Camp Pendleton, California.

From late 2003 until 2012, the Commanding General remained in California, while his MARCENT staff primarily resided at MacDill AFB, with an additional forward element at Naval Support Activity Bahrain in Manama, Bahrain. In 2012, the COMUSMARCENT and CG I MEF billets were broken into separate billets. COMUSMARCENT took up full-time residency in MARCENT's headquarters facility at MacDill AFB, upgrading the facility to a 3-star headquarters. This continued until 2021 when MARCENT was downgraded to a 2-star headquarters.

Also in late 2004/early 2005, Naval Reserve Center Tampa vacated its obsolescent waterfront location in downtown Tampa, consolidated with the former Naval Reserve Center St. Petersburg adjacent to Coast Guard Air Station Clearwater, and relocated to a newly constructed facility on the south side of MacDill AFB. In 2006, this facility was renamed Navy Operational Support Center Tampa, concurrent with the shift in name of the U.S. Naval Reserve to the U.S. Navy Reserve and its greater integration into the Fleet and shore establishment of the Regular Navy.

Under the command of an active duty full-time support (FTS) U.S. Navy Captain with a staff of approximately 40 active duty FTS officer and enlisted personnel, NOSC Tampa provided administrative support for all of the +/- 1000 part-time Navy Reserve personnel assigned to both local independent Navy Reserve units at NOSC Tampa and to the joint and service commands and activities at MacDill AFB, CGAS Clearwater and Marine Corps Reserve Center Tampa. In late 2021, the facility was renamed Navy Reserve Center Tampa and the FTS personnel redesignated back to their historical designation as Training and Administration of the Reserve (TAR) personnel.

The Joint Communications Support Element (JCSE) is a joint command headquartered at MacDill AFB that deploys to provide en route, early entry, scalable command, control, communications and computer (C4) support to the geographical Unified Combatant Commands, the U.S. Special Operations Command, and other military commands and U.S. Government agencies as directed. On order, JCSE provides additional C4 services within 72 hours to support larger Commander, Joint Task Force/Commander, Joint Special Operations Task Force (CJTF/CJSOTF) headquarters across the full spectrum of operations.

JCSE is commanded by a U.S. Army Colonel. It consists of a Headquarters Support Squadron (HSS), a Communications Support Detachment (CSD), three active-duty joint communications squadrons: the 1st, 2nd and 3rd Joint Communications Squadrons, and the 4th Joint Communications Squadron, the 4th being a U.S. Army Reserve squadron. All are located on the JCSE compound at MacDill AFB.

JCSE includes two additional joint communications support squadrons from the Air National Guard: the 224th Joint Communications Support Squadron (224 JCSS) of the Georgia Air National Guard in Brunswick, Georgia, and the 290th Joint Communications Support Squadron (290 JCSS) of the Florida Air National Guard located in its own compound separate from JCSE at MacDill AFB.

As mentioned above, the 290th Joint Communications Support Squadron (290 JCSS) of the Florida Air National Guard is another tenant unit at MacDill AFB. The 290 JCSS provides Chairman of the Joint Chiefs of Staff-directed globally deployable, en route, and early entry communications support to geographic combatant commands, the United States Special Operations Command, individual U.S. armed services, other Department of Defense activities and combat support agencies, other U.S. Government agencies, and the State of Florida.

The squadron deploys modular, scalable support to large Joint and Combined War-fighting Command and Control (C2) headquarters nodes. Under its Title 10 USC "Federal" mission, the 290 JCSS is associated with the U.S. Transportation Command's Joint Enabling Capabilities Command (JECC) and the Joint Communications Support Element (JCSE). As a USAF organization, the 290 JCSS is operationally gained by the Air Mobility Command (AMC). Under its Title 32 USC "state" mission, the squadron reports to the Governor of Florida via the Assistant Adjutant General for Air (ATAG-Air) and The Adjutant General (TAG) of the Florida National Guard.

The newest tenant command at MacDill AFB is the 598th Range Squadron (598 RANS), an Air Combat Command (ACC) unit that was activated at the MacDill AFB Auxiliary Field at Avon Park Air Force Range, Florida in September 2015. The 598 RANS replaced Detachment 1, 23d Fighter Group, which had previously managed the range and additional facilities at MacDill AFB. The 598 RANS operates both the Avon Park Air Force Range (APAFR) and the 23rd Wing Deployed Unit Complex (DUC) located at MacDill AFB.

The DUC is a separate flight line facility on the west side of MacDill AFB for transient military flight crews, maintenance crews and fighter and attack aircraft utilizing the APAFR. This permits visiting squadrons to have ready access to APAFR while concurrently taking advantage of the billeting, messing and aircraft maintenance support capabilities at MacDill AFB. This combination of facilities between MacDill AFB and the APAFR provides extensive, diversified and convenient training airspace and ranges with unique training capabilities for military air, ground and air-to-ground training. The squadron's higher headquarters, the 23d Fighter Group, is located at Moody Air Force Base, Georgia.

In September 2019, the 310th Airlift squadron inactivated. The squadron had operated three C-37A Gulfstream V and provided global special assignment airlift missions (SAAM) in support of the commanders of the unified combatant commands. As a result, with its primary mission now aerial refueling, the 6th Air Mobility Wing was re-designated as the 6th Air Refueling Wing.

==== Super Bowl flyovers ====
The flyover and Missing man formations for Super Bowl XXV, Super Bowl XXXV and Super Bowl XLIII, played at Raymond James Stadium, came from KC-135 aircraft from MacDill's 6th Air Mobility Wing, with additional flyovers by a B-2 Spirit from the 509th Bomb Wing and F-22 Raptor aircraft from the 325th Fighter Wing. The former flyover was the first Super Bowl flyover to be telecast in high definition.

==== Cyber and information warfare ====
As the home for USSOCOM, the unified combatant command that holds authority over the command and control of U.S.-based special operations forces, as well as the home of SOCCENT, the geographic command responsible for executing special operations in the Central Command area of responsibility, MacDill has been used to conduct psychological operations, also referred to as Military Information Support Operations (MISO) including propaganda and information warfare. According to Reuters, a facility within MacDill "remains the Pentagon’s clandestine propaganda factory."

In early 2011, several news outlets, primarily in the United Kingdom, reported that Ntrepid, a California software and hardware company, had been awarded a $2.76 million U.S. government contract to create false online personas to counter the threat of terrorism and could possibly run their operation from MacDill AFB.

=== BRAC 2005 ===
In its 2005 Base Realignment and Closure (BRAC) Recommendations, the DoD recommended to realign Grand Forks Air Force Base, North Dakota. It distributed the 319th Air Refueling Wing's KC-135R aircraft to the 6th Air Mobility Wing (6 AMW) at MacDill AFB, FL (four aircraft) and several other installations, increasing the number of KC-135R aircraft assigned to the 6 AMW from twelve to sixteen aircraft. Concurrent with this BRAC decision, the 6 AMW hosted a Reserve association with the Air Mobility Command-gained 927th Air Refueling Wing (927 ARW) of the Air Force Reserve Command (AFRC). The latter of which was realigned and relocated from Selfridge ANGB, Michigan to MacDill AFB.

Under the Reserve Associate arrangement, both the 6 AMW and the 927 ARW would share the same KC-135R aircraft, while the 927 ARW would turn over their KC-135R aircraft to the 127th Wing (127 WG) of the Michigan Air National Guard at Selfridge ANGB. The 927 ARW began relocation from Selfridge ANGB to MacDill AFB in 2007 and formally established itself at MacDill in April 2008.

=== Additional KC-135 Aircraft for 6 AMW / 927 ARW ===
Long range USAF plans in the 2015 defense budget called for MacDill AFB to add eight additional KC-135R aircraft to its extant sixteen KC-135Rs in FY2018. The 6 AMW would also increase manning by approximately 300 personnel. These additional KC-135R aircraft would come from other Air Force, Air Force Reserve Command and Air National Guard units transitioning to the KC-46A Pegasus aerial refueling aircraft and the timeline would be contingent on those other units completing their transition and achieving operational capability with the KC-46.

=== Departure of NOAA Aircraft Operations Center ===
Until mid-2017, MacDill AFB also hosted the Aircraft Operations Center (AOC) of the National Oceanic and Atmospheric Administration (NOAA). Commissioned officers of the NOAA Corps and NOAA civil servants fly "Hurricane Hunter" missions in NOAA's WP-3D Orion and Gulfstream IV aircraft, as well as other research missions in these and other assigned fixed-wing and rotary-wing aircraft.

With the anticipated increase in KC-135R aircraft, to include establishment of a second air refueling squadron, and the need for additional maintenance hangar space, the Air Force informed NOAA in 2016 that they would no longer be able to host the NOAA Aircraft Operations Center, its aircraft, and the 110 NOAA personnel in Hangar 5 and its adjacent operations building at MacDill AFB. In May 2017, NOAA began relocation to a new facility at Lakeland Linder International Airport, northeast of MacDill AFB, completing same in June 2017.

=== Airshow ===
MacDill historically hosted an annual air show and "open house" enjoyed by thousands of spectators each year. There were no shows in 2002 and 2003 due to security concerns following the attacks on the United States of 11 September 2001 and the initiation of Operation Iraqi Freedom in 2003. The 2006 show was also canceled due to security concerns on base, but was reinstated in 2008. It was cancelled again in 2013 due to defense budget constraints, but was reinstated again in 2014 as a biennial event. AirFest 2016 was the first-ever airshow to feature a live webcast of the performers, including the headline act of the United States Air Force Thunderbirds.

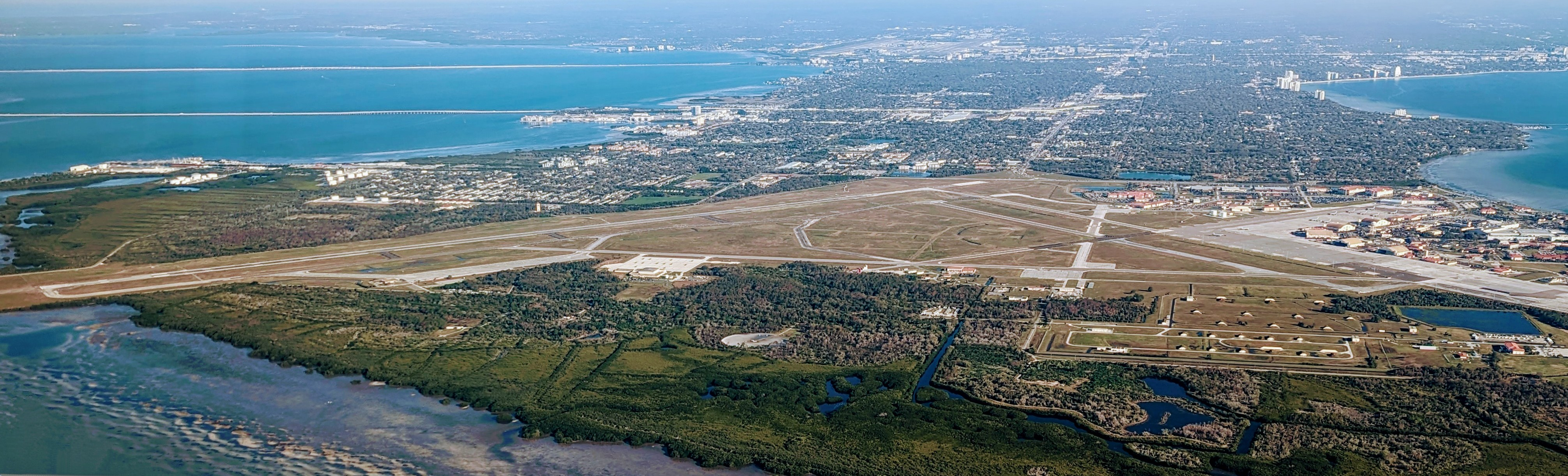
MacDill Air Force Base, seen from a commercial aircraft arriving at Tampa International Airport.

=== Previous names ===
- Established as Southeast Air Base, Tampa, c. 24 May 1939
- MacDill Field, 1 December 1939 (formally dedicated, 16 Apr 1941)
- MacDill Air Force Base, 13 January 1948

=== Major commands to which assigned ===
- GHQ Air Force, 8 April 1940
- Third Air Force, 21 July 1942
- Continental Air Forces, 16 April 1945 (redesignated Strategic Air Command, 21 March 1946)
- Tactical Air Command, 1 July 1962
- Air Combat Command, 1 June 1992
- Air Mobility Command, 4 January 1994–present

=== Base operating units ===
- 27th Air Base Squadron, 11 March 1940
- 27th Air Base Group, 1 September 1940
- 28th Base HQ and Air Base Squadron, c. 15 July 1942
- MacDill Field Base Detachment, 13 December 1943
- 326th AAF Base Unit, 1 May 1944
- 307th Airdrome Group, 15 August 1947
- 307th Air Base Group, 12 July 1948
- 306th Air Base Group, 1 September 1950
- 809th Air Base Group, 16 June 1952 (redesignated 809th Combat Support Group, 1 January 1959)
- 306th Combat Support Group, 1 June 1959
- 836th Combat Support Group, 1 July 1962
- 15th Combat Support Group, 8 June 1969
- 1st Combat Support Group, 1 October 1970
- 56th Combat Support Group, 1 July 1975
- 6th Mission Support Group, 4 January 1994–present

=== Major units assigned ===
==== World War II ====
- HQ, Southeast Air District (later: Third Air Force), 18 December 1940 – January 1941
- HQ, III Bomber Command, 15 December 1941 – 8 April 1946
- 3d Bombardment Wing, 3 October 1940 – 5 September 1941
- 53d Pursuit Group, 15 January – 8 May 1941 (P-40)
- 29th Bombardment Group, 21 May 1940 – 25 June 1942 (B-17/B-18 Antisubmarine Patrols)
- 21st Bombardment Group, 27 June 1942 – 10 October 1943 (B-26 OTU)
- 336th Bombardment Group, 15 July – 10 August 1942; 13 October – 6 November 1943 (B-26 RTU)
- 488th Bombardment Group, 1 November 1943 – 1 May 1944 (B-17 RTU)

Re-designated: 326th Army Air Forces Base Unit (Heavy Bombardment) 1 May 1944 – 30 June 1944
Re-designated: 326th Army Air Forces Base Unit (Separation Station)

- 89th Combat Crew Training Wing, 19 June 1944 – 8 April 1946 (Reconnaissance Training)
- 11th Photographic Group, January-5 October 1944
- 323d Combat Crew Training Wing, 22 February 1945 – 4 August 1946 (Very Heavy Bomber)

==== World War II Training Units Assigned ====
- HQ XII Bomber Command, 13 March – 31 August 1942 (Deployed to England)
- 19th Bombardment Wing, 24 July – 28 September 1942 (Deployed to Egypt)
- 12th Bombardment Wing, 8 September 1942 – 28 November 1943 (Deployed to England)
- 13th Bombardment Wing, 1 October 1942 – 10 May 1943 (Deployed to England)
- 14th Bombardment Wing, 1 October 1942 – 9 May 1943 (Deployed to England)
- 20th Bombardment Wing, 1 November 1942 – 8 May 1943 (Deployed to England)
- 98th Bombardment Wing, 2 October 1940 – 5 September 1941 (Deployed to England)
- 44th Bombardment Group, 15 January 1941 – 15 February 1942 (B-24 Antisubmarine Patrols)
- 92d Bombardment Group, 26 March–May 1942 (B-17 1st Level Training)
- 91st Bombardment Group, 16 May – 26 June 1942 (B-17 1st Level Training)
- 99th Bombardment Group, 1–29 June 1942 (B-17 Organized)
- 94th Bombardment Group, 15 June – 1 July 1942 (B-17 Organized)
- 323d Bombardment Group, 21 August – 2 November 1942 (B-25 2d Level Training)
- 386th Bombardment Group, 1 December 1942 – 9 February 1943 (B-26 1st Level Training)
- 387th Bombardment Group, 1 December 1942 – 12 April 1943 (B-26 1st Level Training)
- 463d Bombardment Group, 5 November 1943 – 3 January 1944 (B-17 2d Level Training)
- 483d Bombardment Group, 7 November 1943 – 2 March 1944 (B-17 2d/3d Level Training)

==== Postwar units ====
- 311th Reconnaissance Wing, 17 April 1946 – 31 May 1947
- 8th Bomber Command, 14 May – 10 November 1946
- Eighth Air Force, 7 June – 1 November 1946
- Tactical Air Command, 21 March – 26 May 1946

==== United States Air Force ====
- 307th Bombardment Wing, 15 August 1947 – 16 May 1951 (B-29, B-50)
- 306th Bombardment Group, 1 August 1948 – 16 June 1952 (B-29, B-50)
- 306th Bombardment Wing, 1 September 1950 – 1 April 1953 (B-50)

1 January 1959 – 1 March 1963 (B-47A/B/E, KC-97)

- 305th Bombardment Wing, 2 January 1951 – 1 June 1959 (B-29, B-50, B-47B/E)
- 4750th Air Defense Wing, 25 June 1959 – 25 June 1960

17th Tow Target Squadron, 11 June 1959 – 15 June 1960 (B-57E)

- 12th Tactical Fighter Wing, 25 April 1962 – 8 November 1965 (F-4C)
- 15th Tactical Fighter Wing, 1 July 1962 – 1 October 1970 (F-4C/D)
- 836th Air Division, 1 July 1962 – 30 June 1971
- 1st Tactical Fighter Wing, 1 October 1970 – 30 June 1975 (F-4E)
- 56th Tactical Fighter Wing, 30 June 1975 – 4 January 1994 (F-4D/E, F-16A/B/C/D)
- 6th Air Mobility Wing, 4 January 1994–present (KC-135R, EC-135Y, CT-43A, C-37A)
- 927th Air Refueling Wing (Associate), 1 April 2008 – present (KC-135R)

== Role and operations ==
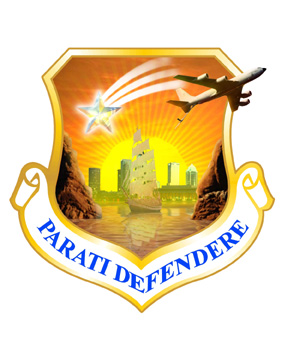
6 AMW / MacDill AFB emblem showing a KC-135 Stratotanker of the 6 AMW with the Tampa Skyline and Gasparilla ship in the background.

The 6 ARW has a collocated Air Force Reserve "Associate" wing at MacDill, the 927th Air Refueling Wing (927 ARW) of the Air Force Reserve Command (AFRC). The 6 ARW and the 927 ARW operate and share the same assigned KC-135R Stratotanker aircraft.

The 6 AMW's 3,000-person force organized into four groups, in addition to the wing commander's immediate staff.

Approximately 15,000 people work at MacDill Air Force Base. A significant number of military personnel and their families live on base in military housing. Remaining service-members and military families live off base in the Tampa Bay area. MacDill AFB is a significant contributor to Tampa's economy and the city is very supportive of the military community. In 2001 and 2003, the Tampa Bay area was awarded the Abilene Trophy, which annually honors the most supportive Air Force city in Air Mobility Command.

The base has a large visitor lodging facility known as the MacDill Inn, a DECA commissary, an AAFES base exchange, and numerous Morale, Welfare and Recreation (MWR) activities, such as the Surf's Edge all ranks club, a base swimming pool, a movie theater, marina, the Raccoon Creek Family Camp for recreational vehicles, the SeaScapes Beach House and the Bay Palms Golf Course.

In June 2024, Reuters reported that a secret propaganda campaign to disparage the Chinese COVID-19 vaccine in the developing world was conducted from MacDill AFB using fake social media accounts.

In December 2021, the Air Force announced that the 6th Air Refueling Wing would re-equip with 24 of the new Boeing KC-46 Pegasus aerial refueling aircraft in the coming years.

=== 6th Air Refueling Wing ===
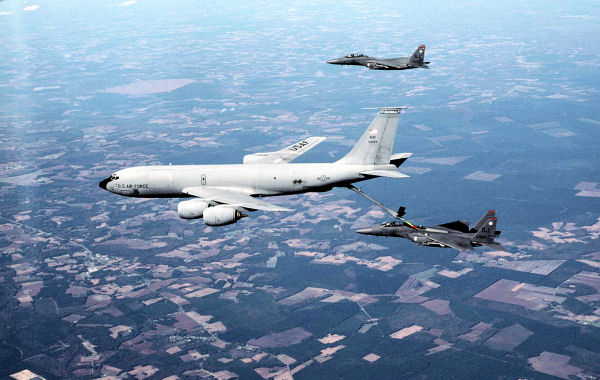
An F-15E from Seymour Johnson Air Force Base, NC receives fuel from a 91st Air Refueling Squadron KC-135R.

The 6 ARW consists of:

- 6th Operations Group (6 OG)
  - 91st Air Refueling Squadron (91 ARS)
    Operates the Boeing KC-135R Stratotanker, conducting worldwide aerial refueling/air mobility support.
  - 50th Air Refueling Squadron (50 ARS)
    Established as an additional air refueling squadron in the 6 AMW in October 2017. Operates the Boeing KC-135R. Stratotanker.
  - 911th Air Refueling Squadron (911 ARS)
    The 911 ARS is a geographically separated unit (GSU) of the 6 AMW, operating the KC-135R Stratotanker as an "active associate" squadron with the Air Force Reserve Command's 916th Air Refueling Wing (916 ARW) at Seymour Johnson AFB, NC. The 911 ARS flies the 916 ARW's aircraft, supporting US military operations worldwide.
  - 99th Air Refueling Squadron (99 ARS)
    The 99 ARS is a GSU of the 6 AMW, operating the KC-135R Stratotanker as an "active associate" squadron with the Alabama Air National Guard's 117th Air Refueling Wing (117 ARW) at Birmingham Air National Guard Base, AL. The 99 ARS flies the 117 ARW's aircraft, supporting US military operations worldwide.
  - 6th Operations Support Squadron (6 OSS)
    Provides airfield management responsibilities for MacDill AFB, to include staffing and operation of the air traffic control tower, weather forecasting services, transient alert services and other flight operations and aircrew support functions.
- 6th Maintenance Group (6 MXG)
  - 6th Aircraft Maintenance Squadron
  - 6th Maintenance Squadron
  - 6th Maintenance Operations Squadron
- 6th Medical Group (6 MDG)
  - 6th Medical Operations Squadron
  - 6th Aerospace Medicine Squadron
  - 6th Dental Squadron
  - 6th Medical Support Squadron
- 6th Mission Support Group (6 MSG)
  - 6th Communications Squadron
  - 6th Civil Engineering Squadron
  - 6th Comptroller Squadron
  - 6th Contracting Squadron
  - 6th Logistics Readiness Squadron
  - 6th Force Support Squadron
  - 6th Security Forces Squadron
- 6th Air Mobility Wing Staff Agencies (e.g., Safety, Wing Plans, Legal, Chaplain, Public Affairs, Historian, etc.)

=== 927th Air Refueling Wing ===
The 927 ARW is an associate unit of the 6th Air Refueling Wing of the Air Mobility Command (AMC), with both wings sharing and flying the same Boeing KC-135R Stratotanker aircraft. Ground support personnel augment their active duty counterparts in the 6 AMW. The 927 ARW is part of the 4th Air Force (4 AF) of Air Force Reserve Command (AFRC).

If mobilized to active duty, the wing is operationally-gained by Air Mobility Command (AMC). The 927 ARW has approximately 1,000 personnel consisting of part-time Traditional Reservists (TR) and full-time Air Reserve Technicians (ART) and Active Guard and Reserve (AGR).

The 927 ARW is commanded by Colonel Douglas Stouffer and the wing's Command Chief Master Sergeant is CMSgt Michael Klausutis.

The 927 ARW consists of:

- 927th Operations Group (927 OG)
  - 45th Aeromedical Evacuation Squadron
  - 63d Air Refueling Squadron (63 ARS)
    Operates the Boeing KC-135R Stratotanker. The KC-135R is a long-range aerial refueling (e.g., tanker) aircraft capable of refueling a variety of other aircraft in mid-air, anywhere in the world and under any weather conditions.
  - 927th Operations Support Squadron (927 OSS)
    Augments the 6 OSS in airfield management responsibilities for MacDill AFB, to include staffing and operation of the air traffic control tower, weather forecasting services, transient alert services and other flight operations and aircrew support.
- 927th Maintenance Group (927 MXG)
  - 927th Aircraft Maintenance Squadron
  - 927th Maintenance Squadron
- 927th Mission Support Group (927 MSG)
  - 927th Logistics Readiness Squadron
  - 927th Force Support Squadron
  - 927th Security Forces Squadron
- 927th Air Refueling Squadrons not assigned to a group
  - 927th Aerospace Medicine Squadron
  - 927th Aeromedical Staging Squadron
- 927th Air Refueling Wing Staff Agencies (e.g., Safety, Wing Plans, Comptroller, Legal, Chaplain, Public Affairs, Historian, etc.)

=== Other major tenant units ===
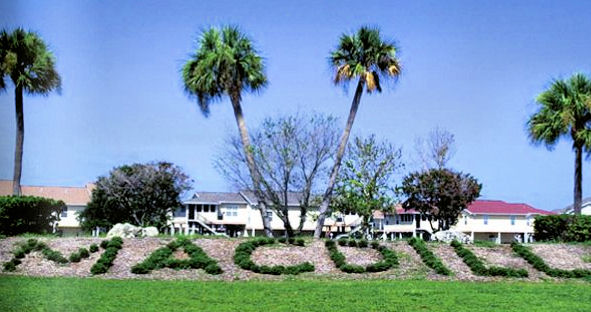
A hedge at MacDill AFB

MacDill has 28 "mission partners" (tenant units) according to the official MacDill AFB website. Among these are:

- Headquarters, United States Central Command (USCENTCOM)
- Headquarters, United States Special Operations Command (USSOCOM)
- Headquarters, United States Marine Forces Central Command (MARCENT)
- Headquarters, United States Special Operations Command Central (SOCCENT)
- Navy Operational Support Center Tampa (NOSC Tampa)
  - subordinate unit of the United States Navy Reserve (USNR)
- Joint Communications Support Element (JCSE)
  - subordinate unit of the Joint Enabling Capabilities Command (JECC)
- 598th Range Squadron (598 RANS) of the 23d Wing of the Air Combat Command (ACC)
  - Geographically separated unit (GSU) of the 23d Fighter Group (23 FG), 23d Wing (23 WG), at Moody AFB, Georgia
- 290th Joint Communications Support Squadron (290 JCSS)
  - subordinate unit of the Florida Air National Guard (FL ANG)
- Joint Special Operations University (JSOU)
- Joint Forces Staff College (JFSC) Satellite Campus
  - Geographically separated field activity of JFSC at Naval Support Activity Hampton Roads, Virginia
- a division of the National Geospatial-Intelligence Agency (NGA)
- Precision Measurement Equipment Laboratory (PMEL), a government-owned/contractor operated (GOCO) field activity of the Air Force Primary Standards Laboratory under the Air Force Metrology and Calibration Program Office (AFMETCAL)
- Florida Area Office and the MacDill AFB Resident Office of the U.S. Army Corps of Engineers

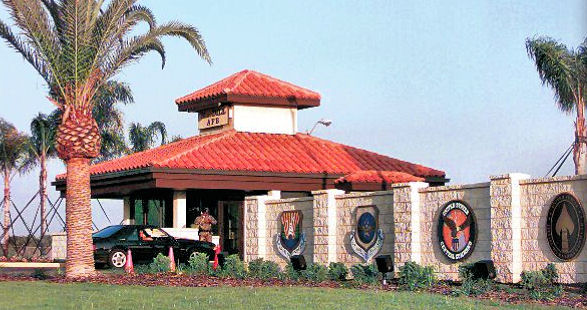
The Main Gate Entrance before updates

Previously designated as Detachment 1 of the 23rd Wing (23 WG) until August 2014 and Det 1 of the 23d Fighter Group (23 FG) until August 2015, the 598 RANS is unique among MacDill AFB's tenant units. It operates both (1) the Deployed Unit Complex (DUC) at MacDill AFB, providing a separate flight line facility and support infrastructure for detachments of USAF, U.S. Navy, U.S. Marine Corps (to include Reserve and Air National Guard) and NATO/Allied fighter, attack and special operations aircraft utilizing the nearby Avon Park Air Force Range (APAFR) facility, and (2) operates and maintains the entire 20,000 square mile APAFR facility approximately 65 miles east of MacDill AFB. An Air Combat Command (ACC) organization, the 598 RANS reports to the Commander, 23d Fighter Group, at Moody Air Force Base, Georgia.

MacDill AFB supports other Active Component and Reserve Component military activities and personnel of the U.S. Army, U.S. Navy, U.S. Marine Corps, U.S. Air Force and U.S. Coast Guard in the West Central Florida/Tampa Bay Region, as well as the large military retiree community in the Tampa Bay area and surrounding environs.

== Based units ==
Flying and notable non-flying units based at MacDill Air Force Base.

Units marked GSU are Geographically Separate Units, which although based at MacDill, are subordinate to a parent unit based at another location.

=== United States Air Force ===
Air Mobility Command

- 6th Air Refueling Wing (Host wing)
  - 6th Operations Group
    - 6th Operations Support Squadron
    - 50th Air Refueling Squadron – KC-135R Stratotanker
    - 91st Air Refueling Squadron – KC-135R Stratotanker
  - 6th Maintenance Group
    - 6th Aircraft Maintenance Squadron
    - 6th Maintenance Squadron
  - 6th Medical Group
    - 6th Healthcare Operations Squadron
    - 6th Medical Operations Squadron
    - 6th Medical Support Squadron
  - 6th Mission Support Group
    - 6th Civil Engineer Squadron
    - 6th Communications Squadron
    - 6th Contracting Squadron
    - 6th Force Support Squadron
    - 6th Logistics Readiness Squadron
    - 6th Security Forces Squadron

Air Force Reserve Command (AFRC)

- 927th Air Refueling Wing
  - 927th Aerospace Medicine Squadron
  - 927th Aeromedical Staging Squadron
  - 927th Operations Group
    - 45th Aeromedical Evacuation Squadron
    - 63rd Air Refueling Squadron – KC-135R Stratotanker
    - 927th Operations Support Squadron
  - 927th Maintenance Group
    - 927th Aircraft Maintenance Squadron
    - 927th Maintenance Squadron
  - 927th Mission Support Group
    - 927th Force Support Squadron
    - 927th Logistics Readiness Squadron
    - 927th Security Forces Squadron

Air Combat Command (ACC)

Air National Guard (ANG)

- Florida Air National Guard
  - 290th Joint Communications Support Squadron

=== United States Navy ===
United States Navy Reserve

- Navy Operational Support Center - Tampa

=== United States Marines ===
United States Marine Forces Central Command

- Headquarters United States Marine Forces Central Command

=== United States Space Force ===
United States Space Forces – Central

- Headquarters United States Space Forces Central

United States Space Forces - Special Operations Command

- Headquarters United States Space Forces Special Operations Command

=== Defense Intelligence Agency ===
National Intelligence University

- National Intelligence University Southern Academic Center

=== Department of Defense ===
United States Central Command

- Headquarters United States Central Command
- Regional Joint Intelligence Training and Education Facility

United States Special Operations Command

- Headquarters United States Special Operations Command
- Headquarters United States Special Operations Command Central
- Joint Special Operations University

United States Transportation Command

- Joint Enabling Capabilities Command
  - Joint Communications Support Element

National Defense University

- Joint Forces Staff College (GSU)

== Education ==
General Clarence Tinker K-8 School

The school district for on-post children is Hillsborough County Public Schools.

The zoned schools for dependent children living on-post are General Clarence Tinker K-8 School, located on-post, and Thomas Richard Robinson High School. By 2015, what used to be Tinker Elementary was expanded into having middle school grades.

== Incidents ==
On May 24, 2012, a Canadair CC-144A Challenger 600 (144601) of the RCAF hit a large turkey vulture on approach to MacDill. The plane landed safely with no fatalities. Temporary repairs were made to the radome and forward bulkhead before it was ferried back to Canada on July 10. The plane was fully repaired.

In March 2026, two Chinese nationals were charged in federal court with leaving an improvised explosive device outside the MacDill base visitor center. One of the two was arrested while the other fled to China.

== See also ==
- Florida World War II Army Airfields
- List of United States Air Force installations
- List of USAF Aerospace Defense Command General Surveillance Radar Stations

== Other sources ==
- This article incorporates public domain material from the Air Force Historical Research Agency
- This article incorporates public domain material from MacDill Air Force Base. United States Air Force.
- Maurer, Maurer (ed.). Air Force Combat Units of World War II. Washington, DC: U.S. Government Printing Office 1961 (republished 1983, Office of Air Force History, ISBN 0-912799-02-1).
- Ravenstein, Charles A. Air Force Combat Wings Lineage and Honors Histories 1947–1977. Maxwell Air Force Base, Alabama: Office of Air Force History 1984. ISBN 0-912799-12-9.
- Mueller, Robert, Air Force Bases Volume I, Active Air Force Bases Within the United States of America on 17 September 1982, Office of Air Force History, 1989 ISBN 0-912799-53-6
- Martin, Patrick (1994). Tail Code: The Complete History of USAF Tactical Aircraft Tail Code Markings. Schiffer Military Aviation History. ISBN 0-88740-513-4.
- Rogers, Brian (2005). United States Air Force Unit Designations Since 1978. Hinkley, England: Midland Publications. ISBN 1-85780-197-0.
- Cornett, Lloyd H. and Johnson, Mildred W., A Handbook of Aerospace Defense Organization 1946 – 1980, Office of History, Aerospace Defense Center, Peterson Air Force Base, Colorado
- Winkler, David F. (1997), Searching the skies: the legacy of the United States Cold War defense radar program. Prepared for United States Air Force Headquarters Air Combat Command.
- USAAS-USAAC-USAAF-USAF Aircraft Serial Numbers—1908 to present
