= History of Felts Field =

Airfield in the United States

Coordinates: 47.683°N 117.323°W

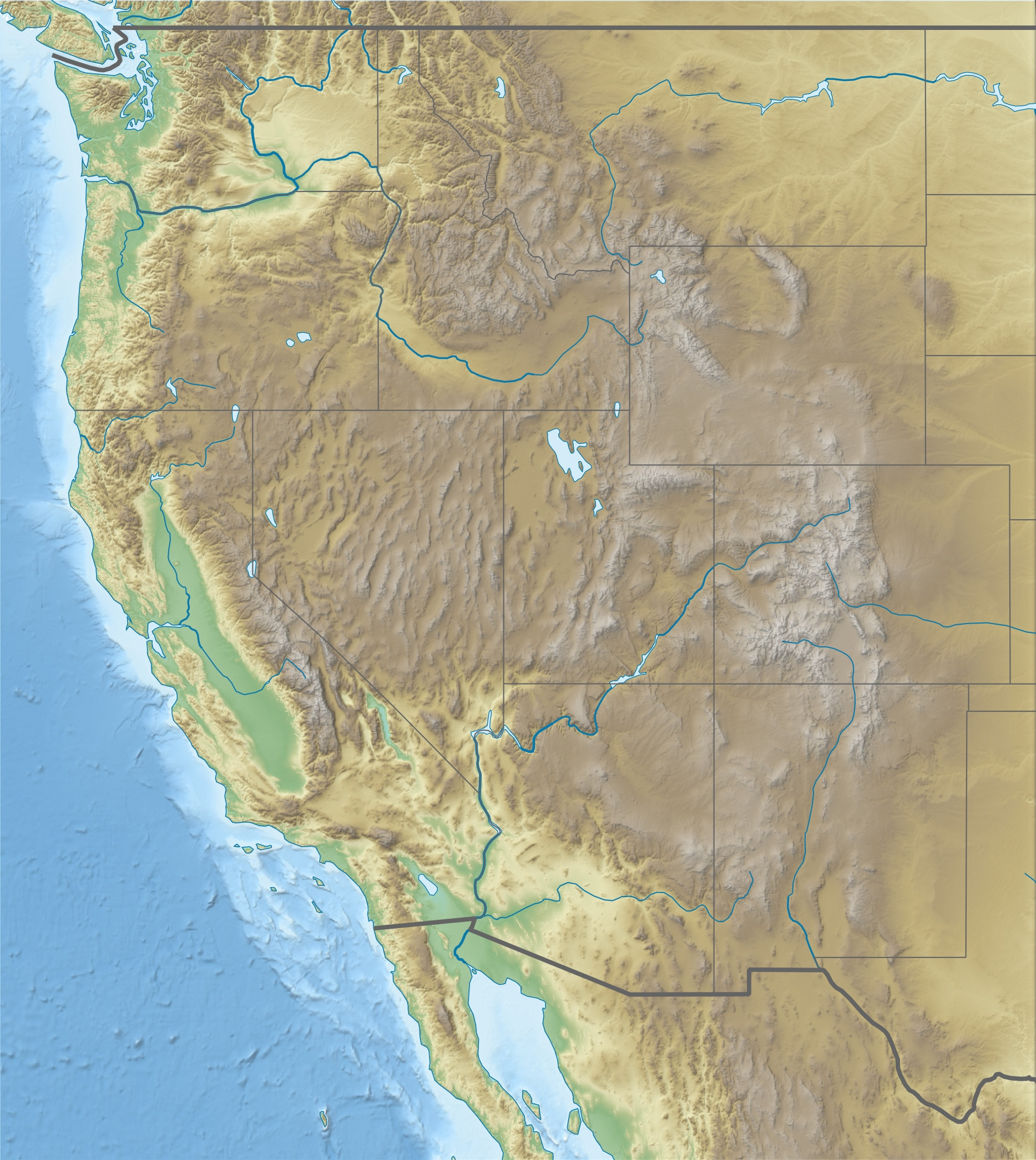
Location in the western United States
Location in Washington

Felts Field is an historic active airfield near Spokane, Washington, United States, on the south bank of the Spokane River.

Aviation activities began there 112 years ago in 1913. In 1920, then called the Parkwater airstrip, was designated a municipal flying field at the instigation of the Spokane Chamber of Commerce. In 1926, the U.S. Department of Commerce officially recognized Parkwater as an airport, one of the first in the West.

Parkwater Aviation Field was the location for flight instruction, charter service, airplane repair, aerial photography, headquarters of the 116th Observation Squadron of the Washington Air National Guard, and eventually the first airmail and commercial flights in and out of Spokane.

In September 1927, in conjunction with Spokane's National Air Derby and Air Races, the airport was renamed Felts Field for James Buell Felts (1898–1927) of Opportunity. A Washington Air National Guard aviator and publisher of the Spokane Valley Herald, Lieutenant Felts and his passenger were killed in a crash of a Curtiss Jenny near the field that May.

After World War II, commercial air traffic moved to Geiger Field (later Spokane International Airport). Felts Field remains a busy regional hub for private and small-plane aviation and related businesses and services. In 1991 it was designated Felts Field Historic District on the National Register of Historic Places

== Parkwater Airstrip ==
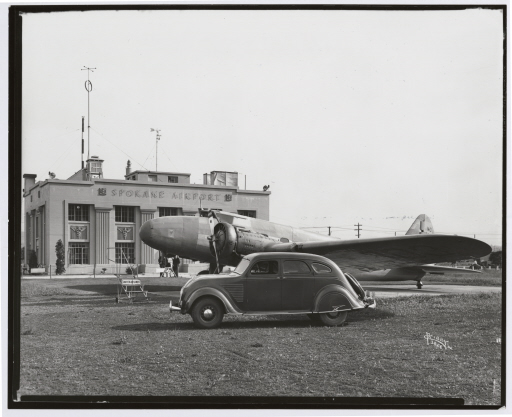
United Airlines Boeing 247 at Spokane Airport (Felts Field) in 1934

The area was a leveled stretched, city-owned property near the area called Parkwater, which temporarily became the name of the airfield as well. Prior to 1913, Spokane's early aviators and exhibition flyers from elsewhere had used a variety of locations, including the fairgrounds east of the city and Glover Athletic Field along the river at the west end of downtown. In 1920, the year the Parkwater airstrip was designated a municipal flying field, the area had not been entirely cleared of stones, and during 1922 and 1923, "Spokane County chronic drunk and nonsupport prisoners [were allowed] ‘field exercise’ by removing stones from the flying field".

Parkwater Field was the scene of several historic aviation events in Spokane during the 1920s. In 1924, Spokane beat other Washington cities to become the headquarters of the state's Air National Guard/116th Observation Squadron. The Guard designated its portion of Parkwater Field as Camp Earl Hoisington. Spokane aviation boosters staged a successful Air Show in 1925.

== Felts Field ==
In September 1927 the airfield was renamed Felts Field. That month there were two major events: on September 12, the landing of Charles Lindbergh during a nationwide tour in his Spirit of St. Louis, and from September 21 to 25, Spokane's Air Derby and National Air Races, one of the first and most successful of such events in the United States.

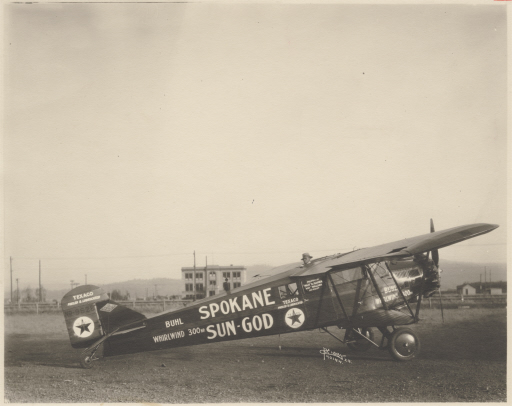
Spokane Sun-God at Felts Field in 1929

In August 1929, Felts Field hosted the spectacular cross-country endurance flight by Nick Mamer in his Buhl Airsedan biplane named Spokane Sun-God. Mamer and his mechanic and co-pilot, Art Walker, were in the air continuously for 120 hours (five days) and covered 7,200 miles (11,600 km), with the plane refueled in flight. Their feat of endurance established several United States records.

Commercial aviation activities of the 1920s, many extending into the 1930s, included the Inland-Eaglerock Sales Company, the Bigelow Johnson School of Aviation, Mamer Air Transport and Flying Service, the Spokane Aviation Company, Spokane Airways, and others. Several hangars were built during this period, and local aviators formed enthusiastic flying clubs.

The late 1920s saw the beginning of the "Tin Goose" era, during which the fragile biplanes and monoplanes of plywood and cloth gave way to enclosed metal aircraft capable of carrying more passengers. These big Ford tri-motors flew out of Felts Field until the mid-1930s, though not always successfully. The first of the three Spokane Airways tri-motors crashed on nearby Moran Prairie southeast of Spokane on November 23, 1928, killing four Spokane flyers; another aboard died two days later.

== Airmail and Passenger Service ==
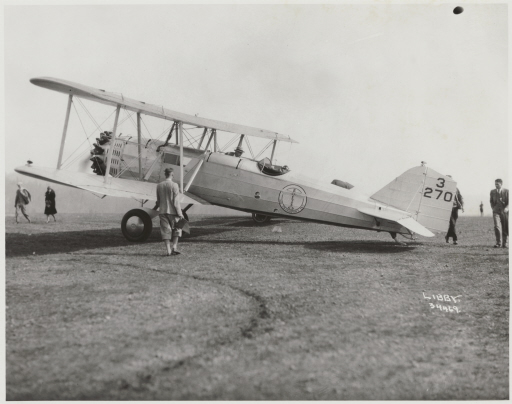
Boeing Air Transport B-40 at Felts Field on September 23, 1927

An important development of the late 1920s was the coming of airmail service to Spokane. By 1926, Pasco already had airmail service through Varney Airlines, a forerunner of United, and "Spokane was envious." The Chamber of Commerce launched a publicity campaign and commissioned a survey of the route. The first direct airmail flight from Spokane took place in 1929 on Sunday, September 15.

Prior to the 1930s, various companies at Felts Field had provided passenger service mainly on a charter basis. Modern passenger service from Felts Field began during the early 1930s, first with United Airlines, a consolidation of Varney, Boeing Air Transport, and several other airlines. United's early Spokane service utilized the ten-passenger Boeing 247, an all-metal twin-engine transport.

Northwest Airways of Saint Paul, Minnesota, soon added Spokane to its "Northern Tier" route that Spokane's Nick Mamer had proven feasible in the late 1920s. Both United and Northwest had passenger and administrative operations in the art deco terminal building constructed in 1932 and eventually serving 137 cities. Mamer Air Transport could not compete with United and Northwest, so Nick Mamer sold his planes and hangar and went to work for Northwest as Western Operations Manager and chief pilot on the Twin Cities to Seattle route that he had pioneered. In 1934, it became Northwest Airlines and, with its fleet of Lockheed and, later, Douglas planes, was soon the major carrier out of Spokane.

== Pioneers of Flight ==
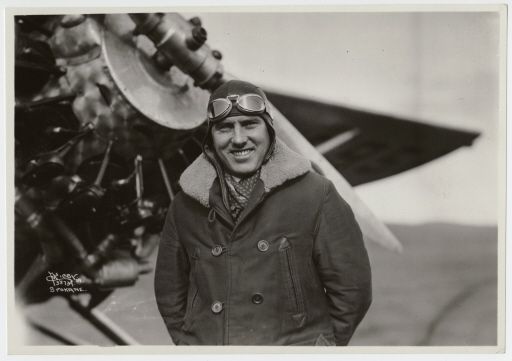
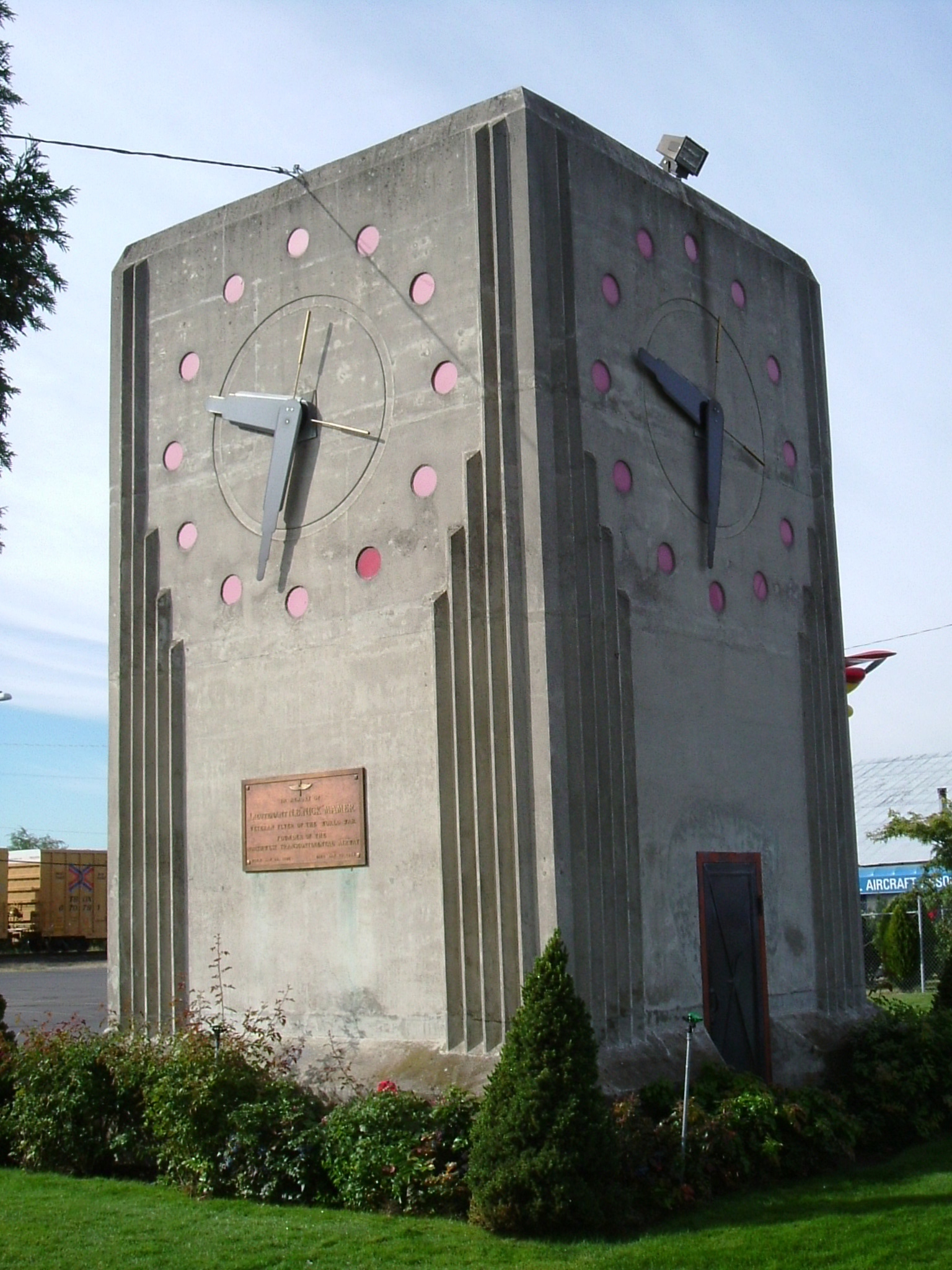
Nick Mamer and the clock that was dedicated in his honor

On January 10, 1938, Nick Mamer, his co-pilot, and eight passengers were killed in the crash of Northwest Airlines Flight 2, a Lockheed Super Electra, in the Bridger Mountains of Montana, near Bozeman. On May 30, 1939, the Mamer Memorial Clock was dedicated at Felts Field.

In addition to the men, a number of Spokane women learned to fly at Felts Field. The women, excluded from the men's air races and derbies, hosted their own "All Women's Air Frolic" at Felts Field in 1936. Female aviators from all over the Northwest competed in stunt flying, racing, and exhibition flying. The event was marred by several crashes, but no fatalities.

During the 1930s, considerable improvement had been made at Felts Field with Civil Works Administration funds and Works Progress Administration labor.

== The Shift to Geiger Field ==
Beginning early in World War II, Felts Field was used as a training site for the Civilian Pilot Training Program while continuing to serve as the municipal airport. The skies and runways were becoming crowded, and, by the late 1930s, the Spokane Chamber of Commerce had realized the need for a larger, more modern airport, a "super airport," to keep up with Spokane's position as a regional transportation and business center. The chamber convinced the Civil Aeronautics Administration and the two airlines serving Spokane to conduct a survey to determine the location. County commissioners agreed to purchase the recommended land west of the city.

Concurrently, city leaders proposed to the federal government that Felts Field be used as an Army Air Corps installation. The War Department turned down this proposal in favor of the 1,280 acres already under development as the new "super airport," officially called the Sunset Airport (or Sunset Field).

On 28 February 1941, the headquarters staff of the Northwest Air District moved from Felts Field to new headquarters offices at Fort George Wright. From there the air activities of eleven northwest states would be directed. Headquarters for the 5th Bomb Wing would remain at Felts until the completion of Sunset Field.

A new north runway was placed in service at Felts Field the last week of June 1942.

With the departure in January 1944 of a WAC detachment and photo charting units for Lowry Field, Colorado, Felts Field was completely evacuated of Army personnel. Lt. Col. Stanley M. Persons, commanding officer of Geiger Field, was the commander of the now-inactive satellite base.

In 1939, the city agreed to lease the area to the military for one dollar a year, banning civilian use. The Works Progress Administration and the army jointly prepared the runways. In 1941, this airport was named Geiger Field in honor of Major Harold Geiger (1884–1927), U.S. Army aviator number six.

The Washington Air National Guard moved from Felts Field to Geiger when called to active duty during World War II. After the war, all passenger service was located at Geiger Field, which was renamed Spokane International Airport in 1960.

== Historic and Busy ==
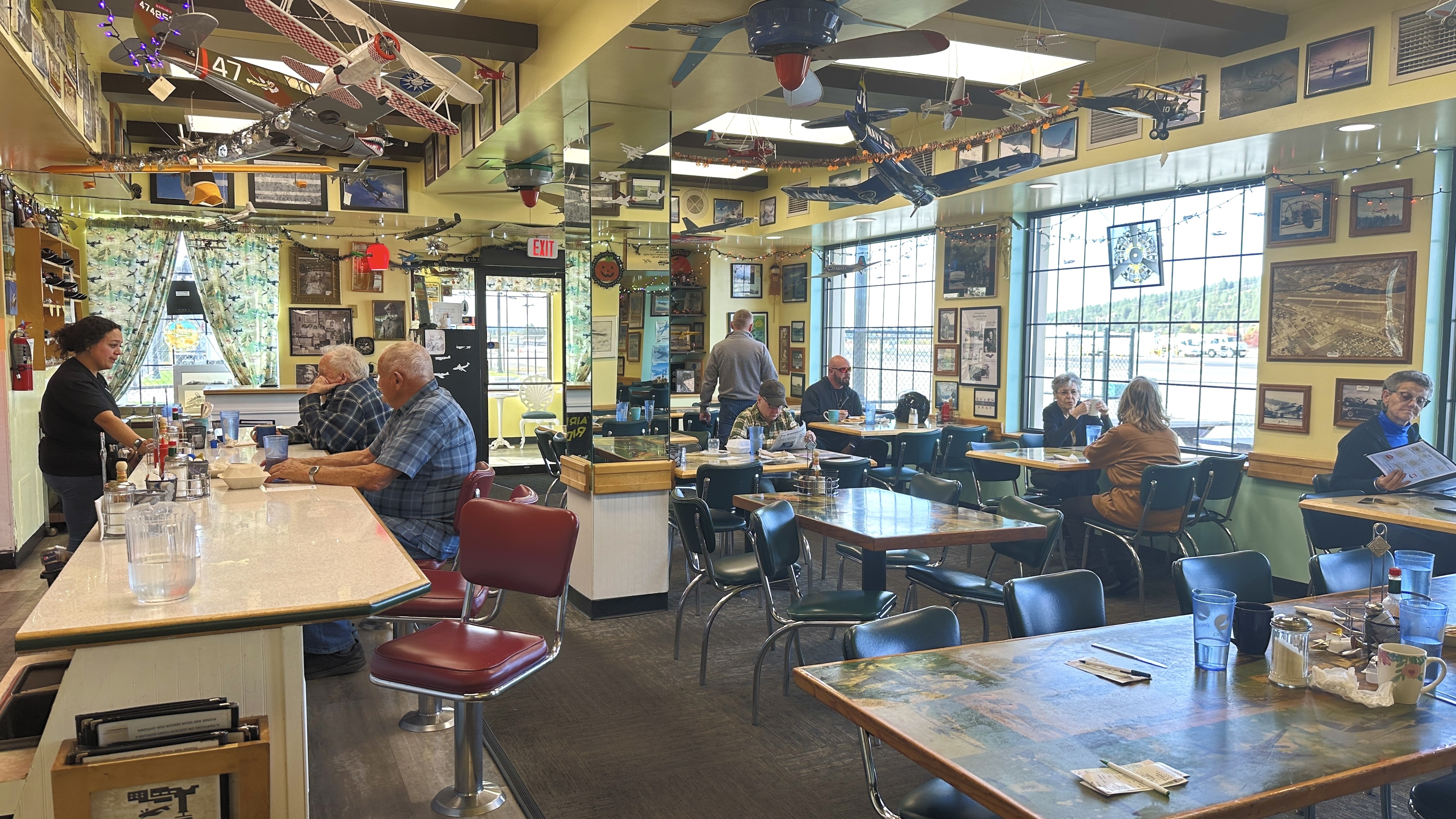
The Skyway Café

Felts Field has continued to serve as the airport for private and small planes of all kinds, even seaplanes, because of its location along a smooth stretch of the Spokane River. Felts Field is also a center for the restoration of vintage planes.

The airfield continues to provide charter services and flight instruction. A new control tower was added in 1968, and a Skyway Café, attached to the terminal building.
