= Abilene Trophy =

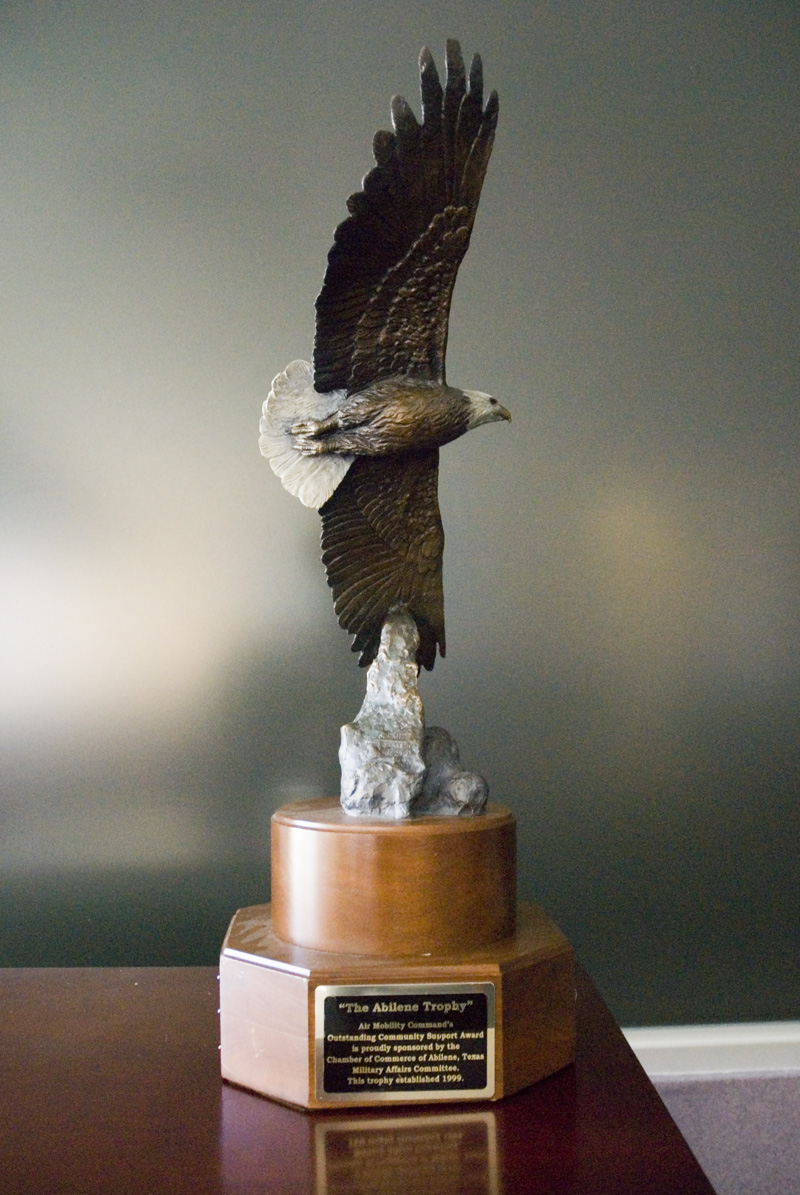
The Abilene Trophy

The Abilene Trophy is awarded annually to the community in Air Mobility Command that is most supportive of its local Air Force Base.

Formally known as the Air Mobility Command Community Support Award, it has been awarded since its establishment in 1998. The award's sponsor is the Abilene, Texas Chamber of Commerce. (Abilene is home to Dyess Air Force Base, which has an AMC contingent, the 317th Airlift Group; however, the host unit for Dyess AFB, the 7th Bomb Wing, is under the Air Force Global Strike Command, and thus Dyess AFB and its host community of Abilene would not be eligible for an award sponsored by its host city.)

Year	Community	Base Supported
1998	Grand Forks, North Dakota	Grand Forks Air Force Base
1999	Dover, Delaware	Dover Air Force Base
2000	Spokane, Washington	Fairchild Air Force Base
2001	Greater Tampa Bay Area, Florida	MacDill Air Force Base
2002	Charleston, South Carolina Metro Chamber and Area Communities	Charleston Air Force Base
2003	Greater Tampa Bay Area, Florida	MacDill Air Force Base
2004	Grand Forks, North Dakota	Grand Forks Air Force Base
2005	Charleston, South Carolina Metro Chamber and Area Communities	Charleston Air Force Base
2006	Spokane, Washington	Fairchild Air Force Base
2007	Charleston, South Carolina Metro Chamber and Area Communities	Charleston Air Force Base
2008	Dover, Delaware	Dover Air Force Base
2009	Little Rock, Arkansas	Little Rock Air Force Base
2010	Fayetteville, North Carolina	Pope Air Force Base
2011	Little Rock	Little Rock Air Force Base
2012	St. Louis, Missouri / Belleville, Illinois Region	Scott Air Force Base
2013	Spokane, Washington	Fairchild Air Force Base
2014	St. Louis, Missouri / Belleville, Illinois Region	Scott Air Force Base
2015	Dover, Delaware	Dover Air Force Base
2016	Wichita, Kansas / Wichita Metro Chamber and Area Communities	McConnell Air Force Base

== See also ==
- Air Mobility Command
