= Curt Teich and Company Building =

- U.S. National Register of Historic Places
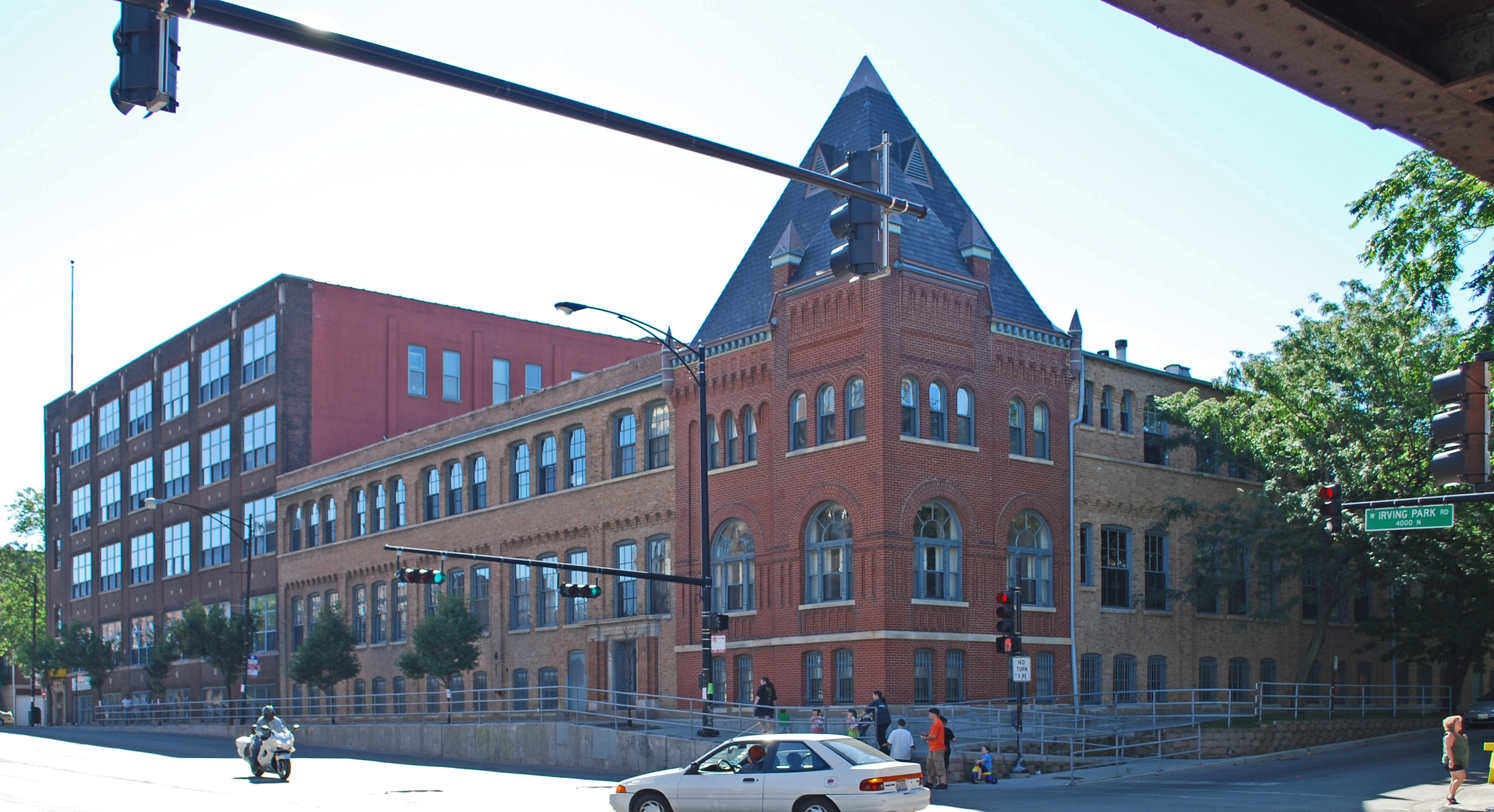

- Location within Chicago metropolitan area Location within Illinois Location within the United States
- Location: 1733-55 W. Irving Park Rd., Chicago, Illinois
- Coordinates: 41°57′14″N 87°40′25″W
- Area: less than one acre
- NRHP reference No.: 90000340
- Added to NRHP: March 7, 1990

The Curt Teich and Company Building is a historic building at 1733-55 W. Irving Park Road in the Lakeview neighborhood of Chicago, Illinois. The building was the headquarters and printing press of Curt Teich and Company, one of the first postcard companies and a major influence on the form's development. While the original building's construction date is unclear, the company moved to the building in 1910; a large addition was placed on the building in 1922. Teich traveled throughout the country, and eventually to other countries in North America, to take photographs for his postcards; his travels made postcards available from any sizable town, rather than just major tourist destinations, and produced a historical record of American towns in the process. The company was also responsible for several innovations in the printing and coloring process.

The building was added to the National Register of Historic Places on March 7, 1990.

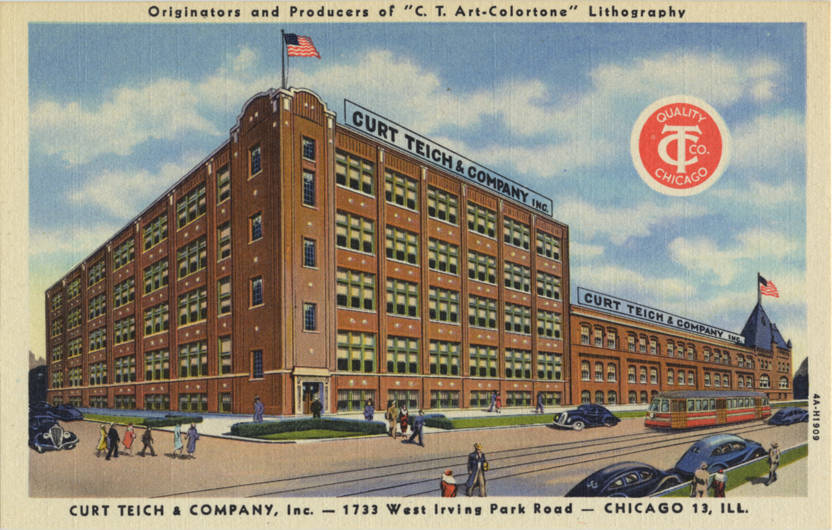
Curt Teich and Company postcard of their own headquarters
