= Einar Axel Malmstrom =

US Air Force officer (1907–1954)

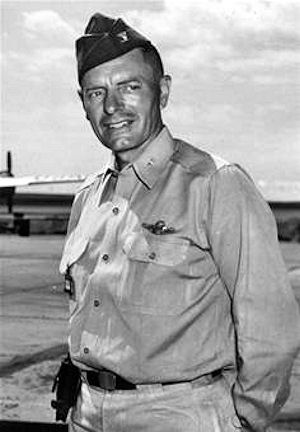
- Colonel Einar Axel Malmstrom
- Born: July 14, 1907; Chicago, Illinois, U.S.
- Died: August 21, 1954 (aged 47); Great Falls, Montana, U.S.
- Burial place: Arlington National Cemetery
- Military career
- Allegiance: United States
- Branch: United States Army Air Corps; United States Army Air Forces; United States Air Force
- Service years: 1929–1954
- Rank: Colonel
- Unit: 356th Fighter Group
- Commands: 356th Fighter Group
- Conflicts: World War II
- Awards: Bronze Star; Air Medal

Einar Axel Malmstrom (July 14, 1907 – August 21, 1954) was a colonel in the United States Air Force. Malmstrom was born in Chicago, Illinois to Swedish immigrants, Per O Malmström and Hanna Eklund Malmström from the area close to Kristianstad. He was a P-47 Thunderbolt fighter pilot and commanding officer of the 356th Fighter Group of the 8th Air Force during World War II. He was shot down in 1944 and was a prisoner of war in Stalag Luft I from April 1944 through May 1945.

== National Guard ==
Malmstrom enlisted as a private in the Washington National Guard's 116th Observation Squadron on May 12, 1929. He was commissioned a second lieutenant on May 25, 1931, and promoted to first lieutenant on 21 May 1936. He completed the Air Corps Tactical School's National Guard Officers' Armament Course in 1933 and obtained ratings as both a pilot and observer.

== World War II ==
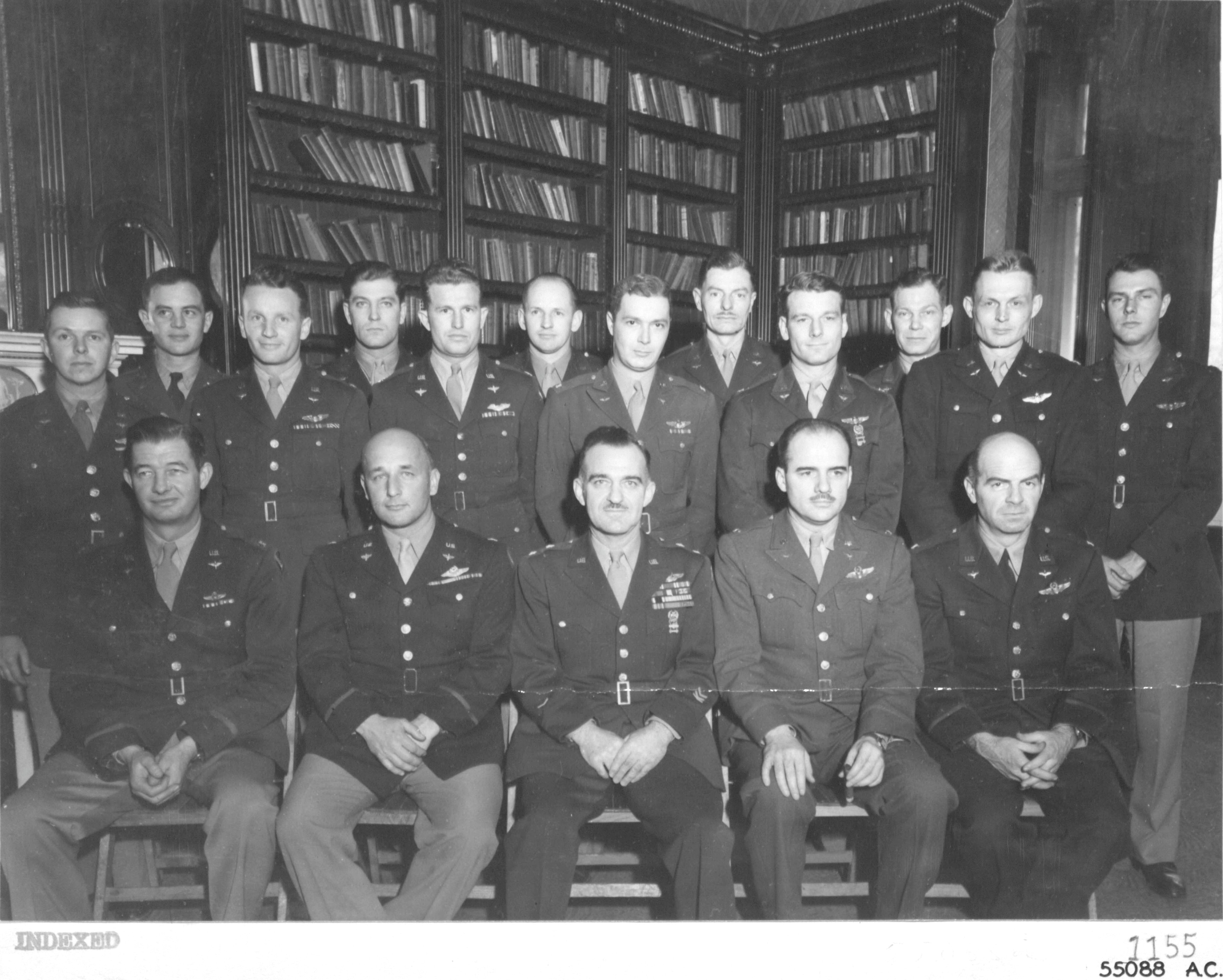
Commanding officers of the fighter groups of the 8th Air Force in 1944; Malmstrom is fifth from the right standing

Malmstrom was called to active service as a first lieutenant on September 16, 1940, at Parkwater, Washington. He was promoted to captain in the Army of the United States on 24 October 1941 and to major on 12 April 1942 under Public Law 455 prescribing regulations for wartime promotion of Air Corps officers, which was affirmed on 1 September 1942. He was sent to Europe in May 1943 and took command of the 356th Fighter Group at RAF Martlesham Heath. On April 24, 1944, he was shot down over France and taken prisoner by the German Army. He spent a year in captivity at Stalag Luft I, where he was named leader of the American prisoners in the south compound. For this, he was awarded a Bronze Star.

== Cold War ==
Malmstrom returned to the U.S. in May 1945 and was assigned as Air Inspector for the 312th Base Unit in Barksdale, Louisiana, the XIX Tactical Air Command at Biggs Field, Texas, and at Greenville, South Carolina. He was Deputy for Reserve Forces for the 9th Air Force until August 1949 when he entered the Air War College. He was then a senior Air Force instructor at the Army War College. He was Director of Personnel at Lockbourne Air Force Base. In February 1954 he was assigned to Great Falls Air Force Base in Montana, as Deputy Wing Commander of the 407th Strategic Fighter Wing.

== Death ==
Malmstrom was killed in a Lockheed T-33 fighter jet crash near Great Falls Air Force Base in Montana on August 21, 1954.

== Awards and honors ==

USAF Command Pilot
Bronze Star	Air Medal	Prisoner of War Medal
American Defense Service Medal	American Campaign Medal	European–African–Middle Eastern Campaign Medal with bronze campaign star
World War II Victory Medal	National Defense Service Medal	Air Force Longevity Service Award with bronze oak leaf cluster

=== Malmstrom Air Force Base ===
Great Falls Air Force Base was renamed Malmstrom Air Force Base in his honor in October 1955.
