= Leslie MacDill =

United States Army Air Corps officer (1889–1938)

Colonel Leslie MacDill
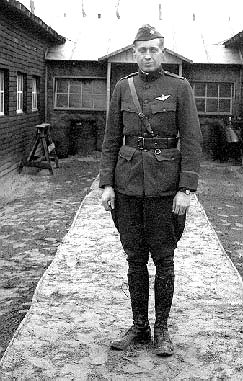
- Colonel Leslie MacDill
- Born: February 19, 1889; Monmouth, Illinois, U.S.
- Died: November 9, 1938 (aged 49); Bolling Field, Washington, D.C., U.S.
- Military career
- Allegiance: United States of America
- Branch: United States Army Air Service; United States Army Air Corps
- Service years: 1912-1938
- Rank: Colonel
- Conflicts: World War I

Colonel Leslie MacDill was a United States Army Air Corps officer. MacDill Air Force Base near Tampa, Florida is named in his honor. Colonel MacDill was one of aviation's early pioneers.

== Biography ==
=== Education ===
MacDill was born at Monmouth, Illinois, on 19 February 1889. He graduated from Hanover College in 1909 with an A.B. degree, and from Indiana University in 1911 with an A.M. degree. In 1920, he enrolled at the Massachusetts Institute of Technology where he earned a Doctor of Science in aeronautical engineering in 1922.

=== Military service ===
He was commissioned from civilian life as a second lieutenant, Coast Artillery Corps, on 13 April 1912. He served with the 6th Company, Coast Artillery Corps from 10 December 1912, until his detail in 1914 in the Aviation Section, Signal Corps. Upon completion of his flying training at the Signal Corps Aviation School at San Diego, California, he was rated a Junior Military Aviator on 2 July 1915, which automatically advanced him to the rank of first lieutenant.

He was promoted to captain on 15 May 1917. He commanded a training group assigned to Foggio, Italy in 1917. His second in command was future mayor of New York Fiorello LaGuardia. After World War I, he stayed in the force during peace time, dedicating himself to aviation development.

He advocated for the creation of the Air Corps, predecessor of the Air Force, leading to its creation in 1926. He continued to work for the expansion and funding of the Air Corps through the 1930s until his death. He was promoted to Major on 1 July 1920. He was promoted to lieutenant colonel on 1 August 1935 and to colonel on 26 August 1936.

=== Death ===
MacDill died as the result of an airplane crash on the morning of 9 November 1938, in Washington D.C. The accident occurred several minutes after his takeoff from Bolling Field in a BC-1 aircraft.

Accounts pieced together from eyewitnesses indicated that something went wrong with the motor. Colonel MacDill first tried to get back to Bolling Field, and then aimed his plane for a narrow space between two houses. The descending plane cut down telephone and power wires, knocked down a pole, clipped off tree limbs, plunged to the ground and burst into flames. MacDill and his mechanic, Private Joseph G. Gloxner, were killed instantly.
