= Opheim Air Force Station =

Closed United States Air Force General Surveillance Radar station

Opheim Air Force Station
- Part of Air Defense Command (ADC)
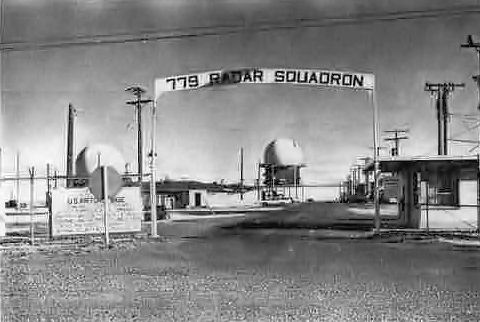
- Main Gate

Site information
- Type: Air Force Station
- Controlled by: United States Air Force

Location
- Location of Opheim AFS, Montana
- Coordinates: 48°51′40″N 106°28′40″W

Site history
- Built: 1951
- In use: 1951–1979

Garrison information
- Garrison: 779th Aircraft Control and Warning Squadron

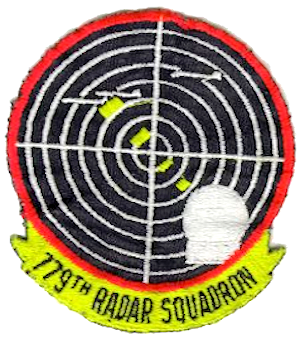
Emblem of the 779th Radar Squadron

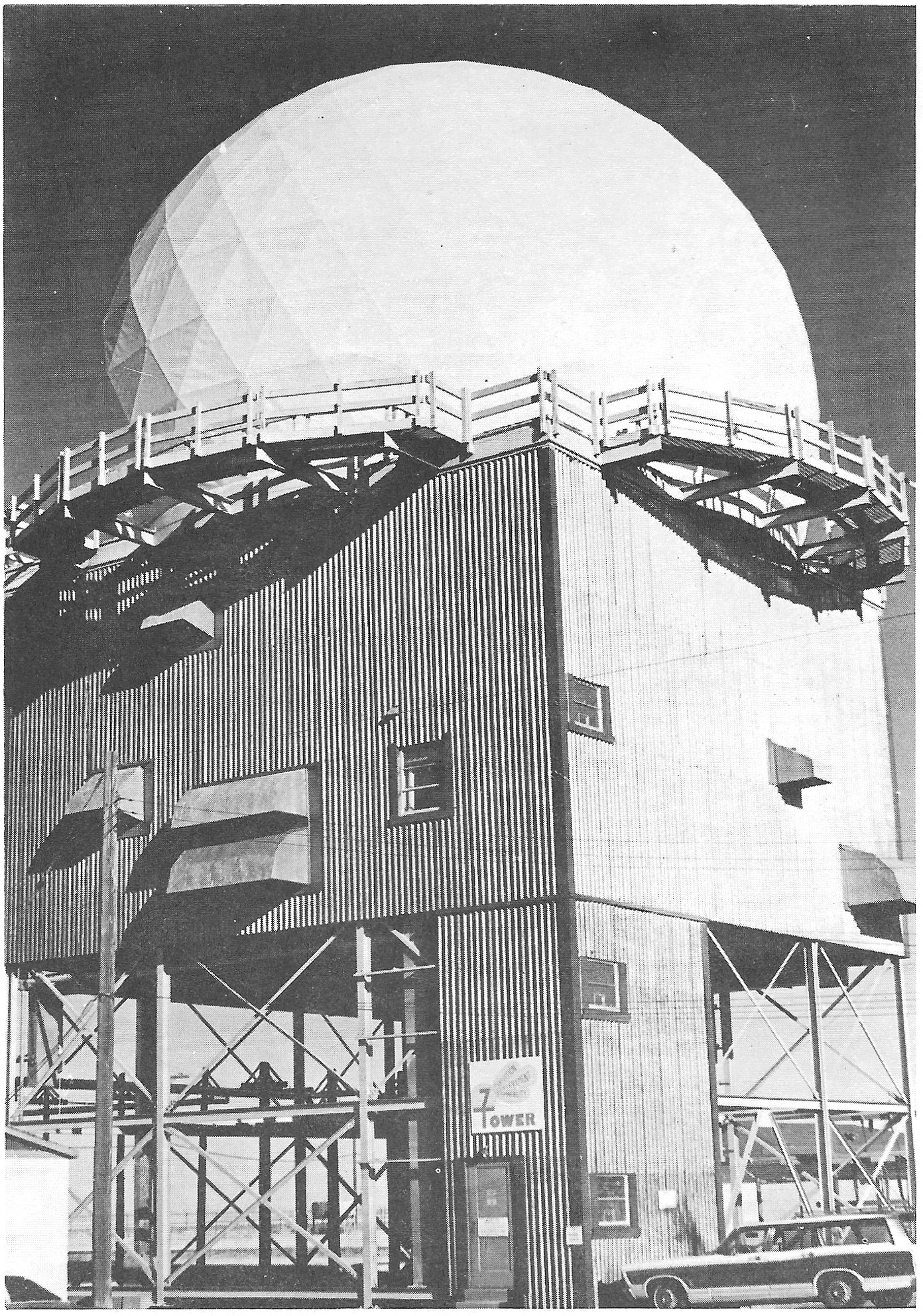
FPS-7 Radar Tower 1973 Opheim Air Force Station Montana

Opheim Air Force Station (ADC ID: P-26, NORAD ID: Z-26) is a closed United States Air Force General Surveillance Radar station. It is located 3.3 miles (5.3 km) west of Opheim, Montana. It was closed in 1979.

== History ==
In late 1951 Air Defense Command selected Opheim, Montana as one of twenty-eight radar stations built as part of the second segment of the permanent radar surveillance network. Prompted by the start of the Korean War, on 11 July 1950, the Secretary of the Air Force asked the Secretary of Defense for approval to expedite construction of the second segment of the permanent network. Receiving the Defense Secretary's approval on 21 July, the Air Force directed the Corps of Engineers to proceed with construction.

On 1 March 1951 the 779th Aircraft Control and Warning Squadron was activated at Opheim AFS with AN/FPS-3 and AN/FPS-4 radars, and initially the station functioned as a Ground-Control Intercept (GCI) and warning station. As a GCI station, the squadron's role was to guide interceptor aircraft toward unidentified intruders picked up on the unit's radar scopes. An AN/GPS-3 radar operated between 1957 and 1961. In 1958 and 1959 AN/FPS-6 and AN/FPS-6A radars replaced the AN/FPS-4 height-finder radar. The AN/FPS-3, operational until late 1961, was replaced by an AN/FPS-7C search radar. The FPS-3 along an FPS-8 were the primary search radars. The FPS-8 was used as a backup for the FPS-7C until mid to late 1962. The spare IFF unit from the FPS-8 was salvaged and used in the FPS-7C. Also, the MIT unit from the FPS-3 was salvaged and used in the FPS-7C since its MIT was not operational until after the spring of 1964 due to design problems. SAGE utilization required both the IFF and MIT to be operational.

During 1961 Opheim AFS joined the Semi Automatic Ground Environment (SAGE) system, initially feeding data to DC-20 at Malmstrom AFB, Montana. After joining, the squadron was re-designated as the 779th Radar Squadron (SAGE) on 15 July 1961. The radar squadron provided information 24/7 to the SAGE Direction Center where it was analyzed to determine range, direction, altitude, speed, and whether aircraft were friendly or hostile.

In 1963 the squadron operated the AN/FPS-7C search radar along with AN/FPS-26A and AN/FPS-90 height-finder radars. The FPS-26A heightfinder was not operational until after the spring of 1964. On 31 July 1963, the site was redesignated as NORAD ID Z-26. The AN/FPS-90 was damaged by a fire in 1966, but was repaired; it was removed sometime in the early 1970s.

In addition to the main facility, Opheim operated two AN/FPS-14 Gap Filler sites:

- Whitewater, MT (P-26A) 48°48′05″N 107°32′00″W
- Whitetail, MT (P-26D) 48°55′47″N 105°15′00″W

Over the years, the equipment at the station was upgraded or modified to improve the efficiency and accuracy of the information gathered by the radars. Opheim AFS ceased operations on 1 June 1979 as part of the inactivation of Aerospace Defense Command. The 779th Radar Squadron (SAGE) was inactivated on 29 September 1979.

Today, the former Opheim Air Force Station is abandoned and largely obliterated. Most of the Air Force buildings have been razed, their foundations remain. A few buildings still stand derelict.

== Air Force units and assignments ==
=== Units ===
- Constituted as the 779th Aircraft Control and Warning Squadron

Activated on 1 March 1951
Redesignated as 779th Radar Squadron (SAGE) on 15 July 1961
Redesignated as 779th Radar Squadron on 1 February 1974
Inactivated on 29 September 1979

=== Assignments ===
- 545th Aircraft Control and Warning Group, 1 March 1951
- 29th Air Division, 6 February 1952
- Minot Air Defense Sector (Manual), 1 January 1961
- Great Falls Air Defense Sector, 25 June 1963
- 28th Air Division, 1 April 1966
- 24th Air Division, 19 November 1969 – 29 September 1979

== See also ==
- List of United States Air Force aircraft control and warning squadrons
- United States general surveillance radar stations
