= Havre Air Force Station =

Surveillance radar station during the Cold War

Havre Air Force Station
- 26 miles (42 km) northwest of Havre, Montana

Site information
- Type: Air Force Station
- Controlled by: United States Air Force Air Defense Command

Location
- Location of Havre AFS, Montana
- Coordinates: 48°52′51″N 109°56′42″W

Site history
- Built: 1951
- In use: 1951–1979

Garrison information
- Garrison: 778th Air Defense Group, 778th Aircraft Control and Warning Squadron (later 778th Radar Squadron)

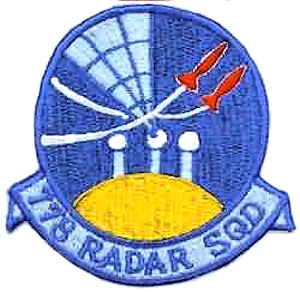
778th Radar Squadron emblem

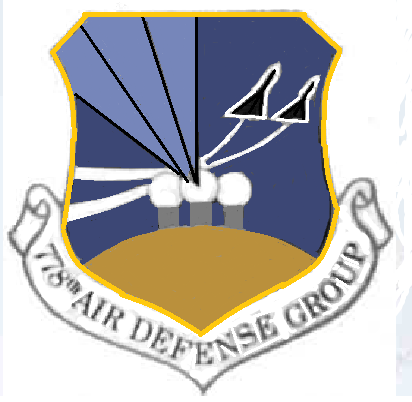
778th Air Defense Group emblem

Havre Air Force Station (site designator P-25, Z-25 after 31 July 1963) is a Formerly Used Defense Site that was used as a Cold War general surveillance radar station. In addition to radar facilities and a NORAD Control Center the site had support services: NCO club, bowling alley, hobby shops, library, movie theater, barber shop, exchange, commissary, grade school, and housing for officers and senior NCOs.

== History ==
In late 1951 Air Defense Command selected Simpson, Montana as a site for one of twenty-eight radar stations built as part of the second segment of the permanent radar surveillance network. Prompted by the start of the Korean War, on 11 July 1950, the Secretary of the Air Force asked the Secretary of Defense for approval to expedite construction of the second segment of the permanent network. Receiving the Defense Secretary's approval on 21 July, the Air Force directed the United States Army Corps of Engineers to proceed with construction.

On 1 March 1951 the 778th Aircraft Control and Warning Squadron was activated at Simpson and began operating AN/FPS-3 and AN/FPS-4 radars. Initially, the station functioned as a ground control intercept (GCI) and warning station. As a GCI station, the squadron's role was to guide interceptor aircraft toward unidentified intruders picked up on the unit's radar scopes.

=== Havre Air Force Station ===
The site was renamed Havre Air Force Station on 1 December 1953. The Air Force added an AN/GPS-3 radar c. late 1958 that stayed until 1965.

During 1961 Havre AFS joined the Semi Automatic Ground Environment (SAGE) system, when a Burroughs AN/FST-2 Coordinate Data Transmitting Set was installed to transfer radar track data to Air Defense Direction Center DC-20 at Malmstrom Air Force Base, Montana. After joining SAGE, the squadron was redesignated as the 778th Radar Squadron (SAGE) on 1 March 1961. The radar squadron provided information 24/7 the SAGE Direction Center where it was analyzed to determine range, direction altitude speed and whether or not aircraft were friendly or hostile. On 31 July 1963, the site was redesignated as NORAD ID Z-25.

In the early 1960s AN/FPS-6 and AN/FPS-6B radars took over height-finder duties. The AN/FPS-6B was upgraded to an AN/FPS-90 in 1964; it was deactivated in 1969. In 1965 an AN/FPS-27 replaced the AN/GPS-3 as the search radar.

In addition to the main facility, Havre operated two AN/FPS-18 Gap Filler sites:

- Galata, Montana (P-25A) 48°46′15″N 111°19′44″W
- Hogeland, Montana (P-25B) 48°51′29″N 108°34′12″W

=== Backup Interceptor Control ===
Over the years, the equipment at the station was upgraded or modified to improve the efficiency and accuracy of the information gathered by the radars. The 778th Radar Sq was inactivated and replaced by the 778th Air Defense Group in March 1970. The upgrade to group status was done because of Havre AFS' status as a Backup Interceptor Control (BUIC) site. BUIC sites were alternate control sites in the event that SAGE Direction Centers became disabled and unable to control interceptor aircraft. The group was inactivated and replaced by the 778th Radar Squadron as defenses against crewed bombers were reduced. Havre AFS was assigned to Malmstrom Air Force Base on 17 June 1974.

Prior to the December 1979 breakup of Aerospace Defense Command, the Department of Defense announced the proposed closure of "40 obsolete air defense radar stations", 95 military and 25 civilian positions were lost and Havre AFS closed on 1 July 1979. The 778th Radar Squadron did not inactivate until September.

=== Anchor Academy ===
The Anchor Academy, a school for troubled teenage boys, operated at the station in 2001, and a few homes in the former military housing area are private residences.

== Air Force units and assignments ==
=== Units ===
Squadron

- Constituted as the 778th Aircraft Control and Warning Squadron

Activated 1 March 1951 at Simpson, Montana
Redesignated 778th Radar Squadron (SAGE) on 1 March 1961
Inactivated on 1 March 1970
Redesignated 778th Radar Squadron on 1 January 1974
Activated on 17 January 1974
Inactivated on 29 September 1979

Group

- Constituted as the 778th Air Defense Group on 13 February 1970

Activated on 1 March 1970
Inactivated on 17 January 1974
Disbanded on 21 September 1984

=== Assignments ===
545th Aircraft Control and Warning Group, 1 March 1951
29th Air Division, 6 February 1952
Great Falls Air Defense Sector, 1 July 1960
28th Air Division, 1 April 1966
24th Air Division, 19 November 1969 – 29 September 1979

=== Commanders ===
- 778th Radar Squadron

Maj. Lowell D. Covington, unknown – 1 Mar 1970

- 778th Air Defense Group

Maj. Lowell D. Covington, 1 Mar 1970 – unknown

== See also ==
- List of United States Air Force aircraft control and warning squadrons
- United States general surveillance radar stations
