= Fortuna Air Force Station =

North Dakota, an abandoned Air Force Long Range radar site

Fortuna Air Force Station
- Part of Air Defense Command (ADC)
- Elkhorn Township, Divide County, west of Fortuna, North Dakota
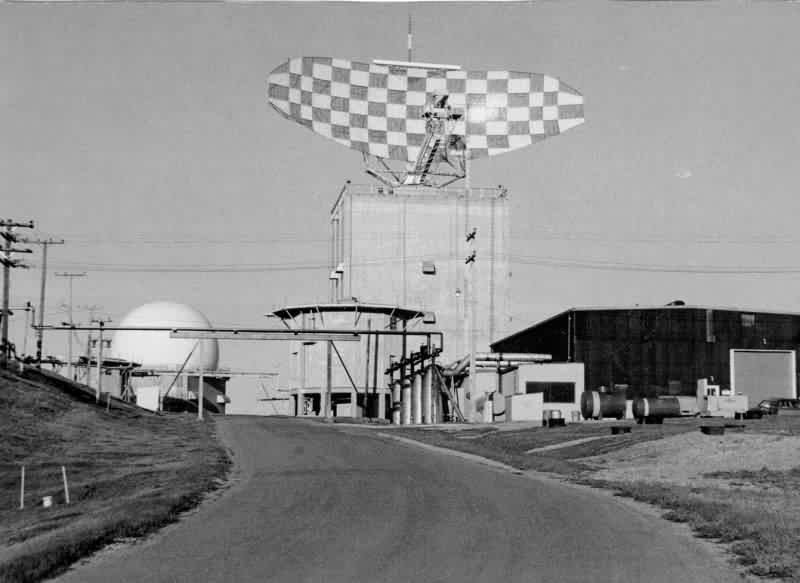
- Circa 1977 historical photograph

Site information
- Type: Air Force station
- Code: ADC ID: P-27 NORAD ID: Z-27
- Owner: sold to civilians, subsequently forfeited to county auditors
- Controlled by: United States Air Force

Location
- Location of Fortuna AFS, North Dakota
- Coordinates: 48°54′14″N 103°52′00″W

Site history
- In use: April 1952–July 1979 (main site), April 1952–1984 (GATR)

Garrison information
- Garrison: 780th Air Defense Group, 780th Aircraft Control & Warning Squadron (later 780th Radar Squadron)

Fortuna Air Force Station is a closed United States Air Force General Surveillance Radar station. It is located 4.2 miles (6.8 km) west of Fortuna, North Dakota. It was closed in 1979 as a radar station, remaining as a Long-Range Radar (LRR) facility until 1984.

Fortuna Air Force Station was part of the last batch of twenty-three radar stations constructed as part of the Air Defense Command permanent network. It was activated in April, and declared completely operational in late 1952.

== History ==
The 780th Aircraft Control and Warning Squadron (AC&W Sq) began operations using AN/FPS-3 search and AN/FPS-4 height-finder radars, and initially the station functioned as a Ground-control intercept (GCI) and warning station. As a GCI station, the squadron's role was to guide interceptor aircraft toward unidentified intruders picked up on the unit's radar scopes. During 1957 an AN/GPS-3 search radar made a brief appearance. Reportedly, an AN/TPS-10D was also briefly used. In 1958 the 780th began operating an AN/FPS-20A search radar that replaced the AN/GPS-3. By 1960 a pair of AN/FPS-6, -6A handled height-finder chores.

During 1961 Fortuna AFS joined the Semi Automatic Ground Environment (SAGE) system, initially feeding data to DC-20 at Malmstrom Air Force Base, Montana. After joining, the squadron was redesignated as the 780th Radar Squadron (SAGE) on 1 August 1961. The radar squadron provided information 24/7 to the SAGE Direction Center where it was analyzed to determine range, direction, altitude, speed and whether or not the aircraft were friendly or hostile. Fortuna was incorporated into BUIC I, a manual back-up interceptor control system implemented in 1962. BUIC I provided limited command and control capability in the event the SAGE system was disabled.

In 1963, the AN/FPS-20A was removed, and the makeup of the radars at Fortuna consisted of an AN/FPS-35 search radar along with AN/FPS-6 and AN/FPS-90 height-finder radars. On 31 July 1963, the site was redesignated as NORAD ID Z-27. The FPS-35 tower was located 6.6 miles from the U.S./Canada border and 8.3 miles from the North Dakota/Montana border.

In 1964 an AN/FPS-26A height-finder radar was installed, and the AN/FPS-6 was retired. In the winter of 1964, a fierce wind storm blew over the AN/FPS-35 sail; the sail was not replaced until the following year (by the one formerly installed at Manassas Air Force Station, Virginia, reportedly). For the interim, in 1965 an AN/FPS-64 search radar was installed in the former AN/FPS-20A tower; it was removed in 1967 after the AN/FPS-35 was again fully operational. The AN/FPS-90 height-finder radar was removed in 1969. Work proceeded on the installation of BUIC II in 1966, after the installation of a Burroughs CSA-51 computer system, In 1969 it became a BUIC III site.

Over the years, the equipment at the station was upgraded or modified to improve the efficiency and accuracy of the information gathered by the radars. The 780th Radar Sq was inactivated and replaced by the 780th Air Defense Group in March 1970. The upgrade to group status was done because of Fortuna AFS' status as a Backup Interceptor Control (BUIC) site. BUIC sites were alternate control sites in the event that SAGE Direction Centers became disabled and unable to control interceptor aircraft. The group was inactivated and replaced by the 780th Radar Squadron as defenses against crewed bombers were reduced. The group was disbanded in 1984. Normal operations continued until 1979 when Aerospace Defense Command was inactivated in September and the radar station was inactivated. The GATR site (R-27) was retained until the Joint Surveillance System (JSS) switchover, c. 1984. The Federal Aviation Administration (FAA) opened an unstaffed ARSR-4 radar facility about halfway between Sidney, Montana, and Watford City, North Dakota before the Fortuna radars were finally decommissioned in 1984.

== Current use ==
The station was bought by private investors that stripped the site of anything of value and sold it off. After this "salvage", the site was forfeited to Divide County over a valuation dispute, and now sits half-demolished, useless as a facility, and abandoned. An environmental impact study is currently planned as a precursor to a possible land reclamation effort.

The main tower is now housing a operating cell tower.

Historical signage was erected by the county, with a turn off on Highway 5. All buildings but the main radar building have been removed.

== Buildings and facilities ==
Buildings on the station include:

Recreational Services
Gymnasium, tennis courts, 2-lane bowling alley, horseshoe pits, baseball field, movie theater
Motor Pool
Headquarters Building
Library
Dining Hall
Medical Aid Station

Base Housing
45 houses
3 dormitories
NCO dorm
6 BOQ (Bachelor Officer Quarters) units
trailer court (30 units, reduced to 20 in 1974)
Officer's Lounge ("Hilltop Inn")
NCO Open Mess

Radar Towers (FPS-35, FPS-26 w/radome, one inactive)
Power Plant
Dental Clinic
Base Exchange
Auto Hobby Shop
Base Theater/Post Office

The Ground to Air Transmitter-Receiver (GATR) facility was located off-station at 48°53′05″N 103°53′03″W, roughly one mile south of the main station.

== Air Force units and assignments ==
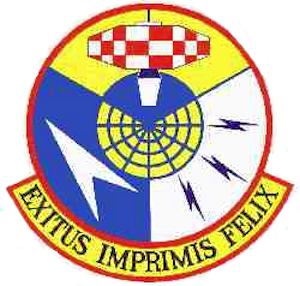
780th Radar Squadron emblem

=== Units ===
- Constituted as the 780th Aircraft Control and Warning Squadron

Activated on 1 March 1951
Redesignated 780th Radar Squadron (SAGE) on 1 August 1961
Inactivated 1 March 1970
Redesignated 780th Radar Squadron, 1 January 1974
Activated 17 January 1974
Inactivated 29 September 1979

- Constituted as the 780th Air Defense Group on 13 February 1970

Activated on 1 March 1970
Inactivated on 17 January 1974
Disbanded on 27 September 1984

=== Assignments ===
- 545th Aircraft Control and Warning Group, 1 March 1951
- 29th Air Division, 6 February 1952
- Minot Air Defense Sector (Manual), 1 January 1961
- Great Falls Air Defense Sector, 25 June 1963
- 28th Air Division, 1 April 1966
- 24th Air Division, 19 November 1969 - 29 September 1979

=== Commanders ===
- Major Phillip J. Acton
- Lt. Col. Glen A. Peebles
- Major Leland J. Cupples
- Major Harold E. Daniel
- Major Larry McDonnough
- Major Curtis Yarwood
- 780th Radar Squadron

Major Jack L. Breid, unknown - 1 March 1970

- 780th Air Defense Group

Major Jack L. Breid, 1 March 1970 - unknown

== See also ==
- List of USAF Aerospace Defense Command General Surveillance Radar Stations
- List of United States Air Force aircraft control and warning squadrons
