= Lewistown Air Force Station =

Closed United States Air Force General Surveillance Radar station

Lewistown Air Force Station
- Part of Air Defense Command (ADC)

Site information
- Type: Air Force Station
- Controlled by: United States Air Force

Location
- Location of Lewistown AFS, Montana
- Coordinates: 47°13′03″N 109°13′19″W

Site history
- Built: 1958
- In use: 1958-1971

Garrison information
- Garrison: 694 Aircraft Control and Warning Squadron

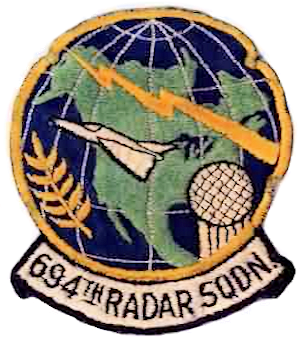
Emblem of the 694th Radar Squadron

Lewistown Air Force Station (ADC ID: TM-178 NORAD ID: Z-178) is a closed United States Air Force General Surveillance Radar station. It is located 7.0 miles (11.3 km) east-southeast of Hilger, Montana. It was closed in 1971.

== History ==
Lewistown Air Force Station came into existence as part of Phase III of the Air Defense Command Mobile Radar program. On 20 October 1953 ADC requested a third phase of twenty-five radar sites be constructed.

The 694th Aircraft Control and Warning Squadron was assigned to Lewistown AFS on 1 September 1958. The squadron began manual radar operations in February 1960 with AN/FPS-3A and AN/FPS-6 radars, and initially the station functioned as a Ground-Control Intercept (GCI) and warning station. As a GCI station, the squadron's role was to guide interceptor aircraft toward unidentified intruders picked up on the unit's radar scopes.

An AN/FPS-90 height-finder radar was added a year later. During 1961 Lewistown AFS joined the Semi Automatic Ground Environment (SAGE) system, initially feeding data to DC-20 at Malmstrom AFB, Montana. After joining, the squadron was re-designated as the 694th Radar Squadron (SAGE) on 1 March 1961. The radar squadron provided information 24/7 the SAGE Direction Center where it was analyzed to determine range, direction altitude speed and whether or not aircraft were friendly or hostile.

On 31 July 1963, the site was redesignated as NORAD ID Z-25, and the AN/FPS-3A was removed in 1963, replaced by an AN/FPS-66 search set. This radar was upgraded to an AN/FPS-66A in 1966. The AN/FPS-90 was removed from service in 1968.

The Air Force inactivated the 694th Radar Squadron on 30 June 1971 due to budget reductions. After the facility's closure, the housing/cantonment area was used for a time as the campus of the now-defunct Big Sky Bible College. The Air Force equipment atop Judith Mountain has been removed.

== Air Force units and assignments ==
=== Units ===
- Established as the 694th Aircraft Control and Warning Squadron

Activated at Malmstrom AFB, Montana on 8 August 1958
Moved to Lewistown AFS on 1 September 1958
Redesignated 694th Radar Squadron (SAGE) on 1 March 1961
Inactivated on 30 June 1971

=== Assignments ===
- 29th Air Division, 1 September 1958
- Great Falls Air Defense Sector, 1 July 1960
- 28th Air Division, 1 April 1966
- 24th Air Division, 19 November 1969 – 30 June 1971

Big Sky Bible college has reopened and is now located in Bozeman Montana

== See also ==
- List of USAF Aerospace Defense Command General Surveillance Radar Stations
