= Kalispell Air Force Station =

Kalispell Air Force Station
- Part of Air Defense Command (ADC)

Site information
- Type: Air Force Station
- Controlled by: United States Air Force

Location
- Location of Kalispell AFS, Montana
- Coordinates: 48°00′41″N 114°21′53″W

Site history
- Built: 1959
- In use: 1959-1978

Garrison information
- Garrison: 716th Aircraft Control and Warning Squadron

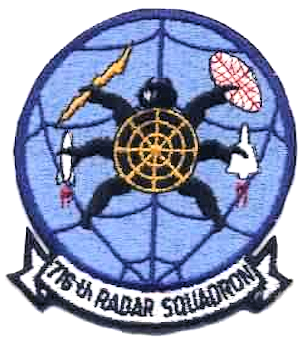
Emblem of the 716th Radar Squadron

Kalispell Air Force Station (ADC ID: TM-179, NORAD ID: Z-179) is a closed United States Air Force General Surveillance Radar station. It is located 13.3 miles (21.4 km) south of Kalispell, Montana near the community of Lakeside.

It was closed in 1978 by the Air Force, and the radar site on Blacktail Mountain was turned over to the Federal Aviation Administration (FAA). Today the radar site is part of the Joint Surveillance System (JSS), designated by NORAD as Western Air Defense Sector (WADS) Ground Equipment Facility J-78. The former garrison site at 501 Blacktail Road in Lakeside was acquired by Youth With A Mission in 1985, with the remaining eight houses previously retained by the Air Force for local military recruiters acquired by YWAM via GSA auction in 1992.

== History ==
Kalispell Air Force Station came into existence as part of Phase III of the Air Defense Command Mobile Radar program. On 20 October 1953 ADC requested a third phase of twenty-five radar sites be constructed.

The 716th Aircraft Control and Warning Squadron was assigned to the new station on 1 May 1959. The squadron started operations with an AN/FPS-7B search radar and a pair of AN/FPS-90 height-finder radars in 1961, and initially the station functioned as a Ground-Control Intercept (GCI) and warning station. As a GCI station, the squadron's role was to guide interceptor aircraft toward unidentified intruders picked up on the unit's radar scopes.

During 1960 Kalispell AFS joined the Semi Automatic Ground Environment (SAGE) system, initially feeding data to DC-20 at Malmstrom AFB, Montana. After joining, the squadron was re-designated as the 716th Radar Squadron (SAGE) on 15 October 1960. The radar squadron provided information 24/7 the SAGE Direction Center where it was analyzed to determine range, direction altitude speed and whether or not aircraft were friendly or hostile. On 31 July 1963, the site was redesignated as NORAD ID Z-179.

An AN/FPS-26 FD height-finder radar was to have replaced one of the height-finder radars, but was never installed. One AN/FPS-90 was decommissioned in 1969.

In addition to the main facility, Kalispell operated several AN/FPS-14 Gap Filler sites:

- Yaak AFS, MT (TM-179B/SM-151E) 48°51′42″N 115°43′21″W
- Eureka, MT (TM-179C/P-11B/SM-151F) 48°51′53″N 115°07′32″W

Over the years, the equipment at the station was upgraded or modified to improve the efficiency and accuracy of the information gathered by the radars. The 716th Radar Squadron (SAGE) was inactivated on 1 April 1978 as part of the draw down of Aerospace Defense Command, and the station turned over to the FAA, becoming a JSS site.

Circa 1977 the AN/FPS-90 was modified to an AN/FPS-116. In the early 1980s the AN/FPS-7B was replaced by an ARSR-3 search radar. The AN/FPS-116 was removed c. 1988. In the late 1990s, an ARSR-4 replaced the ARSR-3. The site remains in use as a JSS site today

== Air Force units and assignments ==
=== Units ===
- 716th Aircraft Control and Warning Squadron

Activated at Geiger Field, Washington on 1 October 1958
Moved to Kalispell AFS on 1 May 1959
Redesignated as 716th Radar Squadron (SAGE) on 15 October 1960
Redesignated as 716th Radar Squadron on 1 February 1974
Inactivated on 1 April 1978

=== Assignments ===
- 4700th Air Defense Wing, 1 May 1958
- 29th Air Division, 15 February 1960
- Great Falls Air Defense Sector, 1 July 1960
- 28th Air Division, 1 April 1966
- 25th Air Division, 19 November 1969 – 1 April 1978

== See also ==
- List of USAF Aerospace Defense Command General Surveillance Radar Stations
