= Cut Bank Air Force Station =

US Air Force radar station

Cut Bank Air Force Station
- Part of Air Defense Command (ADC)

Site information
- Type: Air Force Station
- Controlled by: United States Air Force

Location
- Location of Cut Bank AFS, Montana
- Coordinates: 48°56′32″N 112°48′21″W

Site history
- Built: 1952
- In use: 1952-1965

Garrison information
- Garrison: 681st Aircraft Control and Warning Squadron

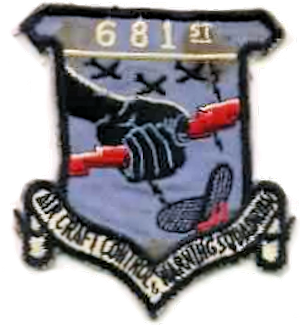
Emblem of the 681st Radar Squadron

Cut Bank Air Force Station (Perm ID: P-24, SAGE ID: Z-24) is a closed United States Air Force General Surveillance Radar station. It is located 30.4 miles (48.9 km) northwest of Cut Bank, Montana. It was closed in 1965.

== History ==
The facility was hosted by the 681st Aircraft Control and Warning (AC&W) Squadron, Air Defense Command between April 1952 and June 1965. Cut Bank AFS replaced an earlier radar site at Del Bonita, Montana (LP-24) which had opened in March 1951.

The 681st AC&W Squadron started operating AN/FPS-3 and AN/FPS-4 radars in April 1952, and initially the station functioned as a Ground-Control Intercept (GCI) and warning station. As a GCI station, the squadron's role was to guide interceptor aircraft toward unidentified intruders picked up on the unit's radar scopes. In 1958 an AN/FPS-20 search radar replaced the AN/FPS-3 at this site. In the following year two AN/FPS-6B height-finder radars superseded the AN/FPS-4.

In 1961 this site was integrated into the SAGE system, the squadron being re-designated as the 681st Radar Squadron (SAGE). The radar squadron provided information 24/7 the SAGE Direction Center where it was analyzed to determine range, direction altitude speed and whether or not aircraft were friendly or hostile. In 1962 the AN/FPS-20A was further upgraded and redesignated as an AN/FPS-66. In 1963 one AN/FPS-6B was removed and on 31 July, the site was redesignated as NORAD ID Z-24. In 1964 the other AN/FPS-6B was upgraded to an AN/FPS-90, and an AN/FPS-26A height-finder radar was installed.

In addition to the main facility, Cut Bank operated an AN/FPS-14 Gap Filler site:

- Browning, MT (P-24A) 48°52′14″N 113°10′22″W
- Sweetgrass, MT (P-24C) 48°58′49″N 111°57′43″W

The station was closed on 1 March 1965 as part of a general reduction of ADC. Today it is largely intact, and abandoned.

== Air Force units and assignments ==
=== Units ===
- Established as 681st Aircraft Control and Warning Squadron

Activated 1 March 1951 at Del Bonita (renamed Cut Bank Air Force Station, Montana on 1 December 1953)
Redesignated as 681st Radar Squadron (SAGE) on 1 March 1961
Discontinued and inactivated on 25 June 1965

Assignments:

- 545th Aircraft Control and Warning Group, 1 March 1951
- 29th Air Division, 6 February 1952
- Great Falls Air Defense Sector, 1 July 1960 – 25 June 1965

== See also ==
- List of USAF Aerospace Defense Command General Surveillance Radar Stations
