= Gettysburg Air Force Station =

Radar station in South Dakota, US 1956–1965

Gettysburg Air Force Station
- Part of Air Defense Command (ADC)

Site information
- Type: Air Force Station
- Code: ADC ID: P-29, NORAD ID: Z-29
- Controlled by: United States Air Force

Location
- Location of Gettysburg AFS, South Dakota
- Coordinates: 45°02′59″N 99°57′22″W

Site history
- Built: 1956
- In use: 1956–1965

Garrison information
- Garrison: 903d Aircraft Control and Warning Squadron

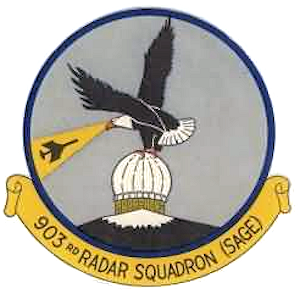
Emblem of the 903d Radar Squadron

Gettysburg Air Force Station is a closed United States Air Force General Surveillance Radar station. It is located 2.6 miles (4.2 km) north of Gettysburg, South Dakota. It was closed in 1968.

== History ==
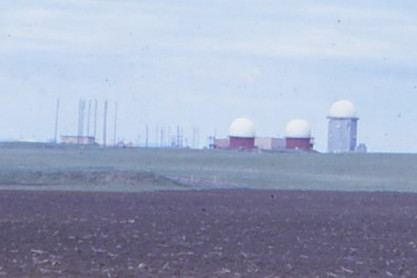
1964 photo of Gettysburg Air Force Station showing its radomes

In late 1951 Air Defense Command selected Gettysburg, South Dakota as one of twenty-eight radar stations built as part of the second segment of the permanent radar surveillance network. Prompted by the start of the Korean War, on 11 July 1950, the Secretary of the Air Force asked the Secretary of Defense for approval to expedite construction of the second segment of the permanent network. Receiving the Defense Secretary's approval on 21 July, the Air Force directed the Corps of Engineers to proceed with construction.

Gettysburg Air Force Station was activated on 1 January 1956 with the assignment of the 903d Aircraft Control and Warning Squadron. The station was initially equipped with an AN/MPS-7 search radar and an AN/MPS-14 height-finder radar, and initially the station functioned as a Ground-Control Intercept (GCI) and warning station. As a GCI station, the squadron's role was to guide interceptor aircraft toward unidentified intruders picked up on the unit's radar scopes. In 1958 an AN/FPS-20A search radar replaced the AN/MPS-7, and an AN/FPS-6A height-finder radar was installed.

During 1960 Gettysburg AFS joined the Semi Automatic Ground Environment (SAGE) system, initially feeding data to DC-11 at Grand Forks AFB, North Dakota. After joining, the squadron was re-designated as the 903d Radar Squadron (SAGE) on 15 January 1960. The radar squadron provided information 24/7 the SAGE Direction Center where it was analyzed to determine range, direction altitude speed and whether or not aircraft were friendly or hostile

The search radar subsequently was upgraded and redesignated as an AN/FPS-66 in 1961. In 1963 an AN/FPS-90 joined the AN/MPS-14 in performing height-finder duties. The station was re-designated as NORAD ID Z-29 on 31 July. In 1964 an AN/FPS-27 was installed, and the AN/FPS-66 was retired.

The Air Force inactivated the 903rd Radar Squadron on 18 June 1968. The FAA continues to operate long-range radar there today using an AN/FPS-67B search radar atop the old AN/FPS-27 radar tower as part of the Joint Surveillance System (JSS).

== Air Force units and assignments ==
=== Units ===
- Established as the 903d Aircraft Control and Warning Squadron

Activated at Great Falls AFB (later Malmstrom AFB), MT on 20 May 1953 (not manned or equipped)
Moved to Gettysburg AFS on 1 January 1956
Redesignated 903d Radar Squadron (SAGE) on 15 January 1960
Discontinued and inactivated on 18 June 1968

=== Assignments ===
- 29th Air Division, 1 January 1956
- 31st Air Division, 1 March 1956
- 29th Air Division, 1 January 1959
- Grand Forks Air Defense Sector, 1 April 1959
- Sioux City Air Defense Sector, 4 September 1963
- 30th Air Division, 1 April 1966 – 18 June 1968

== See also ==
- United States general surveillance radar stations
- List of United States Air Force aircraft control and warning squadrons
