= 29th Air Division =

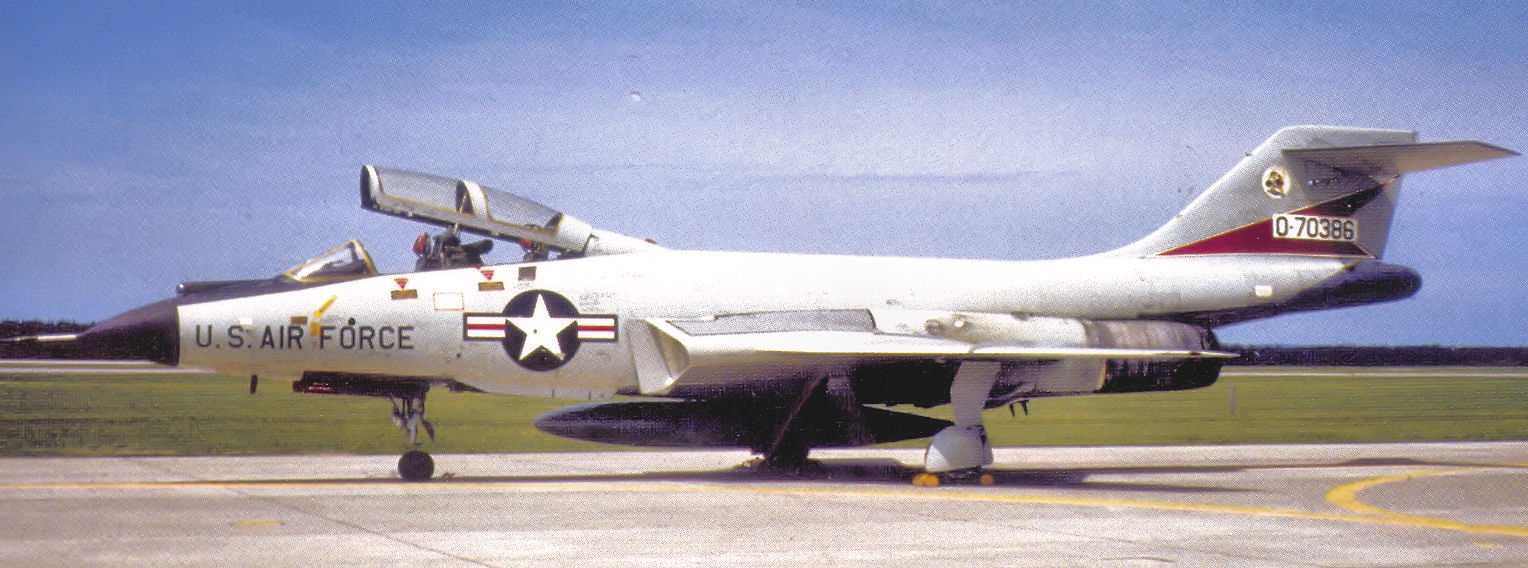
- 62d Fighter-Interceptor Squadron F-101B Voodoo (Note: Aircraft is McDonnell F-101B-96-MC, serial 57-0386. Dirkx, Marco (11 June 2025). "1957 USAF Serial Numbers". Joe Baugher’s Serial Number List.)
- Active: 1951–1969
- Country: United States
- Branch: United States Air Force
- Role: Command of air defense forces

Insignia
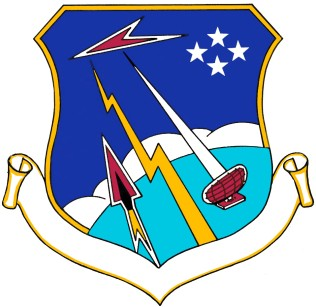
- 29th Air Division emblem (Note: Approved 27 November 1961.)

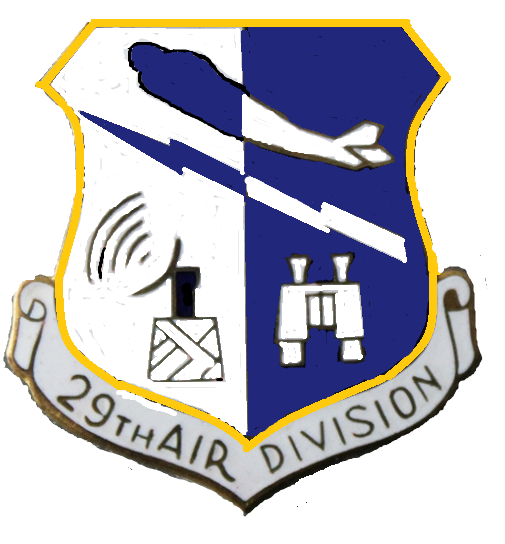
- Earlier 29th Air Division emblem

The 29th Air Division is an inactive United States Air Force organization. Its last assignment was with Air Defense Command at Duluth International Airport, Minnesota. It was inactivated on 15 November 1969.

== History ==
Assigned to Air Defense Command (ADC) for most of its existence, the division's mission was the air defense of Montana, Idaho, Wyoming, and parts of Nevada, Utah, and Colorado. By 1953, the area changed to include North Dakota, South Dakota, and Nebraska. The 29th supervised the training of its units, and participated in numerous training exercises.

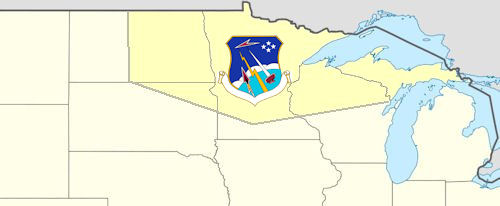
29th Air Division ADC AOR 1966–1969

The division moved from Richards-Gebaur Air Force Base, Missouri, to Duluth International Airport, Minnesota, on 1 April 1966 as part of an ADC reorganization, the division's area changed to include Minnesota, parts of Wisconsin, and North Dakota, and later expanded to cover most of Iowa. Assumed additional designation of 29th NORAD Region after activation of the NORAD Combat Operations Center at the Cheyenne Mountain Complex, Colorado and reporting was transferred to NORAD from ADC at Ent Air Force Base in April 1966 as the 29th NORAD Region/Air Division on 1 April 1966, replacing the Duluth Air Defense Sector.

Inactivated in November 1969 as ADC phased down its interceptor mission as the chances of a Soviet bomber attack on the United States seemed remote, its mission being consolidated into North American Aerospace Defense Command (NORAD)'s, 23d and 24th NORAD Regions/Air Divisions.

== Lineage ==
- Established as the 29 Air Division (Defense) on 29 January 1951

Activated on 1 March 1951
Inactivated on 1 February 1952

- Organized on 1 February 1952

Redesignated 29 Air Division (SAGE) on 1 January 1960
Inactivated on 19 November 1969

=== Assignments ===
- Western Air Defense Force, 1 March 1951
- Central Air Defense Force, 16 February 1953
- Air Defense Command, 1 January 1960
- Tenth Air Force, 1 April 1966
- First Air Force, 15 September – 19 November 1969

=== Stations ===
- Great Falls Air Force Base, Montana, 1 March 1951 – 1 February 1952
- Richards-Gebaur Air Force Base, Missouri, 1 July 1961
- Duluth International Airport, Minnesota, 1 April 1966 – 19 November 1969

=== Components ===
==== Sectors ====
- Grand Forks Air Defense Sector: 1 January 1959 – 1 December 1963

Grand Forks Air Force Base, North Dakota

- Great Falls Air Defense Sector: 1 March 1959 – 1 April 1966

Malmstrom Air Force Base, Montana

- Kansas City Air Defense Sector (Manual): 1 July 1961 – 1 January 1962

Richards-Gebaur Air Force Base, Missouri

- Minot Air Defense Sector: 1 April 1959 – 15 August 1963

Minot Air Force Base, North Dakota

- Oklahoma City Air Defense Sector (Manual): 25 June 1963 – 1 April 1966

Richards-Gebaur Air Force Base, Missouri

- Sioux City Air Defense Sector: 1 July 1961 – 1 April 1966

Sioux City Municipal Airport, Iowa

==== Wing ====
- 507th Fighter Wing (Air Defense): 1 April 1966 – 30 September 1968

Kincheloe Air Force Base, Michigan

==== Groups ====
- 32d Fighter Group: 8 February 1957 – 1 August 1960

Minot Air Force Base, North Dakota

- 343d Fighter Group: 1 April 1966 – 15 September 1969; 14–19 November 1969

Duluth Municipal Airport, Minnesota

- 476th Fighter Group: 8 February 1957 – 1 April 1960

[[Glasgow Air Force Base, Montana

- 478th Fighter Group: 1 January – 1 July 1959

Grand Forks Air Force Base, North Dakota

- 545th Aircraft Control and Warning Group

Great Falls Air Force Base, Montana, 1 March 1951 – 6 February 1952

==== Interceptor squadrons ====
- 13th Fighter-Interceptor Squadron: 1 April 1960 – 1 January 1961

Glasgow Air Force Base, Montana

- 18th Fighter-Interceptor Squadron: 1 April 1966 – 15 September 1969

Grand Forks Air Force Base, North Dakota

- 29th Fighter-Interceptor Squadron: 8 November 1953 – 1 July 1960

Malmstrom Air Force Base, Montana

- 54th Fighter-Interceptor Squadron: 16 February 1953 – 25 December 1960

Ellsworth Air Force Base, South Dakota

- 62d Fighter-Interceptor Squadron: 1 April 1966 – 15 September 1969

K.I. Sawyer Air Force Base, Michigan

==== Missile squadrons ====
- 37th Air Defense Missile Squadron (BOMARC)

Kincheloe Air Force Base, Michigan, 1 April 1966 – 19 November 1969

- 74th Air Defense Missile Squadron (BOMARC)

Duluth AF Missile Site, Minnesota, 1 April 1966 – 19 November 1969

==== Radar squadrons ====
- 661st Radar Squadron

Selfridge Air Force Base, Michigan, 14–19 November 1969

- 665th Radar Squadron

Calumet Air Force Station, Michigan, 1 April 1966 – 19 November 1969

- 674th Radar Squadron

Osceola Air Force Station, Wisconsin, 1 April 1966 – 15 November 1969; 14–19 November 1969

- 676th Radar Squadron

Antigo Air Force Station, Wisconsin, 14 November 1969 – 30 June 1977

- 680th Aircraft Control and Warning Squadron

Yaak Air Force Station, Montana, 6 February 1952 – 16 February 1953

- 681st Aircraft Control and Warning Squadron

Cut Bank Air Force Station, Montana, 6 February 1952 – 1 July 1960

- 692d Radar Squadron

Baudette Air Force Station, Minnesota, 1 April 1966 – 19 November 1969

- 694th Aircraft Control and Warning Squadron

Lewistown Air Force Station, Montana, 1 September 1958 – 1 July 1960

- 706th Aircraft Control and Warning Squadron

Dickinson Air Force Station, North Dakota, 1 July 1958 – 1 January 1961

- 716th Aircraft Control and Warning Squadron

Kalispell Air Force Station, Montana, 15 February – 1 July 1960

- 721st Aircraft Control and Warning Squadron

Willmar Air Force Station, Minnesota, 1 January – 1 April 1959

- 731st Radar Squadron

Sundance Air Force Station, Wyoming, 1 December 1960 – 1 January 1961

- 739th Radar Squadron

Wadena Air Force Station, Minnesota, 14–19 November 1969

- 740th Aircraft Control and Warning Squadron

Ellsworth Air Force Base, South Dakota, 16 February 1953 – 1 January 1961

- 752d Radar Squadron

Empire Air Force Station, Michigan, 14 November 1966 – 19 November 1969

- 753d Radar Squadron

Sault Sainte Marie Air Force Station, Michigan, 14–19 November 1969

- 754th Radar Squadron

Port Austin Air Force Station, Michigan, 14–19 November 1969

- 756th Radar Squadron]]

Finland Air Force Station, Minnesota, 1 April 1966 – 15 September 1969

- 778th Aircraft Control and Warning Squadron

Havre Air Force Station, Montana, 6 February 1952 – 1 July 1960

- 779th Aircraft Control and Warning Squadron

Opheim Air Force Station, Montana, 6 February 1952 – 1 January 1961

- 780th Aircraft Control and Warning Squadron

Fortuna Air Force Station, North Dakota, 6 February 1952 – 1 January 1961

- 785th Radar Squadron

Finley Air Force Station, North Dakota, 20 May 1953 – 1 March 1956; 1 January 1959 – 1 April 1969

- 786th Aircraft Control and Warning Squadron

Minot Air Force Station, North Dakota, 16 February 1953 – 1 January 1961

- 787th Radar Squadron

Chandler Air Force Station, Minnesota, 1 July 1968 – 30 September 1969

- 788th Radar Squadron

Waverly Air Force Station, Iowa, 1 July 1968 – 30 September 1969

- 801st Aircraft Control and Warning Squadron

Malmstrom Air Force Base, Montana, 1 February 1956 – 1 July 1960

- 902d Aircraft Control and Warning Squadron

Miles City Air Force Station, Montana, 20 May 1953 – 1 January 1961

- 903d Aircraft Control and Warning Squadron

Gettysburg Air Force Station, South Dakota, 20 May 1953 – 1 March 1956; 1 January 1959 – 1 April 1969

- 908th Aircraft Control and Warning Squadron

Great Falls Air Force Base, Montana, 25 June 1953 – 25 September 1954

- 916th Aircraft Control and Warning Squadron

Beausejour Air Station, Manitoba, 1 January – 1 April 1959

==== Radar evaluation squadron ====
- 4677th Radar Evaluation Squadron

Hill Air Force Base, Utah, 1 January 1960 – 1 July 1961

== See also ==
- List of United States Air Force Aerospace Defense Command Interceptor Squadrons
- List of United States Air Force air divisions
- United States general surveillance radar stations
