= 545th Aircraft Control and Warning Group =

545th Aircraft Control and Warning Group
- Active: 1951-1952
- Country: United States
- Branch: United States Air Force
- Type: Comm9iand and Control
- Part of: Air Defense Command

The 545th Aircraft Control and Warning Group is an inactive United States Air Force unit. It was assigned to the 29th Air Division, stationed at Great Falls Air Force Base, Montana. It was inactivated on 6 February 1952.

This command and control organization activated on 1 March 1951, and was responsible for the organization, manning and equipping of new Aircraft Control and Warning (Radar) units. It was dissolved with the units being assigned directly to the 29th AD.

Components

- 679th Aircraft Control and Warning Squadron

Great Falls AFB, Montana, 1 March 1951 – 6 February 1952

- 680th Aircraft Control and Warning Squadron

Palermo AFS, New Jersey, 1 March 1951 – 6 February 1952

- 681st Aircraft Control and Warning Squadron

Cut Bank AFS, Montana, 1 March 1951 – 6 February 1952

- 778th Aircraft Control and Warning Squadron

Havre AFS, Montana, 1 March 1951 – 6 February 1952

- 779th Aircraft Control and Warning Squadron

Opheim AFS, Montana, 1 March 1951 – 6 February 1952

- 780th Aircraft Control and Warning Squadron

Fortuna AFS, North Dakota, 1 March 1951 – 6 February 1952

== See also ==
- List of United States Air Force aircraft control and warning squadrons
