= 24th Air Division =

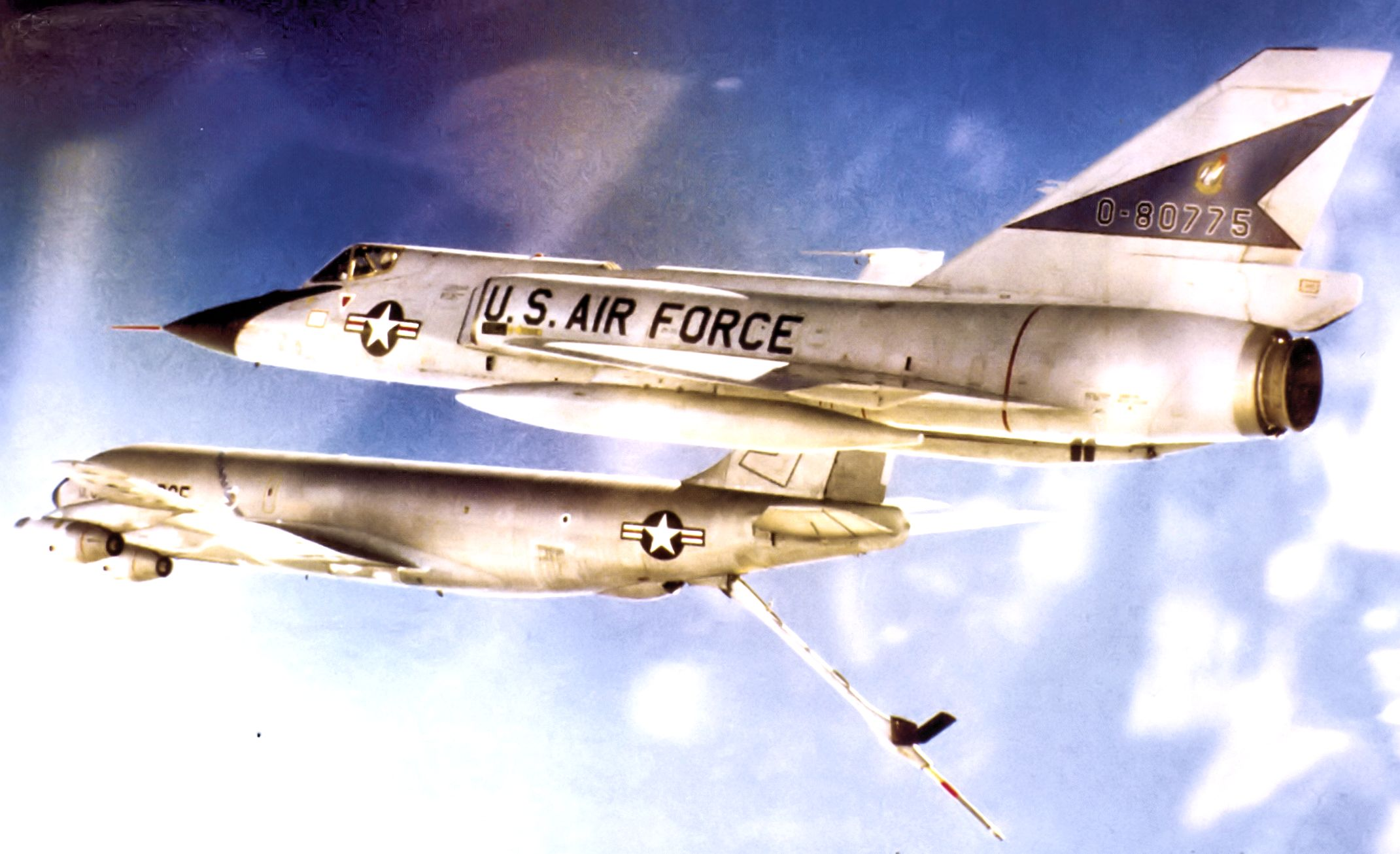
- 71st Fighter-Interceptor Squadron F-106A with a SAC KC-135 in 1970 (Note: Aircraft is Convair F-106A-100-CO Delta Dart Serial 58-0775 from Malmstrom AFB, Montana.)
- Active: 1969–1990
- Country: United States
- Branch: United States Air Force
- Role: Command of air defense forces
- Part of: Tactical Air Command

Insignia
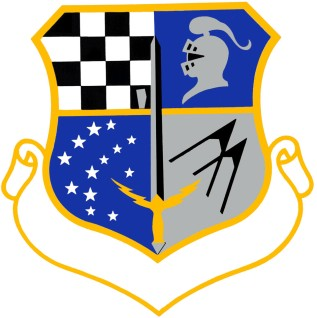
- 24th Air Division emblem (Approved 27 January 1972)

The 24th Air Division is an inactive United States Air Force intermediate echelon command and control organization. It was last assigned to First Air Force, Tactical Air Command (ADTAC). It was inactivated on 30 September 1990 at Griffiss Air Force Base, New York.

== History ==
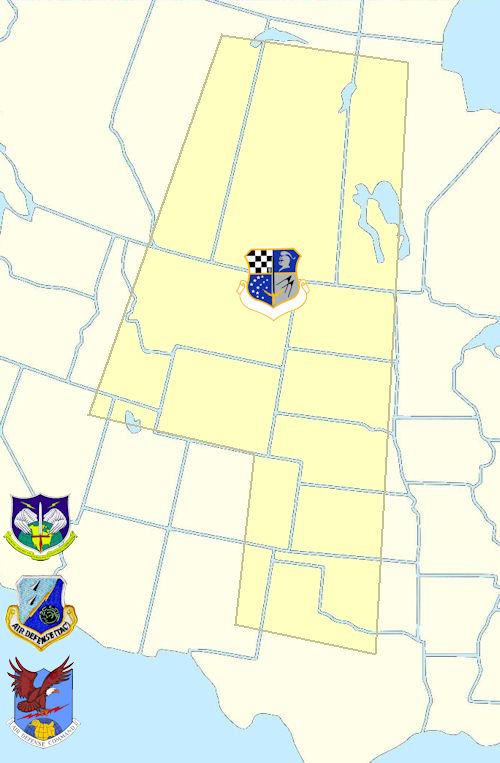
24th Air Division ADC/TAC/NORAD Region AOR 1969–1982

The Division was activated at Malmstrom Air Force Base, Montana in November 1969, replacing the 28th Air Division in an Aerospace Defense Command (ADCOM) realignment and re-organization of assets. Assigned additional designation of 24th NORAD Region and 24th CONAD Region upon activation with reporting to the NORAD Combat Operations Center at the Cheyenne Mountain Complex, Colorado.

The 24th AD was responsible for the air defense of a large area of the upper Great Plains from the 115th meridian west eastward to the 97th meridian west; from the 49th parallel north south to the 41st parallel north. This area encompassed most of Montana, Wyoming, North and South Dakota and most of Nebraska. It was also the command organization for the Semi Automatic Ground Environment (SAGE) Data Center (DC-20) at Malmstrom.

Tactical units assigned to the 24th participated in numerous training exercises such as Feudal Indian, Vigilant Overview, and Feudal Keynote. The scope of responsibility for the 24th AD was expanded in 1973 with further ADCOM unit inactivations and consolidations to include the area south along the 104th meridian west to the 33rd parallel north, east to the 97th meridian west. This included most of Kansas, Oklahoma and the panhandle region of Texas. Assumed additional designation 24th ADCOM Region, 8 December 1978

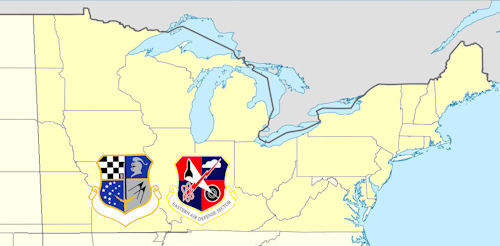
24th Air Division/Northeast Air Defense Sector AOR, 1982–1990

In 1979 it was incorporated into Tactical Air Command with the inactivation of ADCOM as a major command. Under Air Defense Tactical Air Command it continued its mission until 15 April 1982 when it moved to Griffiss Air Force Base, New York and assumed responsibility for most of New England, the northern Mid-Atlantic States and the upper Midwest.

In 1985 most active-duty units were inactivated or reassigned to other missions, and the air defense mission came under Air Force Reserve and Air National Guard units under First Air Force. The Division stood down on 30 September 1990, its command, mission, components, and assets were immediately transferred to the Northeast Air Defense Sector and Southeast Air Defense Sector.

== Lineage ==
- Established as the 24th Air Division on 18 November 1969

Activated on 19 November 1969
Inactivated 30 September 1990

=== Assignments ===
- Tenth Air Force, 19 November 1969
- Aerospace Defense Command, 1 December 1969
- Air Defense Tactical Air Command, 1 October 1979
- First Air Force, 6 December 1985 – 30 September 1990

=== Stations ===
- Malmstrom Air Force Base, Montana, 19 November 1969
- Griffiss Air Force Base, New York, 1 December 1983 – 30 September 1990

=== Components ===
==== Sectors ====
- Northeast Air Defense Sector: 1 July 1987 – 30 September 1990
- Southeast Air Defense Sector: 1 July 1987 – 30 September 1990

==== Groups ====
- 778th Air Defense Group, 1 March 1970 – 1 January 1974

Havre Air Force Station, Montana

- 779th Air Defense Group, 1 March 1970 – 1 February 1974

Opheim Air Force Station, Montana

- 780th Air Defense Group, 1 March 1970 – 1 January 1974

Fortuna Air Force Station, North Dakota

==== Squadrons ====
===== Evaluation Squadrons =====
- 17th Defense Systems Evaluation Squadron, 1 July 1974 – 13 July 1979

Malmstrom Air Force Base, Montana

- 4677th Defense Systems Evaluation Squadron, 2 October 1972 – 1 July 1974

Malmstrom Air Force Base, Montana

===== Interceptor Squadrons =====
- 5th Fighter-Interceptor Squadron, 19 November 1969 – 1 June 1983

Minot Air Force Base, North Dakota, 19 November 1969 – 15 April 1971

- 18th Fighter-Interceptor Squadron

Grand Forks Air Force Base, North Dakota

- 460th Fighter-Interceptor Squadron, 16 April 1971 – 30 June 1974

Grand Forks Air Force Base, North Dakota

- 49th Fighter-Interceptor Squadron, 23 September 1983 – 7 July 1987

Griffiss Air Force Base, New York

- 71st Fighter-Interceptor Squadron, 19 November 1979 – 1 July 1971

Malmstrom Air Force Base, Montana

- 319th Fighter-Interceptor Squadron, 1 July 1971 – 30 April 1972

Malmstrom Air Force Base, Montana

- 87th Fighter-Interceptor Squadron, 23 September 1983 – 1 October 1985

K.I. Sawyer Air Force Base, Michigan

===== Radar Squadrons =====
- 694th Radar Squadron

Lewistown Air Force Station, Montana, 19 November 1969 – 30 June 1971

- 778th Radar Squadron, 19 November 1969 – 1 March 1970, 1 January 1974 – 29 September 1979

Havre Air Force Station, Montana

- 779th Radar Squadron, 19 November 1969 – 1 March 1970, 1 February 1974 – 29 September 1979

Opheim Air Force Station, Montana

- 780th Radar Squadron, 19 November 1969 – 1 March 1970, 1 January 1974 – 29 September 1979

Fortuna Air Force Station, North Dakota

- 785th Radar Squadron, 19 November 1969 – 30 December 1979

Finley Air Force Station, North Dakota

- 786th Radar Squadron, 19 November 1969 – 29 September 1979

Minot Air Force Station, North Dakota

=== Emblem ===
"Per quarter fimbriated or, first quarter chequy alternating sable and argent, second and third quarter azure, on the second quarter a head in armor couped at the neck with visor open gray and of the second, on the third quarter thirteen mullets of five points argent, fourth quarter gray bearing two flight symbols bend sinisterwise sable, overall in pale a sword, point to chief blade gray and sable, base gray, hilt and guard or, all within a diminished bordure of the last."

"The emblem is symbolic of the unit and the Air Force colors, untramarine blue and golden yellow are used. Blue alludes to the sky, the primary theater of Air Force operations and yellow to the sun and the excellence required of personnel in their assigned tasks. The black and white checked design is representative of the unit's day and night commitment to the air defense mission. The knight's head in armor is symbolic of the personnel of the unit who stand alert, ever ready and maintain constant watch. The blue field not only symbolizes the sky, but space and the challenge of detecting and defending against threats from space. The stars on the field of blue represent the 13 original colonies. The sword symbolizes the armed might of the unit and ability to detect, intercept and deter any armed opposition. Interceptor forces are symbolized by the interceptor MACH symbols being directed skyward. Radar control and direction of defense forces are symbolized by lightning impulses radiating from the sword."

== See also ==
- List of United States Air Force air divisions
- United States general surveillance radar stations
- List of United States Air Force Aerospace Defense Command Interceptor Squadrons
