= Yaak Air Force Station =

Former radar station in Lincoln County, Montana

- Part of Pine Tree Line
- Located at Hensley Hill in Lincoln County, Montana; 25.1 miles (40.4 km) west of Rexford (eponym: the nearby Town of Yaak)

Site information
- Type: Air Force Station
- Controlled by: Air Defense Command
- Condition: demolished

Location
- Coordinates: 48°51′44″N 115°43′18″W

Site history
- In use: 1951-60

Garrison information
- Garrison: 680th Aircraft Control and Warning Squadron
- Unmanned Gap Filler radar annexes: P-11A (Bendix AN/FPS-14) Porthill, Idaho; 48°59′36″N 116°28′51″W: P-11B (Bendix AN/FPS-14) Eureka, Montana; 48°51′53″N 115°07′32″W: P-11C (Bendix AN/FPS-14) Moyie Springs, Idaho; 48°45′48″N 116°12′34″W

Yaak Air Force Station was an Air Defense Command general surveillance radar station in Lincoln County, Montana. Built as one of twenty-eight stations in the second segment of the Permanent System radar network, the 680th Aircraft Control and Warning Squadron was activated at the installation on 1 March 1951 for ground-controlled interception operating AN/FPS-3 and AN/FPS-4 radars in April 1952. An AN/FPS-6 was added in 1956, and the AN/FPS-4 was replaced by an AN/GPS-3 in 1957.

The station included living quarters for 172 people (including a 3-story barracks), 24 concrete trailer pads, motor pool building, plumbing/carpenter shop, paint house, mess hall, officers' club, office buildings, and dispensary. The "Dirty Shame Saloon" was established in a metal hut during 1951 just outside the main gate. Captain Robert Rice was the commander in 1954, and a recreation building, base exchange, and NCO club were available in 1955. A Rod and Gun Club was established in 1956.

The 680th AC&W Squadron was inactivated on 1 July 1960. The station was converted into an unmanned gap-filler radar site in 1960, and redesignated SM-151E, first operated by the 823d Radar Squadron at Mica Peak AFS, Washington, then the 716th Radar Squadron at Kalispell AFS, Montana (TM-179B). The radar station was declared excess by the Air Force to GSA in 1960–61. In early 1962, to allow access to the Yaak Mountain Lookout Tower, an observation tower not actually located on the site, a 90-acre portion of the former base was transferred by special use permit to the U.S. Forest Service. The main portion of the station was transferred by the Corps of Engineers to the Forest Service in 1965.

In 2014 a small 0.19 acres (0.077 ha) parcel of "Yaak Air Force Base" surrounded by land of a single landowner was transferred.
