= 801st Radar Squadron =

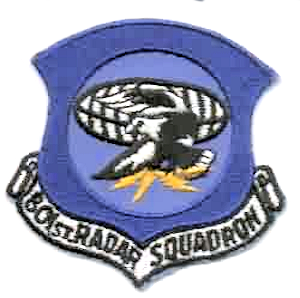
- Emblem of the 801st Radar Squadron
- Active: 1955-1969, 1971-1974
- Country: United States
- Branch: United States Air Force
- Type: General Radar Surveillance

The 801st Radar Squadron is an inactive United States Air Force unit. It was last assigned to the 28th Air Division, Aerospace Defense Command, stationed at Malmstrom Air Force Base, Montana. It was inactivated on 1 July 1974.

The unit was a General Surveillance Radar squadron providing for the air defense of the United States.

== Lineage ==
- Constituted as the 801st Aircraft Control and Warning Squadron on 6 July 1955

Activated on 8 October 1955
Redesignated 801st Radar Squadron (SAGE), 1 March 1961
Inactivated on 31 December 1969
Activated on 30 June 1971
Inactivated on 1 July 1974

Assignments

- 29th Air Division, 1 February 1956
- Great Falls Air Defense Sector, 1 July 1960
- 28th Air Division, 1 April 1966 - 31 December 1969
- 28th Air Division, 30 June 1971 - 1 July 1974

Stations

- Malmstrom AFB, MT, 1 February 1956 - 31 December 1969
- Malmstrom AFB, MT, 30 June 1971 - 1 July 1974
