= 680th Radar Squadron =

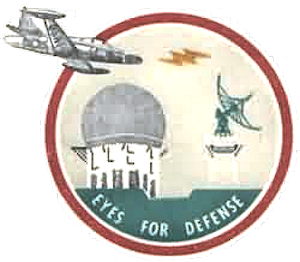
- Emblem of the 680th Radar Squadron
- Active: 1951-1960, 1962-1970
- Country: United States
- Branch: United States Air Force
- Type: General Radar Surveillance

The 680th Radar Squadron is an inactive United States Air Force unit. It was last assigned to the 20th Air Division, Aerospace Defense Command, stationed at Palermo Air Force Station, New Jersey. It was inactivated on 30 May 1970.

The unit was a General Surveillance Radar squadron providing for the air defense of the United States.

== Lineage ==
- Established as the 680th Aircraft Control and Warning Squadron

Activated on 1 March 1951
Discontinued on 1 July 1960

- Redesignated as the 680th Radar Squadron (SAGE)

Organized on 1 June 1962
Inactivated on 30 May 1970

Assignments

- 545th Aircraft Control and Warning Group, 1 March 1951
- 29th Air Division, 6 February 1952
- 4702d Defense Wing, 16 February 1953
- 9th Air Division, 8 October 1954
- 25th Air Division, 15 August 1958
- 4700th Air Defense Wing, 1 September 1958
- 25th Air Division, 15 May 1960 - 1 July 1960
- New York Air Defense Sector, 1 June 1962
- 21st Air Division, 1 April 1966
- 35th Air Division, 1 December 1967
- 33d Air Division, 1 April 1968
- 20th Air Division, 19 November 1969 - 30 May 1970

Stations

- Yaak AFS, Montana, 1 March 1951 – 1 July 1960
- Palermo AFS, New Jersey, 1 June 1962 – 30 May 1970
