= Minot Air Defense Sector =

Minot Air Defense Sector

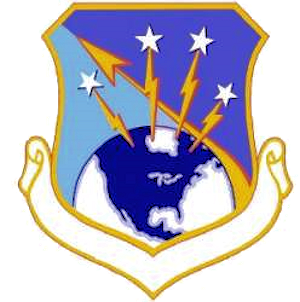
- Emblem of the Minot Air Defense Sector
- Active: 1959–1963
- Country: United States
- Branch: United States Air Force
- Role: Air Defense
- Part of: Air Defense Command

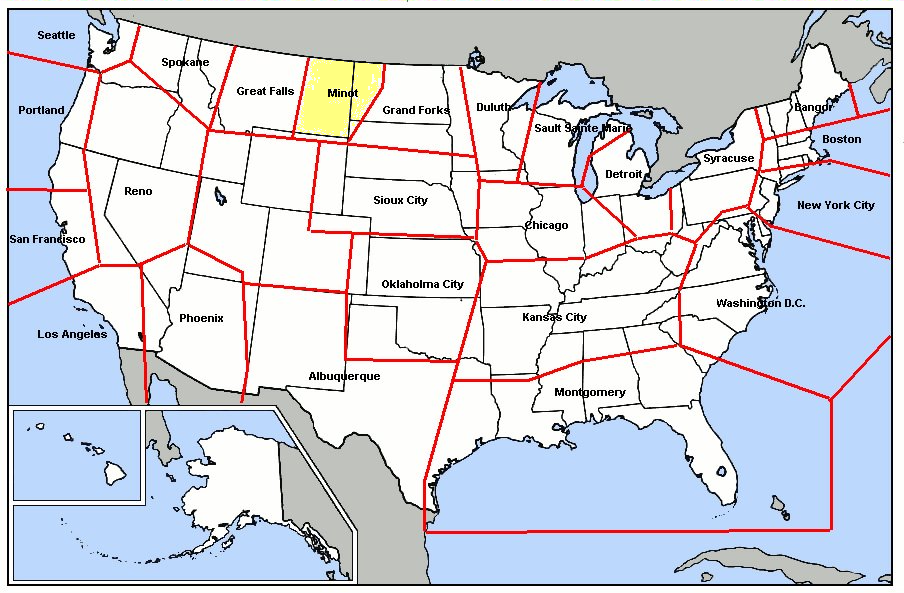
Map of Minot ADS

The Minot Air Defense Sector (MADS) is an inactive United States Air Force organization. Its last assignment was with the Air Defense Command 29th Air Division, being stationed at Minot Air Force Base, North Dakota. It was inactivated on 1 December 1963

== History ==
Established in April 1959 assuming control of former ADC Western Air Defense Force 27th Air Division units in western North Dakota and eastern Montana. The organization provided command and control over several aircraft and radar squadrons.

The sector operated a SAGE Air-Defense Control Center (ADCC) (DC-19). A SAGE Direction Center built, and an AN/FSQ-7 direction computers operated the live air picture. The Combat Control Center or CC and its accompanying An/FSQ - 8 computer were never installed or activated. The SAGE DC was consolidated with the Grand Forks Air Defense Sector on 1 March 1963, and inactivated on 1 December 1963.

=== Lineage ===
- Established as Minot Air Defense Sector on 1 April 1959

Inactivated on 1 December 1963

=== Assignments ===
- 29th Air Division, 1 April 1959 – 1 December 1963

=== Stations ===
- Minot AFB, North Dakota, 1 April 1959 – 1 December 1963

=== Components ===
==== Wing ====
- 32d Fighter Wing (Air Defense)

Minot AFB, North Dakota, 1 February 1961 – 1 July 1962

==== Group ====
- 32d Fighter Group (Air Defense)

Minot AFB, North Dakota, 1 August 1960 – 1 February 1961

==== Fighter squadrons ====
- 5th Fighter-Interceptor Squadron

Minot AFB, North Dakota, 1 July 1962 – 25 June 1963

- 13th Fighter-Interceptor Squadron

Minot AFB, North Dakota, 1 January 1961 – 25 June 1963

==== Radar squadrons ====
- 706th Radar Squadron

Dickinson AFS, North Dakota, 1 January 1961 – 25 June 1963

- 731st Radar Squadron

Sundance AFS, Wyoming, 1 January 1961 – 25 June 1963

- 740th Aircraft Control and Warning Squadron

Ellsworth AFB, South Dakota, 1 January 1961 – 15 August 1962

- 779th Radar Squadron

Opheim AFS, Montana, 1 January-15 June 1961

- 780th Radar Squadron

Fortuna AFS, North Dakota, 1 January 1961 – 25 June 1963

- 786th Radar Squadron

Minot AFS, North Dakota, 1 January 1961 – 25 June 1963

- 902d Radar Squadron

Miles City AFS, Montana, 1 January 1961 – 25 June 1963

== See also ==
- List of USAF Aerospace Defense Command General Surveillance Radar Stations
- Aerospace Defense Command Fighter Squadrons
