= Big Sky Bible College =

Fundamentalist college in Montana

Big Sky Bible College was a private, fundamentalist college that existed in Montana during the 1970s and 1980s. The school utilized the cantonment area of the former Lewistown Air Force Station as its campus; the site is near the ghost town of Maiden, north of Lewistown in the Judith Mountains. Originally named the Montana Institute of the Bible, the college was renamed on July 1, 1980 to its final title due to "institute" not being representative of its activities. The college is now defunct.
