= Great Falls Air Defense Sector =

Great Falls Air Defense Sector

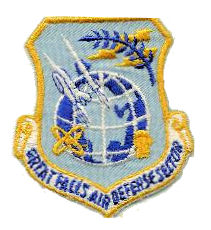
- Emblem of the Great Falls Air Defense Sector
- Active: 1959–1966
- Country: United States
- Branch: United States Air Force
- Role: Air Defense
- Part of: Air Defense Command

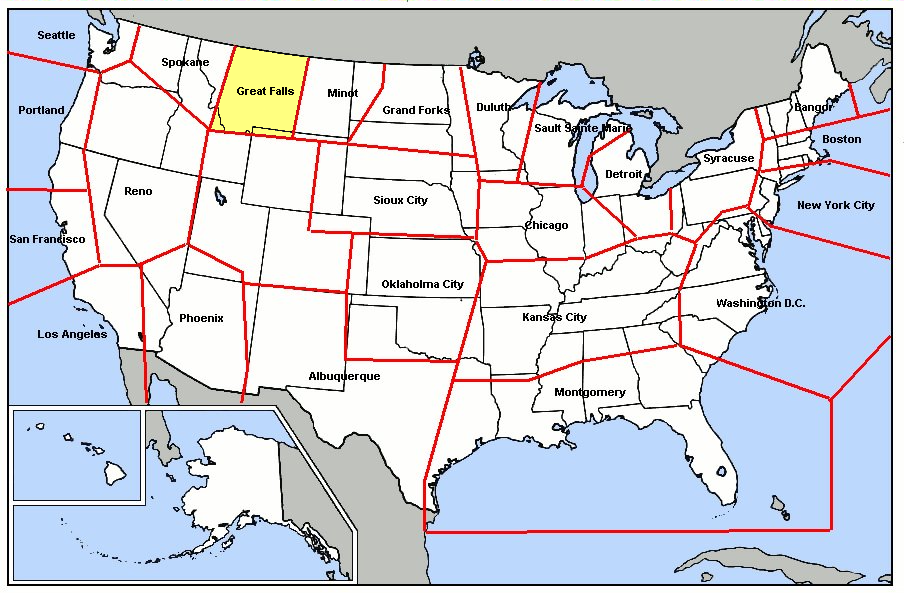
Map of Great Falls ADS

The Great Falls Air Defense Sector (GFADS) is an inactive United States Air Force organization. Its last assignment was with the Air Defense Command 29th Air Division, being stationed at Malmstrom Air Force Base, Montana. It was inactivated on 1 April 1966.

== History ==
GFADS was established in March 1959 assuming control of former ADC Central Air Defense Force units with a mission to provide air defense of central Montana. The organization provided command and control over several aircraft and radar squadrons.

On 15 February 1960 the new Semi Automatic Ground Environment (SAGE) Direction Center (DC-20) became operational. 47°30′59″N 111°10′55″W DC-20 was equipped with dual AN/FSQ-7 Computers. The day-to-day operations of the command was to train and maintain tactical flying units flying jet interceptor aircraft (F-94 Starfire; F-102 Delta Dagger; F-106 Delta Dart) in a state of readiness with training missions and series of exercises with SAC and other units simulating interceptions of incoming enemy aircraft.

The Sector was inactivated on 1 April 1966 as part of ADC reorganization and consolidation, the command being redesignated as the 28th Air Division.

=== Lineage ===
- Established as Great Falls Air Defense Sector on 1 March 1959

Inactivated on 1 April 1966; redesignated as 28th Air Division

=== Assignments ===
- 29th Air Division, 21 January 1960 – 1 April 1966

=== Stations ===
- Malmstrom AFB, Montana, 1 January 1960 – 1 April 1966

=== Components ===
==== Interceptor squadrons ====
- 5th Fighter-Interceptor Squadron

Minot AFB, North Dakota, 25 June 1963 – 1 April 1966

- 13th Fighter-Interceptor Squadron

Minot AFB, North Dakota, 25 June 1963 – 1 April 1966

- 29th Fighter-Interceptor Squadron

Malmstron AFB, Montana, 1953-1968

==== Radar squadrons ====
- 681st Radar Squadron

Cut Bank AFS, Montana, 1 July 1960 – 25 June 1965

- 694th Radar Squadron

Lewistown AFS, Montana, 1 July 1960 – 1 April 1966

- 706th Radar Squadron

Dickinson AFS, North Dakota, 25 June 1963 – 25 June 1965

- 716th Radar Squadron

Kalispell AFS, Montana, 1 July 1960 – 1 April 1966

- 778th Radar Squadron

Harve AFS, Montana, 1 July 1960 – 1 April 1966

- 779th Radar Squadron

Opheim AFS, Montana, 25 June 1963 – 1 April 1966

- 780th Radar Squadron

Fortuna AFS, North Dakota, 25 June 1963 – 1 April 1966

- 786th Radar Squadron

Minot AFS, North Dakota, 25 June 1963 – 1 April 1966

- 801st Radar Squadron

Malmstrom AFB, Montana, 1 July 1960 – 1 April 1966

- 902d Radar Squadron

Miles City AFS, Montana, 25 June 1963 – 1 April 1966

== See also ==
- List of USAF Aerospace Defense Command General Surveillance Radar Stations
- Aerospace Defense Command Fighter Squadrons
