= 28th Air Division =

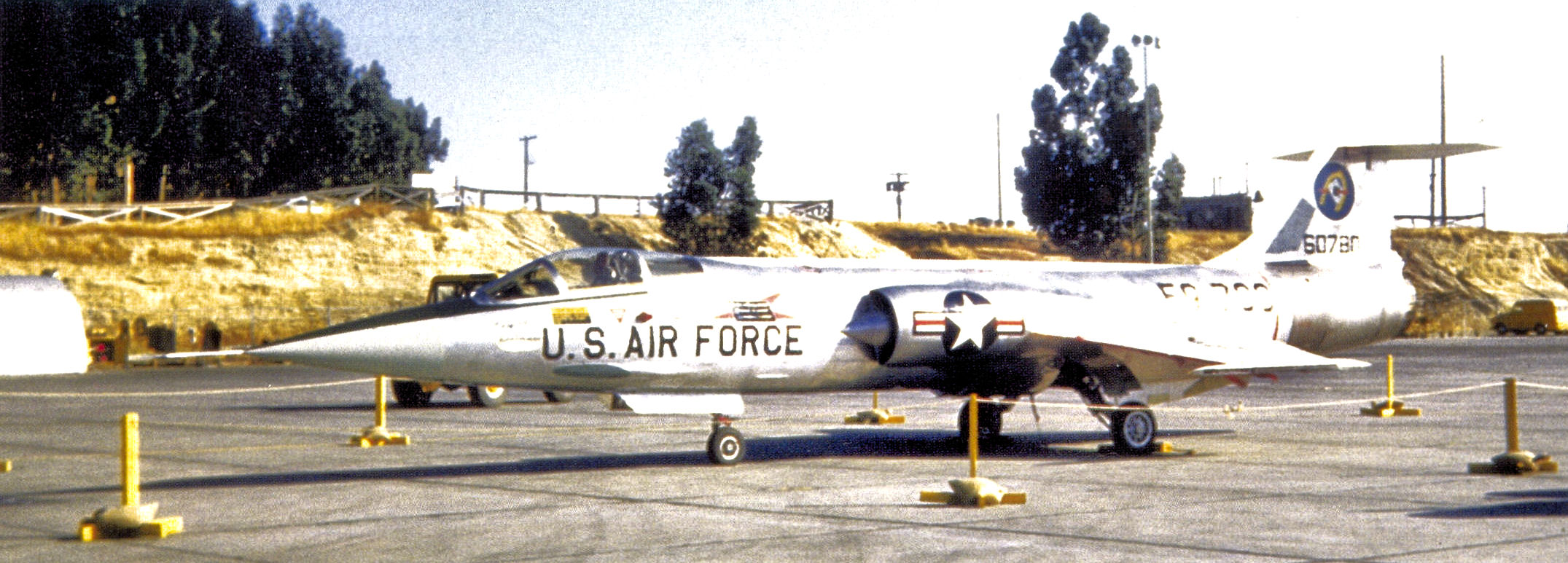
- 83d Fighter-Interceptor Squadron Lockheed F-104A
- Active: 1949–1969; 1985–1992
- Country: United States
- Branch: United States Air Force
- Role: Command of air defense forces
- Part of: Tactical Air Command
- Decorations: Air Force Outstanding Unit Award

Insignia
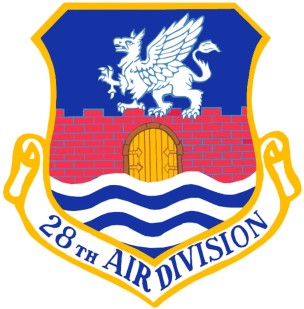
- 28th Air Division Emblem (Approved 14 May 1966)

The 28th Air Division is an inactive United States Air Force organization. Its last assignment was with Air Defense Tactical Air Command at Tinker Air Force Base, Oklahoma. It was inactivated on 29 May 1992.

== History ==
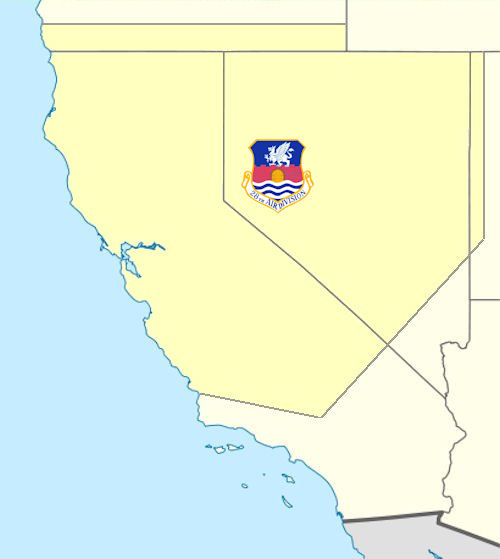
28th Air Division ADC AOR 1949–1960

Established in December 1949, the Air Defense Command 28th Air Division "assumed responsibility for conducting the air defense of an area that embraced California, Utah, Nevada, Colorado, and Arizona. It became part of the Western Air Defense Force in 1950. With no fighter interceptor squadrons directly assigned, the division used interceptors of the 78th Fighter Wing, based at Hamilton Air Force Base, California, as well as Air National Guard interceptors based within its geographical area."

"By November 1954 its geographical boundaries included northern California, southern Oregon, and parts of Nevada and Utah. The division participated frequently in air defense exercises with U.S. Army artillery, U.S. Navy interceptors, and Strategic Air Command bombers."

"On 15 February 1959, it added the San Francisco Air Defense Sector to its components, and the geographical area expanded to include California and Arizona, and parts of Oregon, Idaho, Nevada, and New Mexico."

"The division gained the Los Angeles, Phoenix, and Reno Air Defense Sectors and also the 552d Airborne Early Warning and Control Wing, whose Lockheed C-121 Constellation AWACS aircraft augmented naval picket ships in providing radar coverage seaward from the west coast of the United States. During 1961, it transitioned to a Semi Automatic Ground Environment system in all four of its sectors. Reorganization in 1963 altered the 28th's boundaries to include the states of Nevada, Arizona, Utah, and parts of California, Oregon, Idaho, Montana, Wyoming, Colorado, and New Mexico."

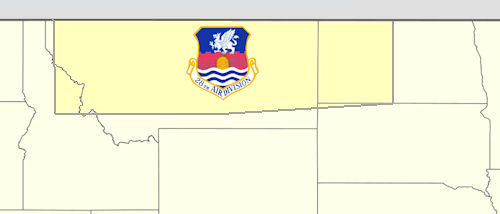
28th Air Division ADC AOR 1960–1969

"On 1 April 1966, the 28th was reassigned, in name only, to Malmstrom Air Force Base, Montana, and replaced the Great Falls Air Defense Sector. The division's area included Montana and part of North Dakota, and later, parts of South Dakota, Nebraska, and Wyoming. Assumed additional designation of 28th NORAD Region after activation of the NORAD Combat Operations Center at the Cheyenne Mountain Complex, Colorado and reporting was transferred to NORAD from ADC at Ent Air Force Base in April 1966."

The division in the 1960s and 1970s deployed aircraft and personnel from subordinate units in support of the Vietnam War. Became part of ADTAC on 1 October 1979 with the inactivation of ADC and the incorporation of the CONUS air defense mission into Tactical Air Command. Beginning in April 1985, the 28th provided theater and Air Force commands with airborne forces for surveillance, warning, command and control, communications, and electronic combat operations. It was the Tactical Air Command single manager for the E-3 Airborne Warning and Control System (AWACS), EC-130H Compass Call, EC-130E Airborne Battlefield Command and Control Center (ABCCC), and EC-135K Tactical Deployment Control Squadron (TDCS) in support of unified and specified commands.

Inactivated on 29 May 1992 as part of the inactivation of Air Defense Tactical Air Command, its mission being incorporated into the Air Combat Command Western Air Defense Sector.

== Lineage ==
- Established as the 28 Air Division (Defense) on 8 November 1949

Activated on 8 December 1949
Inactivated on 1 February 1952

- Organized on 1 February 1952

Redesignated: 28 Air Division (SAGE) on 1 July 1960
Redesignated: 28 Air Division on 1 April 1966
Inactivated on 19 November 1969

- Activated on 1 April 1985

Inactivated on 29 May 1992

=== Assignments ===
- Fourth Air Force, 8 December 1949
- Western Air Defense Force, 1 August 1950 – 1 July 1960
- Air Defense Command, 1 July 1960
- Tenth Air Force, 1 April 1966 – 19 November 1969
- Air Defense Tactical Air Command, 1 April 1985 – 29 May 1992

=== Stations ===
- Hamilton Air Force Base, California, 8 December 1949 – 1 April 1966
- Malmstrom Air Force Base, Montana, 1 April 1966 – 19 November 1969
- Tinker Air Force Base, Oklahoma, 1 April 1985 – 29 May 1992

=== Components ===
==== Sectors ====
- Los Angeles Air Defense Sector (LAADS)

Norton Air Force Base, California, 1 July 1960 – 1 April 1966

- Phoenix Air Defense Sector (PhADS)

Luke Air Force Base, Arizona, 1 July 1960 – 1 April 1966

- Reno Air Defense Sector (ReADS)

Stead Air Force Base, Nevada, 1 July 1960 – 1 April 1966

- San Francisco Air Defense Sector (SFADS)

Beale Air Force Base, California, 15 February 1959 – 1 August 1963

==== Wings ====
- 78th Fighter Wing (Air Defense)

Hamilton Air Force Base, California, 18 October 1956 – 1 July 1960; 1 August 1963 – 1 April 1966

- 552d Early Warning and Control Wing

McClellan Air Force Base, California, 1 July 1960 – 1 April 1966; 1 April 1985 – 29 May 1992

==== Groups ====
- 78th Fighter Group (Air Defense)

Hamilton Air Force Base, California, 18 August 1955 – 18 October 1956

- 408th Fighter Group (Air Defense)

Kingsley Field, Oregon, 8 April 1956 – 1 March 1959

- 542d Aircraft Control and Warning Group

Hamilton Air Force Base, California, 1 January 1951 – 6 February 1952

- 566th Air Defense Group

Hamilton Air Force Base, California, 7 November 1952 – 18 August 1955

==== Interceptor squadrons ====
- 5th Fighter-Interceptor Squadron

Minot Air Force Base, North Dakota, 1 April 1966 – 19 November 1969

- 13th Fighter-Interceptor Squadron

Glasgow Air Force Base, Montana, 1 April 1966 – 30 June 1968

- 18th Fighter-Interceptor Squadron

Grand Forks Air Force Base, North Dakota, 15 September – 19 November 1969

- 29th Fighter-Interceptor Squadron

Malmstrom Air Force Base, Montana, 1 April 1966 – 30 June 1968

==== Radar squadrons ====
- 658th Aircraft Control and Warning Squadron

Winnemucca Air Force Station, Nevada, 1 February 1956 – 1 July 1960

- 666th Aircraft Control and Warning Squadron

Mill Valley Air Force Station, California, 6 February 1952 – 1 July 1960

- 668th Aircraft Control and Warning Squadron

Mather Air Force Base, California. 6 February 1952 – 1 July 1960

- 682d Aircraft Control and Warning Squadron

Almaden Air Force Station, California, 1 September 1957 – 1 July 1960

- 694th Radar Squadron

Lewistown Air Force Station, Montana, 1 April 1966 – 19 November 1969

- 716th Radar Squadron

Kalispell Air Force Station, Montana, 1 April 1966 – 19 November 1969

- 774th Aircraft Control and Warning Squadron

Madera Air Force Station, California, 6 February 1952 – 1 July 1960

- 775th Aircraft Control and Warning Squadron

Cambria Air Force Station, California, 6 February 1952 – 1 October 1954

- 776th Aircraft Control and Warning Squadron

Point Arena Air Force Station, California, 6 February 1952 – 1 July 1960

- 777th Aircraft Control and Warning Squadron

Klamath Air Force Station, Oregon, 6 February 1952 – 1 March 1959

- 778th Radar Squadron

Havre Air Force Station, Montana, 1 April 1966 – 19 November 1969

- 779th Radar Squadron

Opheim Air Force Station, Montana, 1 April 1966 – 19 November 1969

- 780th Radar Squadron

Fortuna Air Force Station, North Dakota, 1 April 1966 – 19 November 1969

- 785th Radar Squadron

Finley Air Force Station, North Dakota, 15 September 1969 – 19 November 1969

- 786th Radar Squadron

Minot Air Force Station, North Dakota, 1 April 1966 – 19 November 1969

- 801st Aircraft Control and Warning Squadron

Malmstrom Air Force Base, Montana, 1 April 1966 – 31 December 1969; 30 June 1971 – 1 July 1974

- 827th Aircraft Control and Warning Squadron

Keno Air Force Station, Oregon, 1 September 1957 – 1 March 1959

- 858th Aircraft Control and Warning Squadron

Fallon Air Force Station, Nevada, 8 October 1955 – 1 July 1960

- 859th Aircraft Control and Warning Squadron

Red Bluff Air Force Station, California, 1 April 1956 – 1 March 1959

- 866th Aircraft Control and Warning Squadron

Tonopah Air Force Station, Nevada, 1 October 1956 – 1 July 1960

- 902d Radar Squadron

Miles City Air Force Station, Montana, 1 April 1966 – 18 June 1968

==== Other squadrons ====
- 4754th Radar Evaluation Squadron

Hill Air Force Base, Utah, 1 July 1961 – 1 April 1966

- 8th Tactical Deployment Control Squadron (later, 8th Air Deployment Control Squadron)

Tinker AFB, Oklahoma, 1 March 1986 - 29 May 1992

- 41st Electronic Combat Squadron

Davis-Monthan AFB, Arizona, 1 April 1985 - 1 May 1992

== See also ==
- List of United States Air Force Aerospace Defense Command Interceptor Squadrons
- List of United States Air Force air divisions
- United States general surveillance radar stations
