= AN/FPS-4 radar =

US Air Force height-finder radar

AN/FPS-4
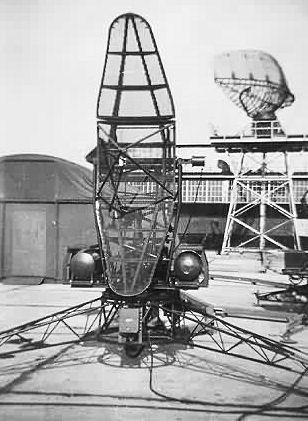
- RCA AN/FPS-4 Radar
- Country of origin: United States
- Manufacturer: Zenith, RCA
- Introduced: 1948
- No. built: 450
- Type: Height-Finder Radar
- Frequency: X-band (9–9.160 GHz)
- Range: 60 mi (97 km)
- Altitude: 60,000 ft (18,000 m)
- Power: 250 KW
- Other names: AN/TPS-10, AN/MPS-8 (Mobile)

The AN/FPS-4 Radar was a Height-Finder Radar used by the United States Air Force Air Defense Command.

MIT's Radiation Laboratory developed and produced the first version of this radar near the end of World War II. Zenith produced the A-model sets in the post-war period. The vertically mounted antenna was three feet wide and ten feet long. Two operators were needed to run the set. The initial model operated at a frequency of 9000 to 9160 MHz and had a maximum reliable range for bombers of 60 miles at 10,000 feet.

In accordance with the Joint Electronics Type Designation System (JETDS), the radar's "AN/FPS-4" designation represents the 4th design of an Army-Navy electronic device for fixed search radar. The JETDS system also now is used to name all Department of Defense electronic systems.

An updated version designated the AN/FPS-4 was produced by the Radio Corporation of America (RCA) beginning in 1948. Some 450 copies of this and the trailer-mounted AN/MPS-8 version were built between 1948 and 1955.

Technical Specs: (Radio Research catalog) X BAND HEIGHT FINDER Radar type: AN/TPS-10D. Freq band: 9230 to 9404 mc. Pwr output and range: 250KW, 60/120 mi. Indicator: RHI. Magnetron type: 6002/QK221. Rep rate: .5 & 2 microsec 539 pps. Pwr input: 115 V 400 cy AC. Mfr: RCA.

RHI 12" CRT Range 0-60,000 ft. 200 miles. Input: 115 V 400 cy AC. Mfr: RCA type AN/TPS-10D Radar

== See also ==
- Joint Electronics Type Designation System – Unclassified designation system for United States military electronic equipment
- List of radars
- List of military electronics of the United States
