= Malmstrom Air Force Base =

Military base in Montana, United States

- Great Falls, Montana in United States
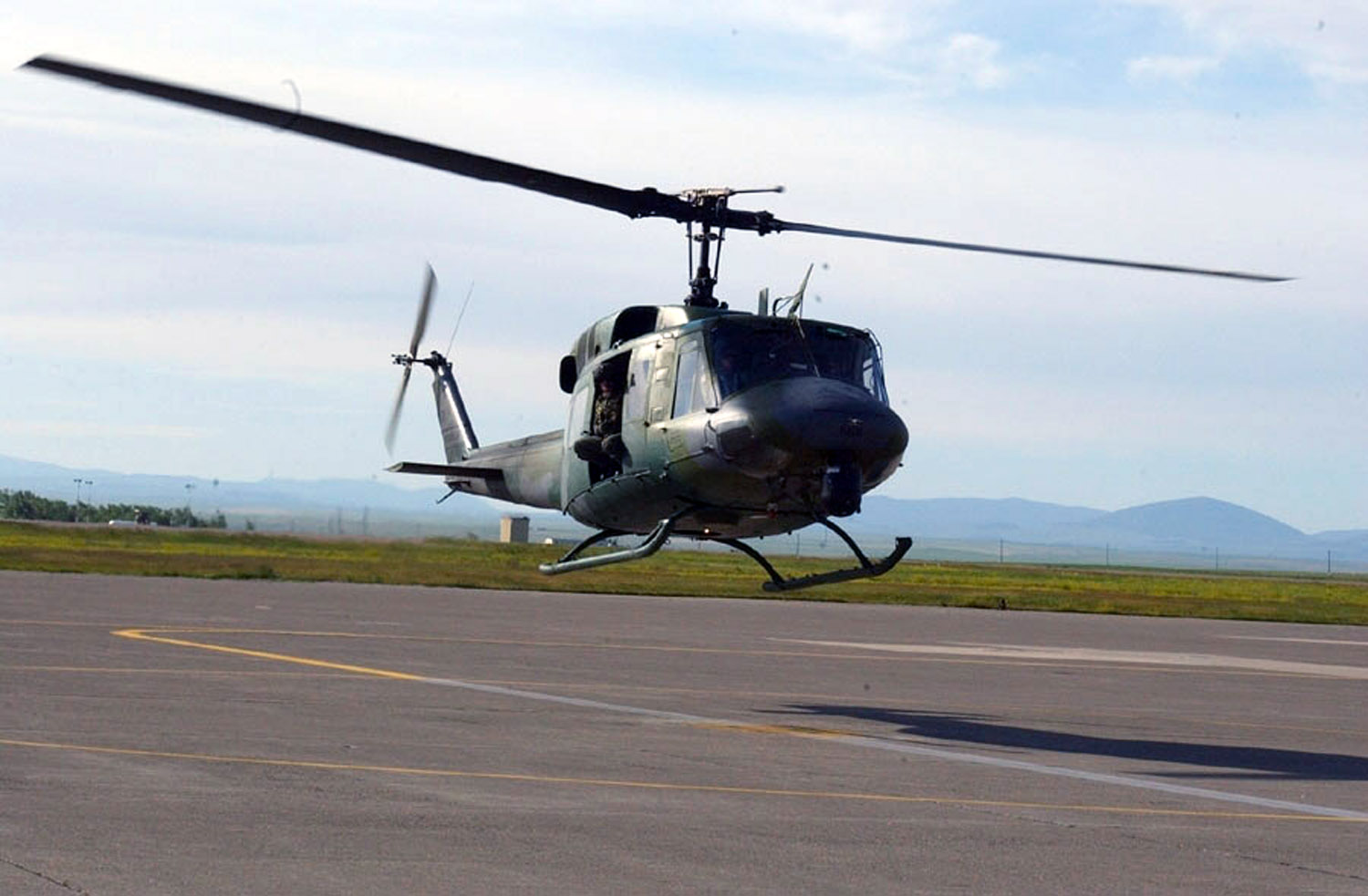
- A UH-1N Iroquois of the 40th Helicopter Squadron prepares to land at Malmstrom AFB.

Site information
- Type: US Air Force base
- Owner: Department of Defense
- Operator: United States Air Force
- Controlled by: Air Force Global Strike Command
- Condition: Operational
- Website: www.malmstrom.af.mil

Location
- Location within Montana Location within the United States Location within North America
- Coordinates: 47°30′17″N 111°11′14″W

Site history
- Built: 1942 (as Great Falls Army Air Base)
- In use: 1942 – present

Garrison information
- Current commander: Colonel Daniel Voorhies
- Garrison: 341st Missile Wing

Airfield information
- Identifiers: ICAO: KGFA, FAA LID: GFA, WMO: 727755
- Elevation: 1,058 metres (3,471 ft) AMSL
Helipads
Number	Length and surface
H1	30 metres (98 ft) asphalt
H2	30 metres (98 ft) concrete
- Note: Fixed wing aircraft flying ceased in 1996. Source: AirNav.com

Malmstrom Air Force Base is a United States Air Force base in Cascade County, Montana, United States, adjacent to the city of Great Falls. It was named in honor of World War II POW Colonel Einar Axel Malmstrom. Malmstrom AFB is the largest of three US Air Force Bases that maintain and operate the Minuteman III intercontinental ballistic missile. It is the home of the 341st Missile Wing (341 MW) of the Air Force Global Strike Command (AFGSC). For statistical purposes, the United States Census Bureau has defined Malmstrom Air Force Base as a census-designated place (CDP). It had a population of 3,472 at the 2010 census.

== History ==
=== World War II ===
Malmstrom Air Force Base traces its beginnings back to 1939 when World War II broke out in Europe. Concern about the war caused the local Chamber of Commerce to contact two Montana senators, Burton K. Wheeler and James E. Murray and request they consider development of a military installation in Great Falls. In addition, appeals were made to the Secretary of War, Harry H. Woodring. In 1941, the Civil Aeronautics Authority provided the money for the development of the Great Falls Municipal Airport. In May 1942, construction began on an Army Air Corps base six miles (10 km) east of Great Falls. The base was known as East Base.

In November 1942, a survey team evaluated an area near the Green Mill Dance Club and Rainbow Dam Road approximately six miles (9.7 km) east of Great Falls. Great Falls, along with ten other northern tier sparsely populated sites, was considered for a heavy bomber training base. Construction began on Great Falls Army Air Base (AAB) on 8 June 1942. The base was informally known as East Base since the 7th Ferrying Group was stationed at Great Falls Municipal Airport on Gore Hill (known as Gore Field during its military use). Its mission was to establish an air route between Great Falls and Ladd Field, Fairbanks, Alaska, as part of the United States Lend-Lease Program that supplied the Soviet Union with aircraft and supplies needed to fight the German Army.

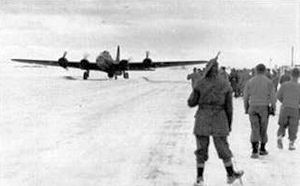
The first B-17 landing at Great Falls AAB, 30 November 1942

Great Falls AAB was assigned to II Bomber Command, Second Air Force. Its initial base operating unit was the 352d Base HQ and Air Base Squadron. Airfield operations began on 30 November 1942 when the first B-17 Flying Fortress landed at the new base. Four Bombardment Groups, the 2nd, 385th, 390th, and 401st, trained at Great Falls AAB from November 1942 to October 1943 under Army Air Force Training Command. Group Headquarters and one of the Groups' four squadrons were stationed in Great Falls with the other squadrons stationed on sub-bases at Cut Bank, Glasgow, and Lewistown, Montana. Aircraft would take off at a predetermined time, form up in squadron formation over their respective location, and later, over central Montana, join up in group formation. These bombardment groups went on to participate in decisive raids over Germany as part of Eighth Air Force opening the door for Allied daylight precision bombing.

Upon completion of the B-17 training program, in October 1943, Great Falls Army Air Base was transferred to the Air Transport Command (ATC) and units from Gore Field were transferred to the base. The base was considerably expanded when more buildings were constructed, including a consolidated mess, a post exchange, a theater, and a 400-bed hospital. Air Transport Command also established aerial port facilities for passengers and cargo, as well as a flight service center. The ATC 90th Ferrying Squadron (7th Ferrying Group) was assigned to the base which performed operations in support of the Lend Lease Program with the Soviet Union.

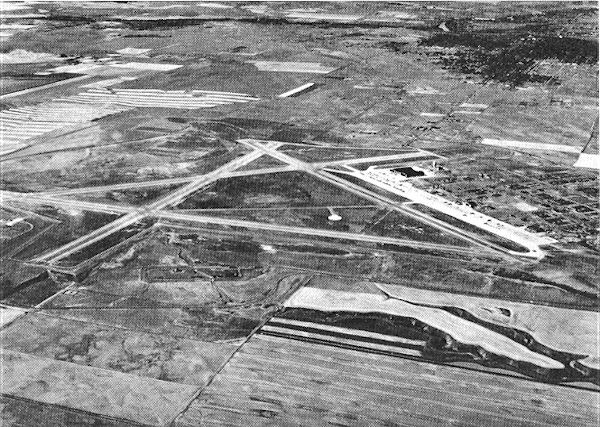
Oblique aerial photo of Great Falls AAB, looking south-westward, about 1944

At Great Falls, Bell P-39 Airacobras, Douglas C-47 Skytrains, North American B-25 Mitchells, and Douglas A-20 Havocs aircraft arrived by rail and were assembled on base, along with others that were flown in by both military and Women Airforce Service Pilots (WASPs). These aircraft were later flown by U.S. pilots by way of the Northwest Staging Route through Canada, to Fairbanks, Alaska, and transferred to Soviet pilots who in turn flew them into Siberia via the Alaskan-Siberian Route (ALSIB). A total of 1,717,712 pounds (779,141 kg) of cargo containing aircraft parts, tools miscellaneous equipment, explosives and medical supplies were shipped through Great Falls Army Air Base to the Soviet Union.

This included one of the greatest technology transfers (and espionage operations) in the history of the world. According to Richard Rhodes the plans for the atomic bomb, hundreds of tons of nuclear weapons materials, strategic intelligence reports, and the plans for much of the most advanced aviation, electronic, and heavy industrial technology was transferred through Gore Field and East Base in sealed diplomatic containers. Dozens, if not hundreds, of Soviet agents also entered the U.S. through Great Falls as part of the Soviet Lend-lease delegation and staff.

Aircraft shipments to the Soviet Union stopped in September 1945, when World War II ended, with approximately 8,000 aircraft having been processed in a 21-month period.

Following World War II, Great Falls Army Air Base (later Great Falls Air Force Base and Malmstrom Air Force Base) played an important role in US defense during the Cold War era (1948–1991). The base was assigned or attached to several major commands, and its assigned units performed a wide variety of missions.

=== Military Air Transport Service ===
After World War II ended Great Falls AAB assumed a support mission for military personnel assigned to Alaskan military installations. A reserve training unit was established by the Continental Air Forces Fourth Air Force under the 418th Army Air Force Base Unit on 10 October 1946. In September 1947, the United States Air Force became a separate service and the base's name was changed to Great Falls Air Force Base.

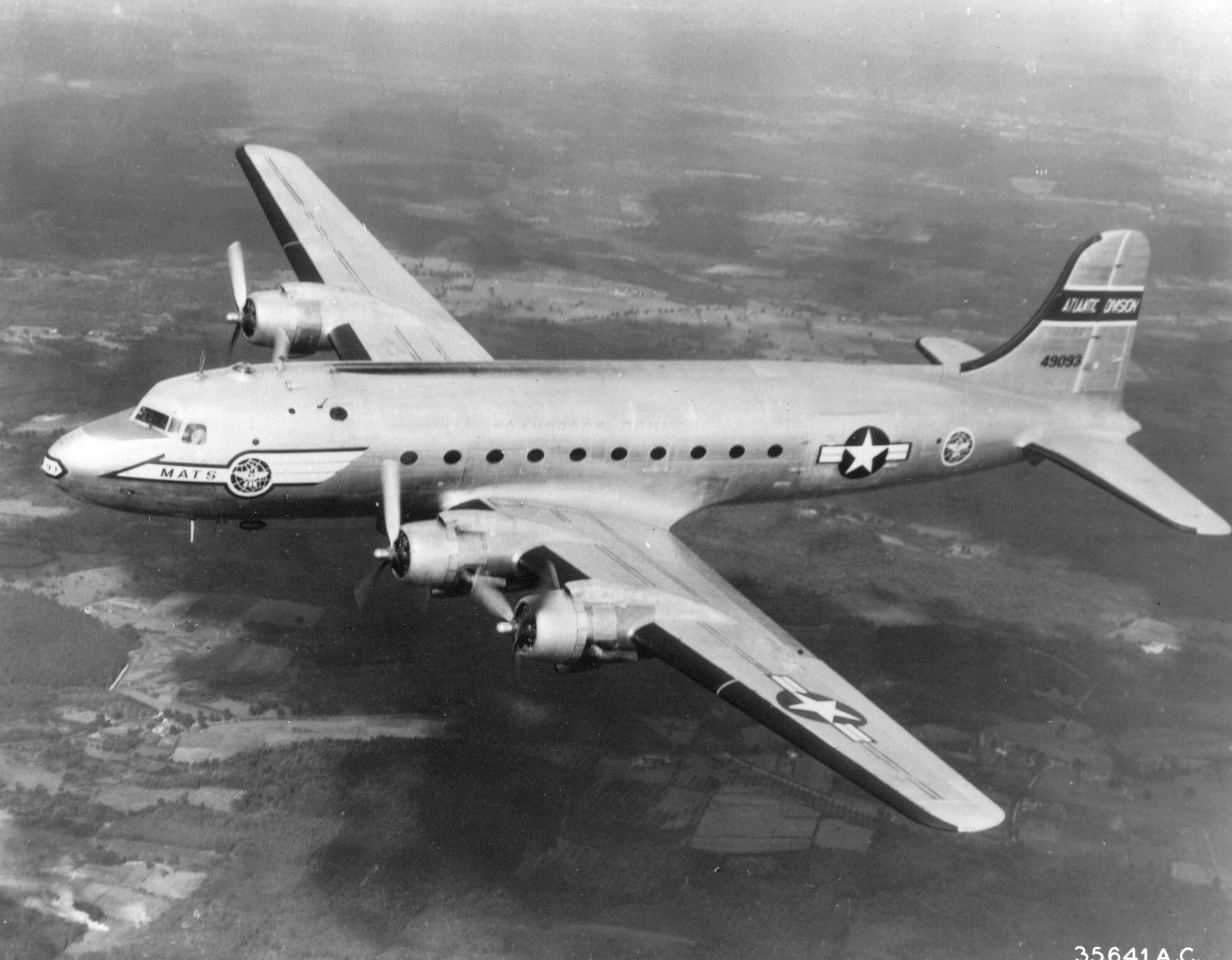
USAF C-54 Skymaster

Tensions between the United States and the Soviet Union increased dramatically when the Soviet Union closed all land travel between the western occupation sectors of Germany and the American, French and British sectors of Berlin. The Western allies decided to try to supply Berlin by air. On 25 June 1948 "Operation Vittles," the strategic airlift of supplies to Berlin's 2,000,000 inhabitants, was initiated, beginning what became known as the Berlin Airlift. Great Falls AFB played a critical role in assuring the success of this vital operation. Officials selected the base as the only replacement aircrew training site for Berlin Airlift-bound C-54 Skymasters, reinforcing the United States Air Forces in Europe. Thus the 517th Air Transport Wing was activated. Using radio beacons, Great Falls AFB was transformed to resemble Tempelhof Airport in Berlin, Germany. Hundreds of pilots and flight engineers, many of whom were recalled to active duty, were qualified on the C-54 aircraft and on flight procedures to and from Berlin by practicing on ground mock-ups and flying simulated airlift missions.

Later, the 517th Air Transport Wing was redesignated the 1701st Air Transport Wing on 1 June 1948 when Air Transport Command was redesignated the Military Air Transport Service (MATS). Great Falls was assigned to the MATS Pacific Division. Transport units assigned to Great Falls were the 5th, 6th and 7th Air Transport Squadrons (later redesignated 1270th, 1271st and 1272d ATS) which flew C-54 Skymasters.

MATS reopened the C-54 Flight Training School as the 1272 Medium Transition Training Unit (Squadron) in May 1950, one month before the Korean War began. The unit's primary mission was the routing and scheduling of flights throughout the Pacific Ocean region and in support of Allied forces in the conflict. The 1701st ATW was later replaced by the 1300th Air Base Wing.

Great Falls became the temporary home of the 582nd Air Resupply and Communications Wing on 1 May 1953 which was transferred from Mountain Home AFB, Idaho. The 582d was a special operations unit which focused on PSYWAR missions. It deployed from Great Falls to RAF Molesworth, United Kingdom (UK), and set up operations as part of USAFE's Third Air Force in February 1954.

=== Malmstrom ===
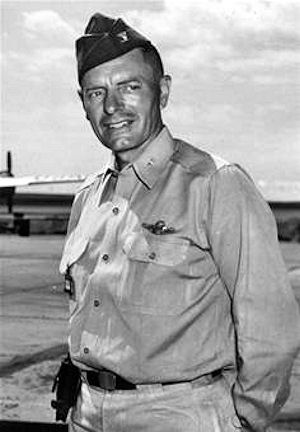
Colonel Einar Malmstrom

Originally named Great Falls Army Air Base, later Great Falls Air Force Base, the facility was renamed Malmstrom Air Force Base on 1 October 1955 in honor of Colonel Einar Axel Malmstrom (1907–1954). Shot down on his 58th combat fighter mission in World War II, Malmstrom became the US commander of Luftwaffe Stalag Luft I South Compound, a prisoner-of-war camp at Barth, Germany. After his release and return to active Air Force service, he died in the crash of a T-33 Shooting Star trainer on 21 August 1954 near Great Falls Air Force Base. In the short period of his tenure as vice wing commander, Colonel Malmstrom endeared himself to the local community. Saddened by the loss, the people of Great Falls began a drive to rename the base after him.

=== Air Defense Command ===
Great Falls (later Malmstrom AFB) played a major aerial defense role in North American air defense mission. Although the base was not assigned to Air Defense Command, the attached 29th Air Division was activated at Great Falls AFB in early 1950, bringing with them command and control authority of fighter interceptor squadrons, an aircraft control and warning squadron, and ground observer detachments in Montana, Idaho, Wyoming, and parts of Nevada, Utah, and Colorado as part of the Air Defense Command Western Air Defense Force. The 29th Fighter Interceptor Squadron was activated in 1953 and remained at Malmstrom until 1968, initially flying F-94C Starfire and later F-101 Voodoo interceptors.

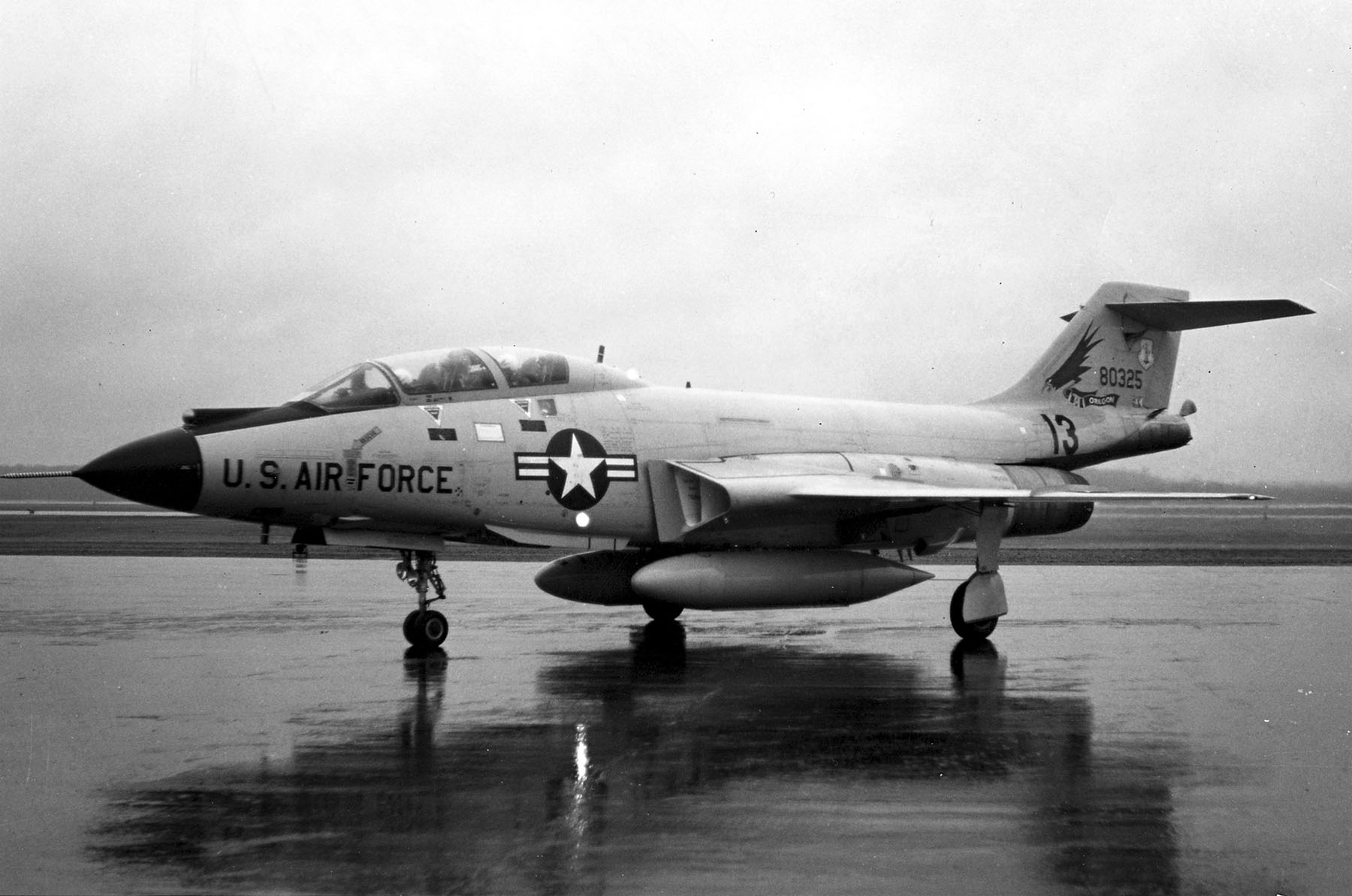
McDonnell F-101B-110-MC Voodoo AF Serial No. 58-0325. This was the type of aircraft flown by Air Defense Command at Malmstrom AFB. After its active service was over, this aircraft was retired to the National Museum of the United States Air Force where it is now on static display.

Great Falls was reassigned to the Central Air Defense Force at Richards-Gebaur Air Force Base in 1953. The 29th Air Division's area of responsibility changed to include Montana, North and South Dakota and Nebraska. The 29th supervised the training of its units, and participated in numerous training exercises. On 1 July 1961, the 29th AD was relocated to Richards Gebaur AFB, Missouri.

By 1954, several aircraft control and warning (radar) squadrons had been formed at the base. The 903d Aircraft Control and Warning Squadron was one of them, and operated an AN/TPS-1D (termed a "gap-filler"). This radar was used probably for training purposes. The 903rd AC&W Squadron subsequently relocated to Gettysburg AFS, South Dakota.

In 1957, under the control of the 801st Aircraft Control and Warning Squadron, the Malmstrom AFB radar station became operational with AN/FPS-20 search and AN/FPS-6 height-finder radars. A second AN/FPS-6 series height-finder radar was added in 1960, and subsequently was upgraded to an AN/FPS-90 set. In 1959 Malmstrom was performing air-traffic-control duties for the Federal Aviation Administration (FAA), and joined the Semi Automatic Ground Environment (SAGE) system on 1 March 1961, the squadron being redesignated as the 801st Radar Squadron (SAGE). In 1964 Malmstrom received an AN/FPS-24 search radar, replacing the AN/FPS-20.

The 801st Radar Squadron was inactivated on 31 December 1969 due to budget reductions. However, the radar site itself rejoined the SAGE network on 30 June 1971. The FAA operated an AN/FPS-65 search radar (which had replaced the AN/FPS-24), and the Air Force added an AN/FPS-90 height-finder radar. This height-finder radar later became an AN/FPS-116 for the Joint Surveillance System (JSS) Program, then was removed c. 1988. The Malmstrom AFB radar site was closed altogether in 1996, and after the air force shut down the ADCOM Z-147 site, the FAA took over operation as part of the Joint Surveillance System (JSS).

Z-147 was completely replaced by a new ARSR-4 JSS site on Bootlegger Ridge, about 14 miles northeast of Great Falls AFB. Designated by NORAD as Western Air Defense Sector (WADS) Ground Equipment Facility J-77A.

In 1959 a SAGE data center (DC-20) was established at Malmstrom. The SAGE system was a network linking Air Force (and later FAA) general surveillance radar stations into a centralized center for air defense, intended to provide early warning and response for a Soviet nuclear attack.

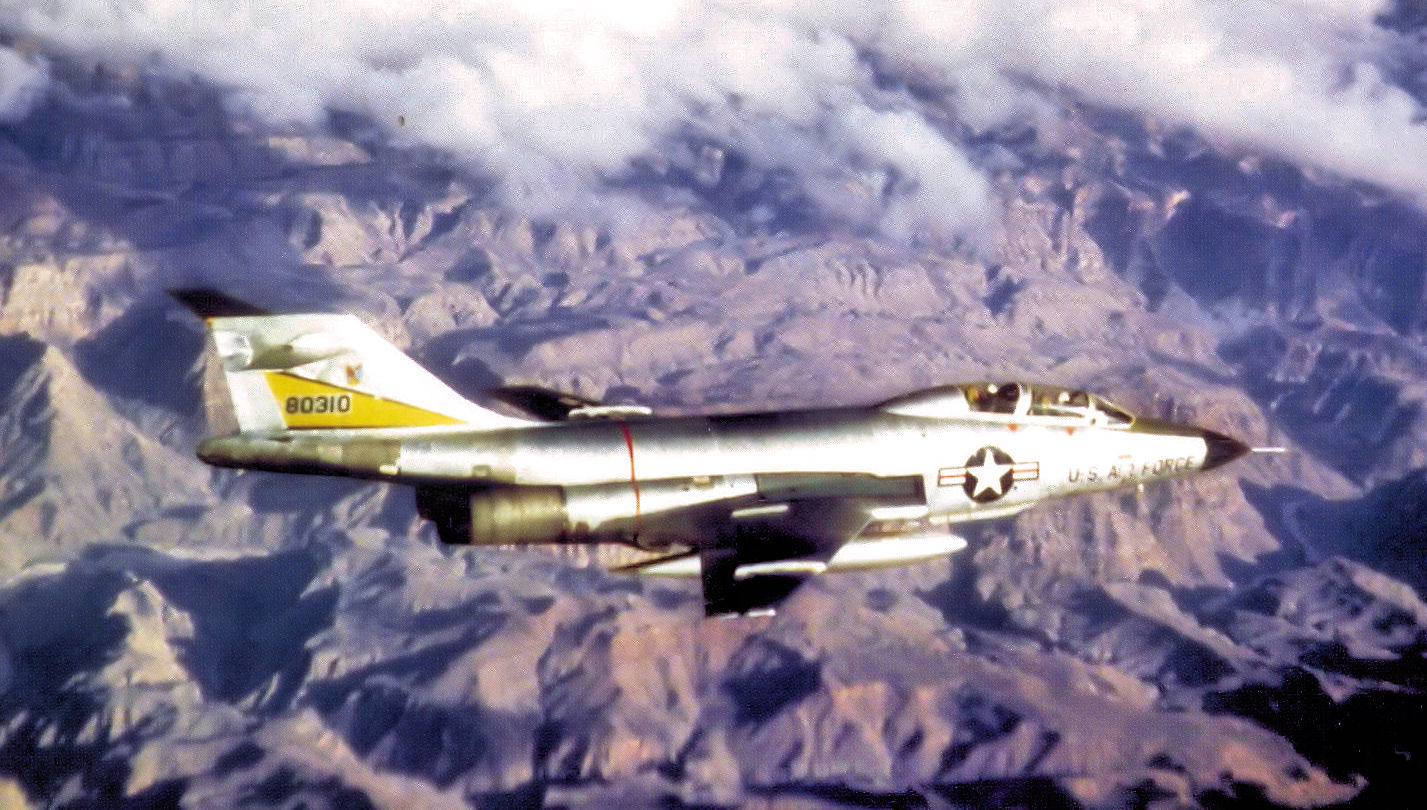
29th Fighter-Interceptor Squadron McDonnell F-101B-110-MC Voodoo Great Falls AFB, Montana March 1964

DC-20 was initially under the Great Falls Air Defense Sector (GFADS), established on 1 March 1959. GFADS was inactivated on 1 April 1966, and re designated as the 28th Air Division. DC-20 with its AN/FSQ-7 computer remained under the 28th AD until it was inactivated on 19 November 1969 and being taken over by the 24th Air Division. DC-20 remained on duty until March 1983 when technology advances allowed the air force to shut down many SAGE data centers.

The North American Aerospace Defense Command (NORAD) was created in 1957. Beginning in 1959, Malmstrom was the headquarters of the Great Falls Air Defense Sector, until inactivated in 1966. In 1978, Malmstrom AFB became responsible for the 24th NORAD region, which covered the western half of North America. This comprised four fighter/interceptor squadrons and radar sites stretching from the Rocky Mountains, halfway across North Dakota and north to the north border of Canada. The 24th also served as the NORAD alternate command post, which remained active until 1983, when it was inactivated and replaced by the Northwest Air Defense Sector.

On 1 July 1968, the F-101B equipped 29th FIS was inactivated and replaced by the F-106 Delta Dart equipped 71st Fighter-Interceptor Squadron, which was reassigned from Richards Gebaur AFB when its ADC mission was eliminated. Three years later, the 71st was redesignated as the 319th FIS, which remained on alert until 30 June 1972 when the active-duty air defense interceptor mission at Malmstrom was inactivated.

=== Strategic Air Command ===
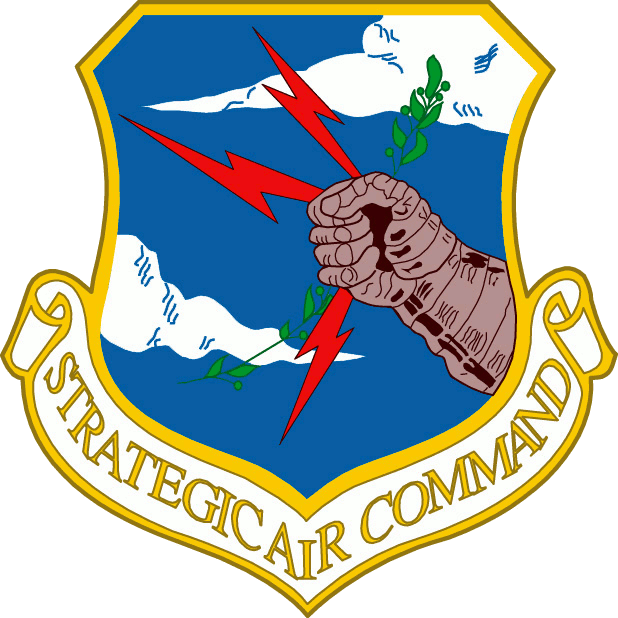

On 18 December 1953, Great Falls AFB was transferred from Military Air Transport Service to Strategic Air Command (SAC), although MATS units remained at the base for several years. SAC activated the 407th Strategic Fighter Wing at Great Falls with a mission to provide fighter escort for SAC's long-range B-36 Peacemaker The 407th SFW was assigned to Fifteenth Air Force, 39th Air Division and flew F-84 Thunderjets.

On 21 August 1954 the 407th SFW Vice Commander, Colonel Einar Axel Malmstrom, died when his T-33 Shooting Star trainer crashed approximately one mile west of the Great Falls Municipal Airport. Although his tenure was short, he was well liked by the local community. It was the local civilian community that led the efforts to rename Great Falls AFB for Col. Malmstrom. On 15 June 1956, the base was officially dedicated as Malmstrom Air Force Base.

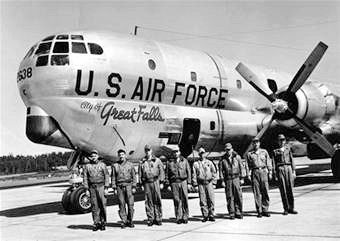
97th ARS Boeing KC-97G "City of Great Falls" (52-2638)

With the phaseout of the B-36 from the inventory in the late 1950s, the need for fighter escorts of SAC bombers was eliminated. The new B-52 Stratofortress and B-47 Stratojet bombers flew higher and faster than the F-84 escort fighters and instead of flying in formations, SAC's bombers flew individually to their selected targets. The 407th SFW was inactivated in 1957 and replaced by the 4061st Air Refueling Wing (ARW) was activated, initially equipped with the KB-29J, a Superfortress variant re-engineered to provide aerial refueling capabilities. The 407th Air Refueling Squadron (ARS) were joined by the 97th ARS and their KC-97 Stratofreighters to form the wing. The 4061st ARW flew their missions from Malmstrom AFB until July 1961.

==== 341st Strategic Missile Wing ====
With the development of the three-stage, solid-fuel Minuteman I missile in the late 1950s SAC began searching for sites to deploy this revolutionary weapon. Because Malmstrom's location placed most strategic targets in the Soviet Union within range of Minuteman, the base was selected to become a command and control center for ICBMs located in central Montana.

On 23 December 1959, the Air Force Ballistic Missile Committee approved the selection of Malmstrom AFB to host the first Minuteman ICBM base. A change of mission for the base occurred on 15 July 1961 when the 341st Strategic Missile Wing was reassigned to Malmstrom. The 341st was previously assigned to Dyess AFB, Texas, where it was designated as the 341st Bombardment Wing. With the reassignment of the 341st SMW to Malmstrom, the tankers of the 407th ARW were reassigned or retired and the runway at the base was used by the Air Defense Command F-101 and F-106 interceptors along with transient aircraft.

Construction of the wing's first launch facility began in March 1961 and was completed in December. The 10th Strategic Missile Squadron (SMS) was activated on 1 November 1961 and Alpha-01, the first launch control facility, was completed in July 1962. The first Minuteman I ICBM arrived on base by rail 23 July 1962. Just four days after the missile's arrival, Launch Facility Alpha-09 gained the title of the first Minuteman missile site. The 12th SMS and 490th SMS activated in March and May 1962.

On 3 July 1963, following 28 months of construction, the wing and its three squadrons became operational. Each squadron controlled 50 missiles, bringing the total wing strength to 150 Minuteman I missiles. Two years later, construction began on the fourth and final squadron, the 564th SMS. This squadron was equipped with the more modern Minuteman II missiles. On 5 May 1967, the 564th SMS was declared fully operational. Malmstrom's missile field was now the largest in the United States, covering 23,500 square miles (61,000 km^{2}). Two years later, the 10th, 12th and 490th SMSs were also upgraded to the Minuteman II missiles, increasing the wing's capabilities to four missile squadrons equipped with a total of 200 Minuteman II missiles.

In late 1962 missiles assigned to the 341st Wing would play a major role in the Cuban Missile Crisis. On 26 October, at 11:16 am, the 10th SMS's launch facility Alpha-06 went on "strategic alert" after it was discovered the Soviet Union had placed nuclear missiles in Cuba to counter the threat to Moscow and most of the Soviet Union east of the Urals posed by American nuclear-armed Jupiter and Thor missiles based in Turkey. Over the next four days the wing placed four more missiles on alert, with the last missile from Alpha Flight achieving alert status on 10 November. The Soviets eventually removed their missiles from Cuba.

In fact, the Minuteman missiles at Malmstrom were able to substitute for Jupiter and Thor missiles based in Turkey, which were removed under a secret accord, thus allowing the Soviets to remove their missiles from Cuba, and replace them with submarine-based missiles and longer-range ICBMs based on Soviet territory. The overall effect of the Cuban Missile Crisis was to greatly expand and extend the nuclear arms race, in which Malmstrom played (and continues to play) a leading role.

Throughout the Cold War era, the wing's missiles remained on alert and underwent extensive weapons systems upgrades. The 17th Defense Systems Evaluation Squadron, equipped with EB-57 Canberras, was activated in the 1970s to train NORAD air defense personnel in electronic countermeasures. In 1988 the hardened mobile launcher for the small ICBM was tested at Malmstrom AFB to verify its ability to operate in harsh winter conditions. A secret 1967 test of how a nuclear electromagnetic pulse would affect missiles reportedly resulted in what became known as the Malmstrom UFO incident.

==== 301st Air Refueling Wing ====
On 5 January 1988, Malmstrom gained its first SAC flying wing since the 4061st Air Refueling Wing had been inactivated in 1961. SAC's 301st Air Refueling Wing arrived from Rickenbacker AFB, Ohio and was responsible for the operation of KC-135R Stratotankers, refueling fighter, bomber, airlift, special operations and strategic reconnaissance aircraft worldwide.

A major restructuring occurred in 1989 when SAC relocated the 40th Air Division to Malmstrom AFB and assigned it host responsibilities for both the newly activated 301st ARW and the 341st Strategic Missile Wing.

The 301st ARW deployed to Moon Island in the Persian Gulf during Operation Desert Storm. During this time period the 301st flew 443 Combat Sorties refueling 936 coalition aircraft, and transferring 33.5 Million pounds of fuel. The 341st Strategic Missile Wing deployed security, civil engineering, services and support personnel in support of the action. On 14 June 1991, the 40th Air Division inactivated, returning host responsibilities back to the 341st SMW with the 301st ARW remaining as a tenant unit.

=== Post-Cold War era ===
The 40th Air Division was activated at Malmstrom on 7 July 1989. A third of the base's personnel (about 1,800 people) were assigned to it, including support personnel from the 341st Strategic Missile Wing. Historian, judge advocate, public affairs, and safety were now designated 40th Air Division, while combat support, resource management, security police, and strategic clinic were redesignated 840th.

On 1 September 1991, the 341 SMW became the 341st Missile Wing. Also in 1991, the Strategic Arms Reduction Treaty (START I), was officially formalized. President Bush took all Minuteman II missiles, bombers and tankers off alert status on 27 September. In November 1991, the 12th Missile Squadron's Launch Facility J-03 became the first to have its missile removed in compliance with the order. It would be three and one half years, until the last Minuteman II in the Air Force inventory was removed from Kilo-11 on 10 August 1995. As Minuteman II missiles were removed, a new program called Rivet Add was launched, modifying the 150 Minuteman II launch facilities to accommodate the newer Minuteman III, transferred from Grand Forks AFB in northeastern North Dakota.

With the inactivation of SAC on 1 June 1992, Malmstrom temporarily became an Air Mobility Command (AMC) base with the 341st Missile Wing as an Air Combat Command (ACC) tenant unit.

The 301 ARW was subsequently inactivated and replaced by the 43d Air Refueling Wing (43 ARW) as a KC-135R unit reporting to Fifteenth Air Force (15 AF), then located at March AFB, California. The 341 SMW was redesignated as the 341st Missile Wing (341 MW), reporting to ACC's Twentieth Air Force (20 AF) located at F.E. Warren Air Force Base at Cheyenne, Wyoming. Following an Air Force decision to divest ACC of all ICBM units and assets, the 341 MW was subsequently transferred to Air Force Space Command located at Peterson Air Force Base at Colorado Springs, Colorado. This mid-1993 move merged all missile and space operations under one command. In October 1997, the 341 MW, along with all other missile wings, was redesignated as the 341st Space Wing (341 SW).

In 1994, the 43 ARW was downgraded in status and redesignated as the 43d Air Refueling Group (43 ARG). In 1996, the 43 ARG and its KC-135R aircraft were transferred from Malmstrom to MacDill AFB at Tampa, Florida, as part of a Base Realignment and Closure (BRAC) action, merging with MacDill's 6th Air Base Wing to form the current 6th Air Refueling Wing. With the loss of its only fixed-wing flying unit, Malmstrom's runway was decommissioned as a cost-savings measure following departure of the last KC-135R aircraft in 1997. Malmstrom's air traffic control tower was leveled, the navigational aids were turned off and runway was closed and currently remains inactive. One hangar and a portion of the Malmstrom flight line remain operational for aviation purposes as heliport for Malmstrom's 40th Helicopter Squadron (40 HS) and its UH-1N Twin Huey helicopters supporting the 341st Space Wing's Minuteman III ICBM sites.

On 18 May 2007 there was an incident involving the visiting Canadian Forces aerial demonstration squadron, the "Snowbirds". While practicing, a lap belt failed in one of the Snowbirds' aircraft, resulting in a mishap that killed the pilot of Snowbird 2.

Malmstrom had been used for the site of an experimental coal to synthetic fuel plant for potential use in USAF aircraft in 2008.

On 6 May 2008, NBC Today Show personality Al Roker broadcast live from Malmstrom AFB as part of an "Access Granted" series centered on places the American public doesn't get to see firsthand. Roker and his crew were permitted access to a missile silo and he interviewed various squadron members about the policies and procedures should a nuclear response ever be directed by the President of the United States.

On 1 July 2008, the 341st Space Wing was redesignated as the 341st Missile Wing.

Two launch facilities at the base showed PCB levels higher than the thresholds recommended by the Environmental Protection Agency when extensive sampling began of active U.S. intercontinental ballistic missile bases to address specific cancer concerns in 2023.

=== 2014 cheating scandal ===
In 2014, dozens of missile launch officers lost their launch certifications after it was discovered that several officers were trading proficiency test answers amongst each other through text messages. An investigation began in 2013, when evidence of cheating was discovered during a drug investigation involving three launch officers. This resulted in over 90 nuclear launch officers being suspended from their duties and at least nine senior officers around the base were removed from command with a tenth resigning. Though some of the ten officers were not involved in the scandal, Deborah Lee James, the Secretary of the Air Force at the time, stated that they were removed for "not providing proper oversight amongst their crew force". Additional investigations were conducted at Minot Air Force Base and F. E. Warren Air Force Base to determine if the scandal had spread to other bases. No evidence of cheating was discovered at either base.

=== Major commands to which assigned ===
- Second Air Force, 6 July 1942
- AAF Air Service Command, 15 October 1943
- Air Transport Command, 1 January 1944
- Military Air Transport Service, 1 June 1948
- Air/Aerospace Defense Command

Major Tenant organizations 1 March 1951 – 31 December 1983

- Strategic Air Command, 1 February 1954 – 1 June 1992
- Air Mobility Command, 1 June 1992 – 1 July 1993
- Air Force Space Command, 1 July 1993 – 7 August 2009
- Air Force Global Strike Command, 9 August 2009–present

=== Major units assigned ===
- 352d Base HQ and Air Base Squadron*, 20 August 1942 – 4 May 1944
- 2d Bombardment Group, 27 November 1942 – 13 March 1943
- 385th Bombardment Group, 11 April – 7 June 1943
- 390th Bombardment Group, 6 June – 4 July 1943
- 401st Bombardment Group, 6 July – 10 October 1943
- 90th Ferrying Squadron, 15 April 1943 – 1 April 1945
- 1455th Army Air Force (later Air Force) Base Unit*, 1 August 1943 – 4 June 1948
- 517th Air Base Group*, 1 June 1948 – 1 May 1953
- 517th Air Transport Wing, 1 June 1948 – 1 May 1953
- 407th Strategic Fighter Wing, 18 December 1953 – 1 July 1957
- 582nd Air Resupply and Communications Wing, 1 May – 14 August 1953
- 1300th Air Base Wing*, 1 May 1953 – 1 February 1954
- 407th Air Base Group*, 1 February 1954 – 1 July 1957
- 91st Strategic Reconnaissance Squadron, 20 December 1954 – 17 July 1955
- 4061st Air Refueling Wing*, 1 July 1957 – 15 July 1961
- 341st Combat Support Group, 1960s–1989

Re-designated: 840th Combat Support Group, 7 July 1989

- 341st Strategic Missile Wing*, 15 July 1961 – 1 September 1991

Re-designated: 341st Missile Wing, 1 September 1991 – 1 October 1997
Re-designated:: 341st Space Wing, 1 October 1997 – 1 July 2008
Re-designated: 341st Missile Wing, 1 July 2008 – present

- 43d Air Refueling Wing / 43d Air Refueling Group, 1992 – 1 October 1996
- 24th ADCOM Region, 8 December 1978

Transferred to ADTAC as 24th NORAD Region, 1 October 1979 – 31 December 1983

- Great Falls Air Defense Sector, 1 March 1959

Re-designated: 28th Air Division, 1 April 1966 – 19 November 1969

- 29th Air Division, 1 March 1951 – 1 July 1961
- 545th Aircraft Control and Warning Group, 1 March 1951 – 6 February 1952
- 29th Fighter-Interceptor Squadron, 8 November 1953 – 18 July 1968 (F-94C, F-89H/J, F-101B)
- 319th Fighter-Interceptor Squadron, 1 July 1971 – 30 April 1972 (F-106)
- 679th Aircraft Control and Warning Squadron, 1 March 1951 – 6 February 1952
- 706th Radar Squadron (SAGE), 8 December 1957 – 1 July 1958
- 801st Radar Squadron (SAGE), 1 February 1956 – 31 December 1969; 30 June 1971 – 1 July 1974
- 4642d Air Defense Squadron (SAGE), 1 July 1972

Re-designated: 24th Air Defense Squadron (SAGE), 1 January 1975 – 31 December 1983

- 4677th Defense Systems Evaluation: 2 October 1972

Re-designated: 17th Defense Systems Evaluation Squadron, 1 July 1974 – 13 July 1979 (EB-57 Canberras)

references for base name, major commands, major units
* Base operating unit

== Role and operations ==
Malmstrom AFB is one of three US Air Force Bases that maintains and operates the Minuteman III intercontinental ballistic missile. The 341st Missile Wing reports directly to Twentieth Air Force at F.E. Warren Air Force Base, Wyoming. It is part of Global Strike Command headquartered at Barksdale Air Force Base, Louisiana.

The base's runway was closed on 31 December 1996 to aircraft operations. Helicopter operations at Malmstrom continue in support of the base's missile mission.

== Based units ==
Flying and notable non-flying units based at Malmstrom Air Force Base.

Units marked GSU are Geographically Separate Units, which although based at Malmstrom, are subordinate to a parent unit based at another location.

=== United States Air Force ===
Air Force Global Strike Command (AFGSC)

- Twentieth Air Force
  - 341st Missile Wing
    - 341st Missile Wing Staff Agencies
      - 341st Comptroller Squadron
      - 341st Missile Wing Public Affairs
      - 341st Missile Wing Staff Judge Advocate
      - 341st Missile Wing Equal Opportunity Office
      - 341st Missile Wing Inspector General
      - 341st Missile Wing Chaplain
      - 341st Missile Wing Sexual Assault Prevention & Response Office
      - 341st Missile Wing Safety
      - 341st Missile Wing Information Protection Office
    - 341st Operations Group
      - 10th Missile Squadron – LGM-30G Minuteman-III
      - 12th Missile Squadron – LGM-30G Minuteman-III
      - 490th Missile Squadron – LGM-30G Minuteman-III
      - 341st Operations Support Squadron
    - 341st Security Forces Group
      - 341st Missile Security Forces Squadron
      - 341st Security Forces Squadron
      - 341st Security Forces Support Squadron
      - 741st Missile Security Forces Squadron
      - 841st Missile Security Forces Squadron
      - 341st Missile Security Operations Squadron
    - 341st Mission Support Group
      - 341st Civil Engineer Squadron
      - 341st Communications Squadron
      - 341st Contracting Squadron
      - 341st Force Support Squadron
      - 341st Logistics Readiness Squadron
    - 341st Maintenance Group
      - 341st Missile Maintenance Squadron
      - 341st Munitions Squadron
      - 741st Maintenance Squadron
    - 341st Medical Group
  - 582nd Helicopter Group
    - 40th Helicopter Squadron (GSU) – UH-1N Iroquois

Air Combat Command (ACC)

- Fifteenth Air Force
  - 800th RED HORSE Group
    - 819th RED HORSE Squadron (GSU)

Air National Guard (ANG)

- 120th Airlift Wing
  - 219th RED HORSE Squadron (GSU)

Air Force Office of Special Investigations (AFOSI)

- Det 806

=== United States Army ===
US Army Reserve (USAR)

- 899th Supply Company
  - Detachment 1
  - 2nd Platoon
  - Support Operations Section

=== Malmstrom Museum ===
The Malmstrom Museum exhibits 7 aircraft as well as artifacts related to the history of the airbase.

== Geography ==
According to the United States Census Bureau, the base CDP has a total area of 5.2 square miles (13 km^{2}), all land.

== Demographics ==
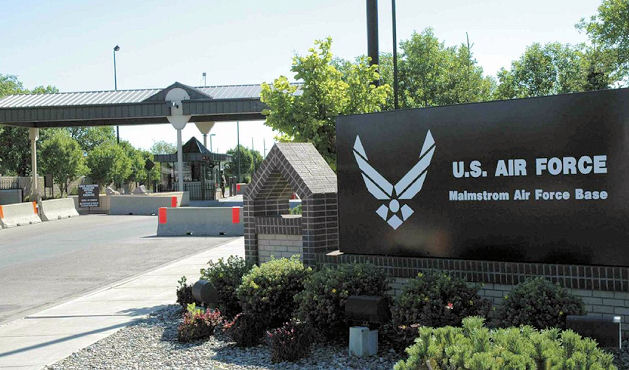
Main gate

Malmstrom is part of the "Great Falls, Montana Metropolitan Statistical Area".

As of the 2000 census, there were 4,544 people, 1,310 households, and 1,151 families residing on the base. Of the 1,310 households 66.6% had children under the age of 18 living with them, 82.0% were married couples living together, 4.0% had a female householder with no husband present, 12.1% were non-families, and 10.7% of all households were made up of individuals. The average household size was 3.16 and the average family size was 3.41.

The population density was 879.9 inhabitants per square mile (340.0/km^{2}). There were 1,405 housing units at an average density of 272.1 per square mile (105.1/km^{2}). The racial makeup of the base is 83.2% European American, 6.6% African American, 0.6% Native American, 2.3% Asian, 0.2% Pacific Islander, 3.3% from other races, and 3.9% from two or more races. Hispanic or Latino people of any race were 7.8% of the population.

On base population ages were 36.8% under 18, 23.2% from 18 to 24, 38.1% from 25 to 44, 1.8% from 45 to 64, and 0.2% 65 or older. The median age was 22 years. For every 100 females, there were 118.4 males. For every 100 females age 18 and over, there were 125.3 males.

The median income for a household on the base was $31,775, and the median income for a family was $33,125. Males had a median income of $24,009 versus $19,393 for females. The per capita income for the base was $11,450. About 4.9% of families and 6.2% of the population were below the poverty line, including 6.0% of those under the age of 18 and none of those 65 and older.

== See also ==
- Air Transport Command
- List of military installations in Montana
- Montana World War II Army Airfields
- United States general surveillance radar stations
