= AN/FPS-6 Radar =

Cold War-era American height finding radar

AN/FPS-6
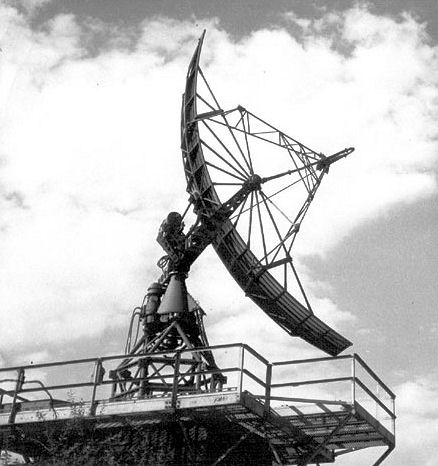
- General Electric AN/FPS-6 Radar
- Country of origin: United States
- Type: Long-Range Height Finder Radar
- Other names: AN/MPS-14 (Mobile version)

The AN/FPS-6 Radar was a long-range height finding radar used by the United States Air Force's Air Defense Command. The AN/FPS-6 radar was introduced into service in the late 1950s and served as the principal height-finder radar for the United States for several decades thereafter. It was also used by the Royal Air Force alongside their AMES Type 80s. Built by General Electric, the S-band radar operated on a frequency of 2700 to 2900 MHz. Between 1953 and 1960, about 450 units of the AN/FPS-6 and the mobile AN/MPS-14 version were produced. The AN/FPS-90 and AN/FPS-116 radars were identical to the AN/FPS-6 except for receiver modifications.

In accordance with the Joint Electronics Type Designation System (JETDS), the "AN/FPS-6" designation represents the 6th design of an Army-Navy electronic device for fixed ground search radar. The JETDS system also now is used to name all Department of Defense electronic systems.

== Operation ==
The radar consisted of an antenna group, a transmitter group, a receiver group, and an ancillary group. Most fixed sites had a remote group, which allowed the control of the radar from inside the operations center. Also located in operations, was the anti-jam receivers. These receivers were fed with raw video from the tower receiver, and output several types of processed video to enable operators to see through jamming.

The ancillary group originally consisted of an AN/OA-270 Range Height Indicator (RHI), and then later upgraded to an AN/OA-929 RHI, which displayed the raw or anti-jam video, and allowed the operator to position the azimuth of the antenna. At SAGE sites, the antenna azimuth was selected by command from the Air Division, and the operator could slew the antenna plus or minus ten degrees for fine adjustment.

The AN/FPS-90 radar was designated a high-power model, using a QK-338A magnetron and rated at 4.5 MW peak power, versus the QK-327A magnetron at 3.5 MW peak power. The receiver mixer was also modified to handle the larger signal dynamic range. Due to maintenance costs and high failure rates, these radars were all retrofitted to the same magnetron as the AN/FPS-6 by the late 1960s, and were no longer high power. The radar maintained its AN/FPS-90 designation due to the receiver modifications. Everything else was identical.

== See also ==
- List of radars
- List of military electronics of the United States
