= 114th Fighter Squadron =

114th Fighter Squadron

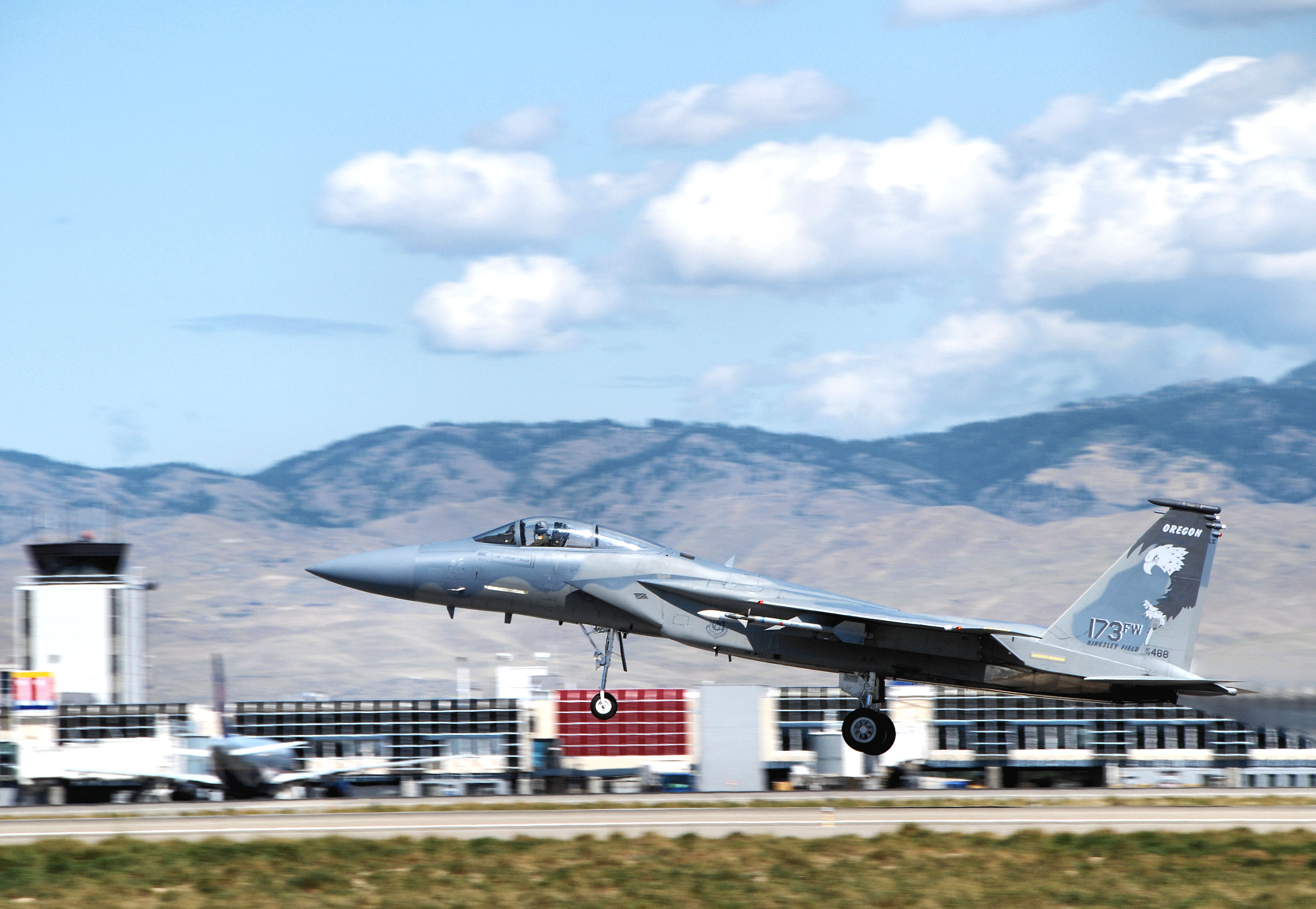
- 114th Fighter Squadron F-15C Eagle (Note: Aircraft is McDonnell Douglas F-15C-21-MC Eagle, serial 78-0488. This plane was sent to the Aerospace Maintenance and Regeneration Center on 26 June 2010. Baugher, Joe (16 April 2023). "1978 USAF Serial Numbers". Joe Baugher.)
- Active: 1942–1945; 1946–1952; 1952–1958; 1984–present
- Country: United States
- Allegiance: Oregon
- Branch: Air National Guard
- Role: ANG interceptor training
- Part of: Oregon Air National Guard
- Garrison/HQ: Kingsley Field Air National Guard Base, Klamath Falls, Oregon
- Nickname: Eager Beavers
- Motto: The Land of No Slack
- Engagements: European Theater of Operations; Pacific Ocean Theater of World War II
- Decorations: Distinguished Unit Citation; Air Force Outstanding Unit Award; French Croix de Guerre with Palm

Insignia
- 114th Fighter Squadron emblem

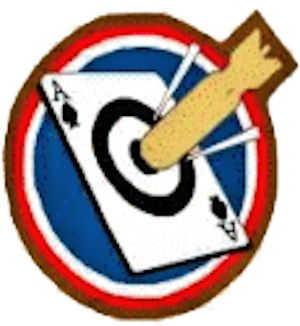
- 439th Bombardment Squadron emblem

The 114th Fighter Squadron is a unit of the Oregon Air National Guard 173d Fighter Wing located at Kingsley Field Air National Guard Base, Klamath Falls, Oregon. The 114th was equipped with the McDonnell Douglas F-15C Eagle until December 2025. In 2026, the squadron is scheduled to receive its first Lockheed Martin F-35 Lightning II.

The first predecessor of the squadron was activated in June 1942 as the 439th Bombardment Squadron and equipped with the Martin B-26 Marauder. After training in the United States, it deployed to the Mediterranean Theater of Operations, where its actions in combat earned it two Distinguished Unit Citation and a French Croix de Guerre with Palm. In late 1944, it was withdrawn from combat operations and returned to the United States, where it converted to the Douglas A-26 Invader. It moved to Okinawa, where it engaged in combat against Japan. Following V-J Day, the squadron returned to the United States and was inactivated.

In 1946, the squadron was allotted to the National Guard and redesignated the 114th Bombardment Squadron. It activated in New York and was again equipped with the Invader, which was called the B-26 after 1948. In 1951, the squadron was called to active duty for the Korean War. It did not depart the United States, however, leaving its B-26s behind to become a training unit for Boeing B-29 Superfortress aircrews. In December 1952, it was relieved from active duty. It turned its B-29s over to a regular unit and returned to its B-26 Invaders in New York. In 1957, it assumed an air defense mission as the 114th Fighter-Interceptor Squadron, but its interceptor aircraft were soon withdrawn and it remained a paper unit until inactivating in September 1958 and being withdrawn from the New York National Guard.

The squadron's second predecessor was formed in the Oregon Air National Guard in February 1984 as the 114th Tactical Fighter Training Squadron, taking over the resources of the 8123rd Fighter-Interceptor Training Squadron, which had been organized the previous year to train Air National Guard McDonnell Douglas F-4C Phantom II crews in the air defense mission. In August 1987, the two squadrons were consolidated into a single unit. It has continued the interceptor mission since, twice trading in its fighters for newer models.

== Mission ==
The 114th Fighter Squadron trains Air National Guard aircrews in the air defense mission with Lockheed Martin F-35A Lighting II aircraft. It also trains medical personnel on the special medical issues associated with highly maneuverable fighter aircraft.

== History ==
=== World War II ===
==== Organization and preparation for combat ====
The squadron was first activated on 26 June 1942 at Barksdale Field, Louisiana, as the 439th Bombardment Squadron, one of the four original squadrons of the 319th Bombardment Group. a Martin B-26 Marauder medium bombardment group. The squadron trained for combat at Barksdale and Harding Field, in Louisiana. The air echelon began ferrying its aircraft to England via the North Atlantic route on 27 August 1942, with the squadron officially moving to RAF Shipdham on 12 September 1942. By late October to early November, (Note: The 319th Group suffered several losses on the ferry flight, as winter weather began to impact the northern ferry route. Other planes were delayed for weather or aircraft malfunctions. As a result, further deployments of B-26 units to Europe travelled over the South Atlantic route, Freeman, pp. 15, 55.) squadron aircraft were in place at RAF Horsham St Faith. The ground echelon sailed on the RMS Queen Mary on 5 September.

==== Mediterranean Theater of Operations ====
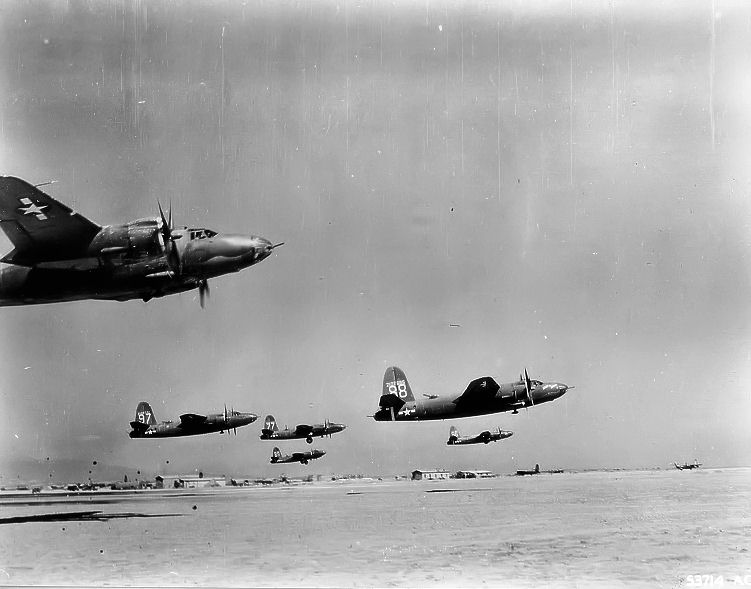
Formation of 319th Bombardment Group B-26 Marauders taking off

The air echelon of the squadron departed England on 12 November 1942 for Saint-Leu Airfield, Algeria. Although this was supposed to be a simple repositioning flight, it became the squadron's introduction to combat when the 319th Group formation strayed from its planned route and flew over occupied France, where they were attacked by German aircraft. Some of the ground echelon had made the amphibious landing at Arzeu beach on 8 November. However, it was not until the following March that all aircraft had made the move to North Africa.

The squadron began combat quickly, flying its first sorties during November. Until March 1943, it made strikes at enemy targets in Tunisia, including railroads, airfields, and harbor installations. It struck enemy shipping in the Mediterranean Sea to block reinforcements and supplies from reaching opposing Axis forces.

In March 1943, the squadron was withdrawn from combat and moved to Oujda Airfield, French Morocco for a period of reorganization and training. On 1 June, it moved forward to Sedrata Airfield, Algeria and resumed combat operations. It participated in Operation Corkscrew, the reduction of Pantelleria, that month. The following month it provided air support for Operation Husky, the invasion of Sicily. After Sicily fell, it directed most of its attacks on targets in Italy. It supported Operation Avalanche, the invasion of Italy, in September. These operations concentrated on airfields, marshalling yards airfields, viaducts, gun sites and other defense positions. In November, it moved from Africa to Decimomannu Airfield, Sardinia to shorten the range to targets in central Italy.

From January to March 1944, the squadron supported Allied ground forces as they advanced in the Battle of Monte Cassino and Operation Shingle, the landings at Anzio. As ground forces approached Rome, it flew interdiction missions. On 3 March 1944, the squadron earned a Distinguished Unit Citation (DUC) for an attack on rail facilities in Rome, while carefully avoiding damage to religious and cultural monuments. Eight days later, it earned a second DUC for an attack on marshalling yards in Florence, disrupting communications between Florence and Rome. Its support of French forces between April and June earned the squadron the French Croix de Guerre with Palm.

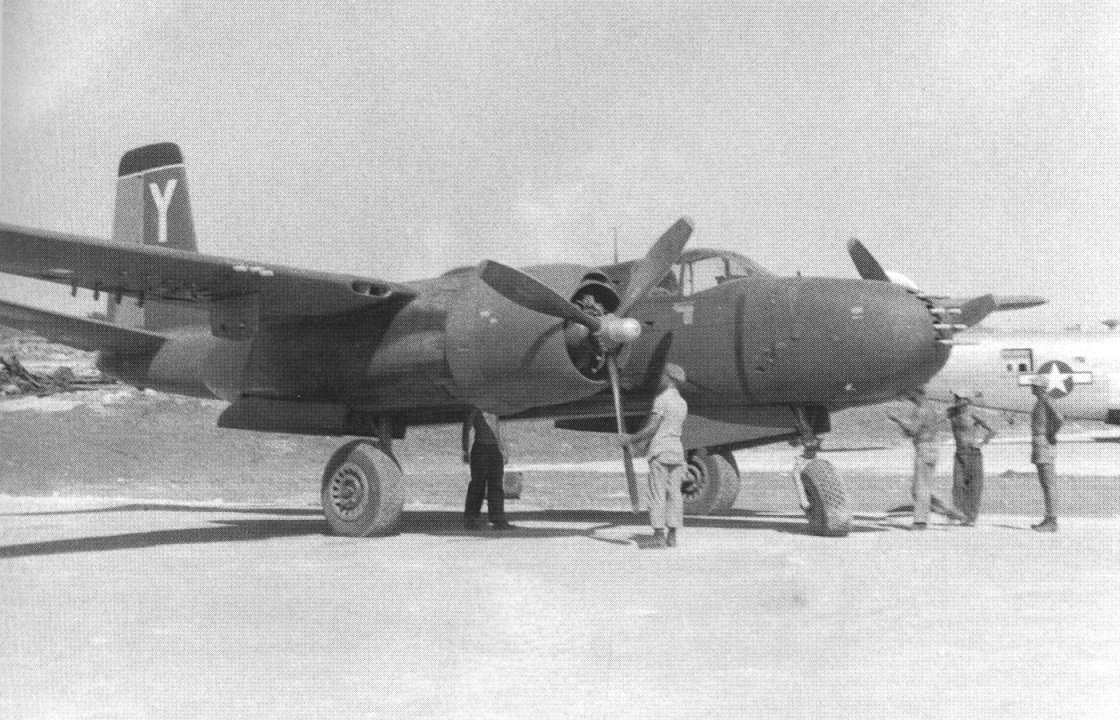
A-26 at Machinato Airfield in 1945

In August and September 1944, the squadron supported Operation Dragoon, the invasion of southern France, moving forward to Serragia Airfield, Corsica the following month. It attacked German supply lines in northern Italy, including bombing bridges over the Po River. It also attacked some targets in Yugoslavia. It continued combat operations while transitioning into the North American B-25 Mitchell from its Marauders. At the end of the year, the squadron was withdrawn from combat and returned to the United States in January 1945 to begin training with the Douglas A-26 Invader in preparation for deployment to the Western Pacific.

==== Combat in the Pacific ====
The squadron completed its training in the new bomber and departed to reenter combat in April 1945. It arrived on Okinawa in early July and was established at Machinato Airfield later that month. It flew its first mission in the Pacific on 16 July 1945. It flew missions in China and Japan, attacking airfields, shipping, marshalling yards, industrial centers and other targets until V-J Day. It was briefly assigned to VII Bomber Command when the 319th departed Okinawa on 21 November 1945. The squadron left in December, and was inactivated at the Port of Embarkation on 6 January 1946.

=== New York Air National Guard ===
The squadron was allotted to the National Guard on 24 May 1946 and redesignated the 114th Bombardment Squadron, Light. It was organized on 1 March 1947 at Floyd Bennett Field, New York, and received federal recognition on 17 June 1947. The squadron was once again equipped with A-26 Invader light bombers and was assigned to the 106th Bombardment Group. On 1 March 1951, the squadron was called to active duty as a result of the Korean War. The squadron moved to March Air Force Base, California without its aircraft. At March, it began training with Boeing B-29 Superfortress medium bombers.

Strategic Air Command (SAC)’s mobilization for the Korean War had highlighted that SAC wing commanders focused too much on running the base organization and not spending enough time on overseeing actual combat preparations. Under an organization implemented in February 1951 and finalized in June 1952, the wing commander focused primarily on the combat units and the maintenance necessary to support combat aircraft by having the combat and maintenance squadrons report directly to the wing and eliminating the intermediate group structures. On arrival at March, the squadron was attached to the 106th Bombardment Wing and on 16 June 1952, the 106th Group was inactivated and the squadron assigned directly to the wing. At March, the squadron concentrated on training of reservists to backfill rotating B-29 combat crews serving on Okinawa and Japan. The squadron was inactivated and returned to New York state control on 1 December 1952 and its mission, personnel and equipment were transferred to the 442nd Bombardment Squadron, which was simultaneously activated.

Upon return to Floyd Bennett Field, the 114th again was equipped with B-26 Invaders and resumed training with its light bombers and flew them until its conversion to an air defense fighter unit as the 114th Fighter-Interceptor Squadron in June 1957. It received four Lockheed F-94B Starfires armed with 20mm cannon in the nose and FFAR rockets in its wing tip tanks that summer, but transferred them to the 102d Fighter-Interceptor Squadron in December. The 114th was inactivated on 14 September 1958 after being dormant for several months. In August 1987, the squadron was consolidated with the 114th Tactical Fighter Training Squadron. (Note: The squadron's inactivation was announced in September 1957 as part of the reduction of the 106th Wing to group size, but was protested as contrary to law requiring the consent of the governor to certain changes to a National Guard unit's mission if the unit is located entirely within that governor's state. Brock, Maj Gen R.C. (1957). "Annual Report of the Chief of Staff to the Governorfor the Year 1957" (PDF). State of New York Division of Military and Naval Affairs. p. 9.)

=== Oregon Air National Guard ===
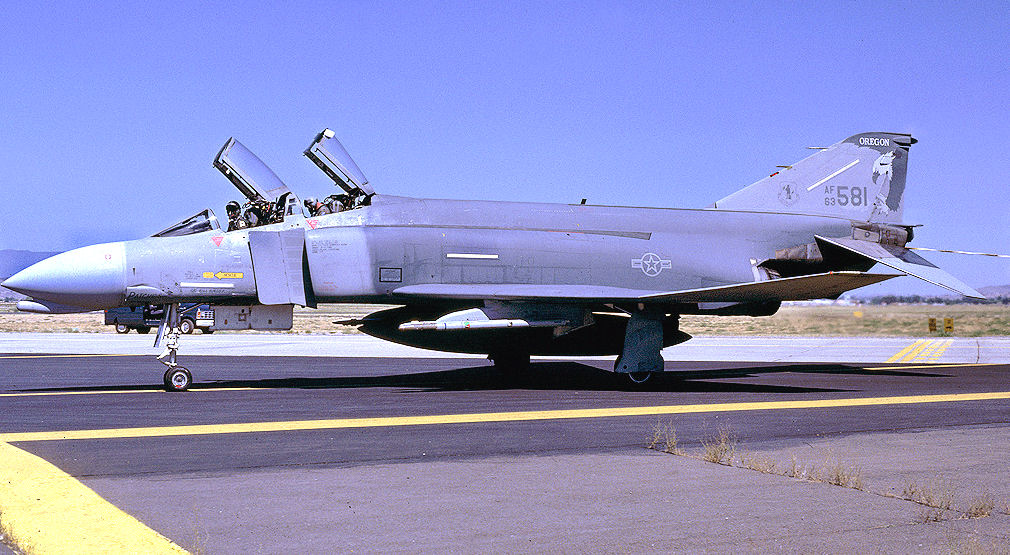
114th Tactical Fighter Training Squadron F-4C Phantom II, about 1985 (Note: Aircraft is McDonnell Douglas F-4C-19-MC Phantom II, serial 63-7581. Nicknamed Patches. Sent to the Aerospace Maintenance and Regeneration Center on 19 September 1989 and scrapped on 3 February 2016. Baugher, Joe (3 September 2023). "1963 USAF Serial Numbers". Joe Baugher.)

In 1982, the Air Force decided to establish an air defense "schoolhouse" for McDonnell Douglas F-4 Phantom pilots at Kingsley Field, which would be managed by the Oregon Air National Guard. The Oregon Guard activated the 8123rd Fighter Interceptor Training Squadron on 1 January 1983 and assigned it to the 142nd Fighter Group, which was located at Portland International Airport. The squadron began the first class during February 1983. On 1 February 1984, this mission expanded to training pilots and Weapons Systems Officers for all Air National Guard air defense squadrons. The 8123rd was inactivated and its personnel and equipment were transferred to the new 114 Tactical Fighter Training Squadron. In August 1987, the 114th Fighter-Interceptor Squadron was consolidated with the 114th Tactical Fighter Training Squadron.

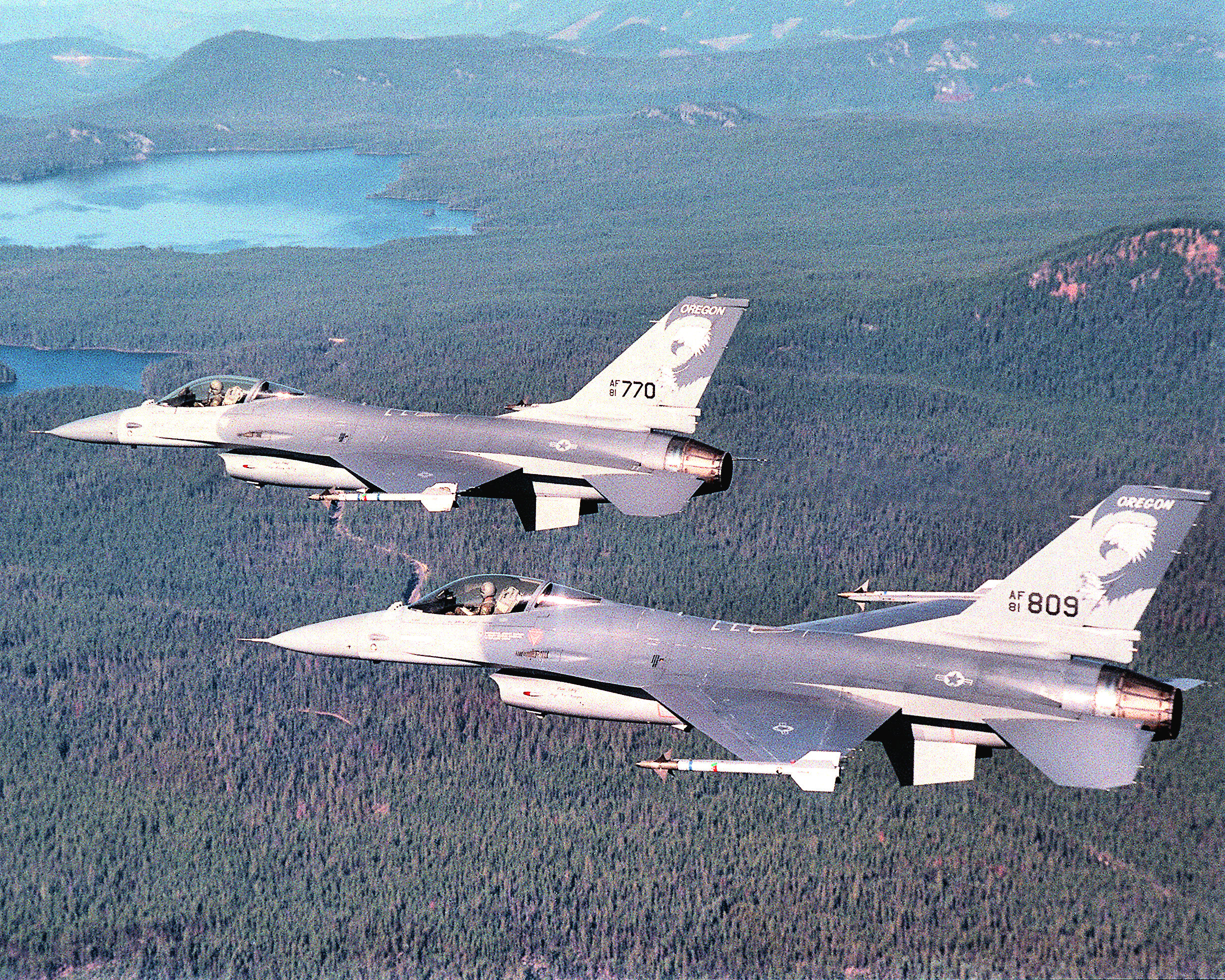
114th Fighter Squadron Block 15 ADF F-16A formation about 1990.

The Air Force decided in 1987 to add the General Dynamics F-16A Fighting Falcon to the nation's air defense arsenal. Kingsley field was selected to receive the first of 270 F-16s to be modified for air defense role. 18 of the newly designated F-16A/B block 15 Air Defense Fighter were assigned to Kingsley to replace the F-4C, which was being phased out of the air defense inventory. The first F-16 aircraft arrived at Kingsley Field in August 1988 and in mid-November 1988, the last F-4 class graduated. The first Air Defense Fighter modified F-16 aircraft arrived 1 March 1989, and the first class on 13 July 1989.

The squadron added a new medical training program to its curriculum in January 1990, with the F-16 Flight Surgeon Training Course (also known as "Top Knife") being the first of its kind in the nation. "Top Eye" for optometrists joined the program in January 1994, followed by "Top Drill" for dentists in April 1994. The courses help orient military doctors to the rigors of high performance flight.

In 1995, National Guard units were reorganized into the Objective Wing organization, which had been implemented in the regular air force starting in 1991. As a result, the 142nd Group became a wing and the squadron was transferred to the wing's new 142nd Operations Group. On 1 April 1996, the 173d Fighter Wing was formed at Kingsley as a host organization and parent unit for the 114th Fighter Squadron when the unit was authorized to expand, with the 114th being transferred from the 142d Fighter Wing at Portland to the new Wing at Kingsley.

The F-16As were retired in the late 1990s as their service life was ending. The squadron began receiving McDonnell Douglas F-15 Eagles in 1998. Was upgraded to the F-15C/D Eagle in 2004, continuing its mission as an ANG interceptor training unit.

In December 2025, the squadron's final two F-15's departed Kingsley Field. For the next 6 months, the squadron and airbase will begin its transition to accommodate the 5th generation F-35 Lightning II.

== Lineage ==
114th Fighter-Interceptor Squadron

- Constituted as the 439th Bombardment Squadron (Medium) on 19 June 1942

Activated on 26 June 1942
Redesignated 439th Bombardment Squadron, Medium 1944
Redesignated 439th Bombardment Squadron, Light on 3 February 1945
Inactivated on 13 December 1945

- Redesignated 114th Bombardment Squadron, Light and allotted to National Guard on 24 May 1946

Organized on 1 March 1947
Extended federal recognition on 17 June 1947
Federalized and placed on active duty on 1 March 1951
Redesignated 114th Bombardment Squadron, Medium on 1 April 1951
Inactivated, released from active duty, returned to New York state control and redesignated 114th Bombardment Squadron, Light on 1 December 1952

- Activated on 1 December 1952

Redesignated 114th Bombardment Squadron, Tactical in 1955
Redesignated: 114th Fighter-Interceptor Squadron on 15 June 1957
Inactivated on 14 September 1958 and withdrawn from Air National Guard
Consolidated with the 114th Tactical Fighter Training Squadron on 17 August 1987

114th Fighter Squadron
Constituted as the 114th Tactical Fighter Training Squadron and allotted to the Oregon Air National Guard in 1983
Activated and extended federal recognition on 1 February 1984
Consolidated with the 114th Fighter-Interceptor Squadron on 17 August 1987
Redesignated 114th Fighter Squadron on 15 March 1992

=== Assignments ===
- 319th Bombardment Group, 26 June 1942
- VII Bomber Command, 18 December 1945 – 4 January 1946
- New York National Guard, 1 March 1947
- 106th Bombardment Group, 21 March 1947 (attached to 106th Bombardment Wing after c. 28 March 1951)
- 106th Bombardment Wing, 16 June 1952 – 1 November 1952
- 106th Bombardment Group (later 106th Fighter Group), 1 November 1952 – 14 September 1958
- 142d Fighter Group (later 142d Fighter-Interceptor Group, 142d Fighter Group), 1 February 1984
- 142d Operations Group, 11 October 1995
- 173d Operations Group, 1 April 1996

=== Stations ===
- Barksdale Field, Louisiana, 26 June 1942
- Harding Field, Louisiana, 8–27 August 1942
- RAF Shipdham (Station 115), England, 12 September 1942
- RAF Horsham St Faith (Station 123), England, c. 4 October 1942 – 22 Oct 1942
- Saint-Leu Airfield, Algeria, 10 November 1942
- Oran Tafaraoui Airport, Algeria, c. 18 November 1942
- Maison Blanche Airport, Algeria, c. 24 November 1942
- Telergma Airfield, Algeria, 14 December 1942
- Oujda Airfield, French Morocco, 3 March 1943
- Rabat-Salé Airport, French Morocco, 25 April 1943
- Sedrata Airfield, Algeria, 1 June 1943
- Djedeida Airfield, Tunisia, 26 June 1943
- Decimomannu Airfield, Sardinia, Italy, 1 November 1943
- Serragia Airfield, Corsica, France, c. 21 September 1944 – . 9 January 1945
- Bradley Field, Connecticut, 25 January 1945
- Columbia Army Air Base, South Carolina, c. 28 February–28 April 1945
- Kadena Airfield, Okinawa, Japan, 2 July 1945
- Machinato Airfield, Okinawa. Japan, 21 July – 21 November 1945
- Fort Lawton, Washington, 4 January 1946
- Floyd Bennett Field, New York, New York, 1 March 1947
- March Air Force Base, California, c. 1 May 1951 – 1 December 1951
- Floyd Bennett Field, New York, 1 December 1951 – 30 September 1958
- Klamath Falls Airport (later Kingsley Field Air National Guard Base), Oregon, 1 October 1983 – present

=== Aircraft ===
- Martin B-26 Marauder, 1942–1944
- North American B-25 Mitchell, 1944–1945
- Douglas A-26 (after 1948, B-26) Invader, 1945–1946, 1947–1951; 1952–1956
- Boeing B-29 Superfortress, 1951–1952
- Lockheed F-94B Starfire, 1956–1957
- McDonnell Douglas F-4C Phantom II, 1983–1988
- General Dynamics F-16A/B Fighting Falcon, 1988–1998
- McDonnell Douglas F-15A/B Eagle, 1998–2004
- McDonnell Douglas F-15C/D Eagle, 2004 – 2025
- Lockheed Martin F-35A Lightning II, 2026 –

=== Awards and campaigns ===
Award streamer	Award	Dates	Notes
	Distinguished Unit Citation	3 March 1944	Rome, Italy, 439th Bombardment Squadron
	Distinguished Unit Citation	11 March 1944	Florence, Italy, 439th Bombardment Squadron
	Air Force Outstanding Unit Award	1 January 1984-31 December 1986	114th Tactical Fighter Training Squadron
	Air Force Outstanding Unit Award	1 July 1989-20 June 1991	114th Tactical Fighter Training Squadron
	Air Force Outstanding Unit Award	1 October 2006–30 September 2008	114th Fighter Squadron
	French Croix de Guerre with Palm	April, May and June 1944	439th Bombardment Squadron

Campaign Streamer	Campaign	Dates	Notes
	Air Combat, EAME Theater	12 September 1942 – 8 January 1945	439th Bombardment Squadron
	Algeria-French Morocco (with Arrowhead)	10 November 1942 – 11 November 1942	439th Bombardment Squadron
	Tunisia	12 November 1942 – 13 May 1943	439th Bombardment Squadron
	Sicily	14 May 1943 – 17 August 1943	439th Bombardment Squadron
	Naples-Foggia	18 August 1943 – 21 January 1944	439th Bombardment Squadron
	Anzio	22 January 1944 – 24 May 1944	439th Bombardment Squadron
	Rome-Arno	22 January 1944 – 9 September 1944	439th Bombardment Squadron
	Southern France	15 August 1944 – 14 September 1944	439th Bombardment Squadron
	North Apennines	10 September 1944 – 8 January 1945	439th Bombardment Squadron
	Air Offensive, Japan	2 July 1945 – 2 September 1945	439th Bombardment Squadron
	Ryukus	2 July 1945	439th Bombardment Squadron
	China Offensive	2 Jul 1945–2 September 1945	439th Bombardment Squadron

== See also ==
- List of Martin B-26 Marauder operators
- List of A-26 Invader operators
- List of B-29 Superfortress operators
- F-94 Starfire units of the United States Air Force
- List of F-4 Phantom II operators
- List of F-15 operators
- General Dynamics F-16 Fighting Falcon operators
