= List of McDonnell Douglas F-15 Eagle operators =

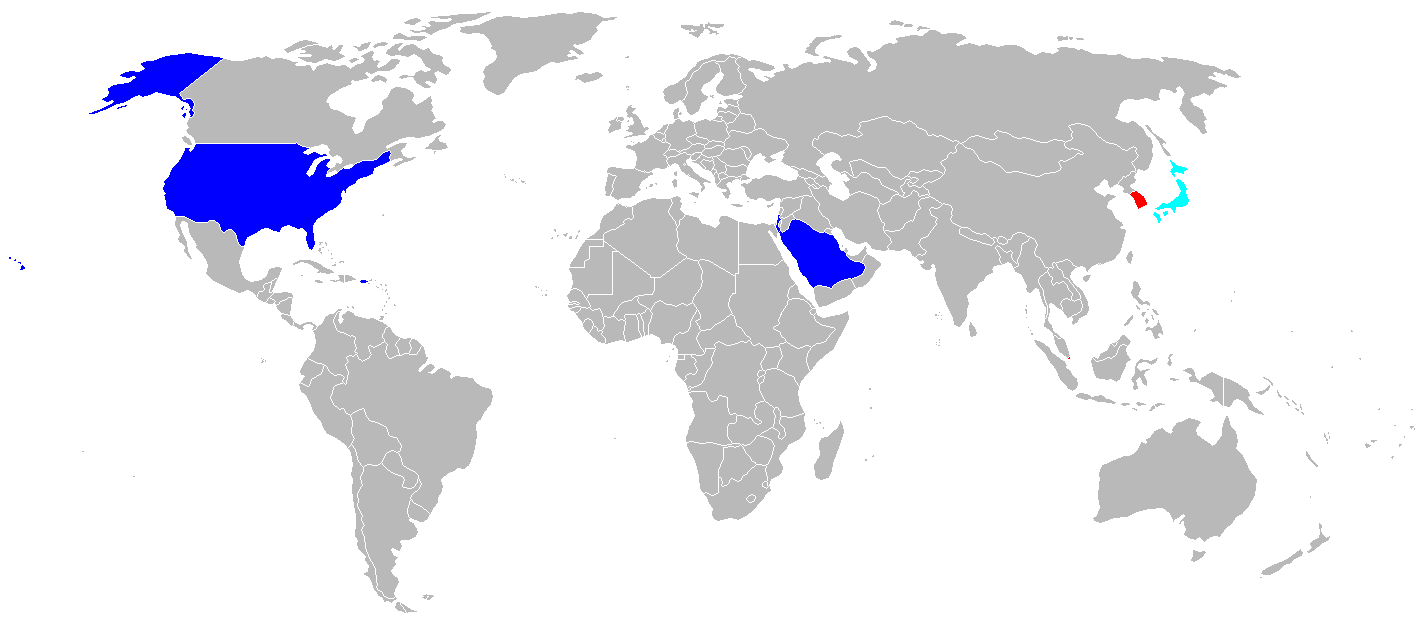
Current operators of the F-15 in cyan, F-15E in red, both in dark blue

The McDonnell Douglas F-15 Eagle has been in service with the United States Air Force since 1976. Israel, Japan, Saudi Arabia and other nations also operate the aircraft. The units it has been assigned to, and the bases it has been stationed are listed below.

== Operators ==
=== Israel ===
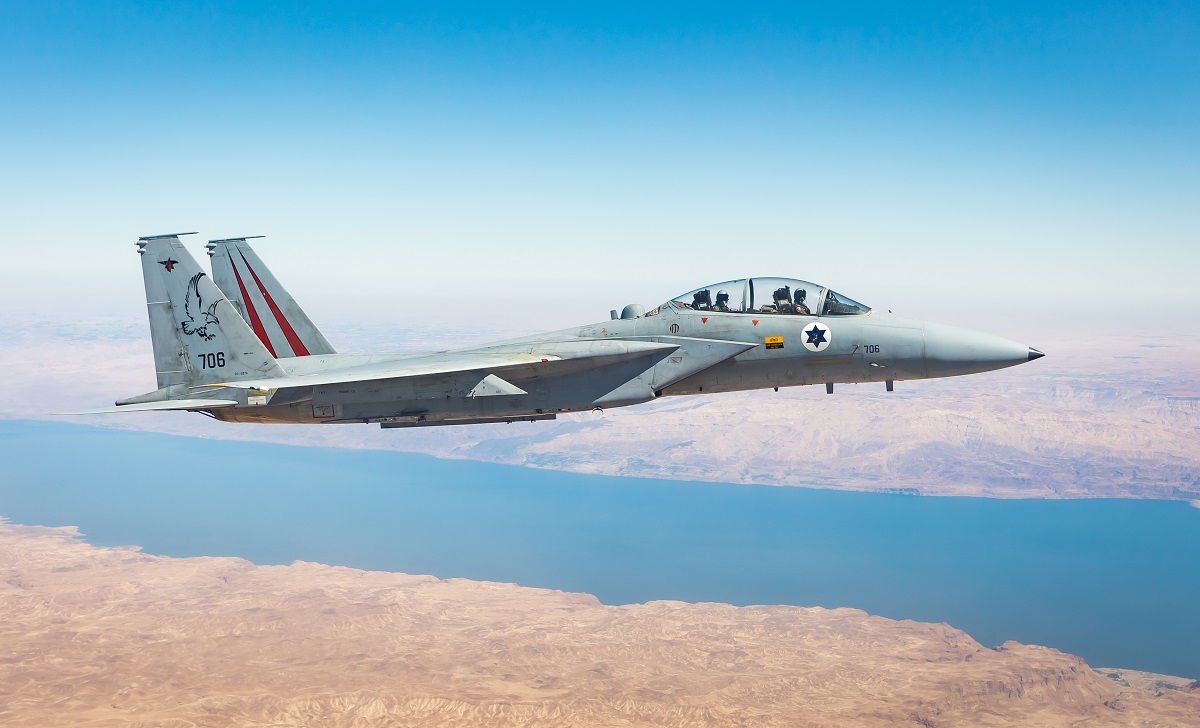
Israeli F-15 "Baz"

- The Israeli Air Force has operated F-15s since 1977, received under Peace Fox I, II and III. These aircraft are currently organized into two F-15A/B/C/D squadrons and one F-15I squadron. The first 25 F-15A/Bs were early USAF production airframes. The second batch was temporarily embargoed as a result of the 1982 Lebanon War. The IAF has 43 F-15A/B/C/D (20 F-15A, 6 F-15B, 11 F-15C, and 6 F-15D) aircraft in service as of January 2011. It also operates 25 F-15I "Ra'am" aircraft as of January 2011.
  - 106 Squadron ("The Head of the Spear Squadron") Tel Nof Airbase (F-15A/B/C/D)
  - 133 Squadron ("The Twin-Tail Knights Squadron") Tel Nof Airbase (F-15A/B/C/D)
  - 69 Squadron – Hatzerim AFB (F-15I)

=== Japan ===
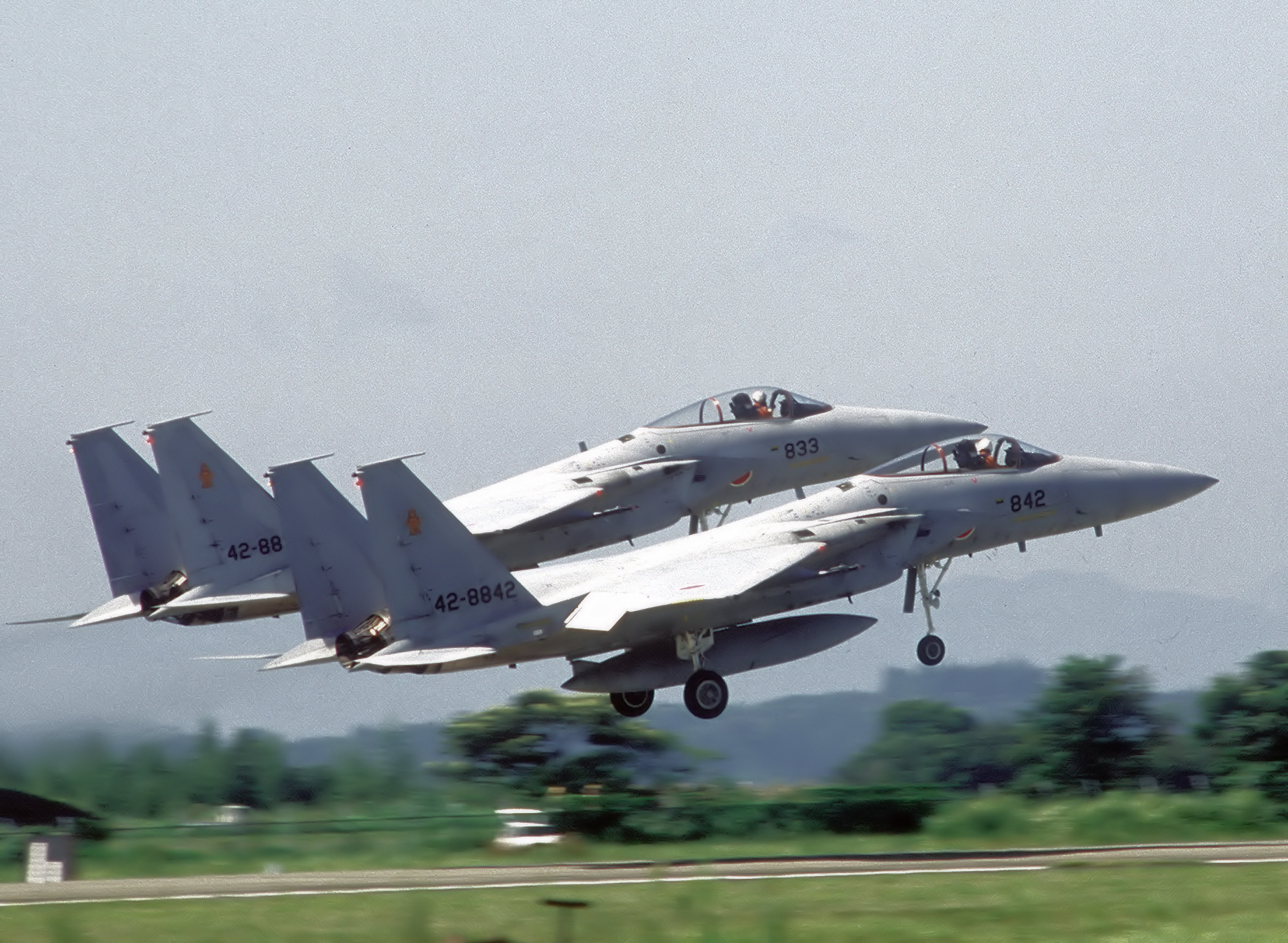
Two F-15J Eagles of the 202nd TFS, Japan Air Self-Defense Force, take off in formation during a joint US/Japan exercise

- The Japan Air Self-Defense Force operates Mitsubishi F-15J and F-15DJ fighters. It had 157 F-15Js and 45 F-15DJs in use as of November 2008.
  - 2nd Air Wing Chitose Air Base
    - 201st Tactical Fighter Squadron
    - 203rd Tactical Fighter Squadron
  - 6th Air Wing Komatsu Air Base
    - 303rd Tactical Fighter Squadron
    - 306th Tactical Fighter Squadron
  - 5th Air Wing Nyutabaru Air Base
    - 305th Tactical Fighter Squadron
  - 9th Air Wing Naha Air Base
    - 204th Tactical Fighter Squadron
    - 304th Tactical Fighter Squadron
  - Air Development and Test Wing
  - 23rd Flying Training Squadron

=== South Korea ===
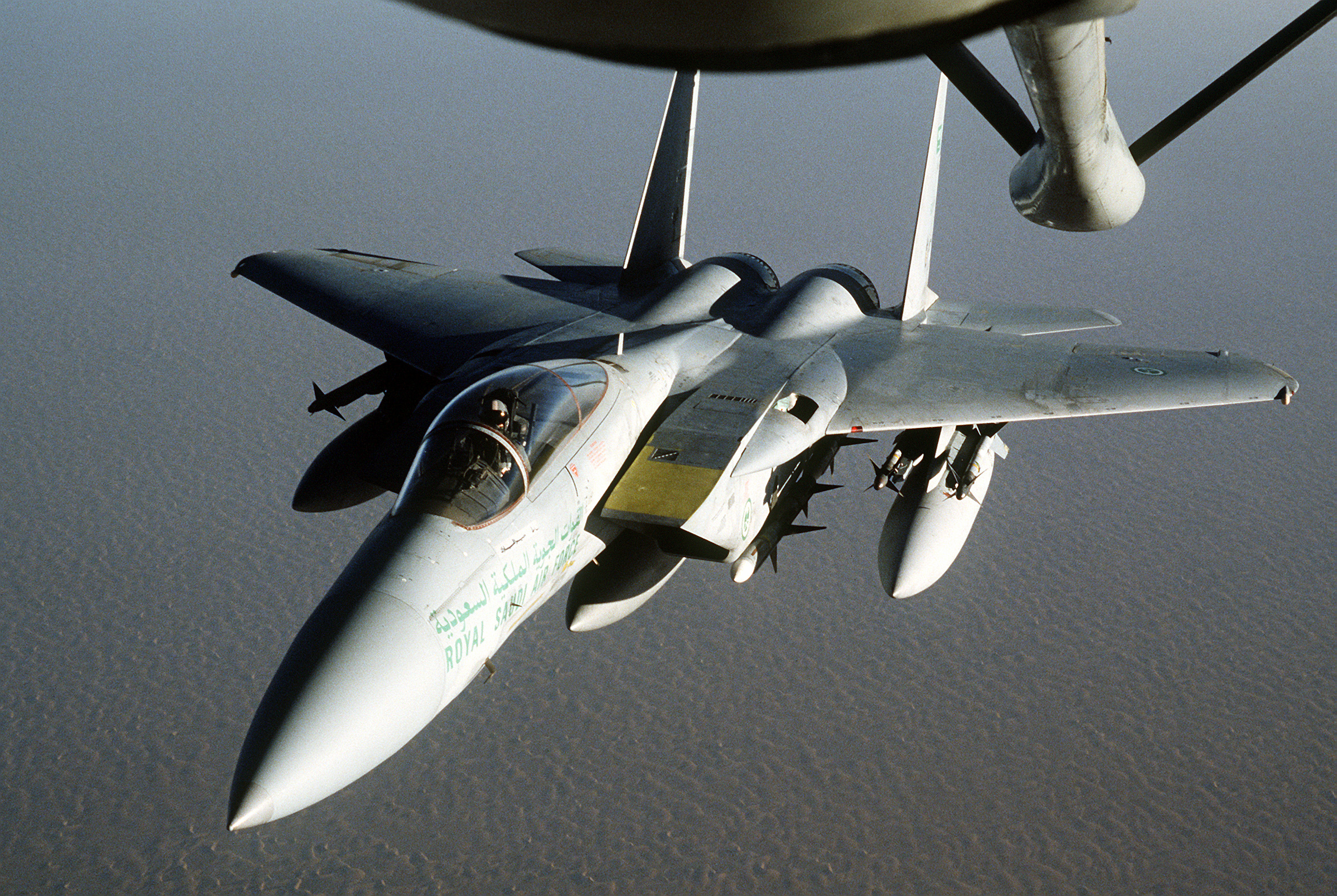
RSAF F-15 following air-to-air refuelling from a KC-135

- Republic of Korea Air Force received 61 F-15K "Slam Eagle" with two being lost in accidents. It has 59 F-15Ks in use.
  - 11th Fighter Wing (제11전투비행단), based at Daegu
    - 102nd Fighter Squadron
    - 122nd Fighter Squadron
    - 110th Fighter Squadron

Both the 102nd Fighter Squadron and the 122nd Fighter Squadron operate batch-1 F-15Ks (integrated with F110-GE-129A) while the 110th Fighter Squadron operates batch-2 F-15Ks (integrated with F100-P&W-229EPE).

=== Qatar ===
- Qatar Emiri Air Force has ordered 36 F-15QA "Ababil" variants. Eight delivered as of December 2021.
  - Flying Wing 5 – Al Udeid Air Base
    - 51st Squadron

=== Saudi Arabia ===
- Royal Saudi Air Force has operated 4 squadrons of F-15C/D (55/19) since 1981, received under Peace Sun after requesting the planes in 1977. They are based at Dhahran, Khamis Mushayt and Taif air bases. A stipulation in the Camp David Peace Agreement limited the number of Saudi F-15 to 60, holding surplus air frames in Luke AFB for RSAF pilot training. This limitation was later abandoned. The RSAF has 70 F-15C/D (49 F-15C and 21 F-15D) fighters along with 69 F-15S fighters in operation as of January 2011.
  - No. 2 Wing RSAF – King Abdulaziz Air Base
    - No. 5 Squadron RSAF (F-15C/D)
    - No. 34 Squadron RSAF (F-15C/D)
  - No. 3 Wing RSAF – King Abdulaziz Air Base
    - No. 13 Squadron RSAF (F-15C/D)
    - No. 92 Squadron RSAF (F-15S)
  - No. 5 Wing RSAF – King Khalid Air Base
    - No. 6 Squadron RSAF (F-15S)
    - No. 55 Squadron RSAF (F-15S)
  - No. 7 Wing RSAF – King Faisal Air Base
    - No. 2 Squadron RSAF (F-15C/D)

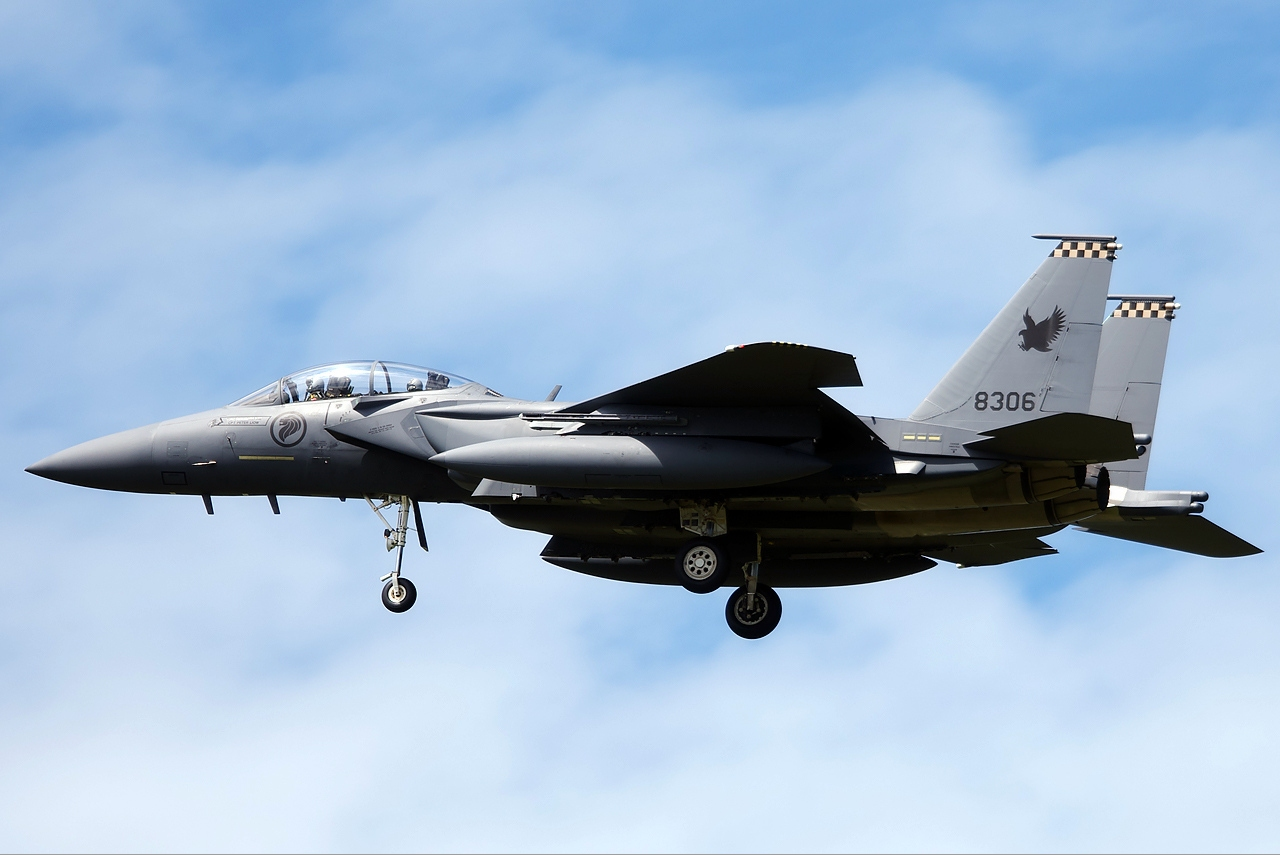
A F-15SG of the Singapore Air Force

=== Singapore ===
- Republic of Singapore Air Force (RSAF) operates 40 F-15SG
  - 142 Squadron "Gryphon"
  - 149 Squadron "Fighting Shikra"

=== United States ===
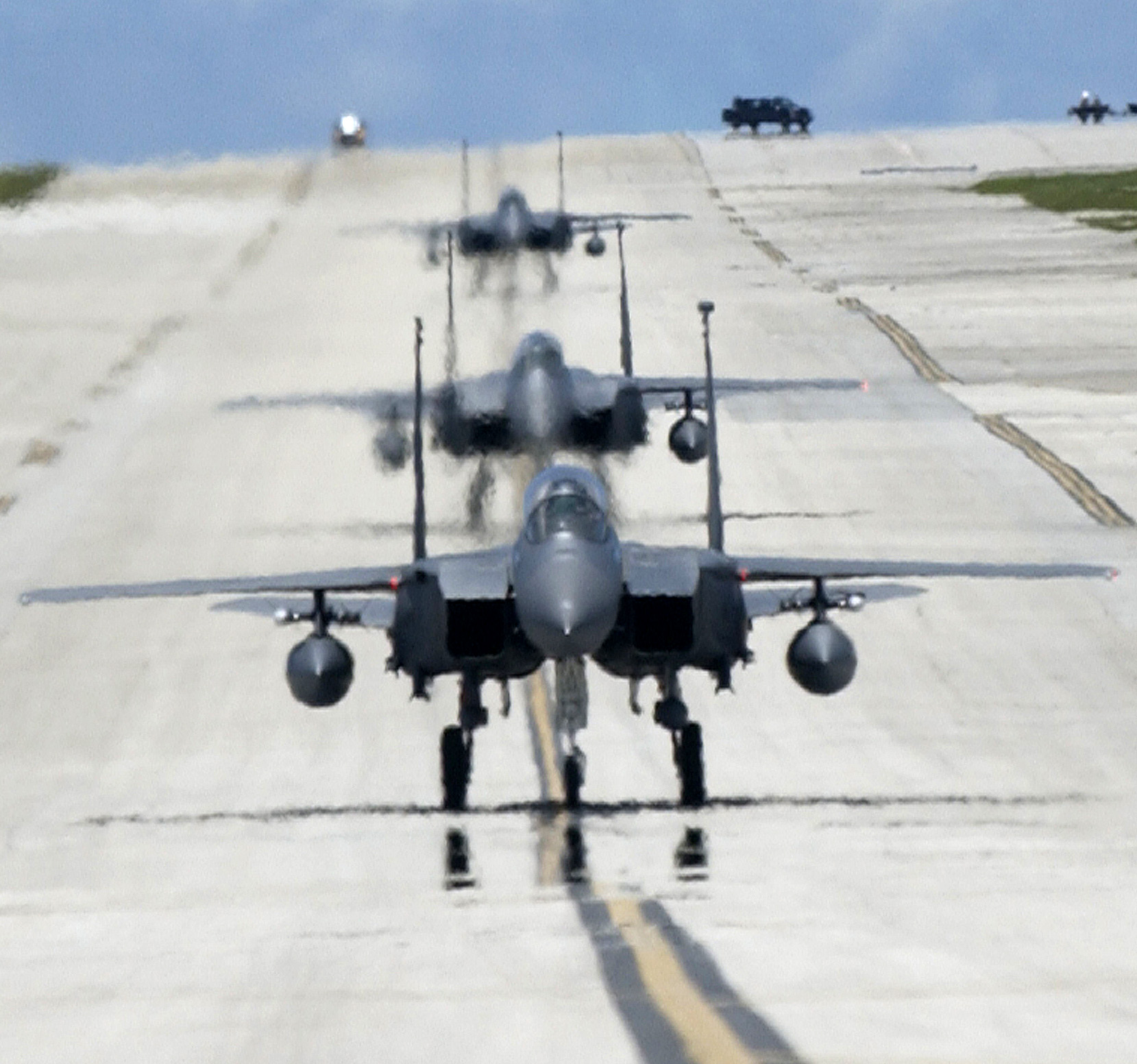
F-15Es from the 90th Expeditionary Fighter Squadron taxi to their parking spots on Andersen Air Force Base, Guam during exercise Valiant Shield 2006.

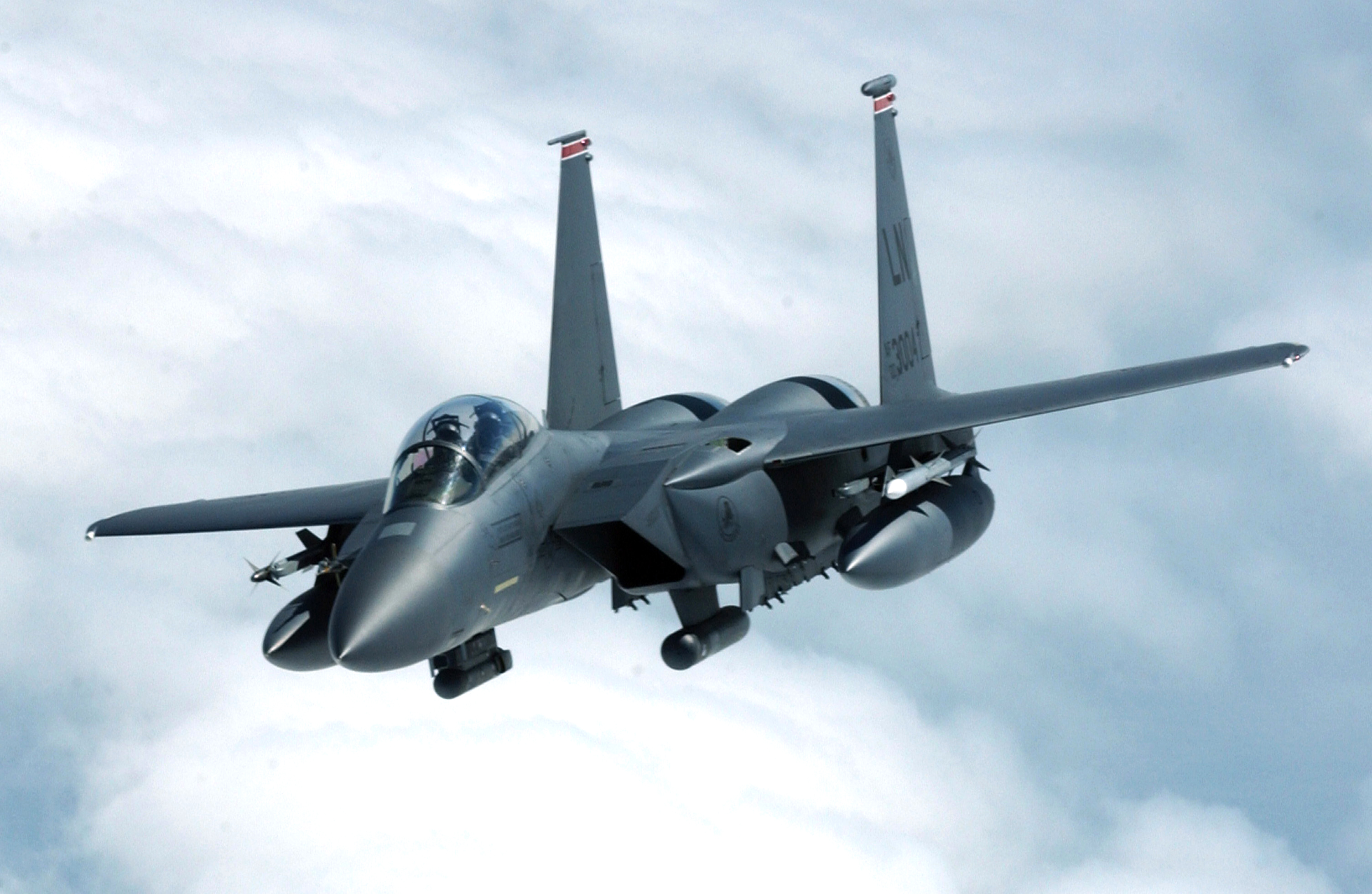
An F-15E Strike Eagle breaking away from a tanker.

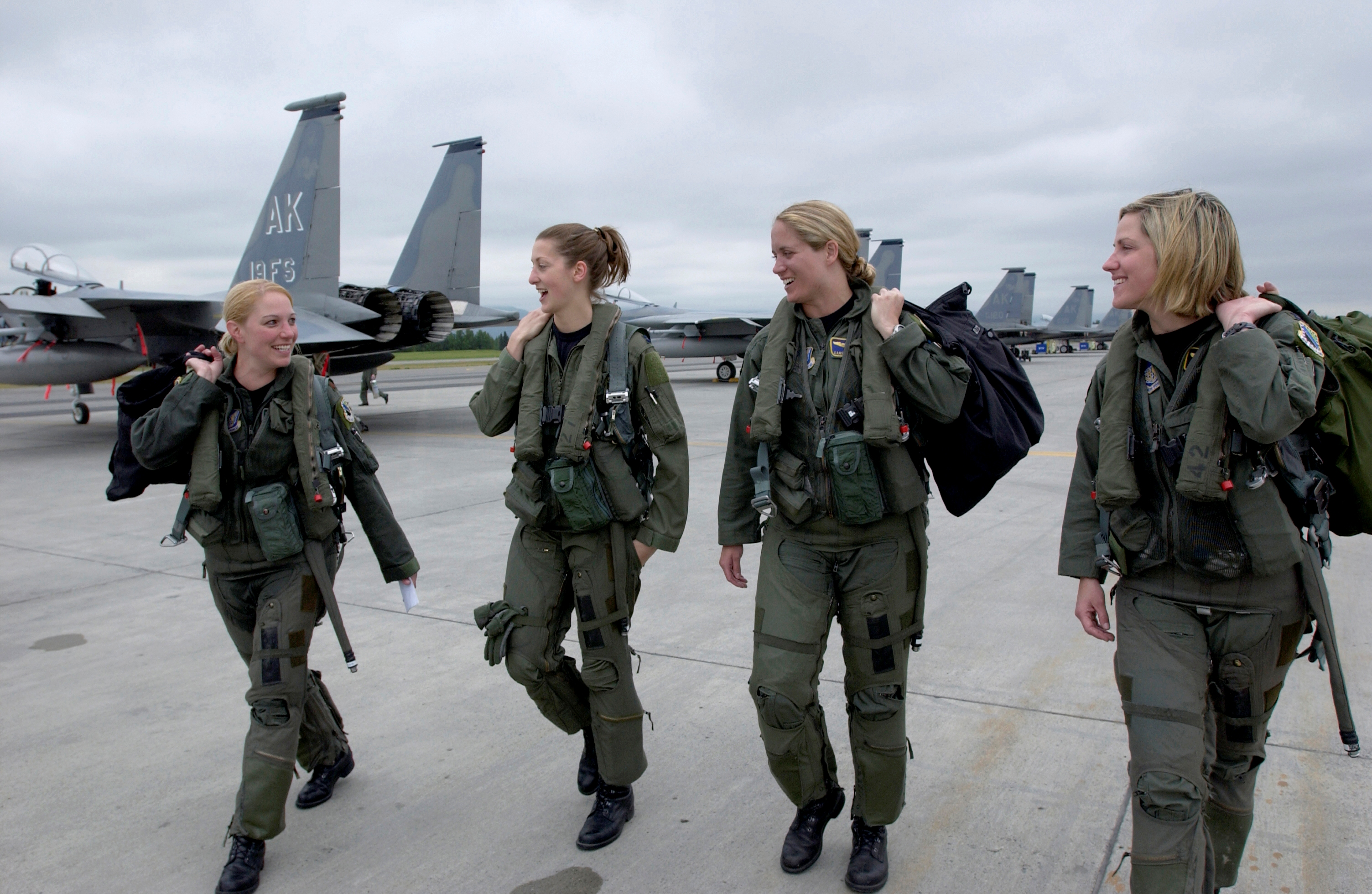
Pilots walking to their F-15 Eagles at Elmendorf Air Force Base, Alaska.

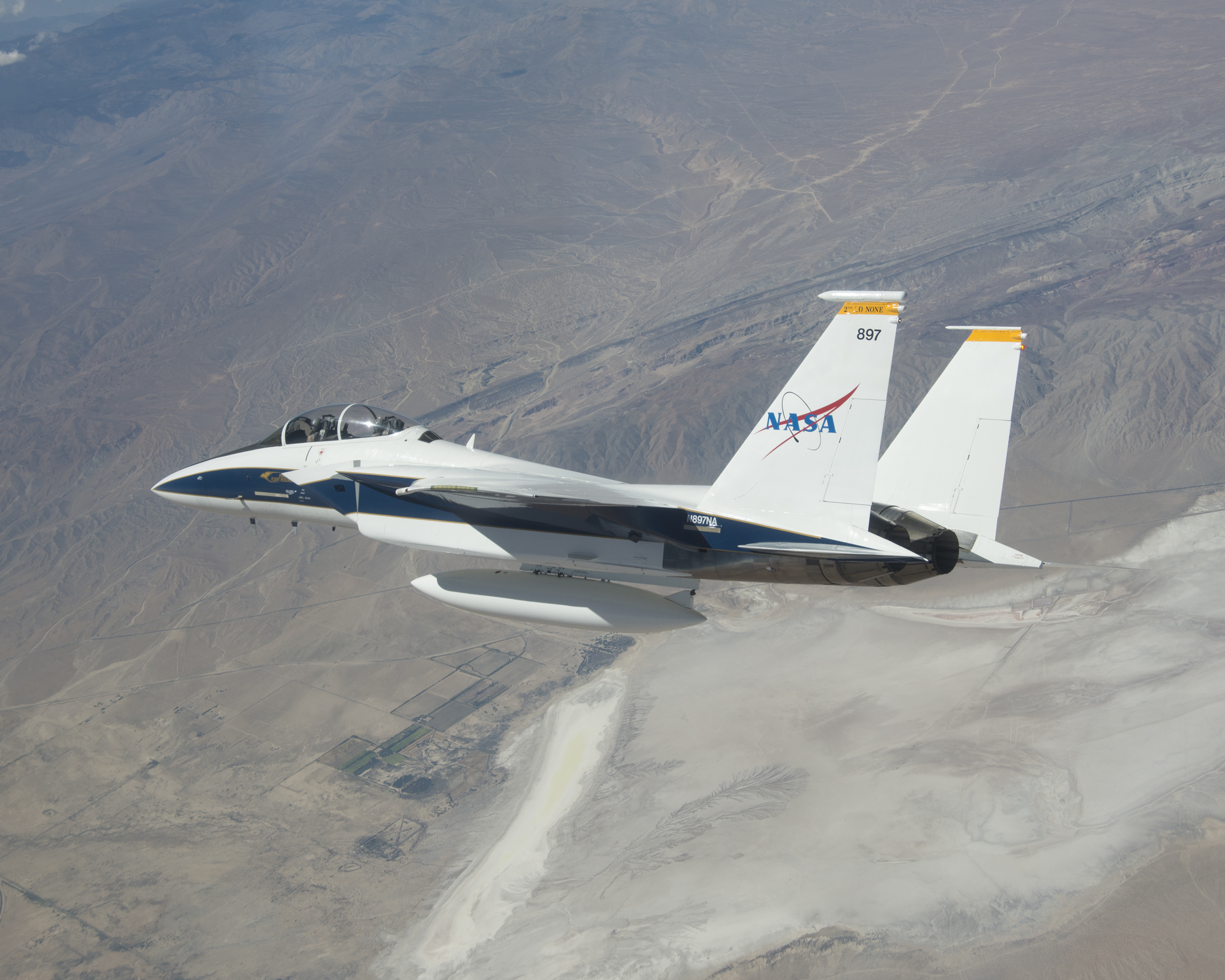
An F-15D operated by NASA flying over the Mojave Desert

- NASA currently operates one F-15B #836 as a test bed for a variety of flight research experiments and two F-15D, #884 and #897, for research support and pilot proficiency. All three F-15s are stationed at NASA's Armstrong Flight Research Center.
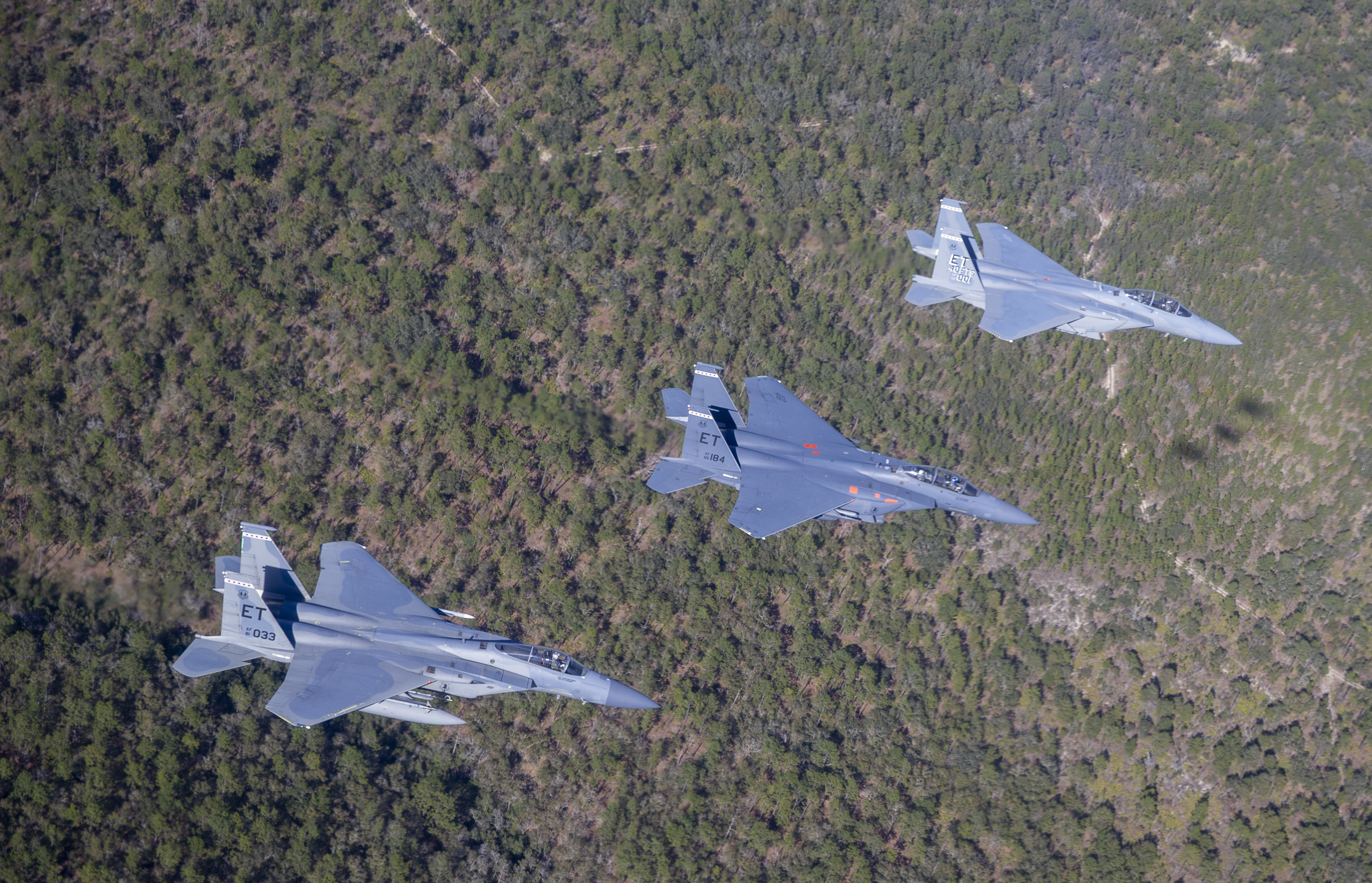
- F-15C, F-15E and F-15EX of USAF.
  United States Air Force operated 116 F-15C/D aircraft and 218 F-15E variants as of September 2024. Bold type below indicates Air Force units (Active, ANG and AFRC) operating F-15s in January 2012.
- Active units
  - Air Combat Command
    - 1st Fighter Wing – Langley AFB, Virginia
      - 27th Fighter Squadron (Converted to F-22 in 2005)
      - 71st Fighter Squadron (Reactivated as 71st Fighter Training Squadron flying the T-38 in 2015)
      - 94th Fighter Squadron (Converted to F-22 in 2005)
    - 4th Fighter Wing – Seymour Johnson AFB, North Carolina
      - 333d Fighter Squadron (F-15E)
      - 334th Fighter Squadron (F-15E)
      - 335th Fighter Squadron (F-15E)
      - 336th Fighter Squadron (F-15E)
    - 33d Fighter Wing – Eglin AFB, Florida
      - 58th Fighter Squadron (Converted to F-35A in 2009)
      - 59th Fighter Squadron (Reassigned to 53d Wing as 59th Test and Evaluation Squadron)
      - 60th Fighter Squadron (Inactivated in 2009; reactivated flying the F-35A in 2021)
    - 49th Fighter Wing – Holloman AFB, New Mexico
      - 7th Fighter Squadron (Converted to F-22A in 2008)
      - 8th Fighter Squadron (Converted to F-22A in 2009)
      - 9th Fighter Squadron (Reactivated as 9th Attack Squadron flying the MQ-9 in 2012)
    - 53d Wing – Eglin Air Force Base, Florida
      - 85th Test and Evaluation Squadron (F-15C, F-15E, F-15EX)
      - 422d Test and Evaluation Squadron, Nellis AFB, Nevada (ceased flying the F-15C in 2021, still flying the F-15E)
    - 57th Wing – Nellis AFB, Nevada
      - 17th Weapons Squadron (F-15E)
      - 65th Aggressor Squadron (Inactivated in 2014, reactivated with F-35A in 2022)
      - 433d Weapons Squadron (ceased flying the F-15C in 2021)
    - 366th Fighter Wing – Mountain Home AFB, Idaho (F-15C unit inactivated)
      - 389th Fighter Squadron (F-15E)
      - 390th Fighter Squadron (Reactivated as 390th Electronic Combat Squadron flying the EA-18 in 2010)
      - 391st Fighter Squadron (F-15E)
      - 428th Fighter Squadron mixed USAF/RSAF unit for training RSAF personnel on the new F-15SG (Peace Carvin V)
    - 379th Air Expeditionary Wing (F-15E)
    - 455th Air Expeditionary Wing – Bagram AB, Afghanistan (F-15E)
  - Air Education and Training Command
    - 56th Fighter Wing – Kingsley Field Air National Guard Base, Oregon
      - 550th Fighter Squadron (F-15E, inactivated 1991, Reactivated 1994–1995. Reactivated 2017-2025 flying the F-15C/D as an associate unit)
    - 325th Fighter Wing – Tyndall AFB, Florida
      - 1st Fighter Squadron (Inactivated in 2006)
      - 2d Fighter Squadron (Reactivated as 2d Fighter Training Squadron flying the T-38 in 2014)
      - 95th Fighter Squadron (Converted to F-22 in 2014)
    - 405th Tactical Training Wing / 58th Fighter Wing / 56th Fighter Wing – Luke AFB, Arizona
      - 426th Tactical Fighter Training Squadron (former F-15C/D, inactivated 1990)
      - 461st Fighter Squadron (F-15E, Reactivated as 461st Flight Test Squadron flying the F-35A in 2006)
      - 555th Fighter Squadron (F-15E, Transferred to Aviano AB, Italy flying the F-16C in 1994)
  - Pacific Air Forces
    - 3d Wing – Elmendorf AFB, Alaska
      - 12th Fighter Squadron (Reassigned to 27th Special Operations Wing as 12th Special Operations Squadron)
      - 19th Fighter Squadron (Converted to F-22 in 2010)
      - 43d Fighter Squadron (Converted to F-22 in 2002)
      - 54th Fighter Squadron (Inactivated in 2000)
      - 90th Fighter Squadron (F-15E, converted to F-22A in 2007)
    - 18th Wing – Kadena AB, Japan
      - 12th Fighter Squadron
      - 44th Fighter Squadron
      - 67th Fighter Squadron (F-15EX)
  - United States Air Forces in Europe
    - 32d Fighter Squadron – Soesterberg AB, Netherlands (base closed, squadron inactivated)
      - 32d Fighter Squadron
    - 36th Fighter Wing – Bitburg AB, Germany
      - 22d Fighter Squadron (Transferred to Spangdalem AB in 1994 and converted to F-16CJ)
      - 53d Fighter Squadron (Transferred to Spangdalem AB, 1994)
      - 525th Tactical Fighter Squadron (Inactivated 1992, Reactivated 2007 flying the F-22)
    - 48th Fighter Wing – RAF Lakenheath, UK (ceased flying the F-15C in 2022)
      - 492d Fighter Squadron (F-15E)
      - 493d Fighter Squadron (Converted to F-35A in 2022)
      - 494th Fighter Squadron (F-15E)
    - 52d Fighter Wing – Spangdahlem AB, Germany
      - 53d Fighter Squadron (Transferred from Bitburg AB, 1994, Inactivated 1999)
  - Air Defense – Tactical Air Command (ADTAC)
    - 5th Fighter-Interceptor Squadron – Minot AFB, North Dakota
    - 48th Fighter-Interceptor Squadron – Langley AFB, Virginia
    - 57th Fighter-Interceptor Squadron – NAS Keflavik, Iceland
    - 318th Fighter-Interceptor Squadron – McChord AFB, Washington
  - Air Force Materiel Command
    - 46th Test Wing / 96th Test Wing – Eglin AFB
      - 40th Flight Test Squadron (F-15E, F-15EX)
    - 412th Test Wing – Edwards AFB, California
      - 415th Flight Test Squadron (F-15E)
      - 419th Flight Test Squadron (F-15C/D, F-15E)
- Air Force Reserve
  - Air Force Reserve Command
    - 414th Fighter Group – Seymour Johnson AFB, North Carolina
      - 307th Fighter Squadron (F-15E)
- Air National Guard
  - Florida Air National Guard
    - 125th Fighter Wing – Jacksonville ANGB
      - 159th Fighter Squadron (Converted to F-35A in 2025)
  - California Air National Guard
    - 144th Fighter Wing – Fresno ANGB
      - 194th Fighter Squadron (F-15C/D)
  - Hawaii Air National Guard
    - 154th Wing – Hickam AFB
      - 199th Fighter Squadron (Converted to F-22 associate unit in 2010)
  - Louisiana Air National Guard
    - 159th Fighter Wing – NAS/JRB New Orleans
      - 122d Fighter Squadron (F-15C/D)
  - Massachusetts Air National Guard
    - 102d Fighter Wing – Otis ANGB
      - 101st Fighter Squadron (Lost F-15s in 2007 due to BRAC 2005. Now a non-flying Intelligence squadron.)
    - 104th Fighter Wing – Barnes ANGB
      - 131st Fighter Squadron (F-15C/D)
  - Missouri Air National Guard
    - 131st Fighter Wing – Lambert-St. Louis International Airport
      - 110th Fighter Squadron (Converted to B-2 associate unit and moved to Whiteman AFB in 2008)
  - Montana Air National Guard
    - 120th Fighter Wing – Great Falls International Airport/Great Falls ANGB - last F-15s departed in October 2013.
      - 186th Fighter Squadron (Reactivated as 186th Airlift Squadron flying the C-130)
  - Oregon Air National Guard
    - 142d Fighter Wing – Portland International Airport/Portland ANGS
      - 123d Fighter Squadron (F-15C/D/EX)
    - 173d Fighter Wing – Kingsley Field ANGB
      - 114th Fighter Squadron (F-15C/D)
