= VII Bomber Command =

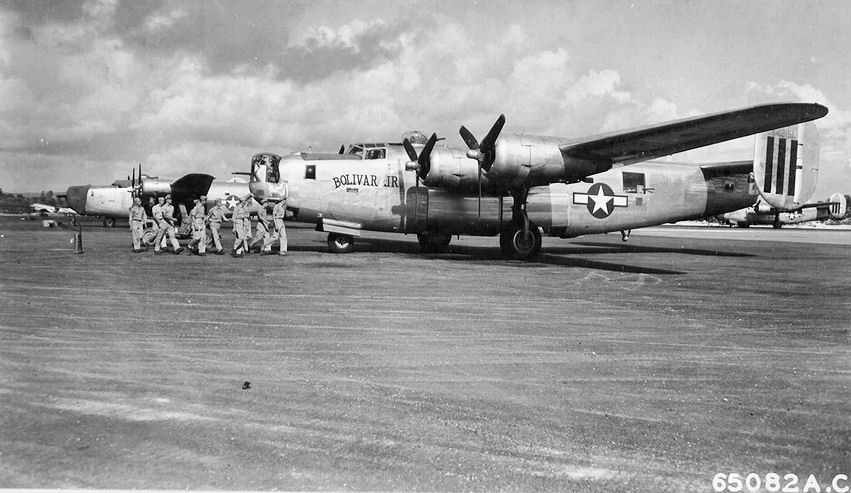
- VII Bomber Command B-24 Liberator in the Marianas
- Active: 1942–1946
- Country: United States
- Branch: United States Air Force
- Role: Command of bomber units
- Part of: Seventh Air Force
- Engagements: China-Burma-India Theater; Pacific Theater of Operations

The VII Bomber Command is an inactive United States Air Force unit. Its last assignment was with Seventh Air Force, based on Okinawa. It was inactivated on 31 March 1946.

It engaged in patrol operations from Hawaii from January 1942. On the night of 22-23 December 1942, twenty-six Consolidated B-24D Liberators of the 307th Bombardment Group staged through Midway Island for a strike on Wake Island with 135 500-pound general purpose bombs and 21 incendiaries. The attack may have taken the Japanese by surprise, as neither searchlights nor antiaircraft fire were encountered until after the bombing had begun. All planes returned safely, with only slight damage to two.

After late 1943, VII Bomber Command served in combat in the Central and Western Pacific.

== Lineage ==
- Constituted as the 7th Bomber Command on 23 January 1942 (Note: Maurer indicates that the unit was constituted as the "VII" Bomber Command. However, the unit was constituted and activated with an arabic number in its name. The use of roman numerals to designate Army Air Forces combat commands did not begin until September 1942. "Air Force Historical Research Agency Organizational Reconds: Types of USAF Organizations". Air Force History Index. 9 January 2008.)

Activated on 29 January 1942

- Redesignated VII Bomber Command c. 18 September 1942

Inactivated on 31 March 1946
Disbanded on 8 October 1948

=== Commanders ===
- Brig Gen Willis H. Hale (29 January 1942 – 19 June 1942)
- Col Albert F. Hegenberger (20 June 1942 – 25 June 1942)
- Brig Gen William E. Lynd (25 June 1942 – November 1942)
- Brig Gen LaVerne G. Saunders (8 January 1943 – January 1943)
- Brig Gen Truman H. Landon (January 1943 – 10 December 1944)
- Brig Gen Lawrence J. Carr (11 December 1944 – October 1945)

=== Assignments ===
- Hawaiian Air Force (later 7th Air Force, Seventh Air Force) (attached to Patrol Wing 2, 1942; Task Force 59, May 1944-unknown), 23 January 1942
- not confirmed, 1 January – 31 March 1946.

=== Stations ===
- Hickam Field, Hawaii, 29 January 1942
- Funafuti Airfield, Nanumea, Gilbert Islands, November 1943
- Hawkins Field, Tarawa, Gilbert Islands, January 1944

Bairiki (Mullinix) Airfield, January–March 1944

- Kwajalein Airfield, Kwajalein, Marshall Islands, March 1944
- East Field (Saipan), Mariana Islands, August 1944
- Yontan Airfield, Okinawa, July 1945 – March 1946

=== Components ===
Groups

- 5th Bombardment Group: 29 January 1942 – 4 January 1943
- 11th Bombardment Group: 29 January 1942 – 5 January 1943; 8 April 1943 – 23 November 1945
- 30th Bombardment Group: 17 October 1943 – 17 March 1945
- 41st Bombardment Group: 16 October 1943 – 27 January 1945
- 90th Bombardment Group: 12 September – November 1942
- 307th Bombardment Group: 1 November 1942– 9 February 1943
- 319th Bombardment Group: c. 2 July – 18 December 1945
- 494th Bombardment Group: c. 24 June 1944 – c. 8 December 1945 (under operational control of Combined Task Group 95.6 3 November 1944, Fifth Air Force 13 December 1944, V Bomber Command 15 December 1944, Thirteenth Air Force 28 January 1945, XIII Bomber Command 20 March 1945, Thirteenth Air Force 18 March – 14 April 1945)

Squadrons

- 1st Reconnaissance Squadron: attached 10 December 1945 – March 1946
- 163d Liaison Squadron: 1–25 December 1945
- 305th Fighter Control Squadron: 1 December 1945 – 1 January 1946
- 437th Bombardment Squadron: 18 December 1945 – 4 January 1946
- 439th Bombardment Squadron: 18 December 1945 – 4 January 1946
- 440th Bombardment Squadron: 18 December 1945 – 4 January 1946
- 868th Bombardment Squadron: 1–December 1945
