= RAF Horsham St Faith =

Former RAF station in Norfolk, England

RAF Horsham St Faith USAAF Station 123
- Norwich, Norfolk in England
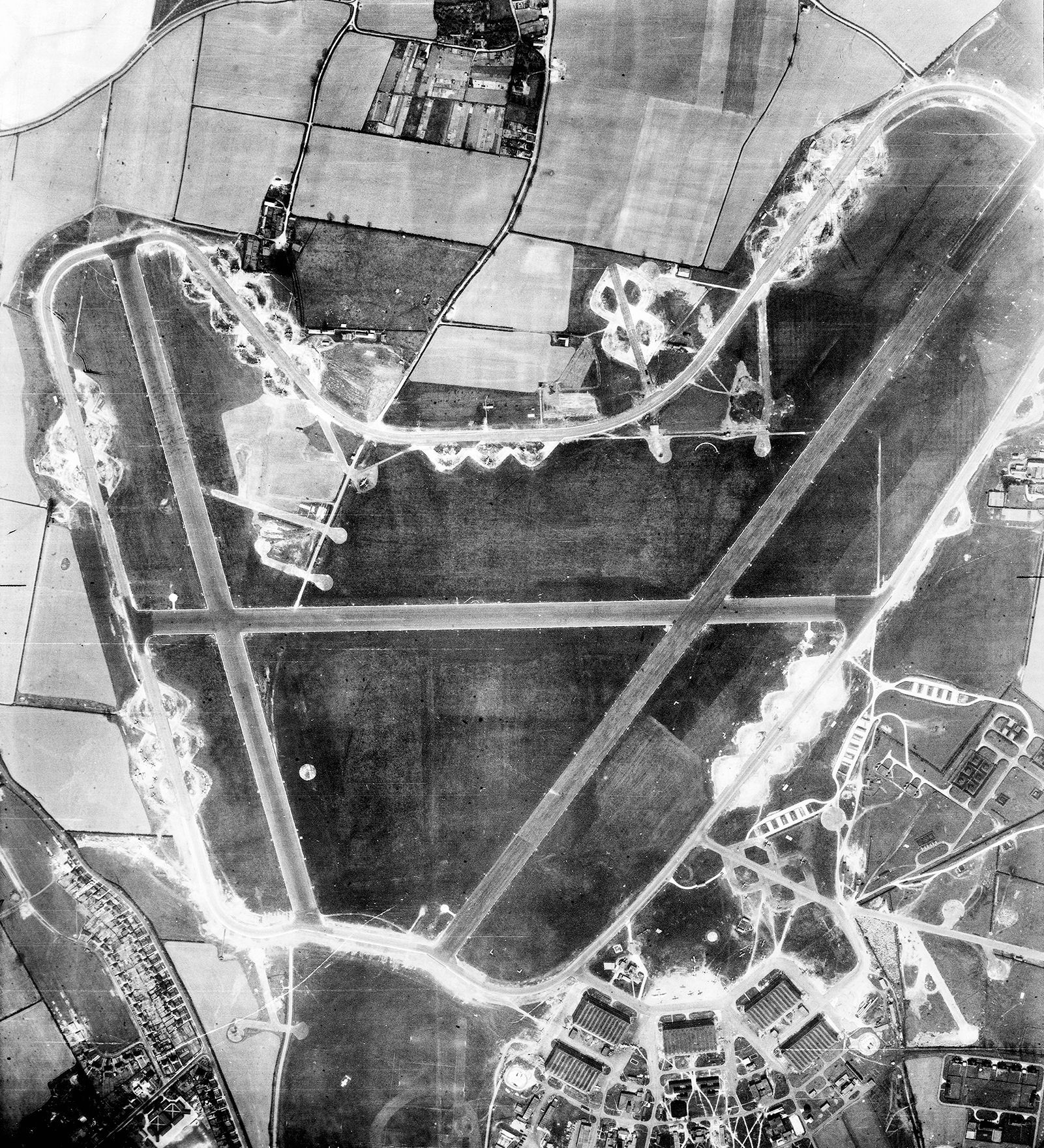
- Aerial photograph of RAF Horsham St Faith airfield, 16 April 1946

Site information
- Type: Royal Air Force station parent station 1940 -
- Code: HF
- Owner: Ministry of Defence
- Operator: Royal Air Force; United States Army Air Forces
- Controlled by: RAF Bomber Command (1940-42); No. 2 Group RAF; Eighth Air Force (1942-45); RAF Fighter Command (1945-63)

Location
- Location within Norfolk RAF Horsham St Faith (the United Kingdom)
- Coordinates: 52°40′33″N 01°16′58″E
- Grid reference: TG220138

Site history
- Built: 1939
- In use: 1 June 1940 - 24 March 1967
- Battles/wars: European Theatre of World War II; (Air Offensive, Europe July 1942 - May 1945); Cold War

Airfield information
- Elevation: 31 metres (102 ft) AMSL
Runways
Direction	Length and surface
09/27	1,841 metres (6,040 ft) Concrete
00/00	1,300 metres (4,265 ft) Concrete
00/00	1,300 metres (4,265 ft) Concrete

Royal Air Force Horsham St Faith or more simply RAF Horsham St Faith is a former Royal Air Force station near Norwich, Norfolk, England which was operational from 1939 to 1963. It was then developed as Norwich International Airport.

== RAF Bomber Command use ==
The airfield was first developed in 1939 and officially opened on 1 June 1940 as a bomber station. It had been built pre-war and had five C-type hangars, permanent brick and tiled buildings with central-heating and a high standard of domestic accommodation.

The first aircraft there were Bristol Blenheims dispersed from No. 21 Squadron RAF at RAF Watton in 1939 but the first operational aircraft there were fighters: Supermarine Spitfires of No. 19 and No. 66 squadrons from RAF Duxford.

Boulton Paul Defiants of A Flight, No. 264 Squadron RAF began sorties on 12 May 1940.

The first operational bomber units were No. 139 Squadron RAF and No. 114 Squadron RAF of No. 2 Group of RAF Bomber Command with the Blenheim IV. No. 114 then moved onto RAF Oulton which was a new satellite station for Horsham.

Two of the early visitors to the new airfield were the Right Honourable Neville Chamberlain and General Sir Alan Brooke.

In August 1941, a Bristol Blenheim bomber from No. 18 Squadron RAF flying from Horsham St Faith en route to attack a power station at Gosnay, re-routed over the airfield at Saint-Omer (Wizernes) where it delivered (by parachute) a pair of artificial legs for Wing Commander Douglas Bader who had been shot down over France and had lost his artificial limbs in the process.

In December 1941 No. 105 Squadron RAF arrived from RAF Swanton Morley to begin training on the new de Havilland Mosquito fast bomber and from June 1942, the squadron carried out photographic and bombing missions over Germany.

- No. 18 Squadron RAF (1941): Bristol Blenheim IV
- No. 19 Squadron RAF (1940): Supermarine Spitfire I
- No. 21 Squadron RAF detachment (1939–1940): Bristol Blenheim IV
- No. 64 Squadron RAF (1945): North American Mustang III & IV, de Havilland Hornet F.1
- No. 66 Squadron RAF (1940): Supermarine Spitfire I
- No. 105 Squadron RAF (1941–1942): de Havilland Mosquito IV
- No. 107 Squadron RAF detachment (1939–1941): Bristol Blenheim IV
- No. 110 Squadron RAF detachment (1939–1942): Bristol Blenheim IV
- No. 114 Squadron RAF (1940): Bristol Blenheim IV
- No. 139 Squadron RAF (1941): Bristol Blenheim IV, (1942), de Havilland Mosquito IV

== United States Army Air Forces use ==
In September 1942 Horsham St Faith was made available to the United States Army Air Forces for use by the Eighth Air Force. The USAAF designated the airfield as Station 123 (HF).

USAAF Station Units assigned to RAF Horsham St Faith were:

- 469th Sub-Depot
- 18th Weather Squadron
- 60th Station Complement Squadron
- Headquarters (96th Combat Bomb Wing)

Regular Army Station Units included:

- 1080th Signal Company
- 1105th Quartermaster Company
- 1119th Military Police Company
- 13th Special Services Company
- 1686th Ordnance Supply & Maintenance Company
- 858th Chemical Company

319th Bombardment Group (Medium)

The first USAAF tenants at the airfield was the 319th Bombardment Group (Medium), arriving from RAF Shipdham on 4 October 1942. Flying the Martin B-26 Marauder medium bomber, the group stayed until 11 November when the group reassigned to Twelfth Air Force as part of the North African Campaign at Saint-Leu Airfield, Algeria.

The airfield then lay unused over the winter.

56th Fighter Group

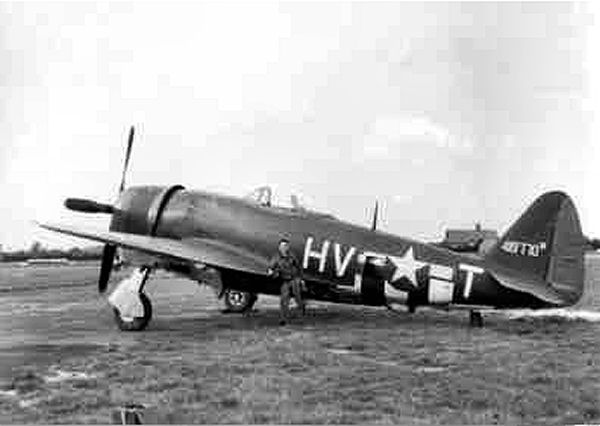
P-47 of the 61st Fighter Squadron

With the departure of the Marauders to North Africa, the next USAAF group to use Horsham St Faith was the 56th Fighter Group, transferring from RAF Kings Cliffe on 6 April 1943. The group consisted of the following squadrons:

- 61st Fighter Squadron (HV)
- 62d Fighter Squadron (LM)
- 63d Fighter Squadron (UN)

The group entered combat with a fighter sweep in the area of St Omer on 13 April 1943, and flew numerous missions over France, the Low Countries, and Germany to escort bombers that attacked industrial establishments, V-weapon sites, submarine pens, and other targets on the Continent.

On 8 July, the group had to move to RAF Halesworth when work started on enlarging Horsham St Faith for use as a heavy bomber station with hard surface runways and concrete hardstands and a perimeter track. The move was not particularly popular with the men of the 56th who had to give up the comparative comfort of Horsham's barracks for the temporary hut (and muddy) accommodations at Halesworth.

458th Bombardment Group (Heavy)

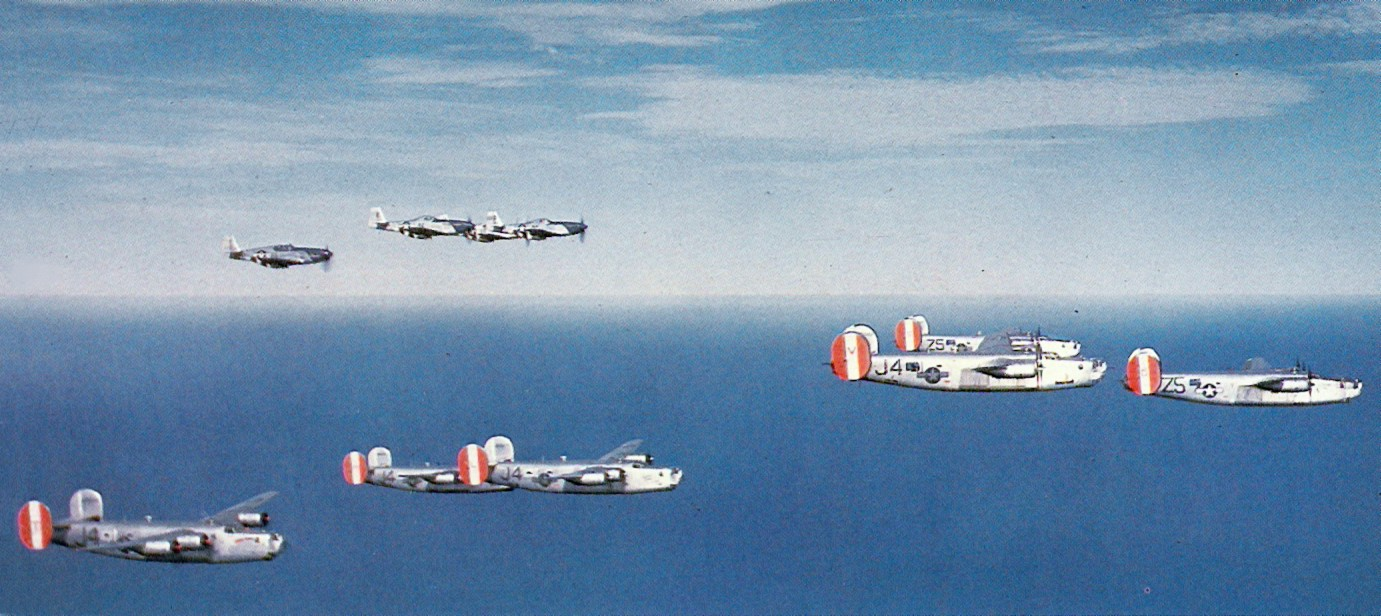
B-24s of the 753d and 754th Bomb Squadrons on a mission from Horsham St Faith.

With runway construction finished, The 458th Bombardment Group (Heavy), arrived at Horsham St Faith late in January 1944 from Tonopah Army Airfield Nevada. The group flew its first mission on 24 February with Consolidated B-24 Liberators.

On 2 March a heavily loaded bomber taking off crashed on nearby Hellesdon which was under the flightpath. In September 1944, like other bomber groups in the area it participated in shipping fuel for American forces to France.

The group flew its last combat mission on 25 April 1945, flying 240 missions losing 47 aircraft in combat along with another 18 in accidents before returning to Sioux Falls AAF South Dakota in July 1945.

== Postwar Royal Air Force use ==
The airfield was transferred to RAF Fighter Command on 10 July 1945 when it was occupied by four Gloster Meteor Squadrons one of which. No. 307, was entirely composed of Polish personnel. Meteor jet aircraft arrived during 1946–1948 and in June, an echo of the airfield's former occupants was provided by a visit by a Swedish North American P-51 Mustang squadron.

RAF Horsham St Faith was a front-line RAF station for many years, and its squadrons participated in many post-war exercises.

- No. 23 Squadron RAF (January – July 1952): de Havilland Mosquito NF.36, de Havilland Vampire NF10, (1955–1956), English Electric Canberra (1956–1957), de Havilland Venom NF3, (1958–1959 & 1960) Gloster Javelin FAW4 & FAW7
- No. 34 Squadron RAF (1949–1951): various target and target towing aircraft
- No. 65 Squadron RAF (1946): Supermarine Spitfire LF16E, de Havilland Hornet F1
- No. 118 Squadron RAF (1945–1946): North American Mustang III
- No. 141 Squadron RAF (1955–1956): de Havilland Venom NF3
- No. 228 Squadron RAF detachment (1959–1964): Bristol Sycamore HR14 then Westland Whirlwind HAR2, HAR4 & HAR10
- No. 275 Squadron RAF detachment (1957–1959): Bristol Sycamore HR14, Westland Whirlwind HAR2 & HAR4
- No. 307 Polish Night Fighter Squadron (August 1945–1946): de Havilland Mosquito XXX
- No. 695 Squadron RAF (1945–1949): various target and target towing aircraft
- Horsham Wing:
  - No. 74 Squadron RAF (August 1946–1950): Gloster Meteor F.3 & F.4, Hawker Hunter F.4/6 (1957–1960)
  - No. 245 Squadron RAF (August 1946 – June 1955): Gloster Meteor F.3, F.4 & F.8
  - No. 257 Squadron RAF (April 1947–1950): Gloster Meteor F.3, F.4 & F.8
  - No. 263 Squadron RAF (September 1947–1950): Gloster Meteor F.3, F.4 & F.8

The station was deactivated on 1 August 1963.

== Units ==
The following units were here at some point:

- No. 8 Blind Approach Training Flight RAF
- No. 8 Fighter Command Servicing Unit RAF
- No. 11 Fighter Command Servicing Unit RAF
- No. 12 (East Anglia) Sector RAF
- No. 12 Group Communications Flight RAF
- No. 12 Group Modification Centre RAF
- No. 71 (Bomber) Wing RAF
- No. 102 Gliding School RAF
- No. 1508 (Beam Approach Training) Flight RAF
- No. 4199 Anti-Aircraft Flight RAF Regiment
- Eastern Sector HQ RAF
- Ferry Training Flight RAF became No. 1444 (Ferry Training) Flight RAF
- Fighter Command Modification Centre RAF
- No. 1655 Mosquito Conversion Unit RAF
- Norfolk Sector HQ RAF
- Photographic Development Unit RAF

== Current use ==
With the end of military control, RAF Horsham St Faith was redeveloped into Norwich International Airport.

Most of the Second World War buildings remain, although converted for a variety of purposes. Three of the five large pre-war hangars are still being used for aircraft maintenance. Two have been converted for commercial use. The control tower still exists although the top has been restored and a new tower has been built adjacent to the present main runway. Other wartime buildings now form part of the airport industrial estate (owned by the County and City Councils) and are intermingled with many newer structures.

The former RAF accommodation blocks situated towards Catton were until 1993 used by the University of East Anglia as accommodation for students. Known to students as "Fifers Lane" or "Horsham" halls, these have since been demolished and the site redeveloped as housing. The remaining MOD property, formerly airmen's quarters, has become married quarters for nearby RAF stations.

Whilst most runways and taxi-tracks from the military airfield remain, only one runway is primarily used, east–west runway 09–27, which was extended eastwards by the RAF in 1956, to avoid take-offs and landings over built-up areas. A section of the old main runway is currently used for light aircraft.

Adjacent to the airport terminal building opened in 1988 there is a memorial display relating to the USAAF, consisting of photographs, paintings, and a plaque commemorating the American use of the airfield.

Behind the modern control tower, and now on a section of the former airfield isolated by the Norwich Northern Distributor Road, is the City of Norwich Aviation Museum.

== See also ==
- List of former Royal Air Force stations
