= 319th Operations Group =

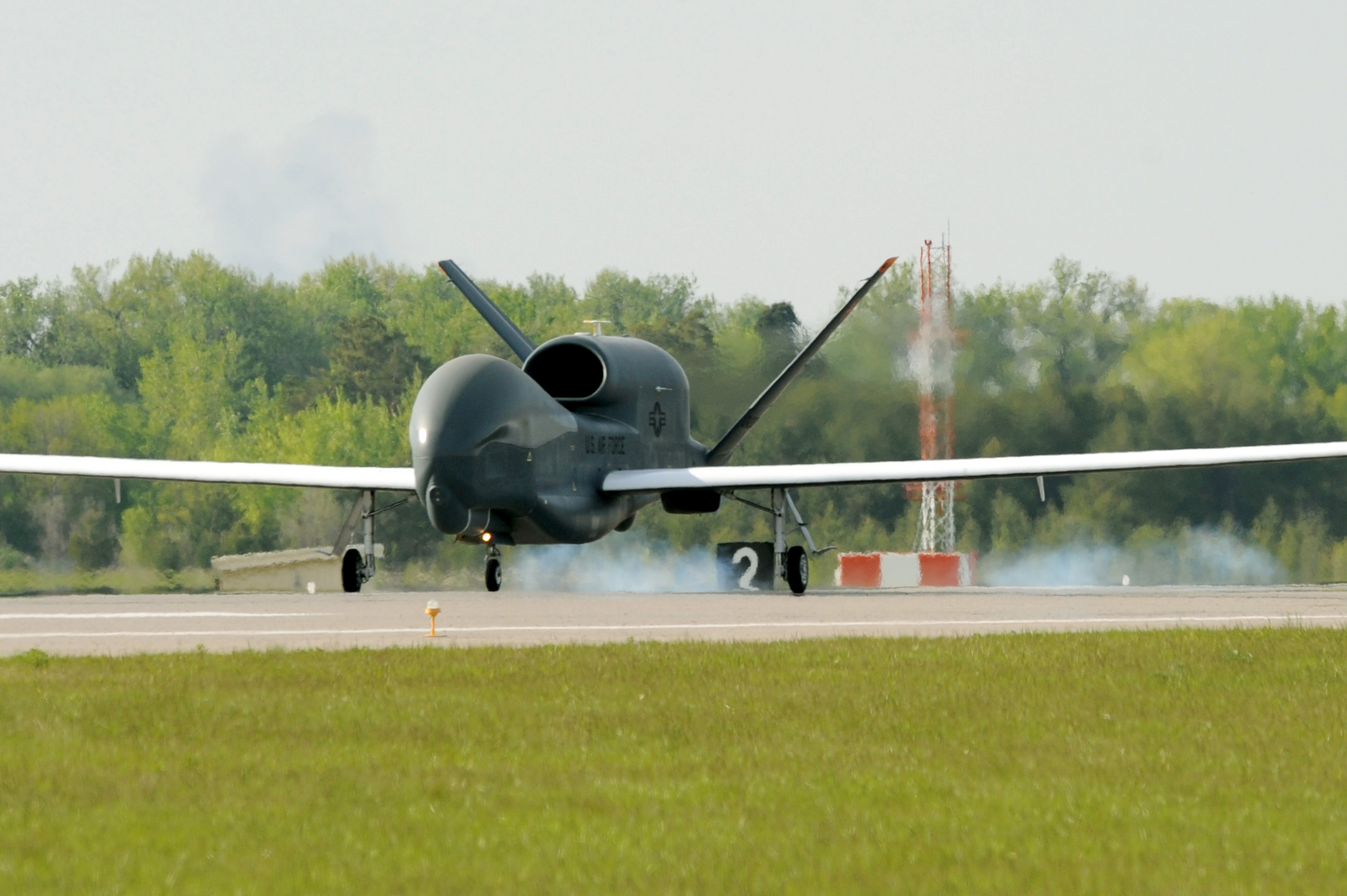
- RQ-4 Global Hawk landing at Grand Forks AFB
- Active: 1942–1945; 1946–1949; 1949–1951; 1955–1957; 1991–2010; 2019-present
- Country: United States
- Branch: United States Air Force
- Role: air refueling
- Engagements: Mediterranean Theater of Operations; Pacific Ocean Theater
- Decorations: Distinguished Unit Citation; French Croix de Guerre with Palm

Insignia
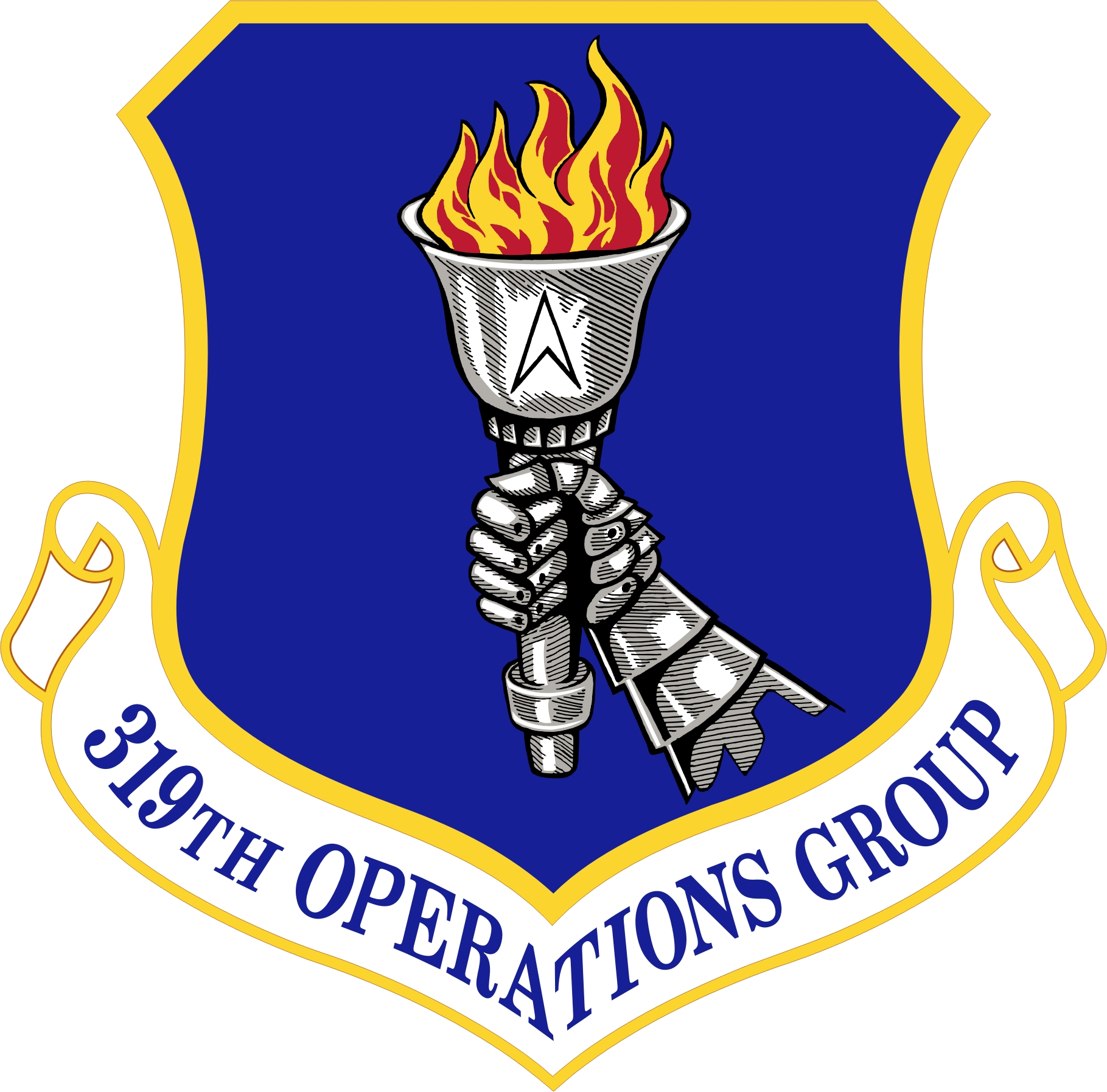
- 319th Operations Group emblem (Note: When assigned to the 319th Wing, the group uses the wing emblem with the group designation on the scroll. Air Force Instruction 84–105, Organizational Lineage, Honors and Heraldry, 19 March 2013, para 3.3.3.)

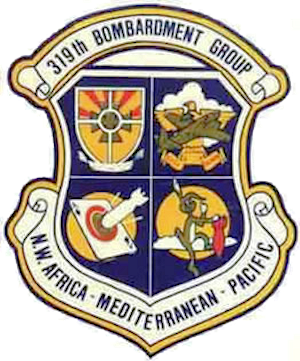
- Postwar 319th Bombardment Group emblem (Note: This emblem was used during the war in a slightly different form. The shield was straight-sided and there were no scrolls. Watkins, pp. 82–83.)

The 319th Operations Group is a United States Air Force unit assigned to 319th Reconnaissance Wing, Air Combat Command. It is stationed at Grand Forks Air Force Base, North Dakota operating RQ-4 Global Hawk remotely piloted aircraft (RPA) in the intelligence, surveillance and reconnaissance (ISR) role.

The group was first activated during World War II as the 319th Bombardment Group, the first Martin B-26 Marauder group in the Mediterranean Theater of Operations (MTO) during the war. The group received two Distinguished Unit Citations during the war. In 1945, the group was re-equipped with the North American B-25 Mitchell in combat in the MTO before returning to the US to transition to the Douglas A-26 Invader. After retraining the group deployed to Okinawa, where it flew combat missions over China as part of Seventh Air Force against Imperial Japanese forces until the war's end. One of the original Mercury Seven astronauts, Deke Slayton, flew A-26s from Okinawa as a part of the group's 438th Bombardment Squadron in 1945.

The group was reactivated in the reserve in December 1946. It does not appear to have been fully manned or equipped, and when mobilized in 1951 for the Korean War, its personnel were used to man other units and the group was inactivated. It again became part of the reserve force in 1955 as the 319th Fighter-Bomber Group, but was inactivated in 1957, when the reserves converted to the troop carrier mission. It remained inactive until 1991.

In 2019 the group was reactivated at Grand Forks Air Force Base as the Operations Group in charge of all active duty RQ-4 Global Hawk operations.

== History ==
=== World War II ===
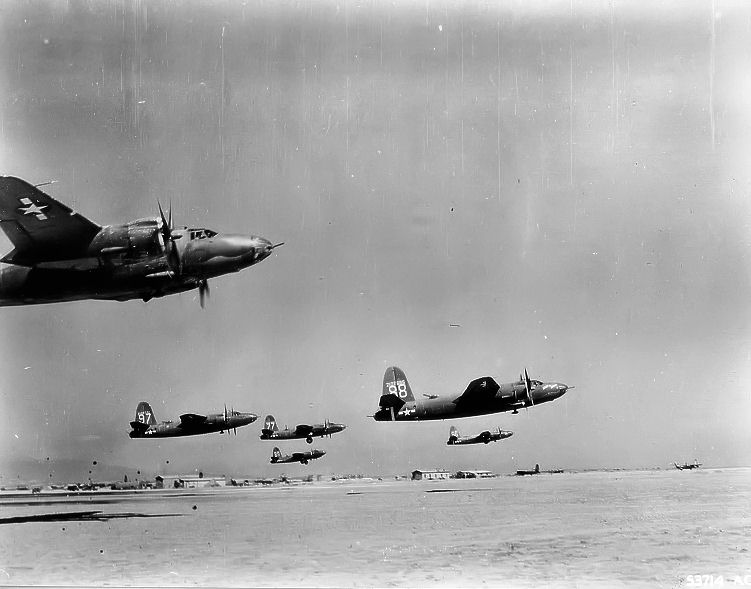
319th Bomb Group B-26 Marauders taking off en-masse from a desert base in North Africa, 1943

The 319th Bombardment Group trained in Louisiana in Martin B-26 Marauders and after completing initial training, the group reported in October and November 1942 to England for staging to the Mediterranean Theater of Operations, where it was assigned to the Twelfth Air Force.

After it moved to Algeria as the first Marauder unit in that theater, arriving with just 15 aircraft and losing group commander Col. Alvord Rutherford over France en route, the 319th entered combat for the first time on 28 November, bombing and strafing warehouses, docks, and railroad yards at Sfax in Tunisia. From then to March 1943, the group bombed German and Italian targets in Tunisia and Libya, including airfields and enemy shipping along the Mediterranean Coast. The 319th trained in French Morocco from March, then returned to combat in June 1943, attacking enemy targets on Italian islands in the Mediterranean, including Sicily, Sardinia, and Pantelleria. From bases in Algeria and Tunisia, the group supported the Allied invasion of Italy, bombing bridges and marshalling yards during the late summer and early autumn of 1943. In November, it moved to Sardinia, to strike Axis targets in central Italy. Early in 1944, the 319th supported Allied ground forces as they advanced in the Cassino and Anzio areas. Later in the year, using North American B-25 Mitchell bombers the group attacked German supply lines in northern Italy, bombing bridges, marshalling yards, and roads. In March, it earned two Distinguished Unit Citations for raids on marshalling yards in Rome and Florence that damaged enemy communications without destroying cultural monuments. For supporting the Allied ground advance in Italy during April, May, and June 1944, the group earned the French Croix de Guerre with Palm. During the summer, it bombed bridges over the Po River in northern Italy using B-25 bombers to block the stream of German supplies and reinforcements going southward. The 319th Bombardment Group supported the invasion of southern France in August 1944 by attacking coastal batteries, radar stations, and bridges. From Corsica, it hit railroad bridges in Northern Italy and late in the year attacked railroad lines through the Brenner Pass that connected Germany and Austria with Italy.

In January 1945, the 319th returned to the United States, where it began to train with Douglas A-26 Invader aircraft for operations in the Pacific Ocean Theater. Between May and July 1945, the group moved by ship to Okinawa, and on 16 July flew its first mission against Japan. From then until the end of the fighting in early August, the 319th attacked enemy targets such as airfields and industrial centers on Kyūshū and occupied Shanghai area of China, and shipping around the Ryukyu Islands and in the East China Sea. In November and December 1945, the group returned to the United States.

=== Air Force reserve ===
==== Initial activation and mobilization for the Korean War ====
The group was activated again in the reserve under Air Defense Command (ADC) at Mitchel Field, New York in December 1946, although as a headquarters only, with no squadrons assigned. Its four World War II squadrons had all been allotted to the National Guard, and it was not until April 1947 that it was assigned squadrons, the 46th Bombardment Squadron, a newly constituted unit, (Note: The World War II 46th Bombardment Squadron had become the 22d Antisubmarine Squadron and was then disbanded. Maurer, Combat Squadrons, pp. 114–115.) and the 50th Bombardment Squadron, which had been disbanded during the war. The group was filled out in July 1947, when two more disbanded squadrons, the 51st and 59th Bombardment Squadrons, were reconstituted and assigned to the group.

At Mitchel, the group trained under the supervision of the 113th AAF Base Unit (later the 2230 Air Force Reserve Training Center), although it is not clear whether any of its elements were fully manned or equipped during this period. In July 1948 Continental Air Command (ConAC) assumed responsibility for managing reserve and Air National Guard units from ADC. The 319th's stay at Mitchel ended when ConAC reorganized its reserve units under the wing base organization system in June 1949. President Truman's reduced 1949 defense budget also required reductions in the number of groups in the Air Force to 49. and group was replaced as the reserve flying unit at Mitchel by the 84th Fighter Group, a corollary reserve unit integrated with the active duty 52d Fighter Wing.

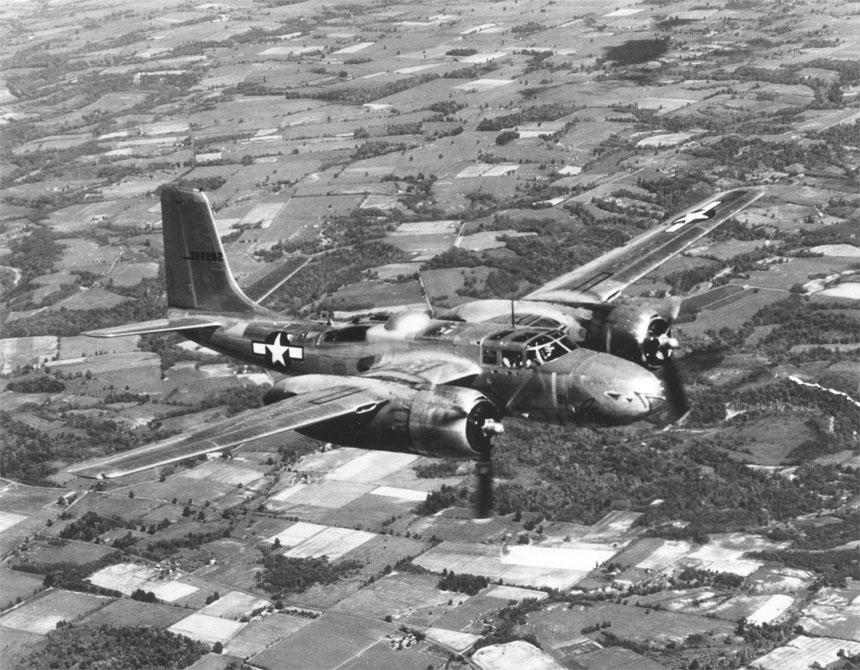
A-26 Invader in flight

The group moved on paper to Reading Municipal Airport, Pennsylvania, where it replaced the 322d Bombardment Group. Under the new organizational model, it became part of the 319th Bombardment Wing. At Reading the group trained under the supervision of the 2237th Air Force Reserve Training Center. Although the group was assigned four squadrons rather than the three of active duty units, they were manned at 25% of normal strength. Runway length at Reading, however, led ConAC to decide to station a troop carrier unit there, and the group was inactivated on 2 October 1949 and its equipment and personnel were transferred to the 512th Troop Carrier Group.

The group activated again about a month later, on 10 October 1949 at Birmingham Municipal Airport, Alabama, where it replaced the 514th Troop Carrier Group. Training at Birmingham was conducted by the 2587th Air Force Reserve Training Center. All reserve combat and corollary units were mobilized for the Korean war, and the 319th was called up on 10 March 1951. Its personnel and aircraft were used as fillers for other units, and the group was inactivated on 22 March.

==== Fighter operations ====
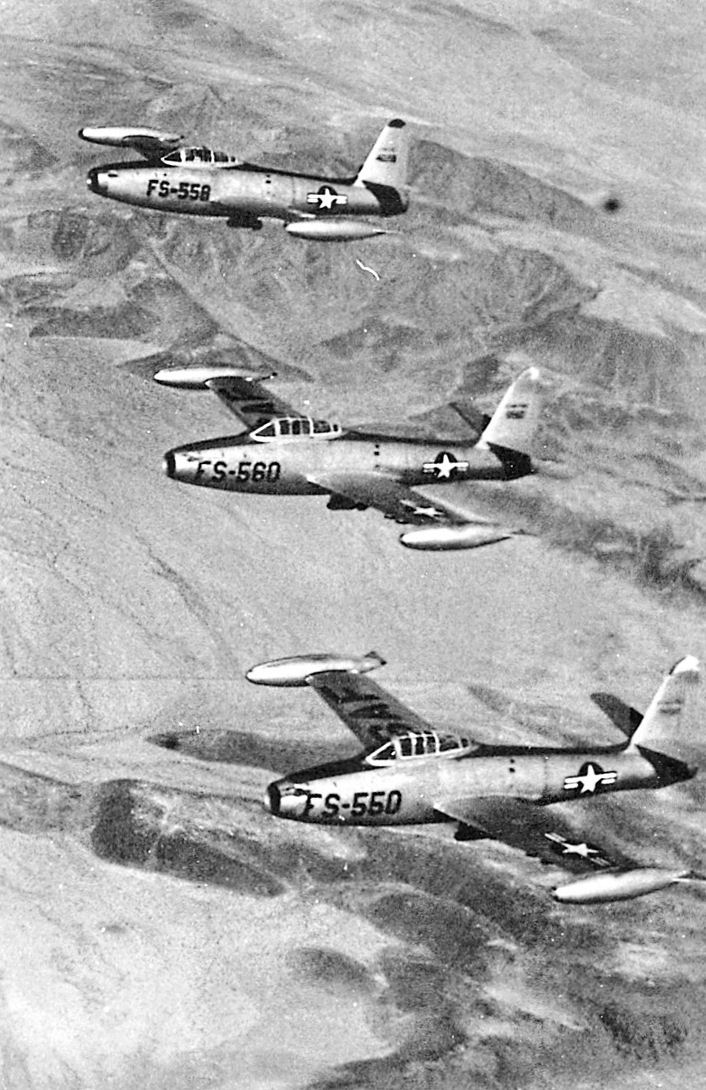
F-84s as flown by the group

The reserve mobilization for the Korean War had left the reserve without aircraft, and reserve units did not receive aircraft until July 1952. The Air Force desired that all reserve units be designed to augment the regular forces in the event of a national emergency. The six reserve pilot training wings, including the 8710th Pilot Training Wing at Memphis Municipal Airport, Tennessee, had no mobilization mission. On 18 May 1955, the 8710th was discontinued and replaced by the 319th Fighter-Bomber Wing. The group, redesignated the 319th Fighter-Bomber Group, was activated as the wing's flying headquarters, with the 46th Fighter-Bomber Squadron as its only component. The group flew Republic F-84 Thunderjets until 1957, when it began to receive North American F-86 Sabres. Despite its designation as a fighter bomber group, its mission initially was in the air defense role and it was gained by ADC upon mobilization. Later the group assumed a tactical fighter role. In 1957, the 50th Fighter-Bomber Squadron was added to the group, although it was located at New Orleans Naval Air Station, under what was termed the Detached Squadron Concept.

Meanwhile, the Joint Chiefs of Staff were pressuring the Air Force to provide more wartime airlift. At the same time, about 150 Fairchild C-119 Flying Boxcars became available from the active force. Consequently, in November 1956 the Air Force directed ConAC to convert three reserve fighter bomber wings to the troop carrier mission by September 1957. In addition, within the Air Staff was a recommendation that the reserve fighter mission given to the Air National Guard and replaced by the troop carrier mission. Cuts in the budget in 1957 also led to a reduction in the number of reserve wings from 24 to 15. The 319th Fighter-Bomber Wing and its support elements were inactivated on 16 November 1957 in this reduction of reserve wings. Although the 319th Group was also inactivated that day, its place was taken by the 445th Troop Carrier Group.

=== Reactivation at Grand Forks ===
==== Bomber operations ====
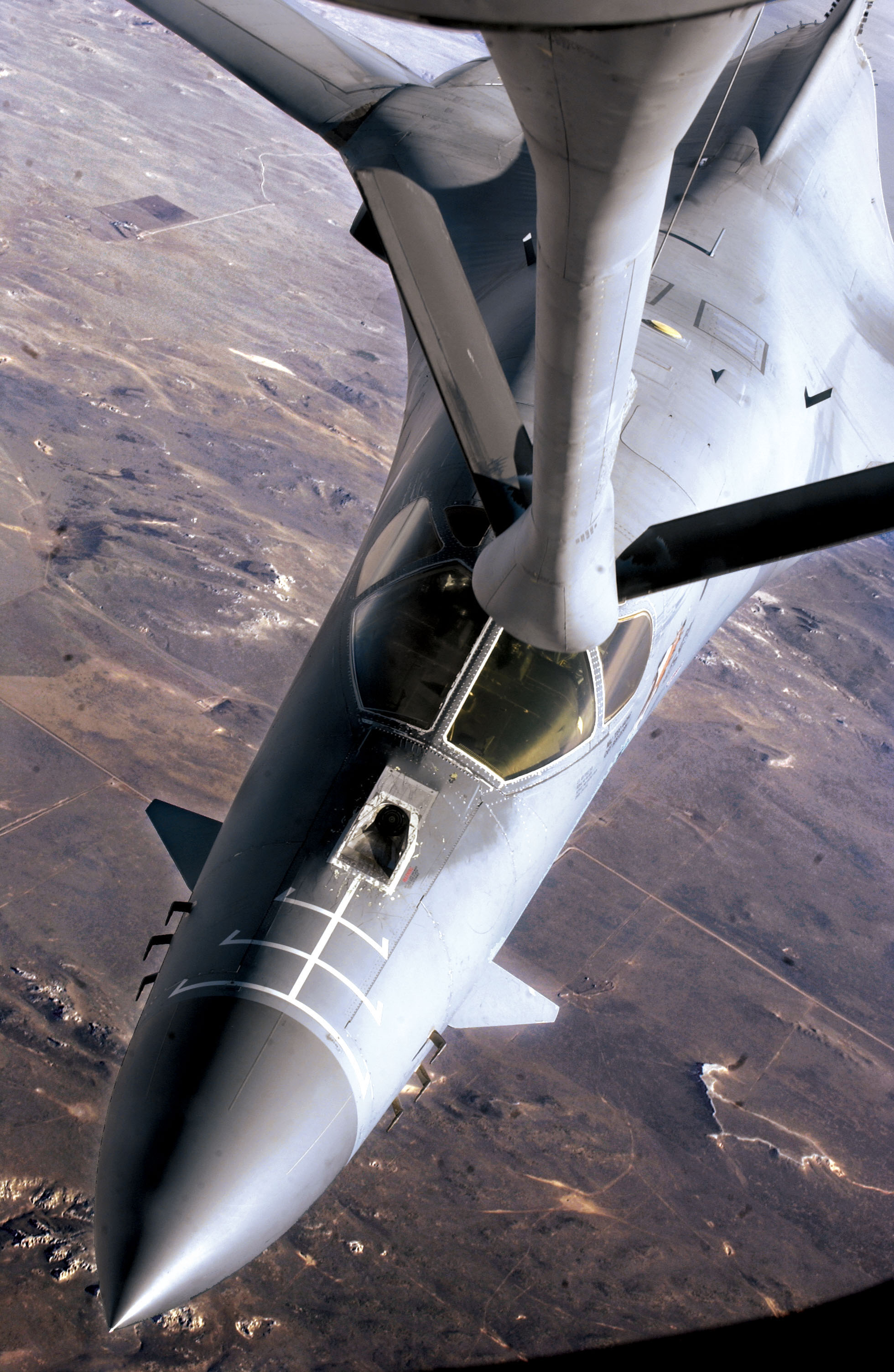
B-1 Lancer from the 319th refueling

The group was reactivated at Grand Forks Air Force Base, North Dakota in on 1 September 1991 as the 319th Operations Group when Strategic Air Command (SAC) implemented the Objective Wing organization for its units. The group was assigned to the 319th Wing and was assigned the 46th Bomb Squadron, flying the Rockwell B-1B Lancer, the 905th Air Refueling Squadron, flying the Boeing KC-135 Stratotanker and the 319th Operations Support Squadron. Shortly after the group was activated, President George H. W. Bush directed on 28 September that the group no longer keep half of its aircraft on nuclear alert and the group began to focus on training for conventional bombing missions. This became the group's primary mission in February 1993.

In July 1992, the Air Force reorganized its combat commands. SAC's The bomber mission and the 319th Wing were assigned to Air Combat Command (ACC), while the air refueling mission was assigned to Air Mobility Command (AMC). In this reorganization, the 905th Air Refueling Squadron was reassigned from the group, although it remained at Grand Forks. In late February and March 1992, the group set a dozen world time-to-climb records to various altitudes with its Lancer aircraft. However, the transfer of the air refueling mission required a major realignment of the tanker force and by 1994, the Air Force decided that Grand Forks was to become one of three "super tanker" bases. On 1 October 1993, the 319th transferred from ACC to AMC. It regained the 905th Air Refueling Squadron, but the 46th Bomb Squadron was transferred to the 319th Bomb Group. (Note: The 319th Bomb Group was a new organization, and not related to the 319th Operations Group, despite the similarity of its name to 319th Bombardment Group.)

==== Air refueling operations ====
In 1994, the 319th gained the 906th, 911th and 912th Air Refueling Squadrons equipped with KC-135R and KC-135T aircraft. In its first active years, the group deployed aircrews and aircraft to support Operation Provide Comfort, humanitarian relief to Kurds fleeing Iraq to in Turkey; Operation Southern Watch, enforcing the no fly zone in southern Iraq; Operation Vigilant Warrior, the deployment of forces to Saudi Arabia to counter threats from Iraq; Operation Deny Flight, enforcing the no-fly zone in Bosnia Herzegovina; Operation Uphold Democracy, the removal of a military junta in Haiti; and Operation Constant Vigil, counter-drug operations based in Panama.

Toward the end of 1998 and into 1999, the group deployed resources to the Persian Gulf and Europe in support of Operation Desert Fox, attacks on Iraqi WMD sites for failing to comply with United Nations mandates; and Operation Allied Force, operations in Kosovo against Serbia. During the summer of 2000, the group operated from MacDill Air Force Base, Florida as major repairs were made to the runways at Grand Forks. From MacDill, the 319th continued to deploy for Operations Northern and Southern Watch and also Operation Joint Forge in Bosnia Herzegovina, operating from Istres-Le Tubé Air Base, France. Following the 9/11 attacks, the group stood up a quick reaction alert force to support homeland defense in Operation Noble Eagle, and deployed resources for Operation Enduring Freedom.

The group's deployments included deployments in which it was the primary force provider for expeditionary operations. In those cases, a 319th Air Expeditionary Group was activated as a provisional unit, deployed to a makeshift tent city somewhere in the arid desert of Southwest Asia. From the start of air operations over Afghanistan 7 October, by 2 November 2001 the 319th Air Expeditionary Group ad flown over 150 sorties and more than 1050 hours; pumping over 1.4 million US gallons (5,300 m^{3}) of gas into more than 450 planes. The expeditionary group includes not only operational, but maintenance organizations. Its deployment location was not officially identified, but is likely to have been Masirah Air Base, where the RAF and USAF have long had facilities.

The group began to diminish in size in June 2007, when the 911th Air Refueling Squadron inactivated. The 906th Squadron followed on 2 October 2009, and the 912th on 1 October 2010. The group's first refueling squadron, the 905th, was the last operational squadron of the group. The wing frequently deployed elements to Southwest Asia, occasionally being the major force provider for the 319th Air Expeditionary Group. They both inactivated on 31 December 2010, as manned flying operations ended at Grand Forks.

== Lineage ==
- Established as the 319th Bombardment Group (Medium) on 19 June 1942

Activated on 26 June 1942
Redesignated 319th Bombardment Group, Medium on 20 August 1943
Redesignated 319th Bombardment Group, Light on 3 February 1945
Inactivated on 18 December 1945

- Activated in the reserve on 27 December 1946

Inactivated on 2 September 1949

- Activated in the Reserve on 10 October 1949

Ordered to active duty on 10 March 1951
Inactivated on 22 March 1951

- Redesignated 319th Fighter-Bomber Group on 12 April 1955

Activated in the reserve on 18 May 1955
Inactivated on 16 November 1957

- Redesignated 319th Bombardment Group, Heavy on 31 July 1985 (remained inactive)
- Redesignated 319th Operations Group on 29 August 1991

Activated on 1 September 1991
Inactivated on 31 December 2010
Reactivated in 2019

=== Assignments ===
- III Bomber Command, 26 June 1942
- Eighth Air Force, September 1942
- XII Bomber Command, November 1942
- 47th Bombardment Wing, attached c. February 19431 June 1943
- 2686 Medium Bombardment Wing (Provisional), 7 June 1943
- 42d Bombardment Wing, Medium, 24 August 1943
- 57th Bombardment Wing, Medium, 10 November 1944
- Third Air Force, January 1945
- First Air Force, 1 February 1945
- VII Bomber Command, July 1945–18 December 1945
- First Air Force, 27 December 1946
- 4th Bombardment Wing (later 4th Air Division), 17 October 1947
- 319th Bombardment Wing, 27 June–2 September 1949
- 319th Bombardment Wing, 10 October 1949 – 22 March 1951
- 319th Fighter-Bomber Wing, 18 May 1955 – 16 November 1957
- 319th Wing (later 319th Bomb Wing, 319th Air Refueling) Wing, 1 September 1991 – 31 December 2010
- 319th Reconnaissance Wing, 28 June 2019 - present

=== Components ===
- 4th Reconnaissance Squadron: 23 July 2020 – present
- 7th Reconnaissance Squadron: 28 June 2019 - present
- 12th Reconnaissance Squadron: 28 June 2019 - present
- 18th Airborne Command and Control Squadron: 10 February 2023 - 1 May 2025
- 46th Bombardment Squadron (later 46th Fighter-Bomber Squadron, 46th Bomb Squadron): 16 April 1947 – 2 September 1949; 10 October 1949 – 22 March 1951; 18 May 1955 – 16 November 1957; 1 September 1991 – 1 October 1993
- 50th Bombardment Squadron (later 50th Fighter-Bomber Squadron): 16 April 1947 – 2 September 1949; 10 October 1949 – 22 March 1951; 8 June–18 November 1957
- 51st Bombardment Squadron: 8 July 1947 – 2 September 1949; 10 October 1949 – 22 March 1951
- 59th Bombardment Squadron: 8 July 1947 – 2 September 1949; 10 October 1949 – 22 March 1951
- 348th Reconnaissance Squadron: 28 June 2019 – present
- 437th Bombardment Squadron: 26 June 1942 – 18 December 1945
- 438th Bombardment Squadron: 26 June 1942 – 13 December 1945
- 439th Bombardment Squadron: 26 June 1942 – 18 December 1945
- 440th Bombardment Squadron: 26 June 1942 – 18 December 1945
- 472d Electronic Combat Squadron: 1 May 2025 - present
- 905th Air Refueling Squadron: 1 September 1991 – 1 June 1992; 1 October 1993 – 31 December 2010
- 906th Air Refueling Squadron: 30 January 1994 – 2 October 2009
- 911th Air Refueling Squadron: 29 April 1994 – 30 June 2007
- 912th Air Refueling Squadron: 1 April 1994 – 1 October 2010

=== Stations ===
- Barksdale Field, Louisiana, 26 June 1942
- Harding Field, Louisiana, 8–27 August 1942
- RAF Shipdham (AAF Station 115), England, 12 September 1942
- RAF Horsham St Faith (AAF Station 123), England, c. 4 October 1942
- Saint-Leu Airfield, Algeria, c. 11 November 1942
- Oran Tafaraoui Airport, Algeria, 18 November 1942
- Maison Blanche Airport, Algeria, 24 November 1942
- Telergma Airfield, Algeria, c. 12 December 1942
- Oujda Airfield, French Morocco, 3 March 1943
- Rabat-Salé Airport, French Morocco, 25 April 1943
- Sedrata Airfield, Algeria, 1 June 1943
- Djedeida Airfield, Tunisia, 26 June 1943
- Decimomannu Airfield, Sardinia, c. 1 November 1943
- Serragia Airfield, Corsica, c. 21 September 1944 – 1 January 1945
- Bradley Field, Connecticut, 25 January 1945
- Columbia Army Air Base, South Carolina, c. 28 February–27 April 1945
- Kadena Airfield, Okinawa, c. 2 July 1945
- Machinato Airfield, Okinawa, 21 July–21 November 1945
- Fort Lewis, Washington, 17–18 December 1945
- Mitchel Field, New York, 27 December 1946
- Reading Municipal Airport, Pennsylvania, 27 June–2 September 1949
- Birmingham Municipal Airport, Alabama, 10 October 1949 – 22 March 1951
- Memphis Municipal Airport, Tennessee, 18 May 1955 – 16 November 1957
- Grand Forks Air Force Base, North Dakota, 1 September 1991 – present

=== Aircraft ===
- Martin B-26 Marauder, 1942–1944
- North American B-25 Mitchell, 1944
- Douglas A-26 Invader, 1945, by 1949–1951
- North American T-6 Texan, by 1949–1951
- Beechcraft T-7 Navigator, by 1949–1951
- Beechcraft T-11 Kansan, by 1949–1951
- Lockheed T-33 T-Bird, 1955–1957
- Republic F-84 Thunderjet, 1955–1957
- North American F-86 Sabre, 1955–1957
- Rockwell B-1B Lancer, 1991–1993
- Beechcraft C-12 Huron 1991–1995
- Boeing KC-135 Stratotanker, 1991–1992, 1993–2010
- Northrop Grumman RQ-4 Global Hawk, 2019-present

== See also ==
- List of Martin B-26 Marauder operators
- 514th Air Service Group World War II support organization for the group
