= 173rd Fighter Wing =

173d Fighter Wing

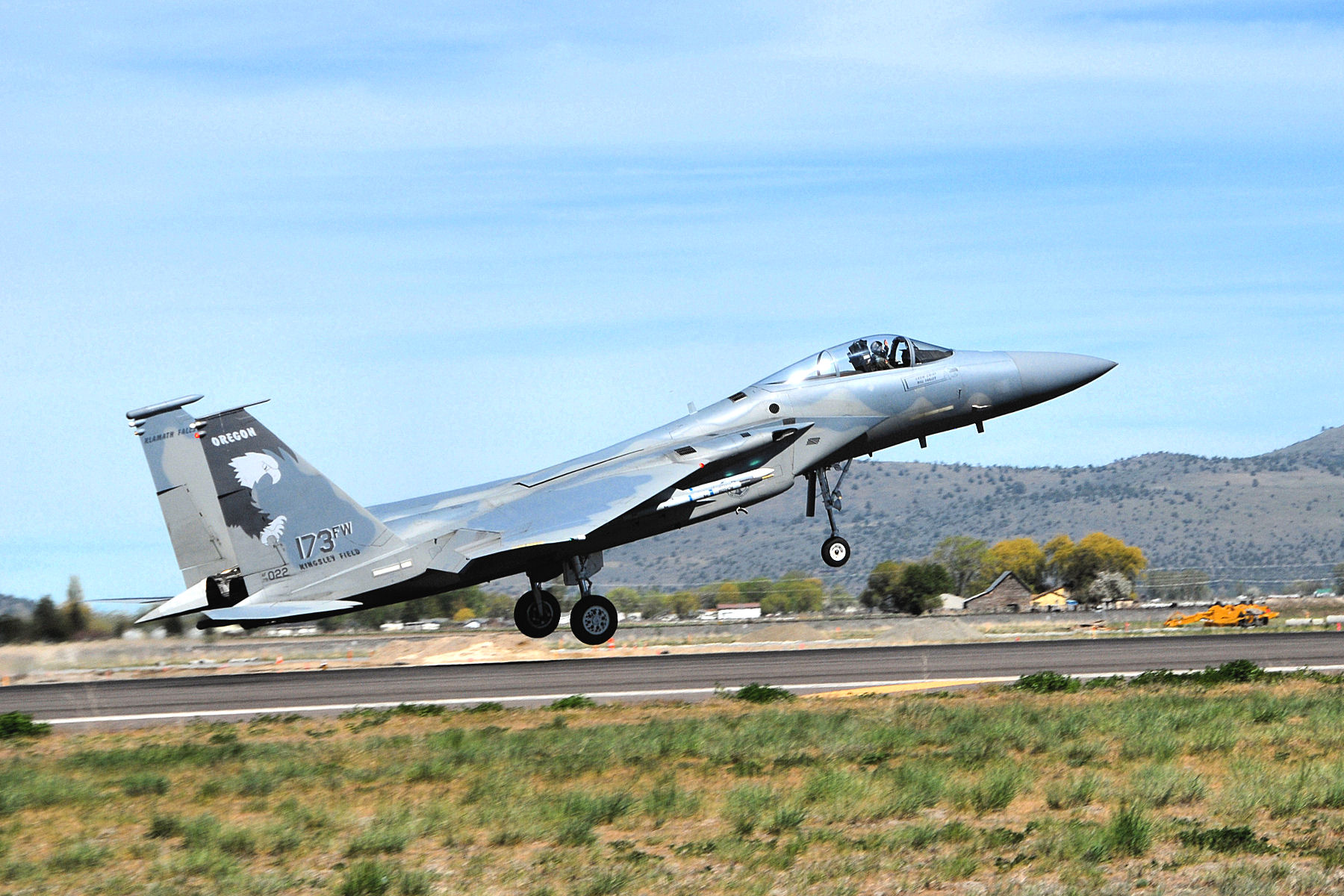
- 173d Fighter Wing F-15C Eagle (Note: Aircraft is F-15C-24-MC Eagle, serial 79-0022.)
- Active: 1996-present
- Country: United States
- Allegiance: Oregon
- Branch: Air National Guard
- Type: Wing
- Role: Fighter/Air Defense
- Part of: Oregon Air National Guard
- Garrison/HQ: Kingsley Field Air National Guard Base, Klamath Falls, Oregon
- Motto: Land of No Slack
- Tail code: "Oregon" American bald eagle
- Website: https://www.173fw.ang.af.mil/

Insignia
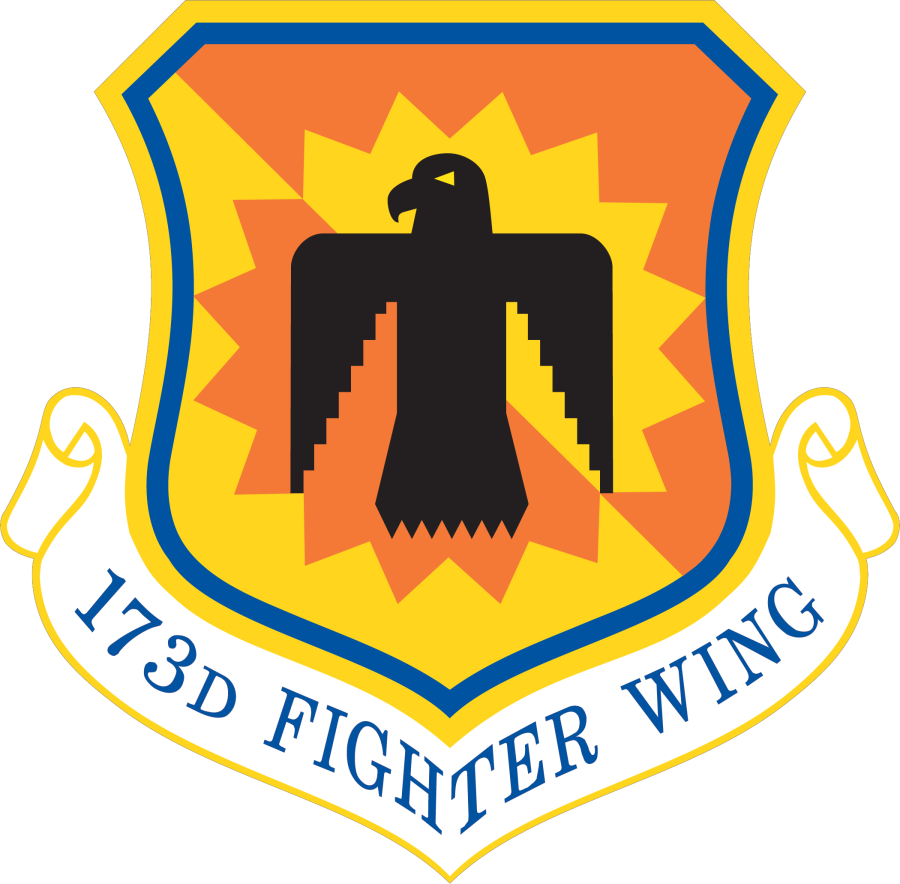
- 173rd Fighter Wing emblem

The 173rd Fighter Wing (173 FW) is a unit of the Oregon Air National Guard, stationed at Kingsley Field Air National Guard Base, Klamath Falls, Oregon. The 173d Fighter Wing is responsible for training combat pilots and support personnel on the McDonnell Douglas F-15 Eagle (C and D models) for the active-duty Air Force and the Air National Guard. If activated to federal service, the wing is gained by the Air Combat Command (ACC) of the United States Air Force.

In addition, as part of the Air National Guard, the 173 FW serves the state of Oregon and the United States in times of peace and war.

== Units ==
- 173d Operations Group

114th Fighter Squadron
270th Air Traffic Control Squadron
173d Operations Support Squadron

- 173d Maintenance Group
- 173d Mission Support Group
- 173d Medical Group

== History ==
On 1 April 1996, the 173d Fighter Wing was formed at Kingsley Field ANGB as a host organization and parent unit for the 114th Fighter Squadron (114 FS) when the unit was authorized to expand, with the 114th being transferred from the 142d Fighter Wing at Portland to the new wing at Kingsley ANGB. The 173d Fighter Wing consists of the 173d Operations Group; 173d Maintenance Group, 173d Mission Support Group and 173d Medical Group.

Initially flying early versions of the F-16 Fighting Falcon aircraft as a formal training unit (FTU), the F-16As and F-16Bs were retired in the late 1990s as their service life was ending. The squadron began receiving F-15A and F-15B Eagles in 1998, upgrading to the F-15C and F-15D Eagle in 2004 as the A and B series aircraft were retired and continuing its mission as a fighter-interceptor training unit for the Air Force and the Air National Guard. Two F-15s were transferred to NASA's Armstrong Flight research center on December 22, 2025, where they will be modified for use with the X-59 programme.

=== Lineage ===
- Designated 173d Fighter Wing, and allotted to Oregon ANG, 1996

Extended federal recognition and activated, 1 April 1996

=== Assignments ===
- Oregon Air National Guard

Gained by: Air Education and Training Command

=== Components ===
- 173d Operations Group, 1 April 1996 – present
  - 114th Fighter Squadron, 1 April 1996 – present

=== Stations ===
- Kingsley Field Air National Guard Base, Oregon, 1 April 1996 – present

=== Aircraft ===
- F-16A/B Fighting Falcon, 1996–1998
- F-15A/B Eagle, 1998–2004
- F-15C/D Eagle, 2004–2025
- F-35A, TBD 2026
