= Djedeida Airfield =

Abandoned World War II military airfield in Tunisia

Djedeida Airfield
- Part of Twelfth Air Force

Site information
- Type: Military airfield
- Controlled by: United States Army Air Forces

Location
- Coordinates: 36°51′44.31″N 009°55′47.06″E

Site history
- Built: prior to 1942
- In use: 1942-1944

Location of Djedeida Airfield, Tunisia

Djedeida Airfield is an airfield in Tunisia, located approximately 10 km east-northeast of El Battan, and 30 km west of Tunis. The airfield was built prior to 1942 and used by the German Luftwaffe. It was raided by elements of the US 1st battalion of the 1st Armored Regiment on 25 November 1942, but the US forces were forced to withdraw due to lack of infantry support. It continued operations under the Germans until seized by the American II Corps on 8 May 1943. After being repaired by Army engineers, it was used by the United States Army Air Force Twelfth Air Force during the North African Campaign. Units known to be assigned to the facility were:

- 17th Bombardment Group, 23 June-1 November 1943, Martin B-26 Marauder
- 319th Bombardment Group, 26 June-1 November 1943, B-26 Marauder
- 27th Fighter Squadron, (1st Fighter Group), 1–29 November 1943, Lockheed P-38 Lightning
- 71st Fighter Squadron, (1st Fighter Group), 31 October-29 November 1943, P-38 Lightning
- 94th Fighter Squadron, (1st Fighter Group), 1–29 November 1943, P-38 Lightning

When the fighters moved out at the end of November, the airfield became a servicing depot of Air Technical Service Command until the end of January 1944 when the Americans left the area. Today in aerial imagery, the airfield looks almost like it did in 1943. The runway, although deteriorated, along with all of the taxiways and aircraft hardstands are very much in evidence. It is unclear what the current use of the facility is.
