= Saint-Leu Airfield =

WWII airfield in Algeria

Saint-Leu Airfield
- Part of Twelfth Air Force

Site information
- Type: Military airfield
- Controlled by: United States Army Air Forces

Location
- Coordinates: 35°48′21.89″N 000°16′05.42″W

Site history
- Built: 1942
- In use: 1942-1943

Location of Saint-Leu Airfield, Algeria

Saint-Leu Airfield was a military airfield in Algeria, near the city of Bettioua, about 45 km northeast of Oran.

During World War II it was held by Vichy France until taken by the Allied Forces in Operation Torch, then was used by the United States Army Air Force Twelfth Air Force 319th Bombardment Group during the North African Campaign against the German Afrika Korps. The 319th flew Martin B-26 Marauder medium bombers from the airfield between 11 and 18 November 1942.
