= 46th Bomb Squadron =

Inactive United States Air Force unit

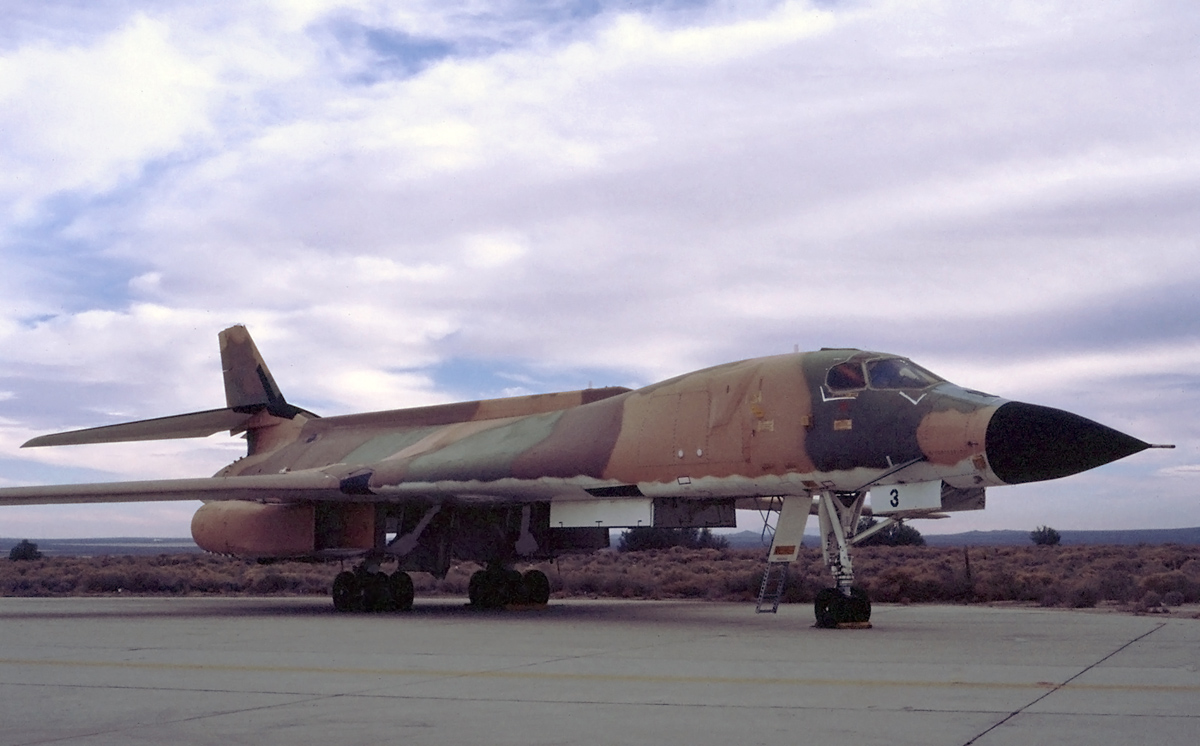
- B-1 Lancer, last aircraft flown by the squadron
- Active: 1947–1949; 1949–1951; 1963–1994
- Country: United States
- Branch: United States Air Force
- Role: Bombardment
- Part of: Strategic Air Command
- Decorations: Air Force Outstanding Unit Award

Insignia
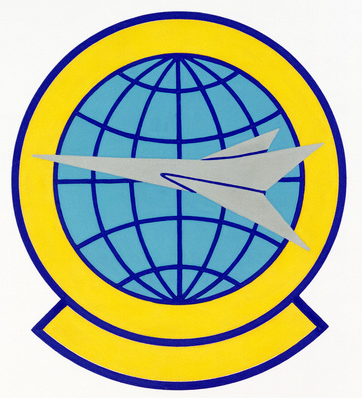
- 46th Bomb Squadron emblem (approved September 1983)

The 46th Bomb Squadron is an inactive United States Air Force unit. It was last assigned to the 319th Operations Group at Grand Forks Air Force Base, North Dakota, where it was inactivated on 16 July 1994.

The squadron was first organized in the reserve in 1947 as the 46th Bombardment Squadron. It was not fully manned before it was mobilized in 1951 and its personnel used as fillers for other units. From May 1955 to November 1957 it served in the reserves as the 46th Fighter-Bomber Squadron, standing air defense alert at its home station, Memphis Municipal Airport, during 1956 and 1957. It was inactivated when the Air Force reserves converted to an all troop carrier command.

From 1963 through the end of the Cold War, the squadron stood nuclear alert. It also deployed aircraft and personnel to Southeast Asia during the Vietnam War.

== History ==
=== Air Force reserve and Korean mobilization ===
The squadron was first established in 1947 at Mitchel Field, New York in the reserve, as a light bomber squadron and assigned to the 319th Bombardment Group. (Note: All four of the squadrons assigned to the 319th Bombardment Group during World War II had been allotted to the National Guard in 1946. Maurer, Combat Squadrons, pp. 541–544. When the 319th Group was reformed in the reserve in 1947, it was assigned 3 disbanded squadrons formerly assigned to the 46th and 25th Bombardment Groups and the new 46th Bombardment Squadron. Maurer, Combat Squadrons, pp. 215, 217, 232–233) It does not appear that the squadron was fully manned or equipped at Mitchel, where the squadron trained under the supervision of the 113th AAF Base Unit (later the 2230th Air Force Reserve Training Center) of Air Defense Command. In June 1949, Continental Air Command, which had taken over reserve training in July 1948, reorganized its reserve flying units under the wing base organization system and the squadron moved to Reading Municipal Airport, where the 319th Bombardment Wing was formed to replace the 322d Bombardment Group. However, the reserve program changed and Reading became a troop carrier base, as the squadron inactivated on 2 September 1949, along with other elements of the 319th Wing and transferred its assets to the new 512th Troop Carrier Wing.

The squadron remained inactive for little more than a month, and was reactivated at Birmingham Municipal Airport, Alabama on 10 October, where it assumed the personnel and some of the equipment of the 335th Troop Carrier Squadron when the 319th Wing was activated to replace the 514th Troop Carrier Wing there. The squadron began training with the assistance of the 2587th Air Force Reserve Training Center, flying Douglas B-26 Invaders and a variety of trainers. During this time the squadron was manned at only 25% of its normal strength. All reserve combat units were mobilized for the Korean war. The squadron was part of the second wave of reserve mobilization, mobilizing on 10 March 1951. Its personnel were used as fillers for other units and the squadron was inactivated on 22 March 1951.

=== Reserve fighter operations ===
The reserve mobilization for the Korean War left the reserve without aircraft, and reserve units did not receive aircraft until July 1952. Among the new reserve flying organizations formed in 1952 was the 8710th Pilot Training Wing (Multi-engine) at Memphis Municipal Airport, Tennessee, which replaced the 905th Reserve Training Wing on 13 June. However, the Air Force decided that all reserve units be designed to augment the regular forces in the event of a national emergency, and the six reserve pilot training wings had no mobilization mission. On 18 May 1955, the 8710th was discontinued and replaced by the 319th, now a fighter bomber unit. The 46th Fighter-Bomber Squadron was the 319th's sole operational squadron at this time, and equipped with Lockheed T-33 T-Birds for training reservists on jet fighter operations and Republic F-84 Thunderjets for operational use. Although titled a fighter bomber squadron the squadron initially had an air defense mission, and from July 1956 through August 1957, maintained two Thunderjets on alert at Memphis.

Meanwhile, the Joint Chiefs of Staff were pressuring the Air Force to provide more wartime airlift. About 150 Fairchild C-119 Flying Boxcars became available from the active force as it began to replace them with newer aircraft. Consequently, in November 1956 the Air Force directed Continental Air Command to convert three reserve fighter bomber wings to the troop carrier mission by September 1957. In addition, within the Air Staff was a recommendation that the reserve fighter mission be given to the Air National Guard and replaced in the reserve by the troop carrier mission. Cuts in the budget in 1957 also led to a reduction in the number of reserve wings. These factors combined to lead to the inactivation of the reserve's fighter bomber wings. The 46th was inactivated in November 1957 and its personnel were transferred to elements of the 445th Troop Carrier Group.

=== Strategic Air Command ===
In the late 1950s, Strategic Air Command (SAC) began to disperse its Boeing B-52 Stratofortress bombers over a larger number of bases, thus making it more difficult for the Soviet Union to knock out the entire fleet with a surprise first strike. As part of this program, SAC established the 4133d Strategic Wing at Grand Forks Air Force Base, North Dakota in 1958. In January 1962, its strike squadron, the 30th Bombardment Squadron joined it at Grand Forks, moving from Homestead Air Force Base, Florida.

In February 1963, The 319th Bombardment Wing assumed the aircraft, personnel and equipment of the discontinued 4133d wing. The 4133d was a Major Command controlled (MAJCON) wing, which could not carry a permanent history or lineage, and SAC wanted to replace it with a permanent unit. In this reorganization, the 46th was reactivated as the 46th Bombardment Squadron, and assumed the mission, personnel and equipment of the 30th Squadron, which was simultaneously inactivated. Half the squadron's aircraft were maintained on fifteen minute alert, fully fueled and ready for combat to reduce vulnerability to a Soviet missile strike.

The squadron trained in strategic bombardment and participated in SAC exercises. During the Vietnam War, the squadron deployed aircrews and personnel to forward locations in the Western Pacific, participating in Operation Arc Light, Operation Linebacker I and Operation Linebacker II. In 1982 it transitioned to the B-52G, and remained on nuclear alert until 1987 when the B-52s were sent to storage.

The squadron converted the Rockwell B-1B Lancer in 1987 and flew training missions with conventional and nuclear configurations. It was inactivated in 1994 with the drawdown of USAF strategic forces at the end of the Cold War and the conversion of the 319th Wing to an air refueling unit.

== Lineage ==
- Constituted as the 46th Bombardment Squadron, Light on 1 April 1947

Activated in the reserve on 16 April 1947
Inactivated on 2 September 1949
Activated in the reserve on 10 October 1949
Ordered into active service on 10 March 1951
Inactivated on 22 March 1951

- Redesignated 46th Fighter-Bomber Squadron on 12 April 1955

Activated in the reserve on 18 May 1955
Inactivated on 16 November 1957

- Redesignated 46th Bombardment Squadron, Heavy on 15 November 1962 and activated (not organized)

Organized on 1 February 1963
Redesignated 46th Bomb Squadron on 29 August 1991
Inactivated on 16 July 1994

=== Assignments ===
- 319th Bombardment Group, 1 April 1947 – 2 September 1949
- 319th Bombardment Group, 10 October 1949 – 22 March 1951
- 319th Fighter-Bomber Group, 18 May 1955 – 16 November 1957
- Strategic Air Command. 15 November 1962 (not organized)
- 319th Bombardment Wing, 1 February 1963
- 319th Operations Group, 1 September 1991
- 319th Bombardment Group, 1 October 1993 – 16 July 1994 (Note: This group is not related to the 319th Bombardment Group of World War II. It was formed in 1993 when the 319th Wing became the 319th Air Refueling Wing and, along with the 319th Operations Group, transferred to Air Mobility Command. This 319th Bombardment Group was formed to command the remaining Air Combat Command forces at Grand Forks.)

=== Stations ===
- Mitchel Field, New York, 1 April 1947
- Reading Municipal Airport, Pennsylvania, 27 June-2 September 1949
- Birmingham Municipal Airport, Alabama, 10 October 1949 – 22 March 1951
- Memphis Municipal Airport, Tennessee, 18 May 1955 – 16 November 1957
- Grand Forks Air Force Base, North Dakota, 1 February 1963 – 16 July 1994

=== Aircraft ===
- North American T-6 Texan, 1949–1951
- Beechcraft T-7 Navigator, 1949–1951
- Beechcraft T-11 Kansan, 1949–1951
- Douglas B-26 Invader, 1949–1951
- Lockheed T-33 T-Bird, 1955–1957
- Republic F-84 Thunderjet, 1955–1957
- North American F-86 Sabre, 1957
- Boeing B-52 Stratofortress, 1962–1987
- Rockwell B-1B Lancer, 1987–1994

== See also ==
- List of B-1 units of the United States Air Force
- List of B-52 Units of the United States Air Force
- List of Douglas A-26 Invader operators
- List of Sabre and Fury units in the US military
- List of United States Air Force fighter squadrons

== Bibliography ==
- Cantwell, Gerald T. (1997). Citizen Airmen: a History of the Air Force Reserve, 1946–1994. Washington, D.C.: Air Force History and Museums Program. ISBN 0-16049-269-6.
- Maurer, Maurer, ed. (1983) [1961]. Air Force Combat Units of World War II (PDF) (reprint ed.). Washington, DC: Office of Air Force History. ISBN 0-912799-02-1. LCCN 61060979. Archived from the original (PDF) on 20 December 2016.
- Maurer, Maurer, ed. (1982) [1969]. Combat Squadrons of the Air Force, World War II (PDF) (reprint ed.). Washington, DC: Office of Air Force History. ISBN 0-405-12194-6. LCCN 70605402. OCLC 72556. Archived from the original (PDF) on 20 December 2016.
- Mueller, Robert (1989). Air Force Bases, Vol. I, Active Air Force Bases Within the United States of America on 17 September 1982 (PDF). Washington, DC: Office of Air Force History. ISBN 0-912799-53-6.
- Ravenstein, Charles A. (1984). Air Force Combat Wings, Lineage & Honors Histories 1947–1977. Washington, DC: Office of Air Force History. ISBN 0-912799-12-9.
- Ravenstein, Charles A. (1984). A Guide to Air Force Lineage and Honors (2d, Revised ed.). Maxwell AFB, AL: USAF Historical Research Center.
