= Willmar Air Force Station =

Willmar Air Force Station
- Part of Air Defense Command (ADC)

Site information
- Type: Air Force Station
- Controlled by: United States Air Force

Location
- Location of Willmar AFS, Minnesota
- Coordinates: 45°08′19″N 095°04′25″W

Site history
- Built: 1956
- In use: 1956-1961

Garrison information
- Garrison: 721st Aircraft Control and Warning Squadron

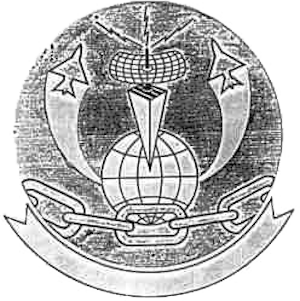
Emblem of the 721st Radar Squadron

Willmar Air Force Station (ADC ID: SM-139) is a closed United States Air Force General Surveillance Radar station. It is located 5.3 miles (8.5 km) northwest of Willmar, Minnesota. It was closed in 1961.

== History ==
Willmar Air Force Station was initially part of Phase II of the Air Defense Command Mobile Radar program. The Air Force approved this expansion of the Mobile Radar program on 23 October 1952. Radars in this network were designated "SM."

The station became operational on 1 July 1956 when the 721st Aircraft Control and Warning Squadron was moved to the station by the 31st Air Division. This site became operational in 1957 with the 721st AC&W Squadron operating a variety of radars including AN/FPS-6, AN/FPS-8, AN/MPS-7, and AN/FPS-3 sets, and initially the station functioned as a Ground-Control Intercept (GCI) and warning station. As a GCI station, the squadron's role was to guide interceptor aircraft toward unidentified intruders picked up on the unit's radar scopes.

During 1959 Willmar AFS joined the Semi Automatic Ground Environment (SAGE) system, initially feeding data to DC-11 at Grand Forks AFB, North Dakota. After joining, the squadron was re-designated as the 721st Radar Squadron (SAGE) on 15 January 1960. The radar squadron provided information 24/7 the SAGE Direction Center where it was analyzed to determine range, direction altitude speed and whether or not aircraft were friendly or hostile.

The station closed on 1 June 1961 due to budgetary constraints. Today the former Willmar Air Force Station is now Willmar Technical College. Mostly rebuilt, some USAF buildings remain.

== Air Force units and assignments ==
Units:

- 721st Aircraft Control and Warning Squadron, Assigned on 1 July 1956

Activated at 31st AD, Snelling AFS, Minnesota on 8 April 1956 (not manned or equipped)

Re-designated 721st Radar Squadron (SAGE), 15 January 1960
Discontinued on 1 June 1961

Assignments:

- 31st Air Division, 1 July 1956
- 29th Air Division, 1 January 1959
- Grand Forks Air Defense Sector, 1 April 1959 – 1 June 1961

== See also ==
- List of USAF Aerospace Defense Command General Surveillance Radar Stations
