= 478th Aeronautical Systems Wing =

478th Aeronautical Systems Wing

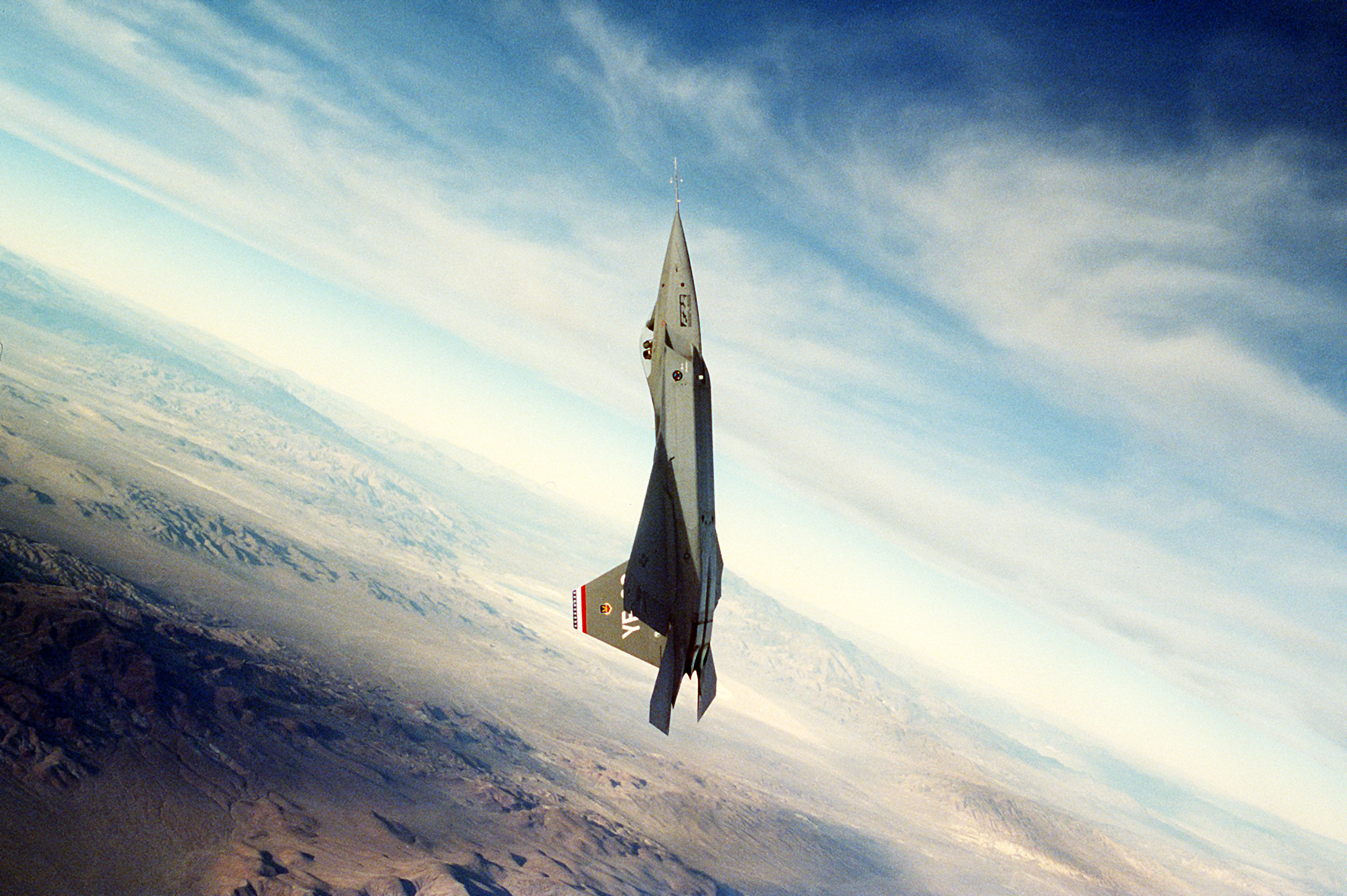
- YF-22 during a test flight
- Active: 1943-1944; 1957-1963; 2007-2009
- Country: United States
- Branch: United States Air Force
- Type: Aeronautical Systems
- Role: Systems Development
- Part of: Air Force Materiel Command

Commanders
- Notable commanders: Lt Gen C. D. Moore

Insignia
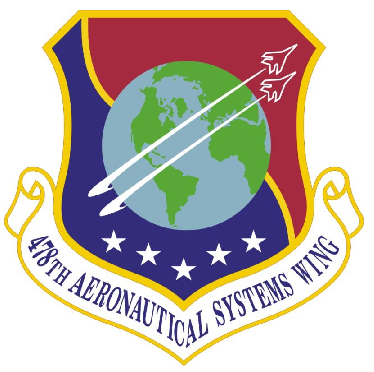
- 478th Aeronautical Systems Wing emblem

The 478th Aeronautical Systems Wing is an inactive wing of the United States Air Force. It was last based at Wright-Patterson Air Force Base, Ohio, where it was inactivated in 2009. The wing was first organized as the 478th Fighter Group (Two Engine), which briefly served as a Fourth Air Force Replacement Training Unit in 1944. The unit was disbanded when the Army Air Forces reorganized its training units into AAF Base Units to reduce manpower requirements in the United States.

The 478th Fighter Group (Air Defense) opened Grand Forks Air Force Base, North Dakota under Air Defense Command in 1957 and managed its expansion as an air defense and strategic bombardment base. In 1960, the group also assumed an alert commitment when it gained the 18th Fighter-Interceptor Squadron. In April 1961, the group was replaced by the 478th Fighter Wing as its responsibilities expanded to host a Strategic Air Command (SAC) wing. SAC activities at Grand Forks continued to expand with the planned addition of a strategic missile wing. In 1963 SAC took over host responsibilities for the base and the wing was inactivated.

In 1985 the 478th Group and 478th Wing were consolidated into a single unit. In the spring of 2007, the consolidated unit was redesignated the 478th Aeronautical Systems Wing and activated with three subordinate groups as a systems development unit at Wright-Patterson Air Force Base. Ohio. In 2009 the wing was inactivated along with two of its groups and its functions transferred to its subordinate 478th Aeronautical Systems Group.

== History ==
=== World War II ===
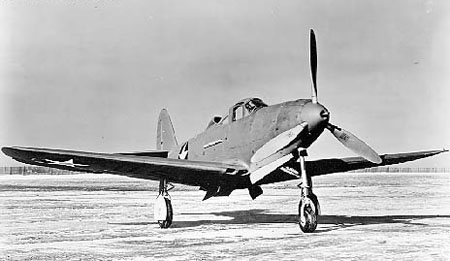
Bell P-39 Airacobra

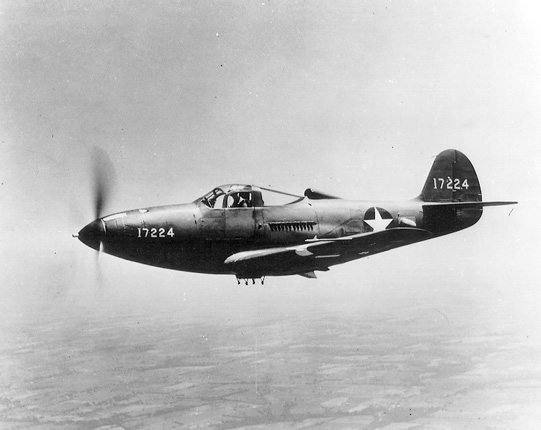
Bell P-39 Airacobra

The wing was first activated in late 1943 as the 478th Fighter Group (Two Engine) at Hamilton Field, California. Its original squadrons were the 454th, 544th, 545th and 546th Fighter Squadrons. The group drew its cadre from the 328th Fighter Group.

The group moved twice in the first two months of its existence, to Santa Rosa Army Air Field in December 1943, then to Redmond Army Air Field in February 1944. Starting in January its component squadrons dispersed to separate bases in California, Oregon, and Washington.

The group experienced delays and was not fully manned or equipped until March 1944, when it began operations as a Replacement Training Unit (RTU) using single engine Bell P-39 Airacobras despite its designation as a two engine unit. RTUs were oversized units whose mission was to train individual pilots or aircrews. The group's 454th Fighter Squadron did not equip as an operational squadron, but served as an administrative unit that processed fighter pilots before they were assigned to RTUs. This squadron was detached from the group in January 1944.

However, the Army Air Forces found that standard military units, based on relatively inflexible tables of organization were proving poorly adapted to the training mission. Accordingly, a more functional system was adopted in which each base was organized into a separate numbered unit, while the groups and squadrons acting as RTUs were disbanded or inactivated. The 478th was disbanded at the end of the month in this reorganization.

The group's squadrons at Redmond and at Madras Army Air Field moved to Portland Army Air Base, where they were replaced by the 432d AAF Base Unit (Fighter Replacement Training Unit, Single Engine). The personnel and equipment of the 454th squadron at Salinas Army Air Base became part of the 451st AAF Base Unit (Night Fighter Replacement Training Unit) and those of the squadron at Paine Field were absorbed by the 465th AAF Base Unit. The 478th headquarters provided the cadre for the 317th Wing (P-39) which managed all P-39 training for Fourth Air Force. (Note: The 317th wing headquarters was also a Base Unit, the 401st, rather than a table of organization unit. See "Abstract, History 317th Troop Carrier Wing May 1944-Sep 1945". Air Force History Index.. The 317th moved to Portland upon organization.)

=== Cold War Air Defense ===
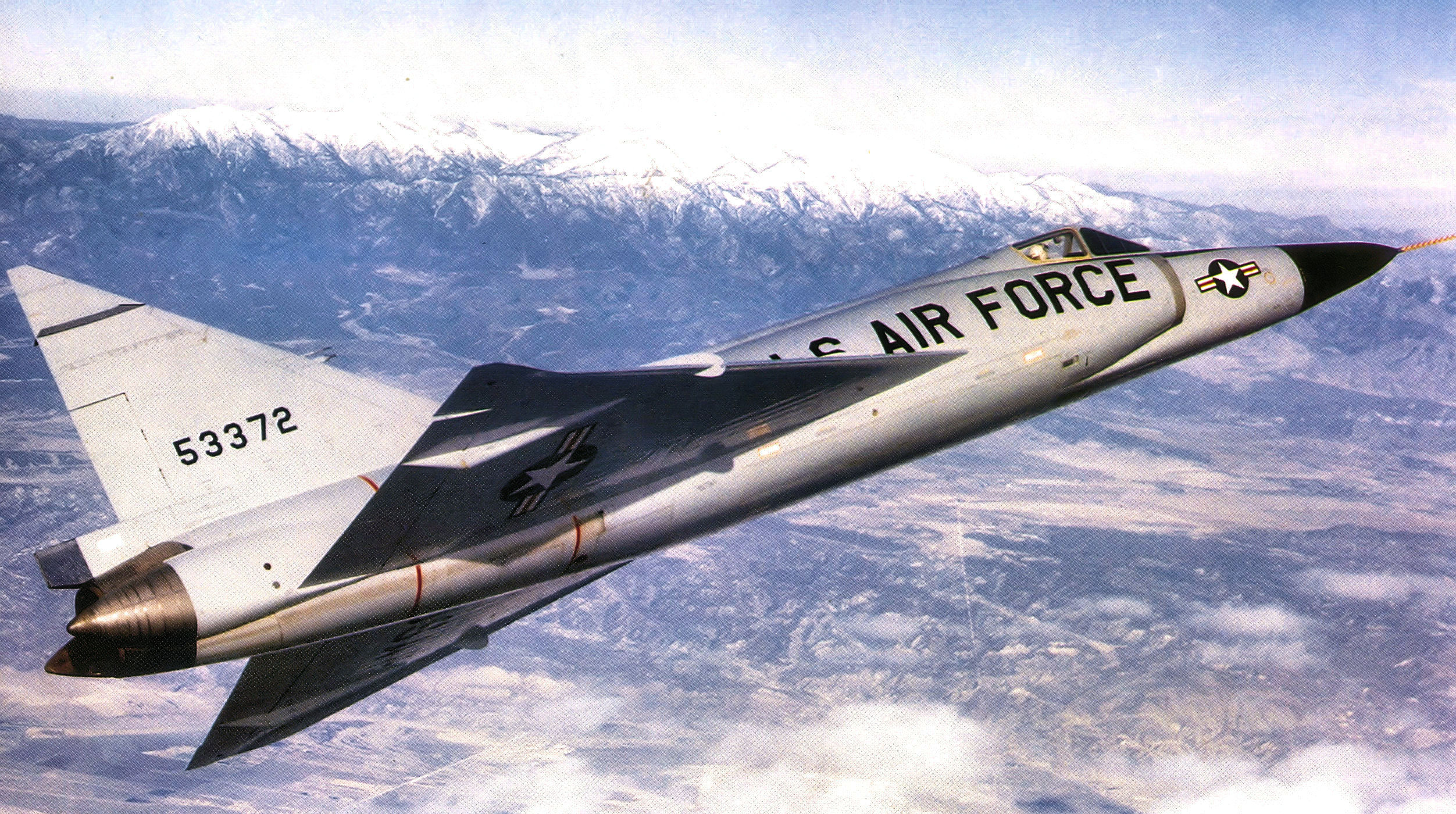
Convair F-102 (Note: Aircraft is F-102A-41-CO Delta Dagger serial 55-3372)

The unit was reconstituted at the end of 1956 and redesignated the 478th Fighter Group (Air Defense). It was activated at Grand Forks Air Force Base in February 1957, but had no tactical units assigned. The group mission was to build up Grand Forks Air Force Base, North Dakota. It was initially assigned an air base squadron and a materiel squadron to carry out this mission.

The Air Force had announced plans to build a base in eastern North Dakota for the air defense of the United States, and Grand Forks had been selected by the Department of Defense. By the end of 1957 the group had managed the completion of the first runway, fighter base facilities, fuel storage and refueling facilities, a control tower and operations facility.

The group's first tenant, the Grand Forks Air Defense Sector was activated in December, and its Semi-Automatic Ground Environment Direction Center (DC-11) was accepted for operation in March 1958. The Air Force had announced the additional expansion of Grand Forks to support Strategic Air Command (SAC) bombers and tankers and in September 1958 SAC activated the 4133d Strategic Wing to serve as the headquarters for this future expansion.

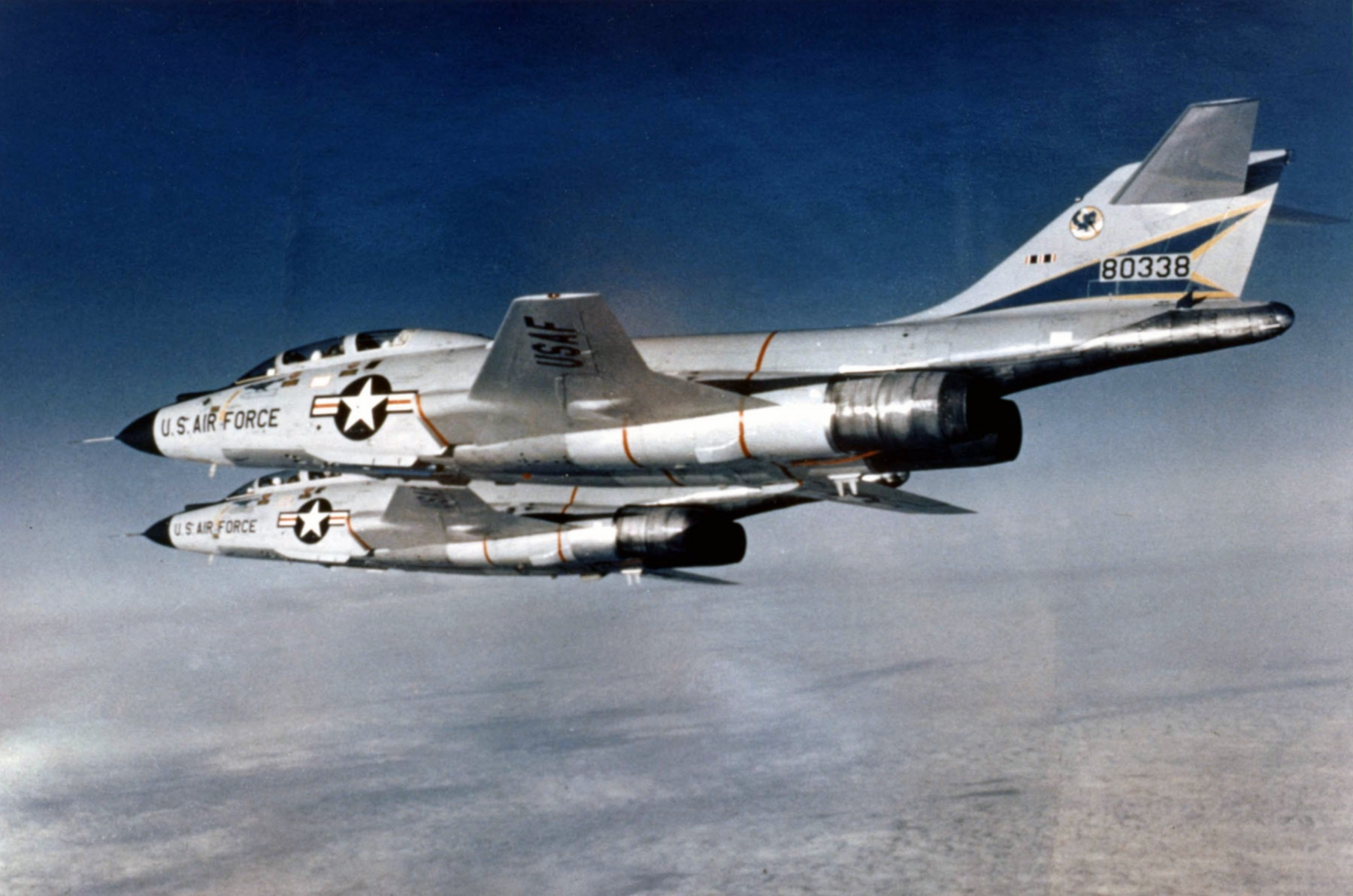
F-101B Voodoos of the 18th Fighter-Interceptor Squadron

In May 1960 the 18th Fighter-Interceptor Squadron, flying Convair F-102 Delta Daggers moved to Grand Forks from Wurtsmith Air Force Base, Michigan and was assigned to the group. With its arrival the 478th's mission expanded to train and maintain combat ready aircrews for the defense of the United States. Upon arrival at Grand Forks, the 18th began conversion to McDonnell F-101B Voodoos, completing the transition by June.

The group's host responsibilities grew as well when SAC's 4133d wing became operational, adding the 905th Air Refueling Squadron and four maintenance squadrons. The growth of the support mission at Grand Forks was recognized in April 1961 when ADC activated the 478th Fighter Wing and a number of subordinate units to replace the group.

Although the number of ADC interceptor squadrons remained almost constant in the early 1960s, attrition (and the fact that production lines closed in 1961) caused a gradual drop in the number of planes assigned to a squadron, from 24 to typically 18 by 1964. These reductions made it apparent that the primary mission of Grand Forks would be to support SAC and resulted in the inactivation of the wing and, because of its expanding role at Grand Forks, SAC assumed control of the base from ADC and the wing and all the wing's support units were transferred to SAC and were inactivated. The 18th Fighter-Interceptor Squadron transferred to the direct control of Grand Forks Air Defense Sector.

=== Systems Development ===
The wing was redesignated the 478th Aeronautical Systems Wing and activated at Wright-Patterson Air Force Base, Ohio in 2007 and was assigned three groups. The wing focused on systems development and procurement for the Lockheed Martin F-22 Raptor aircraft. It was inactivated along with the 778th and 878th groups in 2009 and its mission and personnel transferred to its subordinate 478th Aeronautical Systems Group as the Raptor approached operational capability.

== Lineage ==
478th Fighter Group

- Constituted as the 478th Fighter Group (Two Engine) on 12 October 1943

Activated on 1 December 1943
Disbanded on 31 March 1944

- Reconstituted and redesignated 478th Fighter Group (Air Defense), on 11 December 1956

Activated on 28 February 1957

- Inactivated 1 February 1961
- Consolidated 31 January 1984 with the 478th Fighter Wing (Air Defense)

478th Fighter Wing

- Constituted as the 478th Fighter-Day Wing on 25 March 1953

Redesignated 478th Fighter Wing (Air Defense) on 28 December 1960 and activated (not organized)

- Activated on 1 February 1961

Inactivated on 1 July 1963

- Consolidated 31 January 1984 with the 478th Fighter Group (Air Defense)

Consolidated Unit
- Redesignated 478th Aeronautical Systems Wing on 16 March 2007

Activated on 2 April 2007
Inactivated on 12 June 2009

=== Assignments ===
- San Francisco Fighter Wing, 1 December 1943
- Seattle Fighter Wing, 3 February 1944 – 31 March 1944
- 31st Air Division, 8 February 1957
- 29th Air Division, 1 January 1959
- Grand Forks Air Defense Sector, 1 April 1959 - 1 July 1963 (Note: 478th Fighter Group assigned prior to 1 February 1961, 478th Fighter Wing assigned subsequently.)
- Aeronautical Systems Center, 2 April 2007 - 12 June 2009

=== Components ===
==== Tactical Squadrons ====
- 18th Fighter-Interceptor Squadron, 1 May 1960 - 1 July 1963 (Note: Assigned to 478th Fighter Group prior to 1 February 1961, 478th Fighter Wing subsequently)
- 454th Fighter Squadron, 1 December 1943 – 31 March 1944 (detached to 481st Night Fighter Operational Training Group after 10 January 1944)

Salinas Army Air Base, California, 11 January 1944 - 31 March 1944

- 544th Fighter Squadron, 1 December 1943 – 31 March 1944

Paine Field, Washington, 27 January 1944 - 31 March 1944

- 545th Fighter Squadron, 1 December 1943 – 31 March 1944

Portland Army Air Base, Oregon, 29 March 1944 - 31 March 1944

- 546th Fighter Squadron, 1 December 1943 – 31 March 1944

Madras Army Air Field, Oregon, 2 February 1944
Portland Army Air Base, Oregon, 29 March 1944 -31 March 1944

==== Support Units ====
Groups

- 478th Air Base Group, 1 February 1961 - 1 July 1963
- 478th Aeronautical Systems Group. 2 April 2007 - 12 June 2009
- 778th Aeronautical Systems Group. 2 April 2007 - 12 June 2009
- 878th Aeronautical Systems Group. 2 April 2007 - 12 June 2009
- 478th USAF Dispensary (later 478th USAF Hospital), 14 June 1958 - 1 July 1963

Squadrons

- 478th Air Base Squadron, 8 February 1957 - 1 April 1961
- 478th Civil Engineering Squadron, 28 September 1960 - 1 April 1961
- 478th Consolidated Aircraft Maintenance Squadron, 1 September 1959 - 1 July 1963
- 478th Materiel Squadron, 8 February 1957 - 1 February 1961
- 478th Supply Squadron, 1 February 1961 - 1 April 1963
- 478th Transportation Squadron, 1 February 1961 - 1 July 1963

=== Stations ===
- Hamilton Field, California, 1 December 1943
- Santa Rosa Army Air Field, California, 12 December 1943
- Redmond Army Air Field, Oregon, 3 February 1944 – 31 March 1944
- Grand Forks Air Force Base, North Dakota, 20 February 1957 - 1 July 1963 (Note: 478th Fighter Group stationed prior to 1 February 1961, 478th Fighter Wing stationed subsequently.)
- Wright-Patterson Air Force Base, Ohio, 2 April 2007 - 12 June 2009

=== Aircraft ===
- Bell P-39 Airacobra, 1944
- Convair F-102A Delta Dagger, 1960
- Convair TF-102A Delta Dagger, 1960
- McDonnell F-101B Voodoo, 1960-1961; 1961-1963
