= 319th Reconnaissance Wing =

US Air Force unit assigned to the Air Combat Command

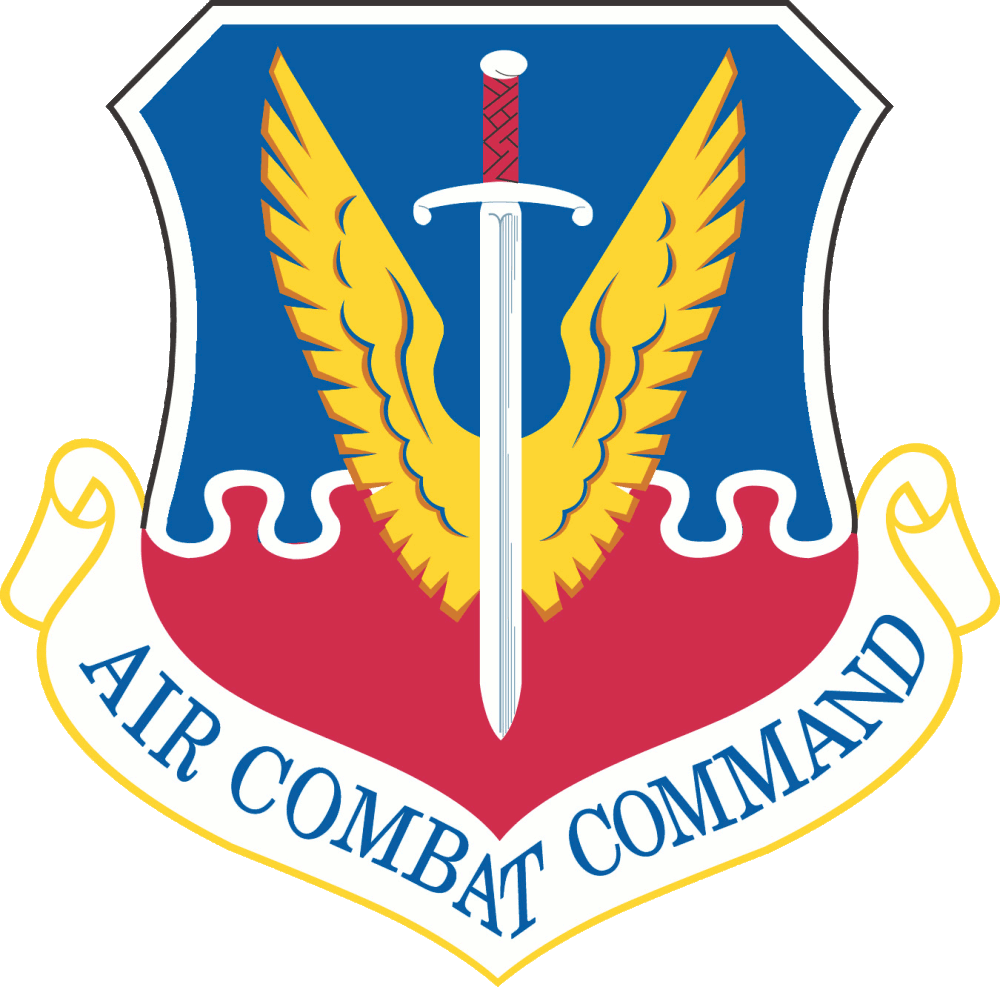
319th Reconnaissance Wing

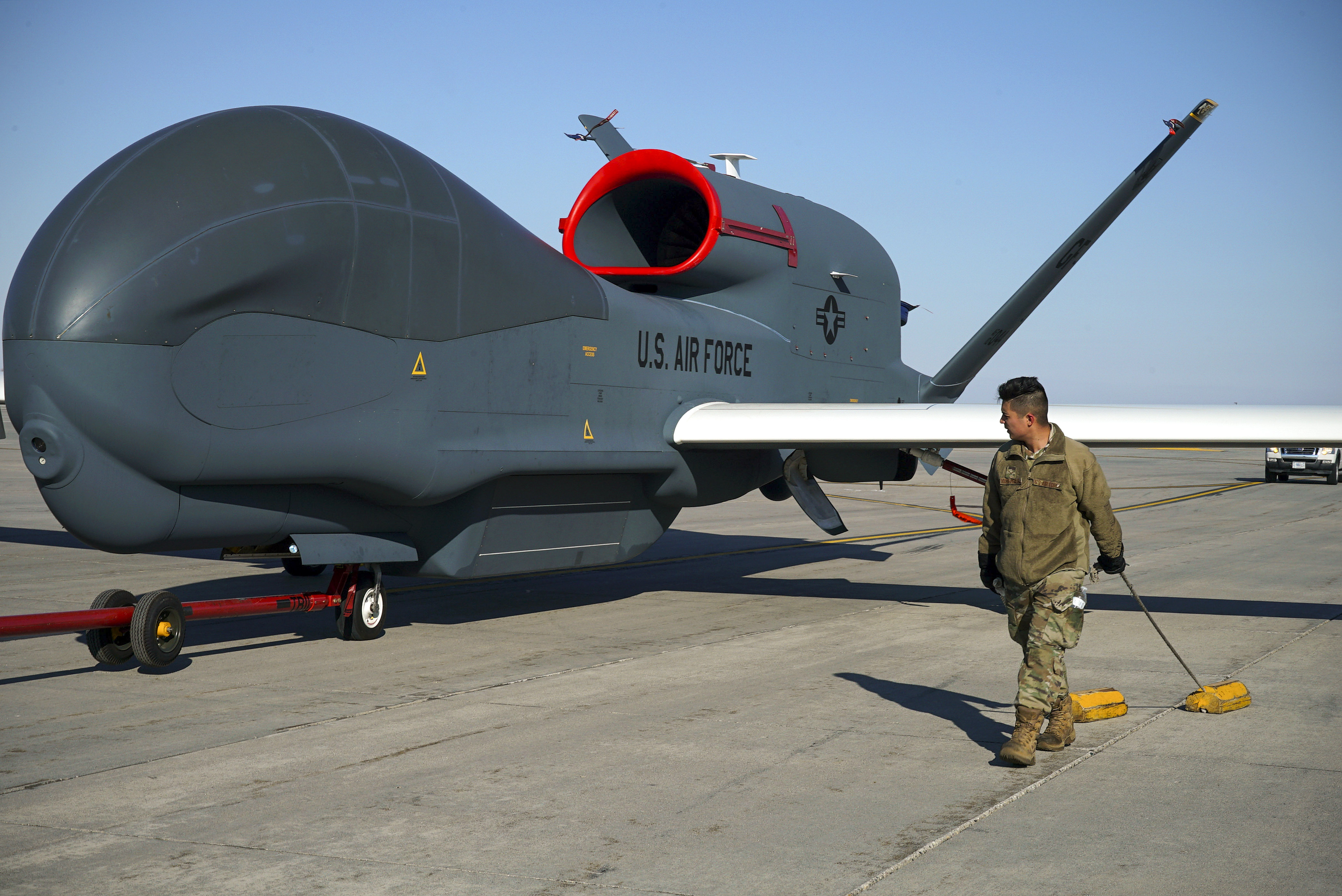
- An RQ-4 Global Hawk being towed across the flight line on Grand Forks Air Force Base in 2020
- Active: 1949; 1949–1951; 1955–1957; 1963–present
- Country: United States
- Branch: United States Air Force
- Type: Operational wing
- Role: Intelligence, surveillance and reconnaissance
- Size: 2,200 personnel
- Part of: Air Combat Command (Sixteenth Air Force)
- Headquarters: Grand Forks Air Force Base, North Dakota
- Nicknames: Warriors of the north; Griffins
- Motto: Defensores libertatis (Latin for 'Defenders of freedom')
- Decorations: Air Force Outstanding Unit Award; Distinguished Unit Citation; French Croix de Guerre with Palm
- Website: Official website

Commanders
- Current commander: Colonel Alfred J. Rosales

Insignia
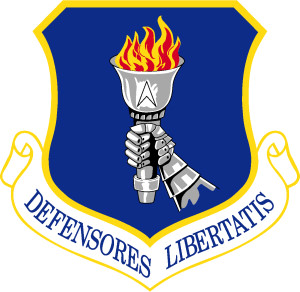
- 319th Reconnaissance Wing emblem (Note: Approved 6 January 1964.)
- Tail code: GF

Aircraft flown
- Electronic warfare: E-11A Battlefield Airborne Communications Node
- Reconnaissance: RQ-4 Global Hawk

The 319th Reconnaissance Wing is a United States Air Force unit assigned to the Air Combat Command. It is stationed at Grand Forks Air Force Base, North Dakota. The wing is the host unit at Grand Forks.

The wing operates the E-11A Battlefield Airborne Communications Node and the E/RQ-4B Global Hawk remotely piloted aircraft, delivering surveillance and reconnaissance to combatant commands. The wing comprises two groups and nine squadrons operating globally. Additionally, the 319th supports the U.S. Customs and Border Protection’s (CBP) Office of Air and Marine–North Dakota Air Branch and its National Air Security Operations Center that operate MQ-9 Reapers out of Grand Forks.

== History ==
(Note: While the 319th Operations Group is inactive, the wing is entitled, through temporary bestowal to the honors and history earned by the group. Ravenstein, Appendix V discusses the Air Force's temporary bestowal of honors and history.)

=== Reserve operations ===
==== Activation and mobilization for the Korean War ====
The 319th Bombardment Wing was first activated in the reserve on 27 June 1949 at Reading Municipal Airport, Pennsylvania, when Continental Air Command reorganized its flying units under the wing base organization system, which put combat and support organizations on an installation under a single wing. The 319th Bombardment Group, which had been stationed at Mitchel Air Force Base, New York, moved on paper to Reading and became the wing's combat organization. The 319th Wing replaced the 322d Bombardment Group and other reserve organizations at Reading. The wing began training under the supervision of the regular 2237th Air Force Reserve Training Center, but the reserve program changed and it was decided that Reading would be home to troop carrier units. The wing was inactivated on 2 September and its personnel and some of its equipment were transferred to the 512th Troop Carrier Wing, which was activated in its place.

The wing did not remain inactive long, but was reactivated on 10 October at Birmingham Municipal Airport, Alabama, where it replaced the 514th Troop Carrier Wing. It flew Douglas B-26 Invader light bombers and a variety of training aircraft, guided by the 2587th Air Force Reserve Flying Training Center. Unlike active duty combat groups, which were authorized three squadrons, the 319th's flying group controlled four combat squadrons. However, these squadrons were manned at only 25% of their authorized strength.

The 319th performed reserve training until ordered to active service along with two other reserve light bomber wings on 10 March 1951 due to the Korean War. Once activated, wing personnel and aircraft were deployed as replacements to other units. It was inactivated two weeks later on 28 March.

==== Reactivation in the reserve ====
The reserve mobilization for the Korean War left the Air Force Reserve without aircraft, and reserve units did not receive aircraft until July 1952. Among the new reserve flying organizations formed in 1952 was the 8710th Pilot Training Wing, which replaced the 905th Reserve Training Wing at Memphis Municipal Airport, Tennessee on 13 June. However, the Air Force decided that all reserve units be designed to augment the regular forces in the event of a national emergency, and the six reserve pilot training wings formed in 1952 had no mobilization mission. On 18 May 1955, the 8710th was discontinued and replaced by the 319th, now the 319th Fighter-Bomber Wing. Originally, the 46th Fighter-Bomber Squadron was the 319th's sole operational squadron, and it was equipped with Lockheed T-33 T-Birds for training reservists on jet fighter operations and Republic F-84 Thunderjets for operational use. Although titled a fighter-bomber squadron the squadron initially had an air defense mission, and from July 1956 through August 1957, maintained two Thunderjets on alert at Memphis. These two aircraft were under the operational control of the 20th Air Division of Air Defense Command.

During the first half of 1955, the Air Force began establishing detached reserve squadrons at separate sites from their parent wing locations. The concept offered several advantages: communities were more likely to accept the smaller squadrons than the large wings and the location of separate squadrons in more population centers would facilitate recruiting and manning. As it finally evolved in the spring of 1955, Continental Air Command's plan called for placing Air Force reserve units at fifty-nine installations located throughout the United States. In time, the detached squadron program proved successful in attracting additional participants As part of this program, the 319th added a second squadron, the 50th Fighter-Bomber Squadron, at Naval Air Station New Orleans on 8 June 1957.

By this time, he Joint Chiefs of Staff were pressuring the Air Force to provide more wartime airlift. About 150 Fairchild C-119 Flying Boxcars became available from the active force. Consequently, in November 1956 the Air Force directed Continental Air Command to convert three reserve fighter bomber wings to the troop carrier mission by September 1957. In addition, within the Air Staff was a recommendation that the reserve fighter mission given to the Air National Guard and replaced by the troop carrier mission. As a result, the wing was inactivated on 16 November 1957 and replaced at Memphis by the 445th Troop Carrier Wing,

=== B-52 bomber era ===
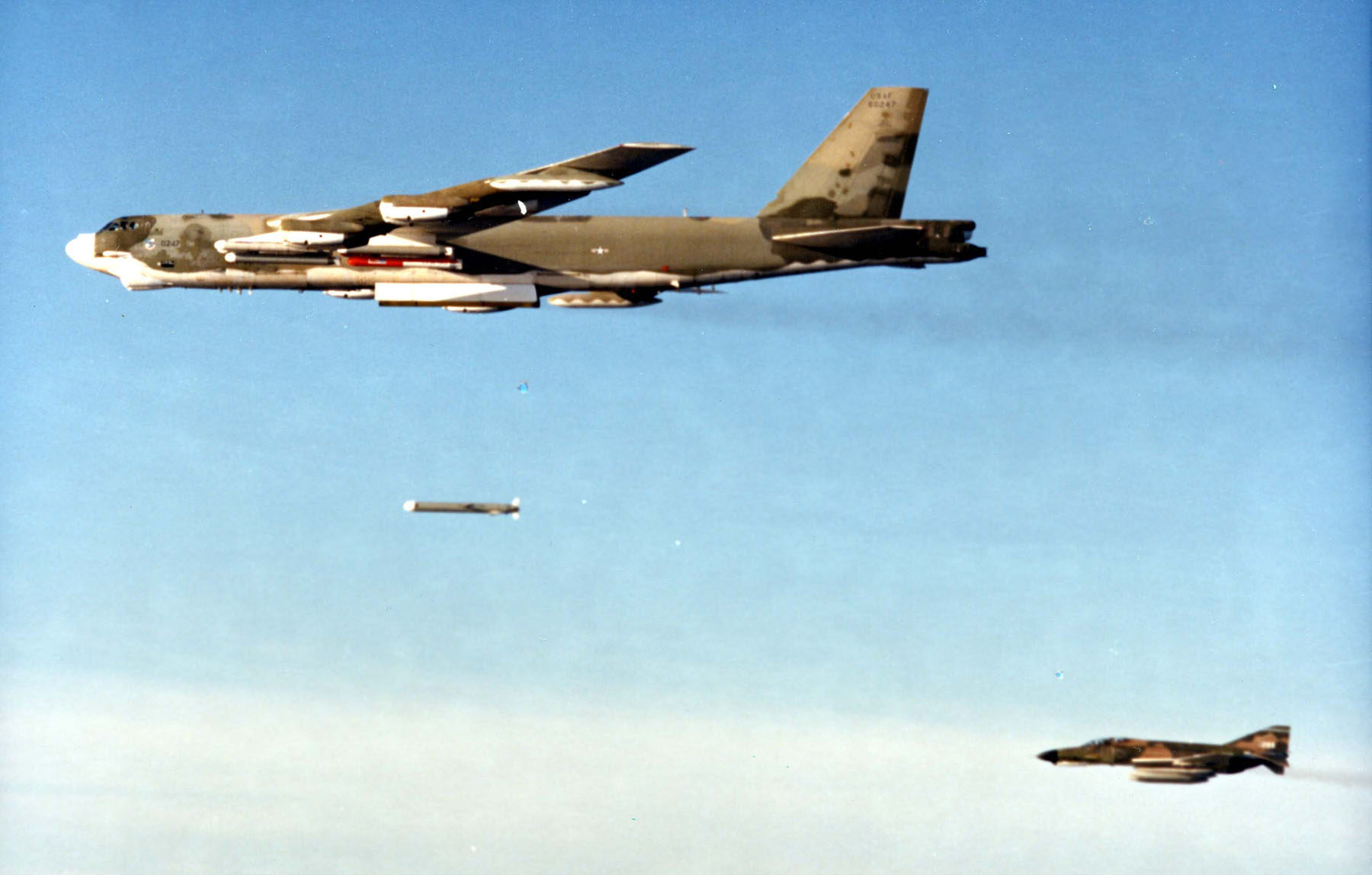
B-52G, AF Ser. No. 58-0247, dropping cruise missile

==== 4133d Strategic Wing ====
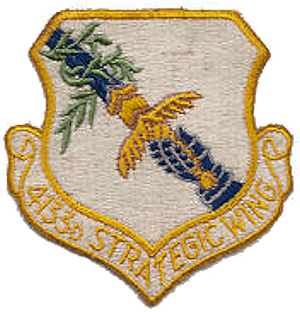
Emblem of the 4133d Strategic Wing

On 1 September 1958, Strategic Air Command (SAC) established the 4133d Strategic Wing' at Grand Forks Air Force Base, North Dakota, an Air Defense Command (ADC) base whose host was the 478th Fighter Group and assigned it to Second Air Force as part of SAC's plan to disperse its Boeing B-52 Stratofortress heavy bombers over a larger number of bases, thus making it more difficult for the Soviet Union to knock out the entire fleet with a surprise first strike. In January 1959 the 4133d was transferred to the 821st Air Division. The wing remained a headquarters only until 1 February 1960 when the 905th Air Refueling Squadron Flying Boeing KC-135 Stratotankers, three maintenance squadrons and a squadron to provide security for special weapons were activated and assigned to the wing.

In March 1961, the 39th Munitions Maintenance Squadron was activated to oversee the wing's special weapons but it was not until 1 January 1962 that the 30th Bombardment Squadron, consisting of 15 Boeing B-52Hs, moved to Grand Forks from Homestead AFB, Florida where it had been one of the three squadrons of the 19th Bombardment Wing. Starting in 1960, one third of the wing's aircraft were maintained on fifteen-minute alert, fully fueled and ready for combat to reduce vulnerability to a Soviet missile strike. This was increased to half the wing's aircraft in 1962. The 4133d (and later the 319th) continued to maintain an alert commitment until September 1991. On 1 July 1962, the 4133d was reassigned to the 810th Strategic Aerospace Division.

==== 319th Bombardment Wing ====
In 1962, in order to perpetuate the lineage of many currently inactive bombardment units with illustrious World War II records, Headquarters SAC received authority from Headquarters USAF to discontinue its Major Command controlled (MAJCOM) strategic wings that were equipped with combat aircraft and to activate Air Force controlled (AFCON) units, most of which were inactive at the time which could carry a lineage and history. (Note: MAJCON units could not carry a permanent history or lineage. Ravenstein, Guide to Air Force Lineage and Honors, p. 12.)

As a result, the 4133d Wing was replaced by the 319th Bombardment Wing, which assumed its mission, personnel, and equipment on 1 February 1963. (Note: The 319th Wing continued, through temporary bestowal, the history, and honors of the World War II 319th Bombardment Group. It was also entitled to retain the honors (but not the history or lineage) of the 4133d.) The 46th Bombardment Squadron, a squadron that had been assigned to the wing when it was a reserve organization, replaced the 30th Squadron. The 905th Air Refueling Squadron and the 59th Munitions Maintenance Squadron' were reassigned to the 319th. Component support units were replaced by units with the numerical designation of the newly established wing. Each of the new units assumed the personnel, equipment, and mission of its predecessor.

Shortly after the wing was activated, Grand Forks was transferred from ADC to SAC in July 1963, and the personnel and equipment of ADC's 478th Air Base Group and 478th USAF Dispensary were transferred to form the wing's 319th Combat Support Group and 804th Medical Group. In 1964, however, the wing became a tenant of the 321st Strategic Missile Wing as its base support mission, manpower, and equipment was transferred to the 321st.

The wing placed aircraft on peacetime quick reaction alert duty, and conducted global bombardment training for Emergency War Order operations and air refueling operations to meet SAC commitments. During the Vietnam War, the 319th Bomb Wing's mission expanded to include sending bomber and tanker aircrews on temporary duty assignments to support B-52 and KC-135 operations from 1963 to 1974. Tanker crews participated in refueling operations for both bombers and fighters. The bomb crews flew B-52Ds from bases at Andersen Air Force Base, Guam; Kadena Air Base, Okinawa, and U-Tapao RTNAF, Thailand. Bomber crews participated in Operation Arc Light in 1968 and Operations Linebacker I and Linebacker II in 1972.

In 1973, the 319th Bombardment Wing acquired the AGM-69 Short Range Attack Missile, replacing the older AGM-28 Hound Dog air-to-ground missile aboard its B-52Hs. As the activities in Southeast Asia decreased, the 319th Bomb Wing focused its full efforts on training crews to fly strategic strike missions. It participated in a SAC program to test admission of females to the inflight refueling career field, January–December 1979.

=== B-1 bomber era ===
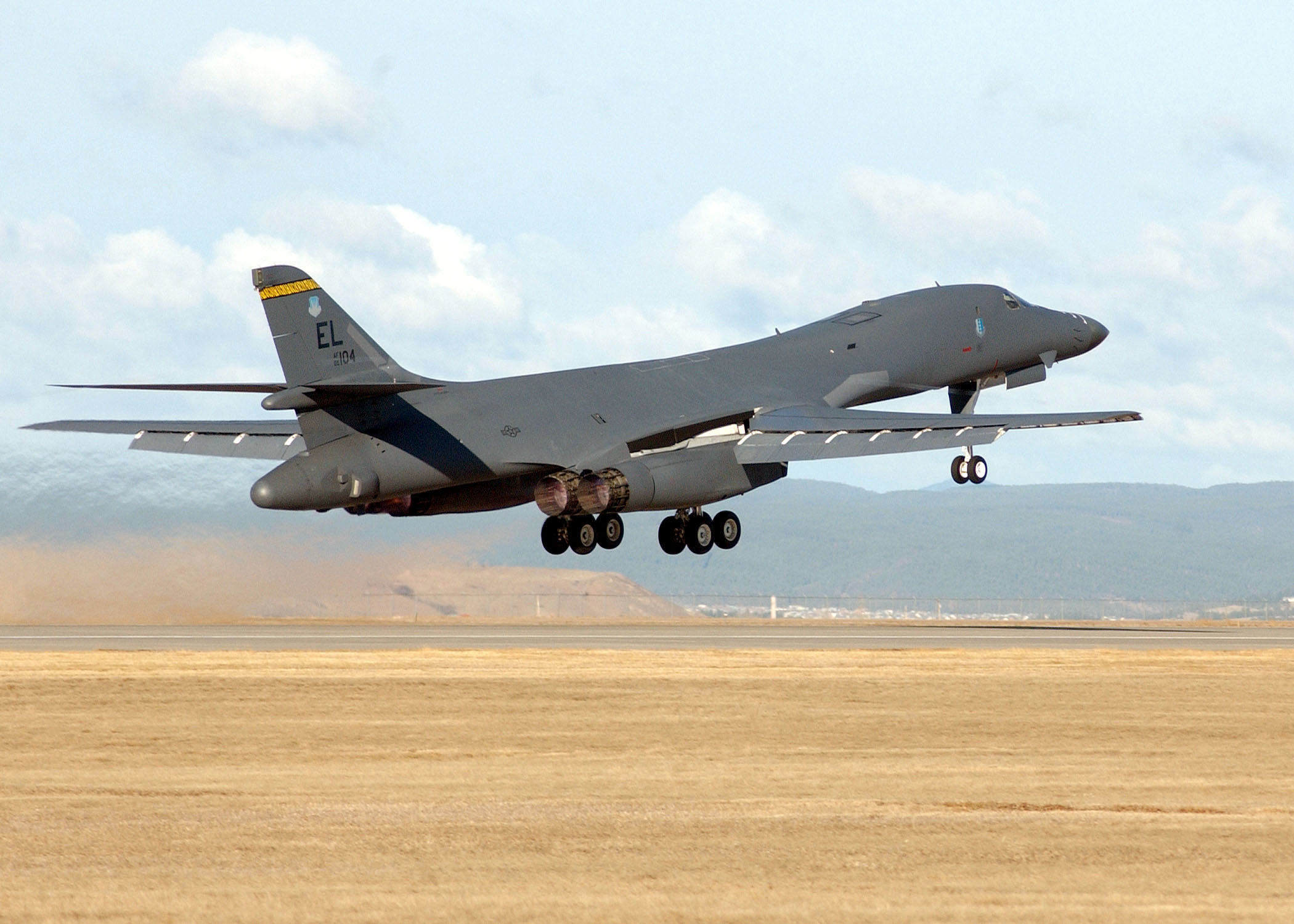
B-1 Lancer taking off

The wing converted from B-52 to Rockwell B-1B Lancer bombers, 1986–1987 and flew training missions with conventional and nuclear configurations. Tanker crews assigned to the wing assisted in air refueling efforts during the invasion of Panama in December 1989. It deployed tankers to Oman, Egypt, and Saudi Arabia to provide air refueling and cargo missions in Southwest Asia, August 1990 – April 1991.

In line with the changing international situation, President George H. W. Bush decided to reduce the US nuclear alert force. Thus, on 28 September 1991, the 319th Wing pulled its B-1B bombers and KC-135R tankers from quick reaction alert duty, ending nearly three decades of such activity at Grand Forks.

With the inactivation of SAC on 1 June 1992, the Air Force redesignated the 319th Wing as the 319th Wing and assigned it to the newly established Air Combat Command (ACC). At the same time, the wing's 905th Air Refueling Squadron and its KC-135R tankers were assigned to the 305th Air Refueling Wing at Grissom Air Force Base, Indiana, despite the fact that they remained physically stationed at Grand Forks AFB. Because it had lost its air refueling components, the wing became the 319th Bomb Wing. Still remaining at Grand Forks, the 905th was reassigned to the 43d Air Refueling Wing at Malmstrom Air Force Base, Montana, on 1 July 1993.

On 1 February 1993 ACC dropped the 319th Bomb Wing's primary nuclear mission and gave the wing the primary mission of B-1B conventional bombardment operations. The wing began planning and training to support such a mission to counter worldwide regional threats.

=== Refueling era ===
On 1 October 1993 the Air Force redesignated the 319th Bomb Wing as the 319th Air Refueling Wing. The wing was reassigned from the Air Combat Command to the Air Mobility Command. It also reacquired the 905th Air Refueling Squadron and its KC-135R tankers while turning over its B-1B bombers to the newly activated 319th Bomb Group, an ACC organization. (Note: The 319th Bomb Group was a newly formed organization and is not related to the 319th Bombardment Group of World War II. The 319th Bomb Group was assigned to Eighth Air Force until it was inactivated on 16 July 1994 with the transfer of the last of Grand Fork's Lancers.) On 1 February 1994, Air Mobility Command transferred the 906th Air Refueling Squadron from Minot Air Force Base, North Dakota, to the 319th Wing and on 1 April, the 912th Air Refueling Squadron moved from Robins Air Force Base, Georgia to join the wing. Lastly, the 911th Air Refueling Squadron was transferred from Seymour Johnson Air Force Base, North Carolina on 29 April 1994.

The 319th supported worldwide tanker task forces, as well as combat operations in Southwest Asia, Central Europe, and counter narco-terror operations in Central America by providing air refueling for combat aircraft.

==== Operation Noble Eagle ====
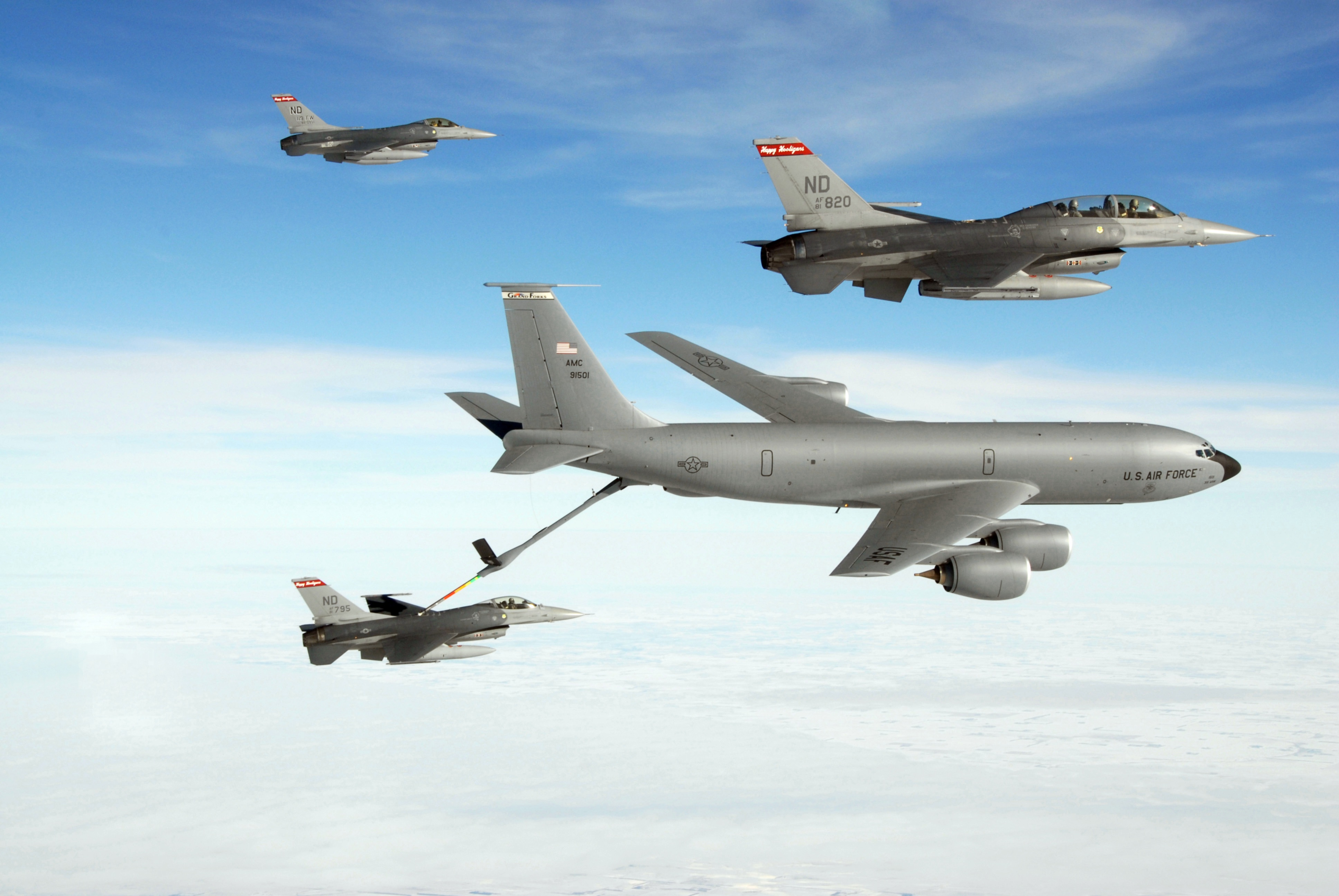
KC-135R Stratotanker from 319th Air Refueling Wing refueling F-16 fighters

After the September 11 attacks, the wing was the first to fly an Air Mobility Command sortie supporting the Air Force's response to the terrorist attacks by refueling the F-16 that delivered the Federal Emergency Management Agency director to New York only three and a half hours after the attacks. All of the 319th Air Refueling Wing's mission-capable aircraft were prepped, fueled and cocked within 24 hours.

By the end of 2001, the wing had flown more than 120 Operation Noble Eagle sorties, off-loading more than 4.8 million pounds of fuel to 260 combat air patrol and support aircraft. KC-135 tankers from the 319th were the first on the ground, first in the air, first to fly over enemy territory, and first to provide aerial refueling while a base of operations in the Persian Gulf was being established for Operation Enduring Freedom. In total, they had flown more than 890 sorties, flying 6,700 hours and off-loading more than 50 million pounds of fuel to more than 3,000 receivers.

The wing also earned an "excellent" and "solid green" for the deployed 319th Expeditionary Air Refueling Squadron during the first-ever Expeditionary Operational Readiness Inspection while conducting operations at Incirlik Air Base, Turkey. Additionally, for the second year in a row, the 319th Aircraft Generation Squadron earned top Air Mobility Command aircraft maintenance effectiveness honors for the medium category.

The wing reached a significant milestone 3 July 2002 by flying its 1,000th hour in support of Operation Noble Eagle. The milestone-marking mission started the evening of 2 July and was commanded by Capt Kulka of the 905th Air Refueling Squadron. The crew's mission was to provide fuel to F-16's from Shaw Air Force Base, SC, while they patrolled the skies over the nation's capitol.

=== Unmanned aerial vehicle ===
In March 2011, pursuant to a Base Realignment and Closure decision, the wing lost its operational manned flying mission and was redesignated the 319th Air Base Wing. May 26, 2011 the wing received its first RQ-4 Global Hawk.

In September, remotely piloted aircraft operations commenced when the 69th Reconnaissance Group of Air Combat Command, flying the RQ-4 Global Hawk, was activated at Grand Forks. Although the 69th is assigned to the 9th Reconnaissance Wing at Beale Air Force Base, California, it receives administrative and logistics support from the 319th. 69th Reconnaissance Group reached another milestone August 7, 2012 with its first flight of a Block 40 RQ-4 Global Hawk.

The Block 40 RQ-4 Global Hawk features a multiplatform radar technology insertion program (MP-RTIP) active electronically scanned array (AESA) radar with air-to-surface capability that provides wide-area surveillance of stationary and moving targets.

In recognizing that the wing's mission was now to support this mission, on 13 June 2017, the 319th was reassigned from Air Mobility Command to Air Combat Command.

On 28 June 2019 the 319th Air Base Wing was redesignated the 319th Reconnaissance Wing. The wing was one of only three "super tanker" wings in the United States Air Force.

== Mission ==
The 319th Reconnaissance Wing carries out the RQ-4 Global Hawk High Altitude surveillance and reconnaissance mission; ensures strategic command and control through operation of the Nation's High Frequency Global Communication System.

The 4th Reconnaissance Squadron of the 319th Operations Group is based at Andersen AFB in Guam, however the units RQ-4B Global Hawks deploy to Yokota AB in Japan during typhoon season, normally June to December.

The 319th Operations Group also supports the 472nd Electronic Combat Squadron at Robins Air Force Base, Georgia, which operates the E-11A Battlefield Airborne Communications Node that allows personnel to exchange information from multiple air, ground, and maritime sources.

The wing comprises 2,200 personnel, and as of July 2025 is commanded by Colonel Alfred J. Rosales.

== Component units ==
Unless otherwise indicated, units are based at Grand Forks Air Force Base, North Dakota, and subordinate units are located at the same location as their commanding group.

Wing Staff

- 319th Comptroller Squadron

319th Operations Group

- 4th Reconnaissance Squadron – RQ-4 Global Hawk (Andersen AFB, Guam / Yokota AB, Japan)
- 7th Reconnaissance Squadron – RQ-4 Global Hawk (Naval Air Station Sigonella, Italy)
- 319th Aircraft Maintenance Squadron
- 319th Operations Support Squadron
- 348th Reconnaissance Squadron – RQ-4 Global Hawk
- 472nd Electronic Combat Squadron – E-11A Battlefield Airborne Communications Node (Robins AFB, Georgia)

319th Mission Support Group

- 319th Civil Engineer Squadron
- 319th Communications Squadron
- 319th Contracting Squadron
- 319th Force Support Squadron
- 319th Logistics Readiness Squadron
- 319th Security Forces Squadron

319th Medical Group

- 319th Health Care Operations Squadron
- 319th Medical Support Squadron
- 319th Operational Medical Readiness Squadron

== Lineage ==
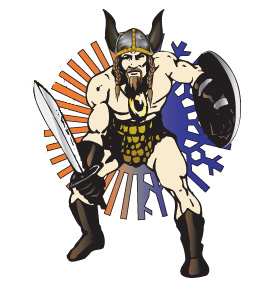
- Warriors of the North
  Constituted as the 319th Bombardment Wing, Light on 10 May 1949

Activated in the reserve on 27 June 1949
Inactivated on 2 September 1949

- Activated on 10 October 1949

Ordered to active service on 10 March 1951
Inactivated on 28 March 1951

- Redesignated 319th Fighter-Bomber Wing on 12 April 1955

Activated in the reserve on 18 May 1955
Inactivated on 16 November 1957

- Redesignated 319th Bombardment Wing, Heavy on 15 November 1962

Activated on 15 November 1962 (not organized)
Organized on 1 February 1963
Redesignated 319th Wing on 1 September 1991
Redesignated 319th Bomb Wing on 1 June 1992
Redesignated 319th Air Refueling Wing on 1 October 1993
Redesignated 319th Air Base Wing on 1 March 2011
Redesignated 319th Reconnaissance Wing on 28 June 2019

=== Assignments ===
- Ninth Air Force, 27 June 1949 – 2 September 1949
- Fourteenth Air Force, 10 October 1949 – 28 March 1951
- Fourteenth Air Force, 18 May 1955 – 16 November 1957
- Strategic Air Command, 15 November 1962 (not organized)
- 810th Strategic Aerospace Division, 1 February 1963
- 4th Strategic Aerospace Division, 1 September 1964
- 47th Air Division, 30 June 1971
- 4th Strategic Missile Division (later, 4 Air Division), 15 January 1973
- 57th Air Division, 22 January 1975
- 4th Air Division, 1 May 1982
- 57th Air Division, 23 January 1987
- 42d Air Division, 16 June 1988
- Eighth Air Force, 9 July 1991
- Twenty-First Air Force, 1 October 1993
- Fifteenth Air Force, 1 April 1997
- Eighteenth Air Force, 1 October 2003
- USAF Air Expeditionary Center, 7 January 2011
- Twenty-Fifth Air Force, 13 June 2017
- Sixteenth Air Force, 11 October 2019 – present

=== Stations ===
- Reading Municipal Airport, Pennsylvania, 27 June 1949 – 2 September 1949
- Birmingham Municipal Airport, Alabama, 10 October 1949 – 28 March 1951
- Memphis Municipal Airport, Tennessee, 18 May 1955 – 16 November 1957
- Grand Forks Air Force Base, North Dakota, 1 February 1963 – present

=== Components ===
==== Groups ====
- 319th Air Base Group (later 319th Combat Support Group. 319th Support Group, 319th Mission Support Group): 27 June 1949 – 2 September 1949; 10 October 1949 – 22 March 1951; 18 May 1955 – 16 November 1957; 1 September 1991 – present
- 319th Bombardment Group (later, 319th Fighter-Bomber Group, 319th Operations Group): 27 June 1949 – 2 September 1949; 10 October 1949 – 22 March 1951; 18 May 1955 – 16 November 1957; 1 September 1991 – present
- 319th Maintenance and Supply Group (later 319th Maintenance Group, 319th Logistics Group): 27 June 1949 – 2 September 1949; 10 October 1949 – 22 March 1951; 18 May 1955 – 16 November 1957; 1 September 1991 – present
- 319th Medical Group (later 319th Tactical Hospital, 319th Medical Group): 27 June 1949 – 2 September 1949; 10 October 1949 – 22 March 1951; 18 May 1955 – 16 November 1957; 1 September 1991 – present
- 804th Medical Group; 1 July 1963 – 1 November 1964

==== Squadrons ====
Operational Squadrons

- 46th Bombardment Squadron: 1 February 1963 – 1 September 1991
- 905th Air Refueling Squadron: 1 February 1963 – 1 September 1991

Support and Maintenance Squadrons

- 319th Airborne Missile Maintenance Squadron: 1 February 1963 – 30 June 1974
- 319th Armament and Electronics Maintenance Squadron (later 319th Avionics Maintenance Squadron): 1 February 1963 – 31 March 1991
- 319th Comptroller Squadron: 1 September 1991 – 1 July 1994; 1 March 1996 – present
- 319th Field Maintenance Squadron: 1 February 1963 – 1 September 1991
- 319th Organizational Maintenance Squadron: 1 February 1963 – 1 September 1991

=== Aircraft ===
- Douglas B-26 Invader (1949–1951)
- North American T-6 Texan (1949–1951)
- Beechcraft AT-7 Navigator (1949–1951)
- Republic F-84 Thunderjet (1955–1957)
- Lockheed T-33 T-Bird (1955–1957)
- North American F-86 Sabre (1957)
- Boeing B-52 Stratofortress (1963–1986)
- Boeing KC-135 Stratotanker (1963–2011)
- Rockwell B-1 Lancer (1987–1993)
- Beechcraft C-12 Huron (1993–1995)
- Northrop Grumman RQ-4 Global Hawk (2011–present)

=== Awards and campaigns ===
Award streamer	Award	Dates	Notes
	Air Force Outstanding Unit Award	1 July 1977 – 30 June 1979	319th Bombardment Wing
	Air Force Outstanding Unit Award	1 October 1993 – 30 June 1995	319th Air Refueling Wing
	Air Force Outstanding Unit Award	1 July 1995 – 30 June 1997	319th Air Refueling Wing
	Air Force Outstanding Unit Award	1 July 2000 – 30 June 2002	319th Air Refueling Wing
	Air Force Outstanding Unit Award	1 July 2002 – 30 June 2004	319th Air Refueling Wing
	French Croix de Guerre with Palm	April, May, June 1944	bestowed, earned by 319th Bombardment Group

== See also ==
- List of B-52 Units of the United States Air Force
- List of wings of the United States Air Force
