= Grand Forks Air Defense Sector =

Grand Forks Air Defense Sector

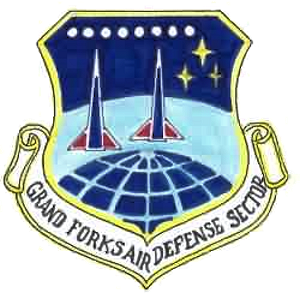
- Emblem of Grand Forks Air Defense Sector
- Active: 1957–1963
- Country: United States
- Branch: United States Air Force
- Role: Air Defense
- Part of: Air Defense Command

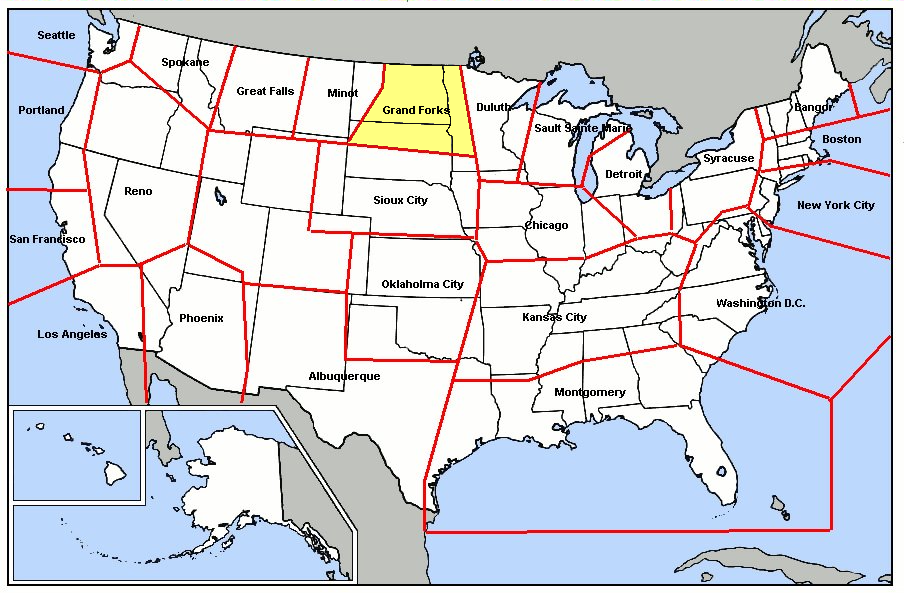
Map of Grand Forks ADS

The Grand Forks Air Defense Sector (GFADS) is an inactive United States Air Force organization. Its last assignment was with the Air Defense Command 29th Air Division, being stationed at Grand Forks Air Force Base, North Dakota. It was inactivated on 1 December 1963

== History ==
Established in December 1957 assuming control of former ADC Central Air Defense Force units with a mission to provide air defense of most of North Dakota along with western Minnesota and northern South Dakota. The organization provided command and control over several aircraft and radar squadrons.

On 15 November 1959, the new Semi Automatic Ground Environment (SAGE) Direction Center (DC-11) became operational. 47°56′47″N 097°22′55″W DC-11 was equipped with dual AN/FSQ-7 Computers. The day-to-day operations of the command was to train and maintain tactical flying units flying jet interceptor aircraft (F-94 Starfire; F-102 Delta Dagger; F-106 Delta Dart) in a state of readiness with training missions and series of exercises with SAC and other units simulating interceptions of incoming enemy aircraft.

Consolidated on 1 May 1963 with Minot Air Defense Sector. Inactivated on 1 December 1963 as part of ADC reorganization and consolidation, most units being reassigned to the 29th Air Division.

=== Lineage ===
- Established as Grand Forks Air Defense Sector on 8 December 1957

Inactivated on 1 December 1963

=== Assignments ===
- 31st Air Division, 8 December 1957
- 29th Air Division, 1 January 1959 – 1 December 1963

=== Stations ===
- Grand Forks AFB, North Dakota, 8 December 1957 – 1 December 1963

=== Components ===
==== Wing ====
- 478th Fighter Wing (Air Defense)

Grand Forks AFB, North Dakota, 1 February 1961 – 1 July 1963

==== Wing ====
- 478th Fighter Group (Air Defense)

Grand Forks AFB, North Dakota, 1 April 1959 – 1 February 1961

==== Interceptor Squadrons ====
- 18th Fighter-Interceptor Squadron

Grand Forks AFB, North Dakota, 1 July-4 September 1963

==== Radar Squadrons ====
- 721st Radar Squadron

Willmar AFS, Minnesota, 1 April 1959 – 1 June 1961

- 739th Radar Squadron

Wadena AFS, Minnesota, 1 April 1959 – 4 September 1963

- 785th Radar Squadron

Finley AFS, Minnesota, 1 April 1959 – 4 September 1963

- 787th Radar Squadron

Chandler AFS, Minnesota, 1 March 1961 – 4 September 1963

- 903d Radar Squadron

Gettysburg AFS, South Dakota, 4 September 1963 – 1 April 1966

- 916th Aircraft Control and Warning Squadron

Beausejour AS, Manitoba, 1 April 1959 – 1 October 1961

== See also ==
- List of USAF Aerospace Defense Command General Surveillance Radar Stations
- Aerospace Defense Command Fighter Squadrons
