= C. D. Moore =

United States Air Force general

C. D. Moore II
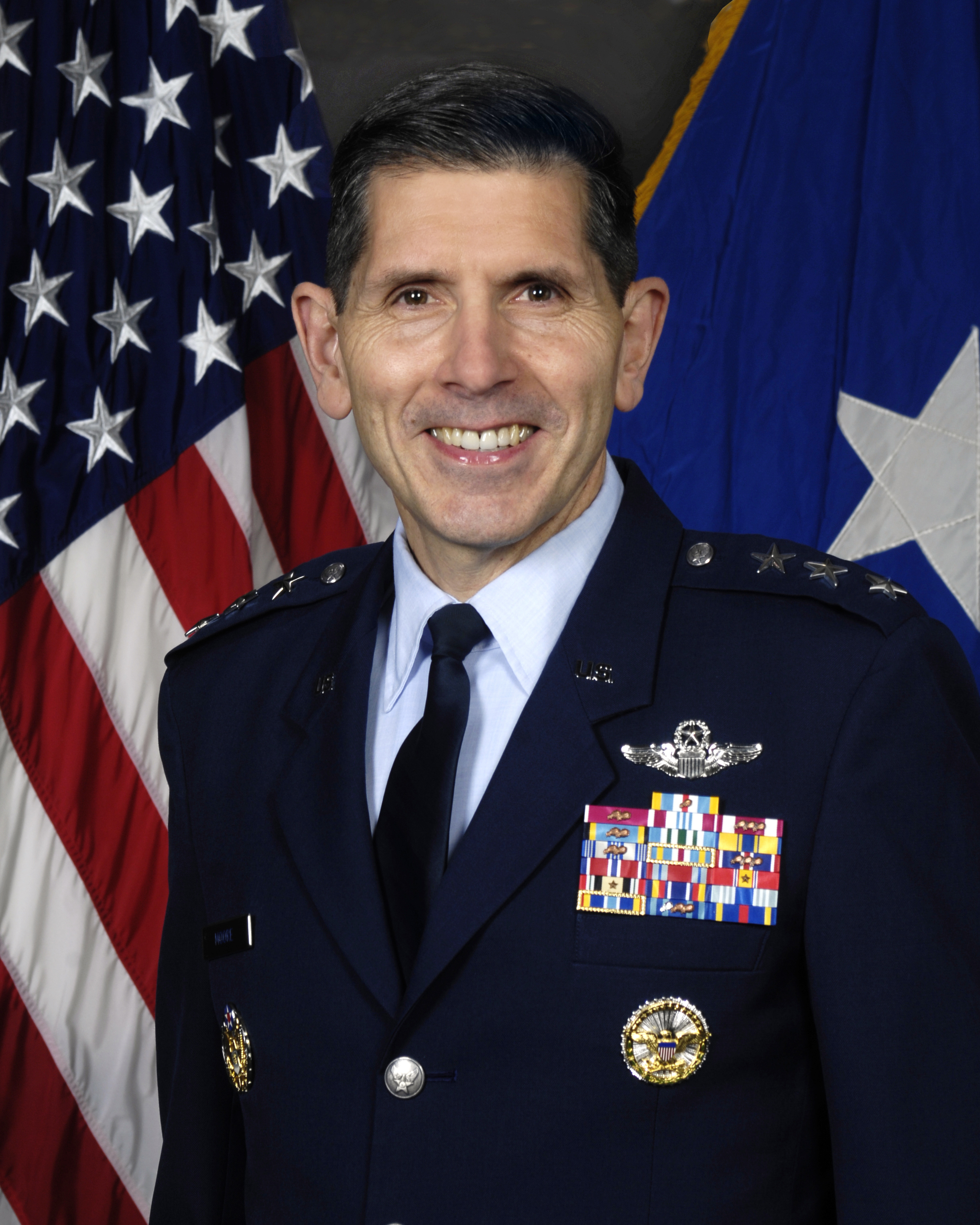
- Born: February 6, 1958 (age 68); Keystone, South Dakota, U.S.
- Military career
- Allegiance: United States
- Branch: United States Air Force
- Service years: 1980–2014
- Rank: Lieutenant General
- Commands: Air Force Life Cycle Management Center; 478th Aeronautical Systems Wing; 46th Operations Group
- Conflicts: Iraq War
- Awards: Air Force Distinguished Service Medal; Defense Superior Service Medal (2); Legion of Merit (3)

Lieutenant General Clyde Dewey Moore II (born February 6, 1958) is a retired United States Air Force officer who served as Commander, Air Force Life Cycle Management Center, Wright-Patterson Air Force Base, Ohio. The organization is the single center responsible for total life cycle management covering all aircraft, engines, munitions, and electronic systems.

== Military career ==
Moore is a distinguished graduate of the United States Air Force Academy as well as the top graduate in engineering. A Guggenheim Fellow, he completed a Master of Science degree in aeronautical engineering at Columbia University before entering flight school in 1981. He served as a T-38 instructor pilot, an operational F-15 pilot and as an experimental test pilot. General Moore also served as commander of the first F-22 squadron as well as a group commander at Eglin AFB, Florida, Materiel Wing Director of the F-16 System Program Office, Materiel Wing Commander of the F-22 System Program Office, and Vice Commander of the Aeronautical Systems Center.

Moore's staff assignments include Director of Special Programs in the Office of the Under Secretary of Defense for Acquisition, Technology and Logistics, and the Deputy Director of the Global Power Directorate in the Office of the Assistant Secretary of the Air Force for Acquisition, and Deputy Program Executive Officer of the F-35 Joint Program Office. Moore served as the Chief of Air Operations, Multi-National Forces-Iraq in 2004, and he is a command pilot with more than 3,000 flight hours in 30 types of aircraft. Prior to assuming command of AFLCMC, Moore was Vice Commander, Air Force Materiel Command.

== Education ==
- 1980 Distinguished graduate, Bachelor of Science degrees in aeronautical engineering and political science, U.S. Air Force Academy, Colorado Springs, Colo.
- 1981 Master of Science degree in aeronautical engineering, Columbia University, New York, N.Y.
- 1984 Distinguished graduate, Squadron Officer School, Maxwell AFB, Ala.
- 1995 Advanced Program Management Course, Defense Systems Management College, Fort Belvoir, Va.
- 1998 Distinguished graduate, Master of Science degree in national resource strategy, Industrial College of the Armed Forces, National Defense University, Fort Lesley J. McNair, Washington, D.C.
- 2004 Executive Management Program, Kellogg Business School, Northwestern University, Ill.

== Assignments ==
- 1. May 1980 – May 1981, graduate student, Columbia University, New York, N.Y.
- 2. May 1981 – May 1982, student, undergraduate pilot training, Reese AFB, Texas
- 3. May 1982 – October 1982, student, pilot instructor training, Randolph AFB, Texas
- 4. October 1982 – July 1984, T-38 instructor pilot, 54th Flying Training Squadron, and T-38 flight examiner, 64th Flying Training Wing, Reese AFB, Texas
- 5. July 1984 – December 1984, student, Squadron Officer School, Maxwell AFB, Ala.
- 6. December 1984 – December 1985, T-38 instructor pilot and wing executive officer, 64th Flying Training Wing, Reese AFB, Texas
- 7. December 1985 – November 1986, tactical support systems analyst, Air Staff Training Program, Air Force Center for Studies and Analyses, the Pentagon, Washington, D.C.
- 8. November 1986 – February 1987, student, AT-38 fighter lead-in training, Holloman AFB, N.M.
- 9. February 1987 – June 1987, student, F-15 Operational Training Course, 426th Tactical Fighter Training Squadron, Luke AFB, Ariz.
- 10. June 1987 – June 1990, F-15 pilot, flight commander and instructor pilot, 43rd Tactical Fighter Squadron, Elmendorf AFB, Alaska
- 11. June 1990 – June 1991, student, USAF Test Pilot School, Edwards AFB, Calif.
- 12. June 1991 – June 1992, F-16 and T-38 experimental test pilot, 6512th Test Operations Squadron, Edwards AFB, Calif.
- 13. June 1992 – January 1995, F-16 test pilot, assistant operations officer and operations officer, 416th Flight Test Squadron, Edwards AFB, Calif.
- 14. January 1995 – June 1995, student, Advanced Program Manager Course, Defense Systems Management College, Fort Belvoir, Va.
- 15. June 1995 – June 1997, Chief, F-16 Requirements and Program Development Integrated Product Team, F-16 System Program Office, Wright-Patterson AFB, Ohio
- 16. June 1997 – June 1998, student, Industrial College of the Armed Forces, National Defense University, Fort Lesley J. McNair, Washington, D.C.
- 17. June 1998 – July 1999, F/A-22 test pilot and Commander, 411th Flight Test Squadron, Edwards AFB, Calif.
- 18. July 1999 – July 2000, Director, F/A-22 Combined Test Force, and Chief, Test and Evaluation Division, System Program Office, Edwards AFB, Calif.
- 19. July 2000 – June 2002, Commander, 46th Operations Group, Eglin AFB, Fla.
- 20. June 2002 – September 2003, Materiel Wing Director, F-16 System Program Office, Aeronautical Systems Center, Wright-Patterson AFB, Ohio
- 21. September 2003 – August 2004, Vice Commander, Aeronautical Systems Center, Wright-Patterson AFB, Ohio (January 2004 – June 2004, Chief of Air Operations, Multi-National Forces-Iraq)
- 22. August 2004 – August 2005, Deputy Director, Global Power Programs, Office of the Assistant Secretary of the Air Force for Acquisition, the Pentagon, Washington, D.C.
- 23. August 2005 – November 2005, Deputy Director, Directorate of Capabilities Integration and Transformation, Headquarters Air Force Materiel Command, Wright-Patterson AFB, Ohio
- 24. November 2005 – May 2007, Director, F-22 System Program Office, Aeronautical Systems Center, Wright-Patterson AFB, Ohio
- 25. May 2007 – July 2008, Commander, 478th Aeronautical Systems Wing, Wright-Patterson AFB, Ohio
- 26. July 2008 – June 2009, Director, Special Programs, Office of the Under Secretary of Defense for Acquisition, Technology and Logistics, the Pentagon, Washington, D.C.
- 27. June 2009 – September 2011, Deputy Director, Joint Strike Fighter Program Office, Arlington, Va.
- 28. October 2011 – July 2012, Vice Commander, Headquarters Air Force Materiel Command, Wright-Patterson AFB, Ohio
- 29. July 2012 – September, 2014, Commander, Air Force Life Cycle Management Center, Wright-Patterson AFB, Ohio

== Flight information ==
- Rating: Command pilot
- Flight hours: 3,100
- Primary aircraft flown: F-22, F-16, F-15 and T-38

== Major awards and decorations ==
- Air Force Distinguished Service Medal
- Defense Superior Service Medal with oak leaf cluster
- Legion of Merit with two oak leaf clusters
- Defense Meritorious Service Medal
- Meritorious Service Medal with three oak leaf clusters
- Aerial Achievement Medal with two oak leaf clusters
- Joint Service Commendation Medal
- Air Force Commendation Medal
- Air Force Achievement Medal with two oak leaf clusters
- Combat Readiness Medal
- Iraq Campaign Medal
- Global War on Terrorism Expeditionary Medal
- Global War on Terrorism Service Medal
- Air Force Expeditionary Service Ribbon with Gold Border

== Other achievements ==
- Leadership awards, undergraduate pilot training and F-15 Operational Training Course
- Top graduate, Pilot Instructor Training Course
- 1999 Laurels Award, Aviation Week and Space Technology

== Effective dates of promotion ==
- Second lieutenant May 28, 1980
- First lieutenant May 28, 1982
- Captain May 28, 1984
- Major Oct. 1, 1991
- Lieutenant colonel Feb. 1, 1995
- Colonel March 1, 2000
- Brigadier general Aug. 2, 2006
- Major general Aug. 17, 2009
- Lieutenant general Oct. 3, 2011

== General references ==
- "Maj Gen C.D. Moore, United States Air Force". jsf.mil. Archived from the original on August 11, 2011.
- "Biographies : Major General C.D. Moore II". USAF. Archived from the original on June 28, 2011.
