= 905th Air Refueling Squadron =

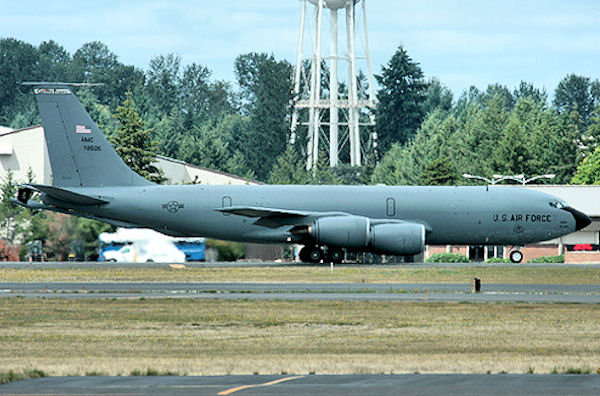
- KC-135R Stratotanker at Grand Forks Air Force Base
- Active: 1942–1944; 1959–2010; 2019–Present
- Country: United States
- Branch: United States Air Force
- Role: Air Refueling
- Part of: Air Mobility Command
- Decorations: Air Force Outstanding Unit Award

Insignia
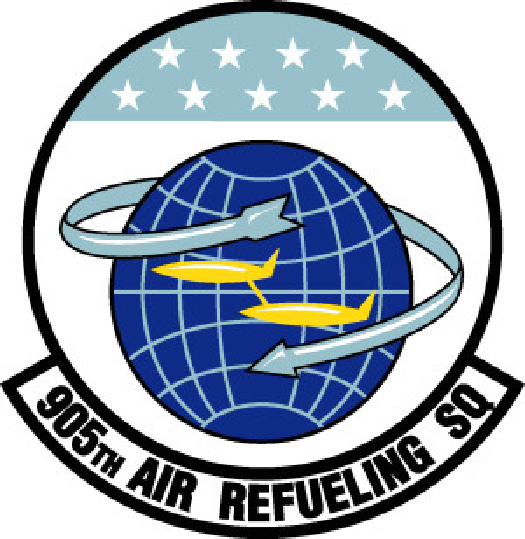
- 905th Air Refueling Squadron emblem (Note: Approved 25 March 1963. Description: On a White disc bordered Black, a Light Blue chief spattered with White stars above an Air Force Blue globe, grid lines Light Blue; surmounting the globe two Air Force Golden Yellow aircraft fesswise in a refueling operation; encircling the globe a Light Blue arrow; highlights on aircraft and arrow White.)

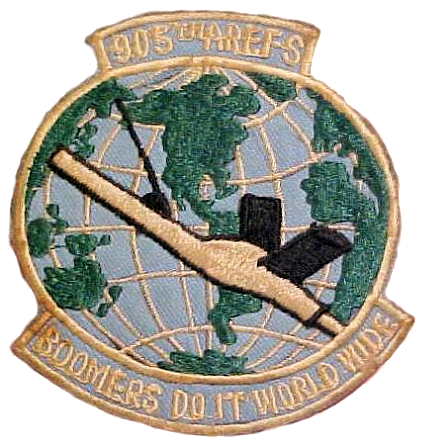
- Patch with first 905th Air Refueling Squadron emblem

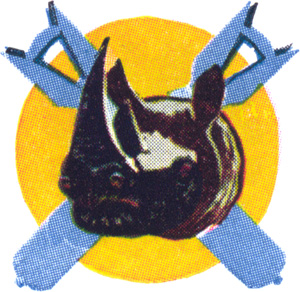
- 505th Bombardment Sq emblem (Note: Approved 22 November 1942. Description: Over and through a yellow disc, two light turquoise blue aerial bombs in saltire, surmounted by the head of a rhinoceros, proper.)

The 905th Air Refueling Squadron is a United States Air Force Reserve unit. It is presently active as an element of the 931st Air Refueling Wing at McConnell Air Force Base, Kansas. The squadron was previously inactivated at the end of 2010 when the 319th Air Refueling Wing at Grand Forks Air Force Base lost its operational mission and became the 319th Air Base Wing.

The first predecessor of the squadron was the 505th Bombardment Squadron, which was activated during World War II and served as a Replacement Training Unit until it was inactivated when the Army Air Forces reorganized its training units into Army Air Forces Base Units.

The 905th was organized under Strategic Air Command in 1960 at Grand Forks, where it served as an air refueling unit for the next fifty years under SAC and Air Mobility Command. From 1960 through 1991 the squadron maintained aircraft on alert, prepared to launch in the event the United States went to war. The squadron also refueled Boeing B-52 Stratofortress bombers flying airborne alert and deployed tankers and crews to the Pacific during the Vietnam War. In 1985 the two squadrons were consolidated.

In 1992 the squadron became an element of Air Mobility Command. It continued to support contingency operations in Bosnia and Herzegovina, Iraq, and Afghanistan until it was inactivated.

== History ==
=== World War II ===
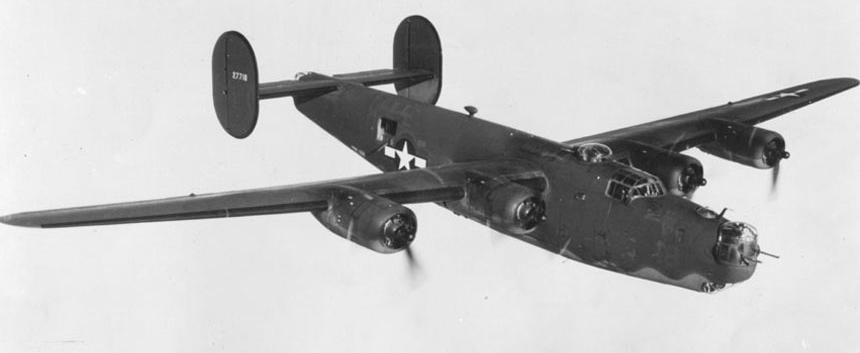
B-24 Liberator as used by the squadron to train replacements

The first predecessor of the squadron was the 505th Bombardment Squadron, which was activated in September 1942 at Salt Lake City Army Air Base as one of the original four squadrons of the 346th Bombardment Group. The following month, the squadron moved to Smoky Hill Army Air Field, Kansas, where it briefly acted as a Consolidated B-24 Liberator Operational Training Unit (OTU). The OTU program involved the use of an oversized parent unit to provide cadres to "satellite groups." In November, its mission changed to that of a Replacement Training Unit (RTU). RTUs were also oversized units, but their mission was to train individual pilots or aircrews.

The 505th continued as an RTU until about October 1943. However, the Army Air Forces found that standard military units, based on relatively inflexible tables of organization, were proving less well adapted to the training mission. Accordingly, it adopted a more functional system in which each base was organized into a separate numbered unit, while the groups and squadrons acting as RTUs were disbanded or inactivated. This resulted in the 505th, along with other units at Dyersburg Army Air Base, being inactivated in the spring of 1944 and replaced by the 223d AAF Base Unit (Combat Crew Training Station (Bombardment, Heavy)), which assumed the unit's mission, personnel, and equipment.

Although the 346th group was reactivated in August 1944 as a Boeing B-29 Superfortress unit, it was assigned three new squadrons and the 505th remained inactive until it was consolidated with the 905th in 1985.

=== Air Refueling under Strategic Air Command ===
In 1959 the Air Force assigned the 905th Air Refueling Squadron to Strategic Air Command (SAC), which organized it at Grand Forks Air Force Base, North Dakota in early 1960, where it was assigned to the 4133d Strategic Wing. The 905th was the first Air Force flying unit to be assigned to Grand Forks. The squadron received its first Boeing KC-135A Stratotanker on 6 May 1960 and began to fly global refueling sorties.

The 4133d wing was established by SAC in a program to disperse its Boeing B-52 Stratofortress bombers over a larger number of bases, thus making it more difficult for the Soviet Union to knock out the entire fleet with a surprise first strike. Half of the wing's aircraft were maintained on fifteen-minute alert, fully fueled and ready for combat. The 4133d (and later the 319th) continued to maintain an alert commitment until the end of the Cold War. The 905th also refueled B-52s participating in Operation Chrome Dome, the airborne component of SAC's alert force until Chrome Dome was terminated in 1968. The squadron's ground alert commitment was increased in the fall of 1962 during the Cuban Missile Crisis, when all available aircraft assumed an alert status.

The squadron transferred to the 319th Bombardment Wing in 1963 when SAC replaced its Major Command controlled (MAJCON) strategic wings with wings carrying the honors of World War II organizations. The squadron supported combat operations in Southeast Asia from 1965 to 1975, supporting PACAF fighters participating in Operation Rolling Thunder, the bombing campaign against North Vietnam. The squadron also deployed elements as part of Operation Young Tiger, which provided tanker support from Thailand. Operating from its home station, the unit refueled the SAC airborne command post, code named Looking Glass.

As the war in Southeast Asia wound down, the squadron once more focused on training for strategic missions. In 1985, the 505th Bombardment Squadron was consolidated with the 905th. In 1986 the 319th wing's last B-52 left Grand Forks, and the following year the 905th began to support the wing's newly assigned B-1A Lancers. 1987 also marked the squadron's upgrade from the KC-135A to the re-engined KC-135R

In December 1989, the squadron flew missions during Operation Just Cause, the American operation to oust Manuel Noriega from power in Panama. (Note: The Air Force Historical Research Agency factsheet for the squadron does not reflect the award of the Armed Forces Expeditionary Medal to the squadron for this operation. However, squadron members were awarded the decoration. "Abstract, Vol. 1 History 319 Bombardment Wing Jan–Jun 1990". Air Force History Index.) The efforts of the 905th enabled aeromedical evacuation missions to be flown directly to medical facilities in the United States from Panama.

The squadron provided personnel and aircraft for air refueling operations in Southwest Asia from 13 August 1990 to 9 April 1991. On 29 September 1991, as the United States reduced its nuclear alert force following the signing of the Strategic Arms Reduction Treaty, the squadron ended thirty years of alert duty with SAC.

=== Air Refueling under Air Mobility Command ===
In 1992 the air force reorganized its major commands. As a result, the 905th's parent 319th Operations Group was reassigned to Air Combat Command as a bomber unit, while the 905th became an element of Air Mobility Command (AMC) and was assigned as a geographically separated unit to the 305th Operations Group, stationed at Grissom Air Force Base, Indiana. The following year it was transferred to the 43d Operations Group at Malmstrom Air Force Base, Montana, when Grissom closed. This assignment was short-lived, however, because the 319th wing lost its B-1s and became an air refueling wing in December 1993 and the 905th was once more part of its operations group.

Under AMC control, the unit supported Operation Deny Flight, the no-fly zone over Bosnia and Herzegovina in 1994 and 1995 from Pisa Airport, Italy and Istres Air Base, France. It supported Operation Uphold Democracy, the United States action to remove the military junta and restore the elected president of Haiti in 1995. In 1996 the squadron deployed planes and crews to Riyadh Air Base, Saudi Arabia for Operation Southern Watch, the Southwest Asia Task Force operation to monitor and control airspace in southern Iraq, as an element of Air Expeditionary Force III. It also deployed for the sister operation patrolling northern Iraq, Operation Northern Watch.

The squadron was named the best air refueling squadron in AMC in 1997, being awarded the Spaatz Trophy. After 1998, the unit participated in Operation Joint Forge, the North Atlantic Treaty Organization to provide stability in Bosnia and Herzegovina.

For three months in the summer of 2000, the squadron was forced to operate from MacDill Air Force Base, Florida as the Grand Forks runways underwent a nine million dollar renovation. For the first time in ten years, following the 9/11 attacks, the squadron once again placed aircraft on alert as part of Operation Noble Freedom and also began support for Operation Enduring Freedom in Afghanistan. Toward the end of the following year, the squadron began to deploy forward in what became Operation Iraqi Freedom, the war in Iraq.

The last squadron KC-135 departed Grand Forks on 6 December 2010. At the end of the year the squadron inactivated as AMC ended air refueling operations at Grand Forks and the 319th became a housekeeping unit for the base in preparation for the arrival of Global Hawk unmanned aircraft.

The 905th ARS was transferred to the 931st Air Refueling Wing at McConnell AFB, Kansas, and reactivated on 14 May 2019. The squadron was assigned the KC-46A Pegasus.

== Lineage ==
505th Bombardment Squadron

- Constituted as the 505th Bombardment Squadron (Heavy) on 3 September 1942

Activated on 7 September 1942
Inactivated on 1 April 1944

- Consolidated on 19 September 1985 with the 905th Air Refueling Squadron as the 905th Air Refueling Squadron

905th Air Refueling Squadron

Constituted and activated as the 905th Air Refueling Squadron, Heavy on 12 October 1959 (not organized)
Organized on 1 February 1960

- Consolidated on 19 September 1985 with the 505th Bombardment Squadron

Redesignated 905th Air Refueling Squadron on 1 September 1991

- Inactivated on 31 December 2010
- Reactivated on 14 May 2019

=== Assignments ===
- 346th Bombardment Group, 7 September 1942 – 1 April 1944
- Strategic Air Command, 12 October 1959 (not organized)
- 4133d Strategic Wing, 1 February 1960
- 319th Bombardment Wing, 1 February 1963
- 319th Operations Group, 1 September 1991
- 305th Operations Group, 1 June 1992
- 43d Operations Group, 1 July 1993
- 319th Operations Group, 1 October 1993 – 31 December 2010
- 931st Operations Group, 14 May 2019 – Present

=== Bases stationed ===
- Salt Lake City Army Air Base, Utah, 7 September 1942
- Smoky Hill Army Air Field, Kansas, 3 October 1942
- Dyersburg Army Air Base, Tennessee, 26 February 1943 – 1 April 1944
- Grand Forks Air Force Base, North Dakota, 1 February 1960 – 31 December 2010
- McConnell Air Force Base, Kansas, 14 May 2019 – Present

=== Aircraft operated ===
- Consolidated B-24 Liberator (1942–1943)
- Boeing KC-135A Stratotanker (1960–1987)
- Boeing KC-135R Stratotanker (1987–2018)
- Boeing KC-46A Pegasus (2019–Present)

=== Awards and Service Streamer ===
Award streamer	Award	Dates	Notes
	Air Force Outstanding Unit Award	1 July 1977 – 30 June 1979	905th Air Refueling Squadron
	Air Force Outstanding Unit Award	30 May 1990 – 29 May 1992	905th Air Refueling Squadron
	Air Force Outstanding Unit Award	1 July 1992 – 30 June 1994	905th Air Refueling Squadron
	Air Force Outstanding Unit Award	1 July 1994 – 30 June 1995	905th Air Refueling Squadron
	Air Force Outstanding Unit Award	1 July 1995 – 30 June 1997	905th Air Refueling Squadron
	Air Force Outstanding Unit Award	1 July 1998 – 30 June 2000	905th Air Refueling Squadron
	Air Force Outstanding Unit Award	1 July 2000–30 June 2002	905th Air Refueling Squadron
	Air Force Outstanding Unit Award	1 July 2002–30 June 2004	905th Air Refueling Squadron
	Air Force Outstanding Unit Award	1 July 2004–30 June 2005	905th Air Refueling Squadron
	Air Force Outstanding Unit Award	1 July 2005–30 June 2006	905th Air Refueling Squadron
	Air Force Outstanding Unit Award	1 July 2006–30 June 2007	905th Air Refueling Squadron
	Air Force Outstanding Unit Award	1 July 2007–30 June 2009	905th Air Refueling Squadron

Service Streamer	Campaign	Dates	Notes
	American Theater without campaign credit	7 September 1942 – 1 April 1944	505th Bombardment Squadron

== See also ==
- List of United States Air Force air refueling squadrons
