= Grand Forks Air Force Base =

US Air Force base near Grand Forks, North Dakota, United States

- Near Grand Forks, North Dakota in United States of America
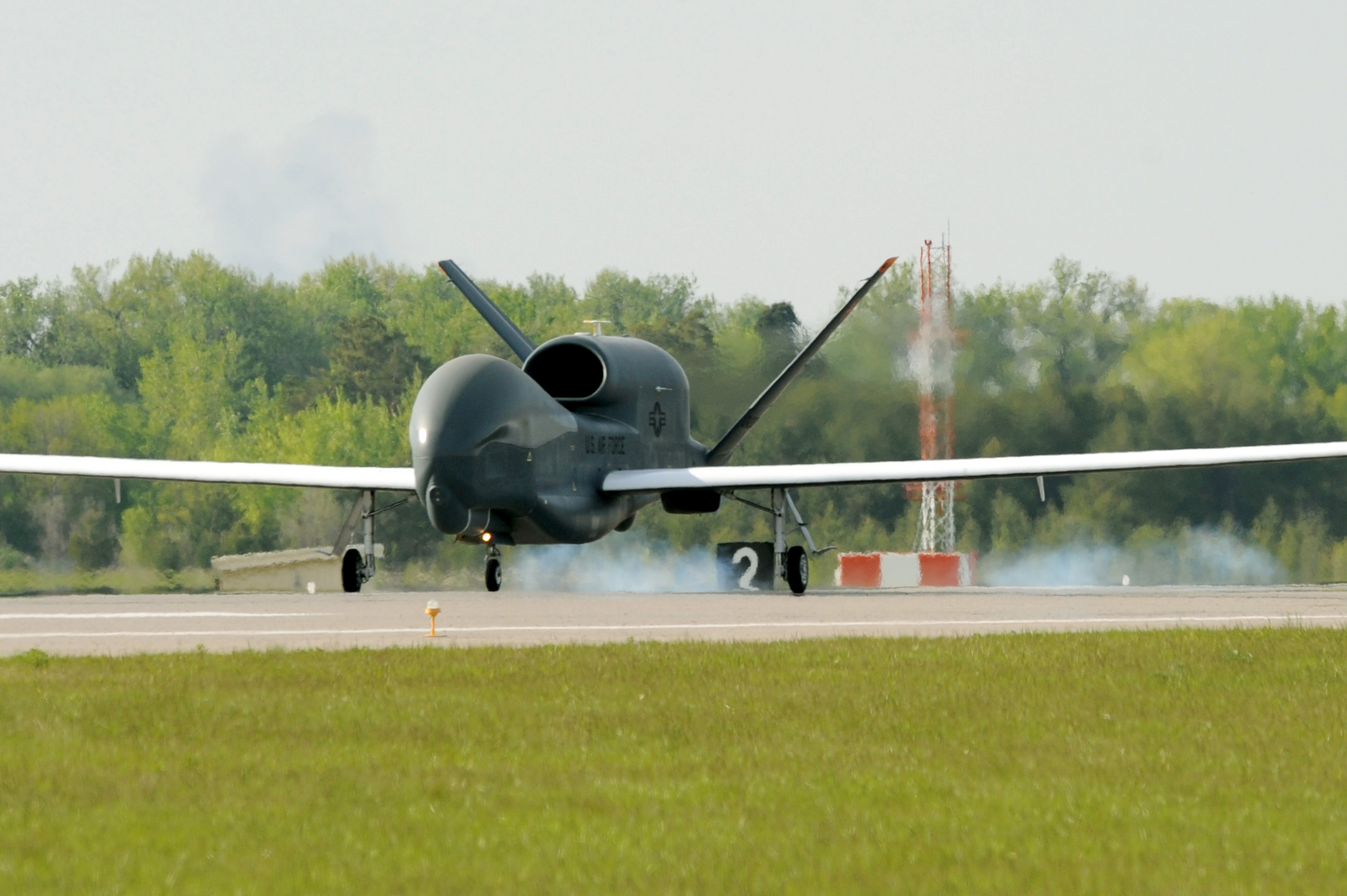
- Arrival of the first Northrop Grumman RQ-4 Global Hawk at Grand Forks AFB in May 2011

Site information
- Type: US Air Force Base
- Owner: Department of Defense
- Operator: US Air Force
- Controlled by: Air Combat Command (ACC)
- Condition: Operational
- Website: www.grandforks.af.mil/

Location
- Shown in North Dakota Grand Forks AFB (the United States)
- Coordinates: 47°57′50″N 097°24′04″W

Site history
- Built: 1955 – 1957
- In use: 1957 – present

Garrison information
- Garrison: 319th Reconnaissance Wing

Airfield information
- Identifiers: IATA: RDR, ICAO: KRDR, FAA LID: RDR, WMO: 727575
- Elevation: 277.6 metres (911 ft) AMSL
Runways
Direction	Length and surface
17/35	3,764.5 metres (12,351 ft) asphalt

Grand Forks Air Force Base (AFB) (IATA: RDR, ICAO: KRDR, FAA LID: RDR) is a United States Air Force installation in northeastern North Dakota, located north of Emerado and 16 miles (26 km) west of Grand Forks.

The host unit is the 319th Reconnaissance Wing (319 RW) assigned to the Air Combat Command (ACC) operating E/RQ-4B Global Hawk remotely piloted aircraft (RPA), in the intelligence, surveillance and reconnaissance (ISR) role. During the Cold War, GFAFB was a major installation of the Strategic Air Command (SAC), with B-52 bombers, KC-135 tankers, and Minuteman intercontinental ballistic missiles.

== History ==
Grand Forks Air Force Base was established on 1 December 1955, with construction beginning in the fall of that year. It was occupied for use on 28 January 1957, and was named after the neighboring city of Grand Forks.

=== Air Defense Command ===
Due to the continuance of the Cold War between the United States and the Soviet Union, GFAFB was originally an Air Defense Command (ADC) fighter-interceptor air base. The site was chosen in 1954 and the land was paid for by the citizens of Grand Forks, the site was located 15 miles (24 km) west of the city. The beginning of the 5,400-acre (22 km^{2}) air base started in 1956 with the construction of a 12,300-foot (3,750 m) runway.

On 18 February 1957, the 478th Fighter Group (Defense) was activated at Grand Forks. The 18th Fighter-Interceptor Squadron was moved from Wurtsmith AFB, Michigan on 1 May 1960, and flew the F-101B Voodoo until 15 April 1971, when it was inactivated and the Voodoos were retired. It was replaced by the 460th FIS, moved from Kingsley Field at Klamath Falls, Oregon. The 460th FIS flew F-106 Delta Darts until it also was inactivated on 15 July 1974.

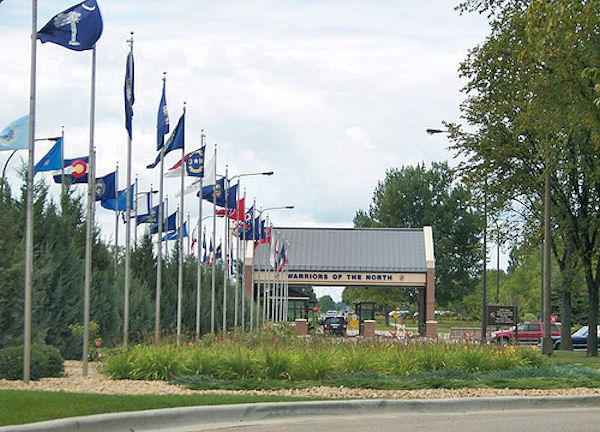
Main gate at Grand Forks AFB

In addition to the interceptor squadrons, a Semi Automatic Ground Environment (SAGE) Data Center (DC-11) was established at Grand Forks in 1958. The SAGE system was a network linking Air Force (and later FAA) General Surveillance Radar stations into a centralized center for Air Defense, intended to provide early warning and response for a Soviet nuclear attack. DC-11 was operated by the Grand Forks Air Defense Sector (GFADS), activated on 8 December 1957 under the 31st Air Division at Snelling AFS, Minnesota. On 1 January 1959, GFADS was transferred to the operational control of the 29th Air Division at Malmstrom AFB at Great Falls, Montana.

SAGE operations were extremely expansive and GFADS was inactivated on 1 December 1963, when it was merged with the Minot Air Defense Sector at Minot AFB to the west. With the inactivation of DC-11, Grand Forks AFB was reassigned from the Air Defense mission to Strategic Air Command (SAC).

In 1971, the 18th Fighter-Interceptor Squadron was inactivated and the 460th Fighter-Interceptor Squadron replaced the unit. Although the 460th FIS won first place at the William Tell air-to-air competition at Tyndall AFB, Florida, it was inactivated in 1974 due to the restructuring of the air defense system, and ended the activities of ADCOM at Grand Forks.

The DC-11 SAGE blockhouse was later the headquarters of the SAC 321st Strategic Missile Wing. Following the end of Minuteman III missile operations in 1998, the large SAGE blockhouse was torn down five years later, in June 2003.

=== Safeguard Anti-Ballistic Missile ===
On 3 November 1967, the Department of Defense revealed that GFAFB was one of 10 initial locations to host a Sentinel Anti-Ballistic Missile (ABM) site. With president Richard Nixon's announcement of 14 March 1969, constructing a "Safeguard" installation at Grand Forks became a top priority. Construction was stalled throughout mid-1969, as Congress debated the merits of BMD. After the Senate defeated amendments to kill Safeguard deployment, the U.S. Army proceeded under the assumption that appropriations would be forthcoming.

Survey teams selected sites in flat wheatlands close to the Canada-Minnesota border, north-northwest of Grand Forks. Twenty-five miles (40 km) separated the 113-hectare (279-acre) Perimeter Acquisition Radar (PAR) and the 175-hectare (433-acre) Missile Site Radar (MSR) sites. Four remote launch sites of 36 to 45 acres (15 to 18 ha) each were to be situated in a circle with a 20-mile (32 km) radius surrounding the MSR. Groundbreaking occurred at the PAR and MSR sites on 6 April 1970. Excavation proceeded rapidly, and the foundation holes for the PAR and MSR were in place by mid-May.

On 26 May 1972, President Nixon and Soviet general secretary Leonid Brezhnev signed the ABM Treaty, which limited each nation to one site to protect strategic forces and one site to protect the "National Command Authority." With work about 85% complete at Grand Forks, the US chose to finish construction at the North Dakota site. On 21 August 1972, the Army Corps of Engineers turned over the PAR to the Safeguard Systems Command (SAFSCOM) Site Activation Team. The transfer of the MSR occurred on 3 January 1973. Work on the four remote launch sites fell behind schedule, with the last completed on 5 November 1972. Testing of the PAR commenced during the summer of 1973.

On 3 September 1974, the SAFSCOM Site Activation Team was relieved by the U.S. Army Safeguard Command. Named the "Stanley R. Mickelsen Safeguard Complex" 48°35′21″N 098°21′24″W (62.3 miles (100 km) northwest of the base), the North Dakota ABM site received its complement of nuclear-tipped LIM-49 Spartan and Sprint Missiles during the following spring. The site was declared operational on 1 April 1975. Due to Congressional action, the Army operated the site for less than a year. With the exception of the PAR, the complex was abandoned in February 1976.

In October 1977, the PAR came under operational control of the USAF, which operated it as part of its early warning system. It was designated as Cavalier AFS 48°43′29″N 097°53′58″W (57.8 miles (93 km) north-northwest of the base), and remains active. It is operated by the Air Force Space Command 10th Space Warning Squadron (10th SWS).

=== Strategic Air Command ===
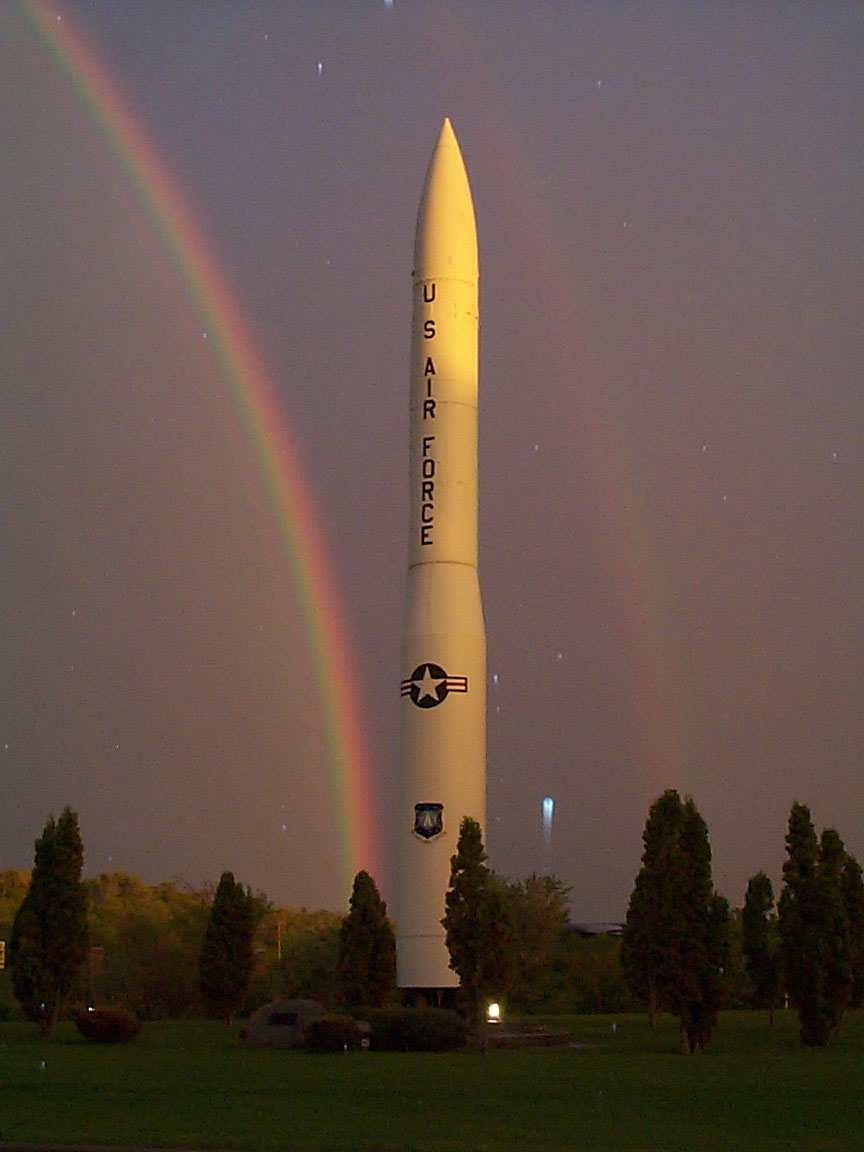
Minuteman III missile at GFAFB entrance

On 1 September 1958, the Strategic Air Command (SAC) established the 4133d Strategic Wing at Grand Forks as part of its plan to disperse its B-52 heavy bombers over a larger number of bases, thus making it more difficult for the Soviet Union to knock out the entire fleet with a surprise first strike. Many of these bases were near the U.S. border with Canada; those close to GFAFB in the north central U.S. were Minot and Glasgow to the west, and three in Michigan to the east (Sawyer, Kinchloe, and Wurtsmith).

The 4133d SW was redesignated as the 319th Bombardment Wing (319th BW) on 1 February 1963 in a name-only redesignation and was assigned to SAC's Second Air Force, 810th Strategic Aerospace Division. Upon redesignation, the wing placed aircraft on peacetime quick reaction alert duty, and conducted global bombardment training for Emergency War Order operations and air refueling operations to meet SAC commitments. The aircraft in the 1960s at GFAFB were the latest models: B-52H bombers and KC-135A tankers.

In 1973, the 319th Bomb Wing acquired the AGM-69 Short Range Attack Missile (SRAM), replacing the older AGM-28 Hound Dog air-to-ground missile aboard its B-52H aircraft. As the activities in Southeast Asia decreased, the 319th BW focused its full efforts on training crews to fly strategic strike missions.

On 1 November 1964, 321st Strategic Missile Wing was organized as the Minuteman II intercontinental ballistic missile (ICBM) wing at GFAFB, the first in SAC.

During 1965, the wing's three missile squadrons were activated and crew training and certification began at Vandenberg AFB in southern California. In August 1965, the base received its first Minuteman II missile, shipped by train from Assembly Plant 77 at Hill AFB at Ogden, Utah. During the following March, the base received the first Minuteman II to be shipped via aircraft, an Air Force first. The Minuteman III replaced the former in the 1970s.

The 319th transitioned from B-52H to B-52G aircraft in 1983 adding the AGM-86 Air Launched Cruise Missile (ALCM) in 1984. In December 1986, the last B-52G permanently departed GFAFB, replaced by the B-1B Lancer in 1987. The tanker aircraft were also changed, from KC-135A to KC-135R. A change in the host unit occurred again in 1988, when the 42d Air Division was assigned for base support in place of the 321st SMW.

==== Cold War aircraft incidents ====
- On 2 November 1967, a Grand Forks B-52H (61-0030) crashed near Griffiss AFB in central New York, killing six of the eight aboard. It had engine difficulties and was attempting an emergency landing.
- On 15 September 1980, a B-52H on alert status experienced a wing fire that burned for three hours, fanned by evening winds of 26 mph (42 km/h). The wind direction was parallel to the fuselage, which likely had SRAMs in the main bay. Eight years later, a weapons expert testified to a closed U.S. Senate hearing that a change of wind direction could have led to a conventional explosion and a widespread scattering of radioactive plutonium.
- Mid-morning on 27 January 1983, a B-52G (57-6507) exploded on the maintenance ramp, killing five maintenance personnel and injuring eight. A faulty fuel pump in a wing tank was being attended to prior to the accident.

==== Media ====
In the 1983 film WarGames, Grand Forks Air Force Base was mentioned as one of the first three targets to be destroyed in the (simulated) full scale Soviet nuclear strike in the climax of the film.

=== The 1990s ===
With the restructuring of the Air Force and the disestablishment of SAC in 1992, the wing transferred to Air Combat Command (ACC), then came under Air Force Space Command (AFSPC) in 1993.

On 1 February 1993, ACC dropped the 319th Bomb Wing's primary nuclear mission and gave the wing the primary mission of B-1B conventional bombardment operations. The 319th BW began planning and training to support such a mission to counter worldwide regional threats.

Following the departure of the last B-1B aircraft in 1994, the base transferred to the new Air Mobility Command (AMC) and the 319th Bomb Wing was redesignated as the 319th Air Refueling Wing (319 ARW). The KC-135R aircraft assets were transferred to AMC, and the strategic ICBM assets went to Air Force Space Command (AFSPC).

In March 1995, the 1995 Base Realignment and Closure Commission (BRAC) selected the 321st Strategic Missile Wing for inactivation; it was first downgraded to group status, then inactivated on 30 September 1998. GFAFB's Minuteman ICBM silos were imploded in accordance with the Strategic Arms Reduction Treaty (START II), commencing in 1999 and completed in 2001. The Minuteman III missiles were transferred to Malmstrom AFB in at Great Falls, Montana, to replace retired Minuteman II models. Minuteman III ICBMs remain at three USAF bases: Malmstrom, Minot, and F.E. Warren at Cheyenne, Wyoming.

=== Twenty-first century ===
In May 2005, DoD's 2005 Base Realignment and Closure Commission recommended that Grand Forks be realigned. The base's KC-135 tanker mission was lost, with a significant reduction of personnel, but it was not closed.

The unmanned RQ-4 Global Hawk was assigned to Grand Forks, and on 1 March 2011, the wing was redesignated as the 319th Air Base Wing (319 ABW). The first RQ-4 arrived in May 2011 and were assigned to the 69th Reconnaissance Group, Air Combat Command. Starting in 2012, the base received several new Block 40 Global Hawks. On 13 June 2017, the 319 ABW transferred from the Air Mobility Command to the Air Combat Command.

On 11 May 2019 Secretary of the Air Force Heather Wilson announced that the 319th Air Base Wing would be re-designated the 319th Reconnaissance Wing in a ceremony on 28 June 2019.

On 28 June 2019 the 319th Air Base Wing was re-designated the 319th Reconnaissance Wing and the 69th Reconnaissance Group inactivated transferring the RQ-4 mission.

=== Major commands to which assigned ===
- Air Defense Command, 25 July 1956
- Strategic Air Command, 1 July 1963
- Air Combat Command, 1 June 1992
- Air Mobility Command, 1 October 1993
- Air Combat Command, 13 June 2017 – present

=== Major units assigned ===
69th Reconnaissance Group – September 2011 – Current (RQ-4)

- 4133d Strategic Wing, 1 September 1958 – 1 February 1963
- 905th Air Refueling Squadron, 1 February 1960 – 1 December 2010
- 319th Bombardment Wing (Heavy), 1 February 1963

Redesignated 319th Air Refueling Wing, 1 October 1993
Redesignated 319th Air Base Wing, 1 March 2011 – 28 June 2019
Redesignated 319th Reconnaissance Wing, 28 June 2019 - Present

- 4th Air Division, 1 September 1964 – 30 June 1971
- 321st Strategic Missile Wing (later Missile Wing, Missile Group), 1 November 1964 – 30 September 1998
- 804th Combat Support Group, 18 August 1964 – 31 July 1972
- Grand Forks Air Defense Sector, 8 December 1957 – 1 December 1963
- 478th Air Base Squadron, 8 February 1957 – 1 February 1961
- 478th Air Base Group, 1 February 1961 – 1 July 1963
- 478th Fighter Group, 8 February 1957 – 1 February 1961

478th Fighter Wing (Air Defense), 1 February 1961 – 1 July 1963

- 18th Fighter-Interceptor Squadron, 1 May 1960 – 15 April 1971 (F-101B)
- 460th Fighter-Interceptor Squadron, 16 April 1971 – 15 July 1974 (F-106)

References for history introduction, major commands and major units

== Based units ==
Flying and notable non-flying units based at Grand Forks Air Force Base:

=== United States Air Force ===
Air Combat Command (ACC)

- Sixteenth Air Force
  - 319th Reconnaissance Wing (Host wing)
    - 319th Comptroller Squadron
    - 319th Operations Group
      - 319th Aircraft Maintenance Squadron
      - 319th Operations Support Squadron
      - 348th Reconnaissance Squadron – E/RQ-4B Global Hawk
    - 319th Medical Group
      - 319th Health Care Operations Squadron
      - 319th Medical Support Squadron
      - 319th Operational Medical Readiness Squadron
    - 319th Mission Support Group
      - 319th Civil Engineer Squadron
      - 319th Communications Squadron
      - 319th Contracting Flight
      - 319th Logistics Readiness Squadron
      - 319th Force Support Squadron
      - 319th Security Forces Squadron

Air Education and Training Command (AETC)

- Second Air Force
  - 82nd Training Wing
    - 982nd Training Group
      - 372nd Training Squadron
        - Detachment 27

Civil Air Patrol (CAP)

- North Central Region
  - North Dakota Wing
    - Grand Forks Composite Squadron (ND-005)

=== United States Customs and Border Protection ===
Air and Marine Operations

- National Air Security Operations Center-Grand Forks – MQ-9 Reaper and various fixed- and rotary-wing aircraft

== Demographics ==
Grand Forks is also a United States Census Bureau designated place.

== Education ==
It is within the Grand Forks AFB Public School District 140. That school district has its own board of trustees and contracts education to the Grand Forks School District. The district, along with the Grand Forks School District, is administered as part of Grand Forks Public Schools. The Grand Forks AFB School District was created in 1990.

Nathan F. Twining Elementary and Middle School, a K-8 school operated by the Grand Forks Public Schools, is on-post. On-post students are zoned to Grand Forks Central High School, which is located off-post.

== Timeline ==
- 1954 The Department of Defense chose Grand Forks as the site for a new installation.
- 5 February 1956 Contractors begin construction of the base.
- 8 February 1957 Air Defense Command (ADC) activated the 478th Fighter Group at Grand Forks AFB as the host unit for the base.
- 1 September 1958 Strategic Air Command (SAC) activated the 4133d Strategic Wing (Provisional) as a tenant unit at Grand Forks AFB.
- 15 December 1959 The Grand Forks Air Defense Sector of the North American Air Defense Command became operational with the Semi Automatic Ground Environment (SAGE) System.
- 1 May 1960 The 18th Fighter-Interceptor Squadron (FIS) was stationed at Grand Forks AFB with its F-101B Voodoos.
- 6 May 1960 The 905th Air Refueling Squadron (ARS) (Heavy), a unit assigned to the 4133d Strategic Wing, received its first KC-135A Stratotanker.
- 28 December 1960 The 478th Fighter Wing was activated under the ADC and became the host unit for the base.
- 29 April 1962 The 30th Bombardment Squadron, a unit assigned to the 4133d Strategic Wing, received its first B-52H Stratofortress.
- 1 February 1963 Strategic Air Command organized the 319th Bombardment Wing (Heavy) at Grand Forks AFB. The 319 BMW became the host wing as the 4133d Strategic Wing inactivated and command of the base transferred from the ADC to SAC.
- 19 August 1964 Strategic Air Command activated the 804th Combat Support Group (CSG) as the host unit at Grand Forks AFB.
- 1 September 1964 Strategic Air Command stationed the 4th Air Division, later named 4th Strategic Aerospace Division, at Grand Fork AFB.
- 1 November 1964 The 321st Strategic Missile Wing (SMW) was organized at Grand Forks AFB and construction began on its Minuteman II missile complex.
- December 1966 The 321 SMW became operational with the Minuteman II missile.
- 15 April 1971 Air Defense Command inactivated 18 FIS.
- 30 June 1971 The 4th Strategic Air Division transferred to Francis E. Warren AFB, Wyoming.
- 1 July 1971 The 321 SMW assumed host unit duties from the 804 CSG.
- 30 July 1971 Air Defense Command stationed the 460th Fighter-Interceptor Squadron, with F-106 Delta Darts, at Grand Forks AFB.
- 8 March 1973 The 321st Strategic Missile Wing completed an upgrade to Minuteman III missiles.
- 1974 The ADC inactivated the 460 FIS.
- 1986–1987 The 319th Bombardment Wing converted from the B-52G Stratofortress and KC-135A Stratotanker to the B-1B Lancer and KC-135R Stratotanker.
- 16 June 1988 Strategic Air Command transferred the 42d Air Division (AD) to Grand Forks as the host support unit for the base.
- 9 July 1991 Strategic Air Command inactivated the 42 AD and appointed the 319th Bombardment Wing as the host unit for the base.
- 1 September 1991 The 319th Bombardment Wing was redesignated as the 319th Wing. The 321st Strategic Missile Wing was redesignated as the 321st Missile Wing (MW).
- 1 June 1992 The Air Force inactivated the Strategic Air Command and reassigned Grand Forks AFB to the Air Combat Command. The 319th Wing was redesignated as the 319th Bomb Wing. The 905 ARS was reassigned to the Grissom AFB, Indiana, although it continued to operate from Grand Forks AFB.
- 1 July 1993 The 321 MW was reassigned to Air Force Space Command.
- 1 October 1993 The Air Force redesignated the 319th Bomb Wing as the 319th Air Refueling Wing, reassigned it to Air Mobility Command, and reassigned the 905th Air Refueling Squadron to the wing.
- 1994 As part of restructuring at Grand Forks the Air Force reassigned the 906th, 911th, and 912th Air Refueling Squadrons to Grand Forks AFB.
- 26 May 1994 The last B-1B Lancer departed from Grand Forks AFB, marking the end of over 30 years of bombers at Grand Forks.
- 1 July 1994 Air Force Space Command redesignated the 321 MW as the 321st Missile Group (MG).
- 1 October 1995 The Clinton Administration approved the Base Realignment and Closure IV committee's recommendation to remove 150 Minuteman III intercontinental ballistic missiles from the Grand Forks Air Force Base missile complex and inactivate the 321st Missile Group.
- April 1997 After a long, harsh winter, the Grand Forks area suffered a devastating flood due to snowmelt and spring rain. Members of the Grand Forks Air Force Base were called into action, first to help protect the town from the rising waters and later to house the victims of the disaster.
- 2 July 1998 The 321st Missile Group inactivated after 34 years of service at Grand Forks AFB.
- 6 October 1999 The first missile silo was demolished in accordance with the Strategic Arms Reduction Treaty (START).
- 4 December 2010 The last KC-135 tail number 00319 piloted by Lt Gen Vern "Rusty" Findley, the AMC Vice Commander and former 319 ARW commander, departed Grand Forks AFB for its new home at McConnell AFB Kansas, marking the end of the 50-year-long refueling mission at Grand Forks.
- 26 May 2011 The wing received its first RQ-4 Global Hawk.

== See also ==
- List of United States Air Force installations
- United States general surveillance radar stations

== Other sources ==
- This article incorporates public domain material from the Air Force Historical Research Agency
- This article incorporates public domain material from Grand Forks Air Force Base. United States Air Force.
- Maurer, Maurer. Air Force Combat Units of World War II. Washington, DC: U.S. Government Printing Office 1961 (republished 1983, Office of Air Force History, ISBN 0-912799-02-1).
- Ravenstein, Charles A. Air Force Combat Wings Lineage and Honors Histories 1947–1977. Maxwell Air Force Base, Alabama: Office of Air Force History 1984. ISBN 0-912799-12-9.
- Mueller, Robert, Air Force Bases Volume I, Active Air Force Bases Within the United States of America on 17 September 1982, Office of Air Force History, 1989
- A Handbook of Aerospace Defense Organization 1946–1980, by Lloyd H. Cornett and Mildred W. Johnson, Office of History, Aerospace Defense Center, Peterson Air Force Base, Colorado
- Winkler, David F. (1997), Searching the skies: the legacy of the United States Cold War defense radar program. Prepared for United States Air Force Headquarters Air Combat Command.
- Grand Forks AFB, ND
