= 18th Fighter Interceptor Squadron =

18th Fighter Interceptor Squadron

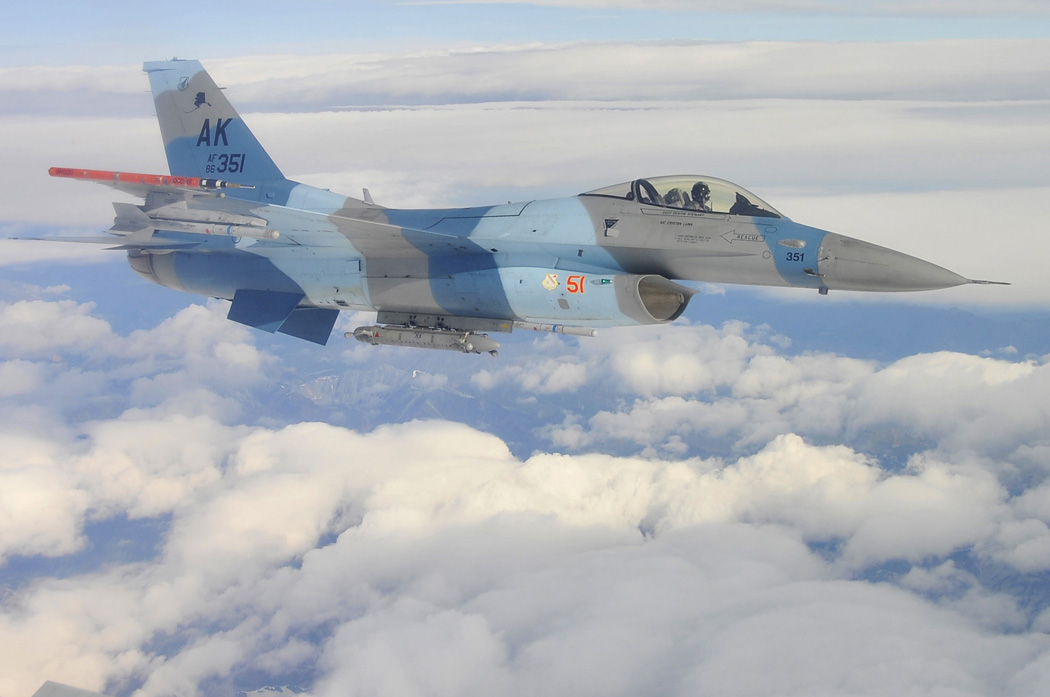
- 18th Aggressor Squadron F-16 Fighting Falcon (Note: Aircraft is General Dynamics F-16C Serial 86-0351)
- Active: 1940–1946; 1952–1971; 1977–present
- Country: United States
- Branch: United States Air Force
- Role: Interceptor
- Part of: Pacific Air Forces: Eleventh Air Force; 354th Fighter Wing; 354th Operations Group
- Garrison/HQ: Eielson Air Force Base, Alaska
- Nickname: Blue Foxes
- Engagements: World War II – Asiatic–Pacific Theater: Aleutian Islands Campaign

- Decorations: Air Force Outstanding Unit Award

Insignia
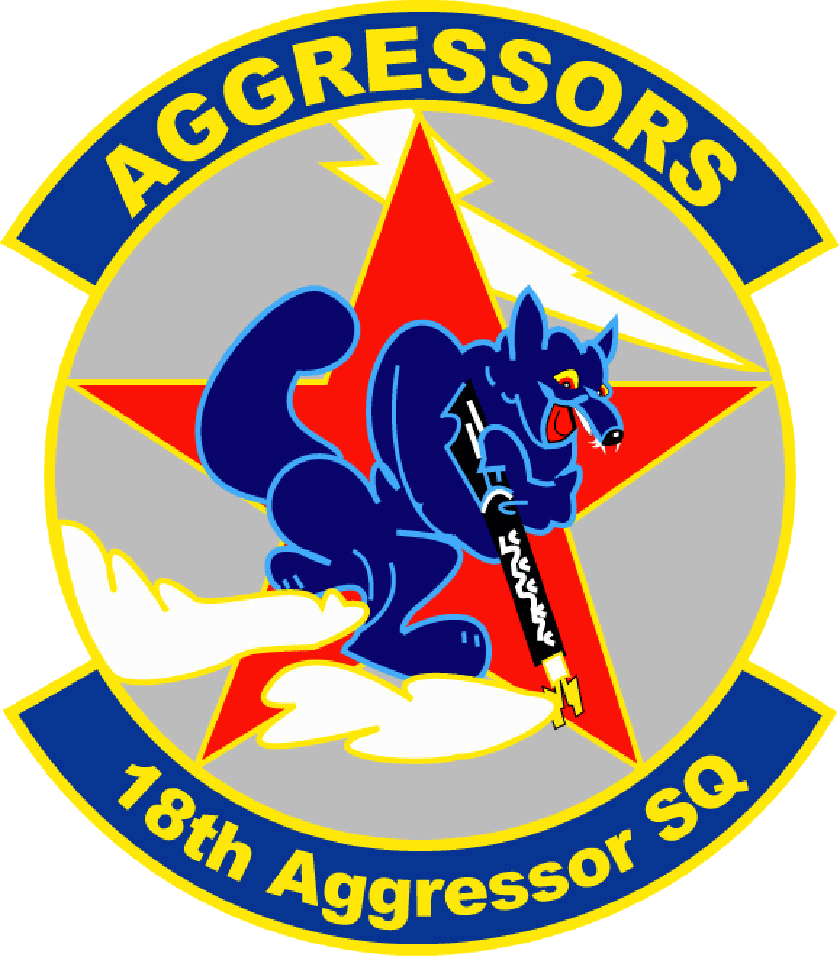
- 18th Aggressor Squadron emblem

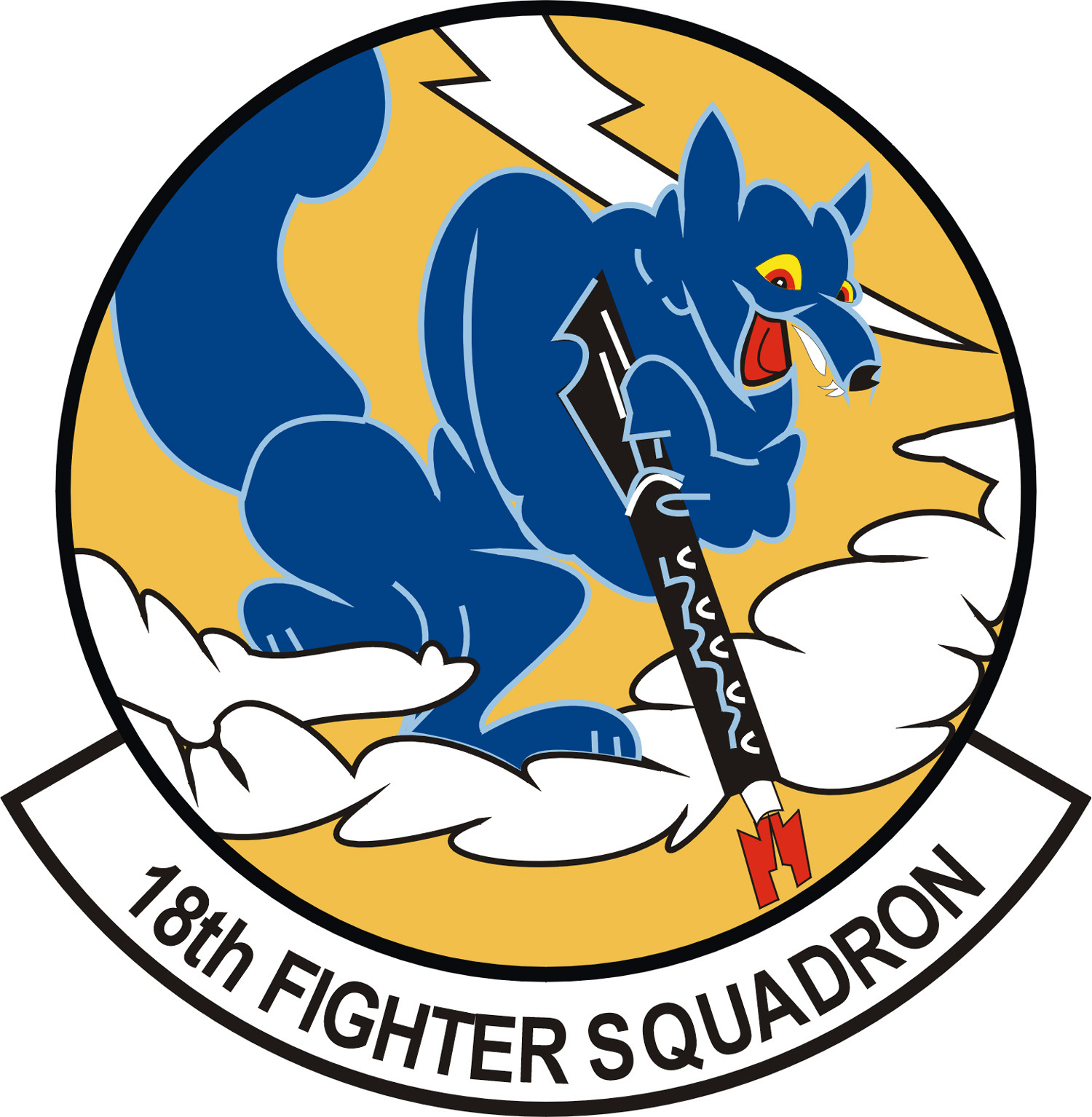
- 18th Fighter Squadron emblem (Note: This emblem was approved 10 November 1944. It was replaced on 15 March 1978, but reinstated in November 1995. AFHRA Factsheet 18 Fighter Squadron)

The 18th Fighter Interceptor Squadron (18th FIS) is a subordinate unit of the 354th Fighter Wing based at Eielson Air Force Base in Alaska, and flies the Block 30 General Dynamics F-16C/D aircraft.

== Mission ==
The 18th Fighter Interceptor Squadron provides aerospace control for homeland defense missions in the Alaska Theater of Operations.

== History ==
Activated in 1940 as a Southwest Air District pursuit squadron, equipped with a variety of 1930s-era pursuit aircraft. Re-equipped with P-38 Lightning fighters and deployed to Alaska, engaged in combat during the Aleutian Campaign, 1942–1943. Remained in Alaska as part of the air defense forces until inactivated in August 1946.

=== Air Defense Command ===
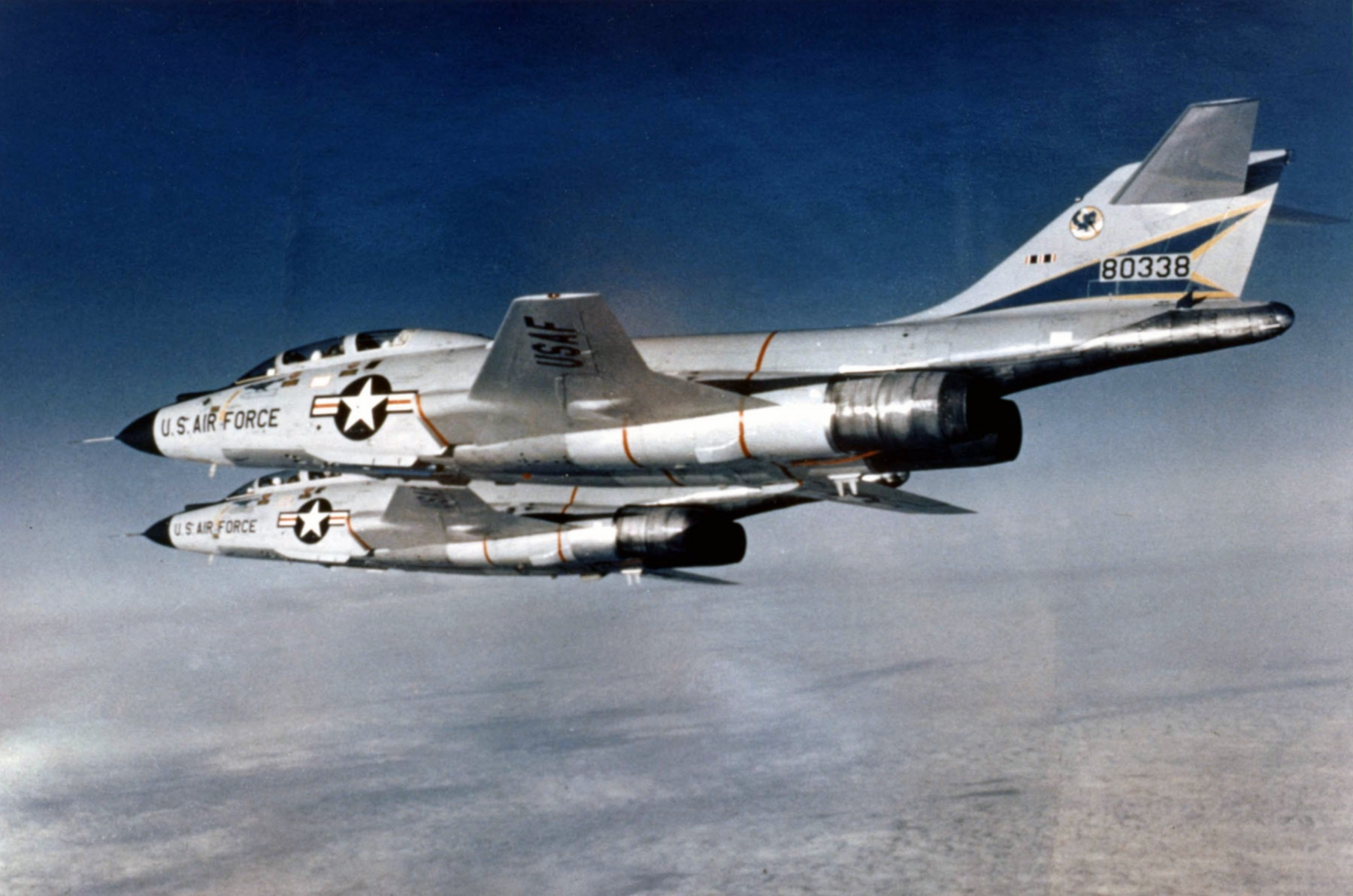
Two 18th FIS F-101s in the 1960s.

Reactivated in 1952 as part of Air Defense Command as an air defense squadron, initially equipped with F-86A Sabre day fighters, initially being assigned to Minneapolis Airport, Minnesota with a mission for the air defense of the Upper Great Lakes region. Re-equipped in 1954 with F-89D Scorpions and moved to Ladd AFB, Alaska for interceptor duty in the Fairbanks area as part of Alaskan Air Command. Returned to the CONUS in 1957 and upgraded to F-102 Delta Dagger interceptors at the new Wurtsmith Air Force Base, Michigan.

Reassigned to Grand Forks AFB, North Dakota in 1960 and received the new McDonnell F-101B Voodoo supersonic interceptor, and the F-101F operational and conversion trainer. The two-seat trainer version was equipped with dual controls, but carried the same armament as the F-101B and were fully combat-capable. Inactivated in April 1971 as part of the drawdown of ADC interceptor bases, the aircraft being passed along to the Air National Guard.

=== Modern era ===
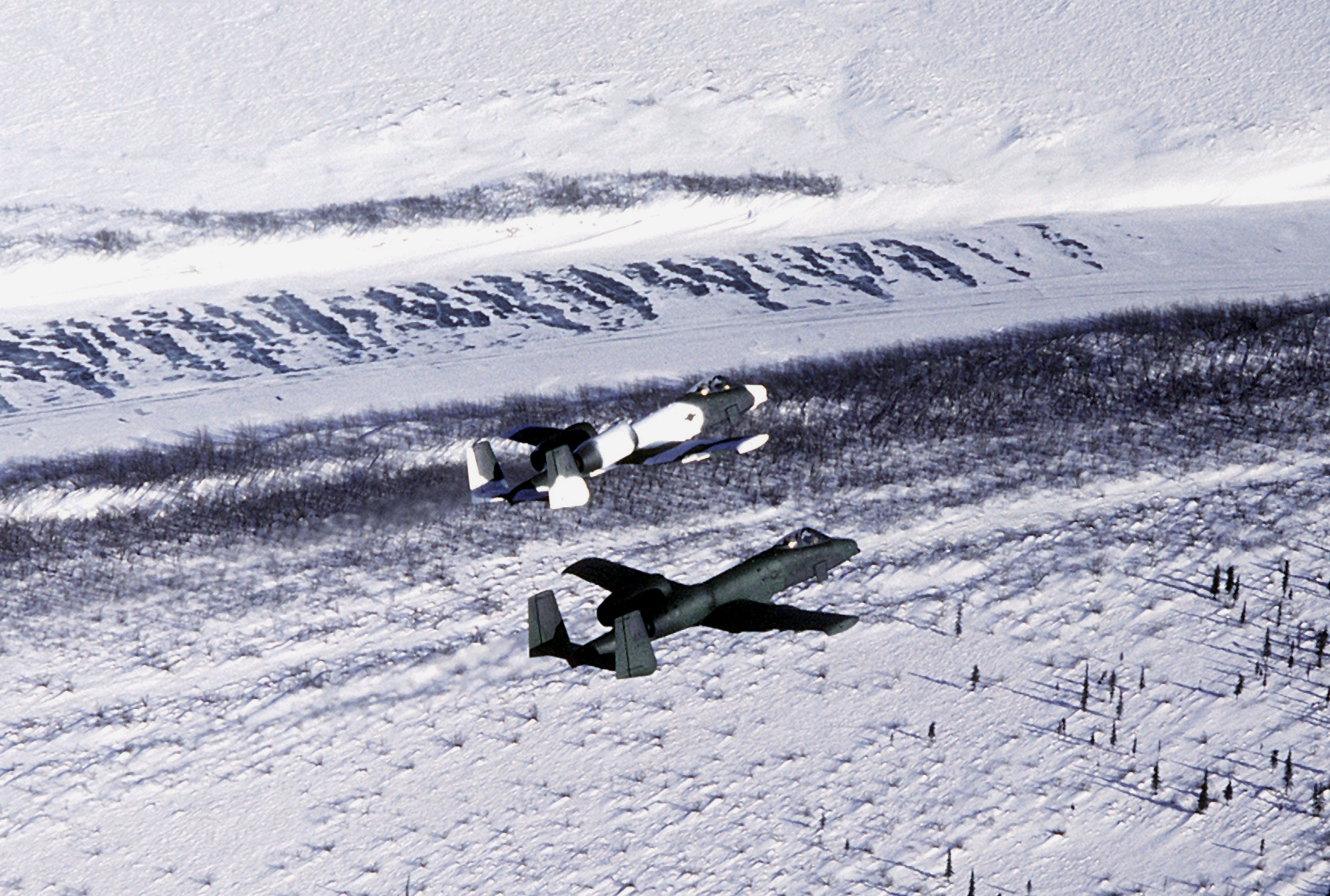
18th TFS A-10As in 1982

On 1 October 1977 the squadron was reactivated under the 343rd Tactical Fighter Group, assigned to the 21st Composite Wing of Alaskan Air Command flying the McDonnell Douglas F-4E Phantom II at Elmendorf AFB, Alaska. The squadron specialized in air-to-ground operations within the 21st Composite Wing. The squadron moved to Eielson AFB, Alaska at the end of 1981 and began converting to the Fairchild Republic A-10A Thunderbolt II.

From 1981 to 1991 the squadron conducted air-to-ground operations with the A-10, assigned to the 343rd Tactical Fighter Wing before converting to the Lockheed Martin F-16 Fighting Falcon.

In 1991, the squadron converted to the Lockheed Martin F-16 Fighting Falcon. In 1997, elements of the 18th FS deployed to Singapore and Malaysia to take part in dissimilar air combat tactic training as part of Exercises Commando Sling and Cope Taufan, respectively. The Cope Taufan deployment marked the first time Pacific Air Forces' F-16s had flown against MiG-29s. The unit deployed to Ahmad al-Jaber Air Base, Kuwait, October–December 1998 to support Operation Southern Watch. Later, the squadron deployed to Incirlik Air Base, Turkey, September–December 2000, in support of Operation Northern Watch. For this deployment, the squadron employed 5 F-16 aircraft and 110 personnel, conducting the first ever Combat Search and Rescue support tasking for an F-16 squadron. After the 11 September 2001 attacks, the 18th FS was called to provide eight aircraft for Alaska NORAD air defense during Operation NOBLE EAGLE, though the aircraft were not launched.

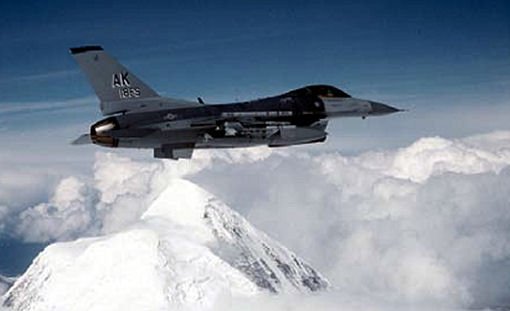
18th Fighter Squadron F-16 flying over the Alaska Range (Note: Aircraft is F-16C Block 40H Serial 90-718.)

The squadron's next deployment was to Ahmed Al Jaber Air Base from December 2001 to March 2002 to support simultaneous combat operations for Operations Southern Watch and Operation Enduring Freedom. They flew more than 3,200 hours in only 3 months, an amazing feat for the 142 Blue Foxes who deployed with only 10 aircraft. During that time, the 18th FS flew missions in support of Operation Anaconda, including one in the Shah-i-Kot Valley on 2 March when U.S. forces, engaged in a firefight with Taliban and Al Qaeda forces, called for aerial assistance. A number of Blue Foxes responded, dropping bombs with pinpoint accuracy on the opposing forces. Lt. Col. Burt Bartley, the 18 FS commander at the time, received the Silver Star for strafing and dropping 500 lbs Laser-guided bombs on what would later be known as "The Battle for Roberts Ridge".

The squadron deployed to Andersen Air Force Base, Guam in support of Operation Noble Eagle during March 2003. The unit also participated in Exercise Commando Sling in October 2003.

=== Red Flag – Alaska ===
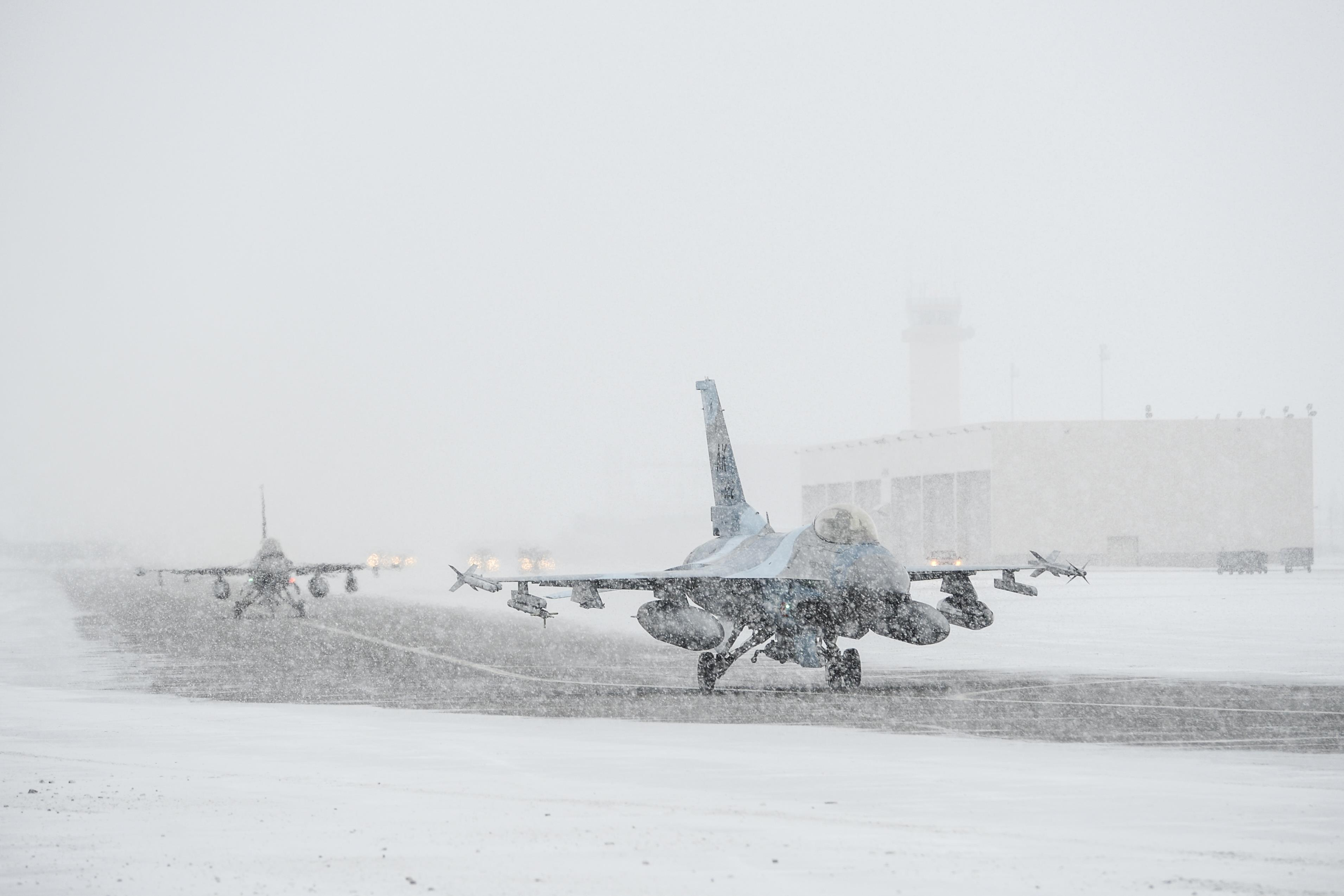
18th Aggressor Squadron F-16 Fighting Falcons taxi at Eielson Air Force Base, Alaska

As part of the change from COPE THUNDER to Red Flag-Alaska, the 18th FS was re-designated the 18th Aggressor Squadron. The squadron trains in the same manner as the aggressors at Nellis Air Force Base, learning the flying styles and abilities of foreign air forces in order to train USAF pilots against realistic opposition. Aircraft changes entail sending all 18 of its Block 40 F-16 Fighting Falcons to Kunsan Air Base, Korea, and receiving 18 Block 30 F-16s from Kunsan.

In 2013, the Air Force, responding to the Department of Defense strategy guidance of December 2012, proposed consolidating all fighter units in Alaska at Joint Base Elmendorf-Richardson. This would involve the move of the 18th from Eielson Air Force Base to Elmendorf. While the move was pending, in response to the sequestration of defense funds, the squadron's aircraft were grounded in the middle of April for a period of three months. The squadron move was strongly opposed by civic leaders from both Fairbanks and Anchorage, Alaska. The civic leaders were joined by the Alaska congressional delegation, who wrote language barring the use of funds in the Defense Appropriations Bill to move the squadron, and delayed the promotion of a lieutenant general until the Air Force addressed their questions concerning the move. The widespread opposition in Alaska to the squadron's move caused the Department of Defense to withdraw its recommendation and leave the squadron at Eielson.

== Lineage ==
- Constituted 18th Pursuit Squadron (Interceptor) on 22 December 1939

Activated on 1 February 1940
Redesignated 18th Fighter Squadron on 15 May 1942
Redesignated 18th Fighter Squadron, Single Engine on 20 August 1943
Redesignated 18th Fighter Squadron, Two Engine on 6 March 1945
Inactivated on 15 August 1946

- Redesignated 18th Fighter-Interceptor Squadron on 10 October 1952

Activated on 1 December 1952
Inactivated on 15 April 1971

- Redesignated 18th Tactical Fighter Squadron on 19 September 1977

Activated on 1 October 1977
Redesignated 18th Fighter Squadron on 1 July 1991
Redesignated 18th Aggressor Squadron on 1 October 2007
Redesignated 18th Fighter Interceptor Squadron on 2 February 2024

=== Assignments ===
- 35th Pursuit Group, 1 February 1940
- 28th Composite Group, c. 24 February 1941
- XI Fighter Command, 7 June 1942
- 343d Fighter Group, 11 September 1942 – 15 August 1946
- 31st Air Division, 1 December 1952
- 514th Air Defense Group, 16 February 1953
- 11th Air Division, 1 September 1954
- 5001st Air Defense Group, 20 September 1954
- 11th Air Division, 1 October 1955
- 412th Fighter Group, 20 August 1957
- 30th Air Division, 1 April 1960
- 478th Fighter Group, 1 May 1960
- 478th Fighter Wing, 1 February 1961
- Grand Forks Air Defense Sector, 1 July 1963
- Duluth Air Defense Sector, 4 September 1963
- 29th Air Division, 1 April 1966
- 28th Air Division, 15 September 1969
- 24th Air Division, 19 November 1969 – 15 April 1971
- 21st Composite Wing, 1 October 1977
- 343d Tactical Fighter Group, 15 November 1977
- 21st Tactical Fighter Wing, 1 January 1980
- 343d Composite Wing (later 343d Tactical Fighter Wing), 1 January 1982
- 343d Operations Group, 1 July 1991
- 354th Operations Group, 20 August 1993 – Present

=== Stations ===
- Moffett Field, California, 1 February 1940
- Hamilton Field, California, 10 September 1940 – 8 February 1941
- Elmendorf Field, Alaska, 21 February 1941
- Big Delta Army Air Field, Alaska, 18 April – 23 November 1942
- Adak Army Air Field Alaska, 6 December 1942
- Amchitka Army Air Field Alaska, 15 February 1943
- Alexai Point Army Air Field, Attu, Alaska, 28 March 1944
- Elmendorf Field, Alaska, 6 November 1945
- Ladd Field, Alaska, 20 June – 15 August 1946
- Minneapolis-Saint Paul International Airport, Minnesota, 1 December 1952
- Ladd Air Force Base, Alaska, 28 August 1954
- Wurtsmith Air Force Base, Michigan, 20 August 1957
- Grand Forks Air Force Base, North Dakota, 1 May 1960 – 15 April 1971
- Elmendorf Air Force Base, Alaska, 1 October 1977
- Eielson Air Force Base, Alaska, 1 January 1982 – present

=== Aircraft ===
- Curtiss P-36 Hawk, 1940–1941
- Curtiss P-40 Warhawk, 1941–1945
- Bell P-39 Airacobra, 1943
- Lockheed P-38 Lightning, 1943–1946
- North American P-51 Mustang, 1946
- North American F-51D Mustang, 1952–1953
- North American F-86A Sabre, 1953–1954
- Northrop F-89D Scorpion, 1954–1957
- Convair F-102 Delta Dagger, 1957–1960
- McDonnell F-101B Voodoo, 1960–1971
- McDonnell F-4 Phantom II, 1977–1981
- Fairchild Republic A-10 Thunderbolt II, 1982–1991
- General Dynamics F-16C Fighting Falcon, since 1991

=== Operations ===
- Combat in Northern Pacific, and defense of Alaska, during World War II
- Air Defense of US, 1952–1971 and 1977–1982
- Close air support for Alaskan/PACAF areas of responsibility, since 1982

=== Decorations ===
- Air Force Outstanding Unit Awards: 1 June 1962 – 31 May 1964; 7 June 1966 – 8 June 1968; 1 January – 31 December 1978; 1 January 1983 – 30 June 1984; 1 July 1985 – 30 June 1987; 1 January 1988 – 31 December 1989; 1 July 1990 – 30 June 1992.
