= 11th Air Division =

- Active: 1950–1951; 1953–1960
- Country: United States
- Branch: United States Air Force
- Role: Command of air defense forces

Insignia
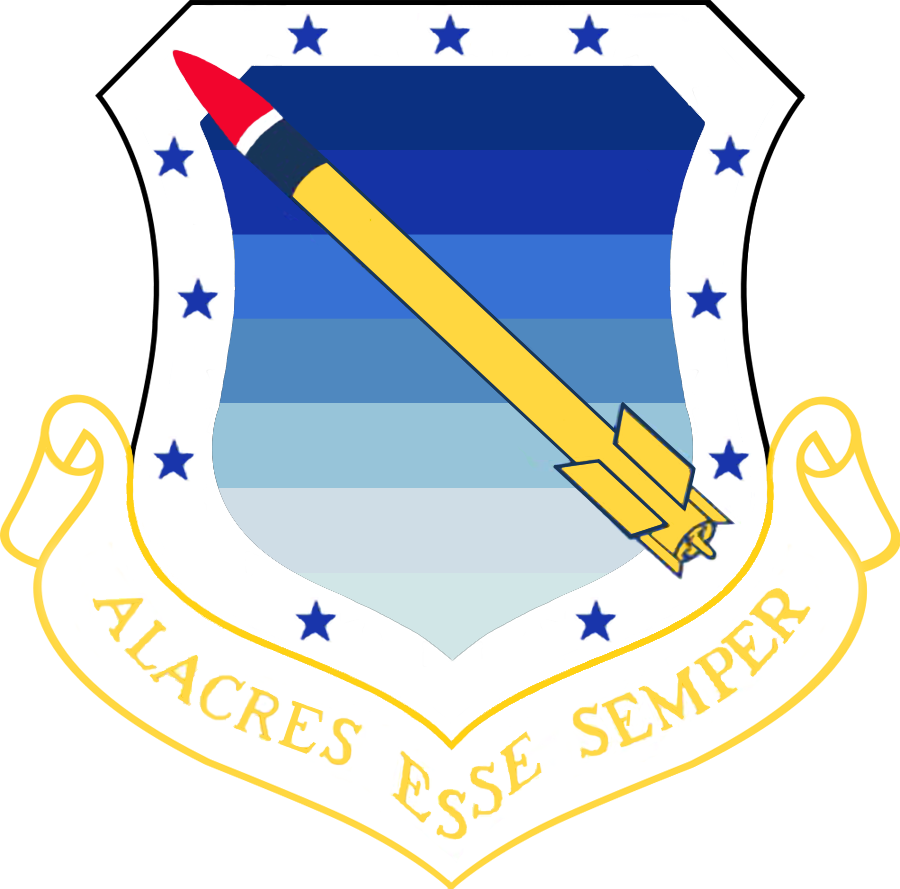
- 11th Air Division emblem (Note: Approved 30 April 1956. Description" A shield variegated azure (shades of blue) within a border argent, charged with eleven stars of blue, over all in bend a rocket or, tipped red, white and blue.)

The 11th Air Division was an air division of the United States Air Force. It provided for the air defense of northern Alaska and supervised base operations at major and minor installations in that area. It furnished detachments at Ice Station Alpha, Drift Station Charlie (November 1957–August 1960), and Drift Station Bravo (T-3) (Fletcher's Ice Island) (July 1959–August 1960), in the Arctic Ocean.

== Lineage ==
- Established as the 11th Air Division (Defense) on 24 October 1950

Organized on 1 November 1950
Discontinued on 27 April 1951 (as a Table of Distribution (T/D) unit)
Activated on 27 April 1951 (as a Table of Organization unit)
Inactivated on 20 July 1951
Activated on 8 April 1953
Discontinued and inactivated on 25 August 1960

The discontinuation and activation in April 1951 represents a change by the division's headquarters from a Table of Distribution unit to a Table of Organization unit. See List of MAJCOM wings of the United States Air Force

=== Assignments ===
- Alaskan Air Command, 1 November 1950 – 27 April 1951
- Alaskan Air Command, 27 April 1951 – 20 July 1951
- Alaskan Air Command, 8 April 1953 – 25 August 1960

=== Components ===
Squadrons

- 18th Fighter-Interceptor Squadron: 1 September 1954 – 20 September 1954; 1 October 1955 – 20 August 1957
- 72d Fighter-Bomber Squadron: attached 1 September 1953 – 15 September 1953
- 416th Fighter-Bomber Squadron: attached 15 September 1953 – 29 September 1953
- 433d Fighter-Interceptor Squadron: 14 July 1954 – 20 September 1954; 1 October 1955 – 1 November 1957 (not operational after 10 September 1957)
- 449th Fighter-All Weather Squadron (later 449th Fighter Interceptor Squadron): attached c. January 1951 – 20 July 1951; assigned 8 April 1953 – 20 September 1954; 1 October 1955 – 25 August 1960
- 455th Fighter-Bomber Squadron: 8 August 1955 – 22 November 1955
- 531st Fighter-Bomber Squadron: attached 5 October 1953 – 13 October 1953
- 720th Fighter-Bomber Squadron: 25 December 1953 – 8 August 1955

=== Stations ===
- Ladd Air Force Base, Alaska, 1 November 1950 – 27 April 1951
- Ladd Air Force Base, Alaska, 27 April 1950 – 20 July 1951
- Ladd Air Force Base, Alaska, 8 April 1953 – 25 August 1960

=== Aircraft / Missiles / Space vehicles ===
- North American F-82 Twin Mustang, 1951
- Lockheed F-94 Starfire, 1951, 1953–1954
- Douglas C-47 Skytrain, 1953-c. 1956
- Douglas C-54 Skymaster, 1953-c. 1956
- Fairchild C-119 Flying Boxcar, 1953-c. 1954
- de Havilland Canada L-20 Beaver, 1953-c. 1956
- Northrop F-89 Scorpion, 1954–1960
- Fairchild C-123 Provider, 1957-1960

=== Commanders ===
- Brigadier General David H. Baker, 1 November 1950 – c.20 July 1951 (additional duty, 1 November 1950–c. January 1951).
- Brigadier General Donald B. Smith, 8 April 1953
- Colonel Oscar A. Heinlein, c. July 1954
- Brigadier General T. Alan Bennett, 28 August 1954
- Colonel Lewis W. Stocking, c.15 May 1957
- Brigadier General Kenneth H. Gibson, c. July 1957
- Brigadier General Conrad F. Necrason, 11 September 1957
- Brigadier General Gordon H. Austin, by September 1958 – 25 August 1960

== See also ==
- List of United States Air Force air divisions
