= Ladd Army Airfield =

Ladd Army Airfield (Ladd Air Force Base)
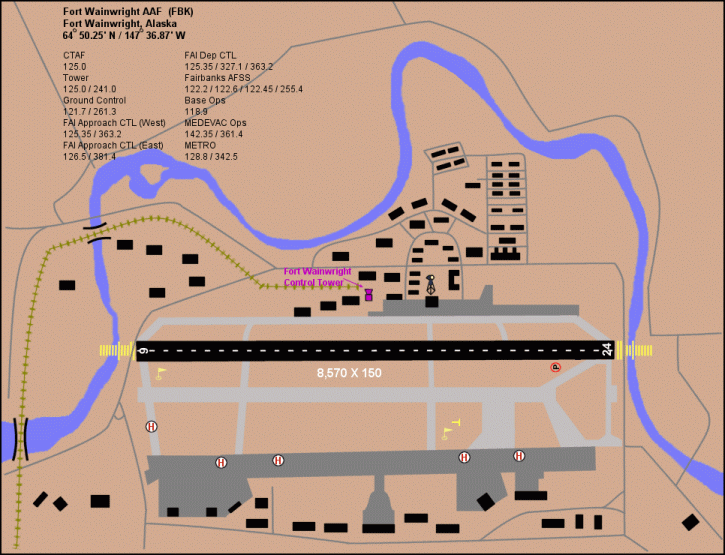
- IATA: FBK; ICAO: PAFB; FAA LID: FBK

Summary
- Airport type: Military: Army airfield
- Operator: United States Army
- Serves: Fort Wainwright
- Location: Fairbanks, Alaska
- Built: 1938
- Elevation AMSL: 454 ft (138 m)
- Coordinates: 64°50′15″N 147°36′52″W
- Website: home.army.mil/wainwright

Map
- Location of airport in Alaska

Runways
Direction	Length		Surface
Direction	ft	m	Surface
7/25	8,575	2,614	Asphalt/concrete
- Source: Federal Aviation Administration

- Ladd Field
- U.S. National Register of Historic Places
- U.S. National Historic Landmark
- Alaska Heritage Resources Survey
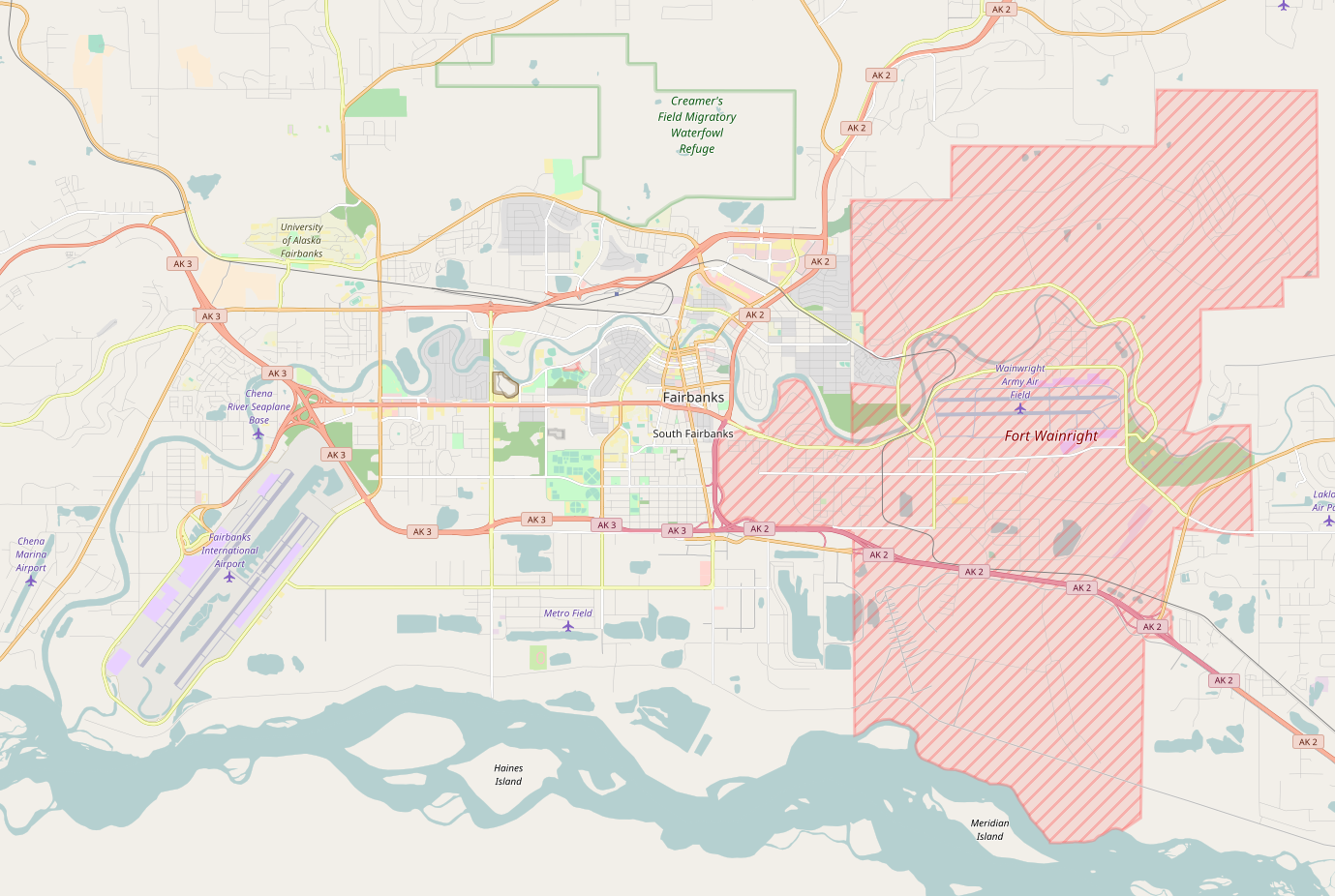
- Location within Fairbanks
- Location: Fort Wainwright
- Nearest city: Fairbanks, Alaska
- Area: 1,010 acres (410 ha)
- Built: 1938
- NRHP reference No.: 85002730
- AHRS No.: FAI-236

Significant dates
- Added to NRHP: 4 February 1985
- Designated NHL: 4 February 1985

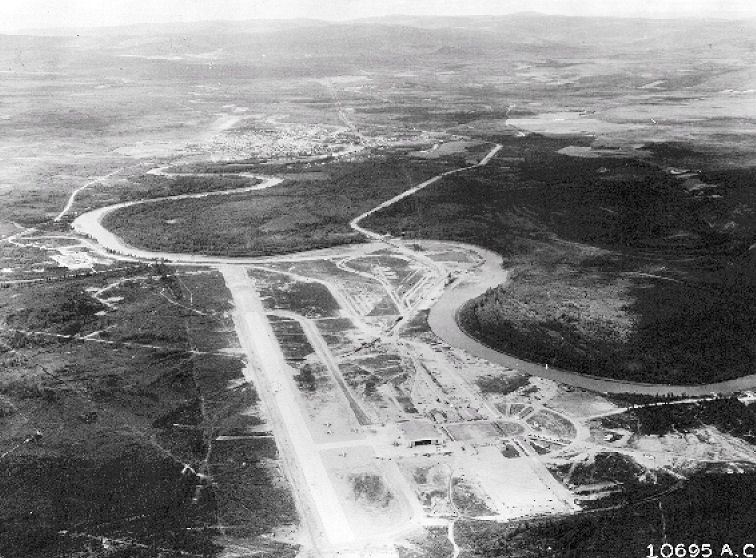
Ladd Army Airfield, about 1943

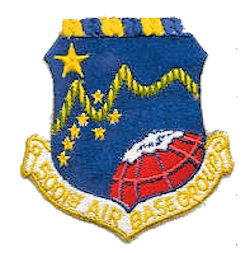
Emblem of the 5001st Air Base Group, Ladd AFB 1947-1959

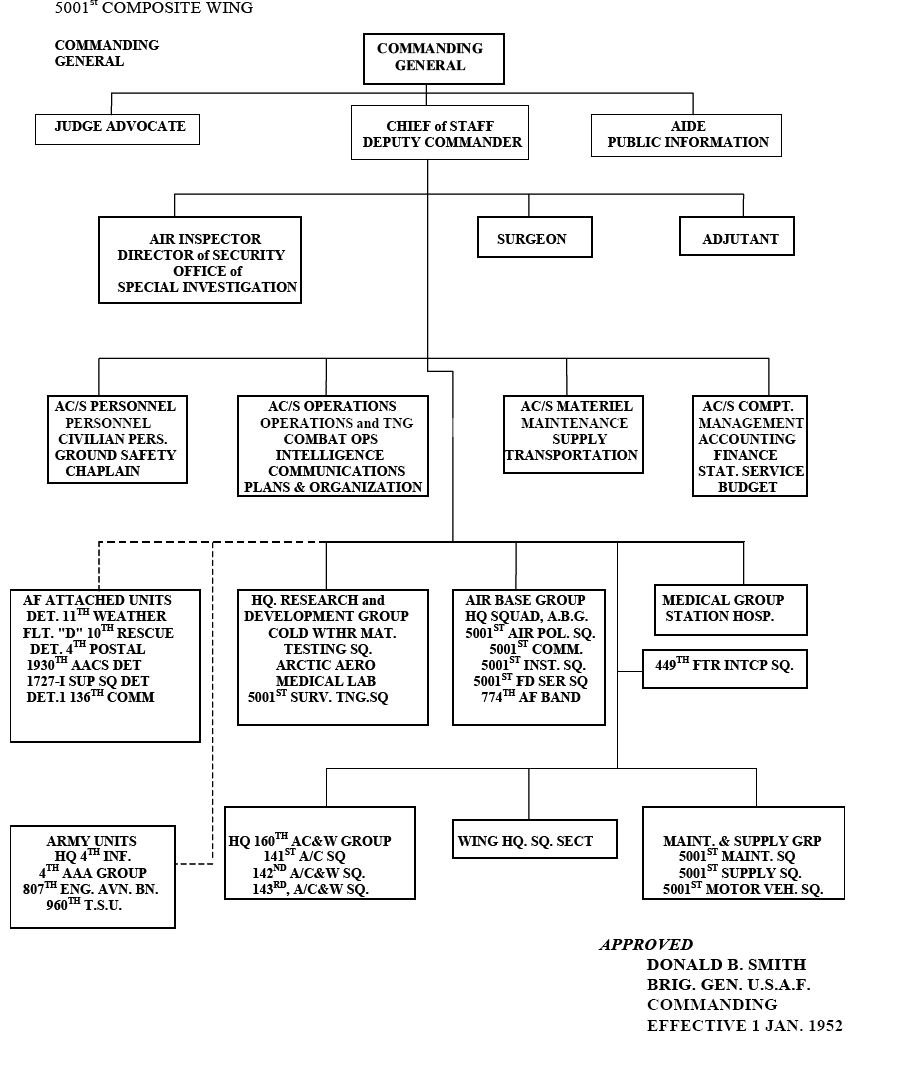
Ladd AFB organizational chart, 1952

Ladd Army Airfield (IATA: FBK, ICAO: PAFB, FAA LID: FBK) is the military airfield located at Fort Wainwright in Fairbanks, Alaska. It was originally called Fairbanks Air Base, but was renamed Ladd Field on 1 December 1939, in honor of Major Arthur K. Ladd, a pilot in the U.S. Army Air Corps who died in a plane crash near Dale, South Carolina on 13 December 1935.

== History ==
=== Origins ===
The U.S. government began its first serious infrastructure expenditures in Alaska during the 1930s. Most prominent was an increase in the military presence. For most of the early 20th century the only Army post in Alaska was Chilkoot Barracks/Fort Seward, located just outside coastal Haines in the state's far southeast. With the threat of war looming as the 1930s ended, the need was established to develop multiple facilities as a means of defending Alaska against possible enemy attack.

The U.S. government acquired homesteads southeast of the town of Fairbanks beginning in 1938. From this 6 square miles (16 km^{2}) Ladd Field was created. The first aircraft to land there was a Douglas O-38F, 33-324, c/n 1177, in October 1940, which is now preserved in the National Museum of the United States Air Force. Major construction of facilities began in 1941 and 1942, after the U.S. entered World War II. The initial construction occurred several miles from Fairbanks along a bend of the Chena River, consisting of an airfield, hangars, housing and support buildings. Many of these buildings still stand today.

Alaska's transportation infrastructure at the time was so limited and the problem of military supply so acute it made sense to concentrate the bases along existing supply lines near Anchorage and Fairbanks. Ladd's location near the Richardson Highway and the Alaska Railroad, its access to fuel from the CANOL pipeline, and its position at the time as one of the United States' northernmost developed airbases, were important factors in securing its early Cold War prominence.

The major use of Ladd Field was primarily cold-weather testing of aircraft and equipment. Only Interior Alaska offered the consistently cold temperatures needed. However, the Attack on Pearl Harbor in December 1941 forced the temporary halt since the military needed all aircraft for the defense of Alaska.

=== World War II ===
Testing at Ladd Field began again in 1942, but by 1943 aircraft cold-weather testing had become a second priority, as Ladd became the hub for fighters and bombers destined for the "Forgotten 1,000 Mile War" in the Aleutians against the Japanese or on their way to Soviet forces as part of the Lend-Lease program.

Reflecting the need to ensure aircraft bound for the Soviet Union were prepared for the flight to Galena and Nome, prior to flying across the Bering Straits to Siberia, Ladd AAF the Alaska Air Depot of XI AF Service Command was activated on 8 July 1942. The depot moved to Elmendorf Field in 1943, although some of its subordinate units remained until 1944.

The airplanes arrived at Ladd were stripped of all but basic instrumentation and armament. Flights took off with no navigational aids from Ladd Field and fly the first leg to Galena, Alaska on the Yukon River. After refueling they went on to Nome, for the short hop across the Bering Strait to Siberia. Many were lost because of bad weather. The weather was also a danger to the ferrying of aircraft into Fairbanks.

Ice fog became a problem for airplanes landing at the field. The airplanes coming in from Great Falls AAB, Montana often could not make it to Ladd. Worse, many didn’t have enough fuel to make it back to Big Delta (to use the alternate Allen Field). It was this danger that led to the military decision to build an auxiliary field south of Ladd Field for a weather-alternate which eventually became "26 Mile Field", and later, Eielson Air Force Base.

By the end of the war, 7,926 aircraft were ferried though Ladd Field. The last aircraft transited the airfield on 1 September 1945.

When the Air Force was made a separate branch in 1947 the name was changed to Ladd Air Force Base (Ladd AFB). For many years, it would be one of two Air Force bases in the Fairbanks area.

Units assigned to Ladd Field included:

Combat Units

- 18th Fighter Squadron, 20 June 1946 – 15 August 1946
- 46th Reconnaissance Squadron, 23 August 1946 - 13 October 1947
- 65th Fighter Squadron, 15 August 1946 - 20 September 1946

Depot Units

- Alaska Air Depot, 21 August 1942 – 12 March 1943

6th Air Depot Group, 2 July 1942 – 29 April 1944

6th Depot Repair Squadron, 6th Depot Supply Squadron, 83d Depot Supply Squadron

Ferrying and Transport Units

- Alaskan Sector, Air Transport Command, 27 August 1942 - ca. 27 October 1942
- 24th Ferrying Group (later 24th Transport Group), 1 March 1943 – 20 September 1943

82d Air Corps Ferrying Squadron (later 82d Transport Squadron), 83d Air Corps Ferrying Squadron (later 83d Transport Squadron)

- Station 3, Alaskan Wing, Air Transport Command, 1 September 1943 – 1 August 1944
- Station 4, Alaskan Wing, Air Transport Command, 1 September 1943 – 1 August 1944
- 1466th AAF Base Unit (Foreign Transport Station), 1 August 1944 - ca. 25 February 1946

Weather and Testing Units (including units at Ladd AFB)

- Air Corps Detachment, Weather, Alaska, 11 January 1941 – 2 May 1941
- Air Corps Cold Weather Testing Detachment (later AAF Cold Weather Testing Detachment, 616th AAF Base Unit), 1 February 1942 - ca. 1 July 1947
- 1st Central Medical Establishment, 1 March 1947 – 10 October 1947'

1st Arctic Aeromedical Laboratory (later Arctic Aeromedical Laboratory), 3 October 1947 - ca. 30 June 1967

- 5001 Research & Development Group, unknown dates
- 5001 Survival Training Squadron (Arctic Survival School), ca 1953 - ca. 1960
- 5064 Cold Weather Materiel Testing Squadron, ca. 1 November 1951 - ca. 8 April 1954

=== Cold War ===
see also: 5001st Composite Wing

From the late 1940s into the 1950s, Ladd AFB served as the northern hub for Air Force activities in Alaska. As headquarters first of the Northern Sector of the Alaskan Air Command and later of the 11th Air Division, Ladd was centrally involved in the Cold War missions of the Alaskan Command and in the transient missions of other military units, including the Strategic Air Command (SAC).

Units assigned to Ladd AFB included:

Divisions

- 11th Air Division, 1 November 1950 – 20 July 1951; 8 April 1953 – 25 August 1960
- Yukon Sector (later Yukon Air Division), 1 September 1946 – 10 June 1948

Wings

- Yukon Composite Wing, 15 June 1948 – 20 September 1948

Maintenance & Supply Group, Ladd AFB

- 5001st Composite Wing (later 5001st Composite Group, 5001st Composite Wing), 20 September 1948 – 8 April 1953 (replaced by 5001st Air Base Wing), 8 April 1953 – 20 September 1954

5001st Air Base Group, 5001st Maintenance & Supply Group, 5001st Station Medical Group

Groups

- 160th Aircraft Control and Warning Group, 7 June 1951 – 1 February 1953
- 531st Aircraft Control & Warning Group, 12 July 1949 – 1 January 1950
- 532d Aircraft Control & Warning Group, 17 November 1950 – 1 August 1951
- 548th Aircraft Control & Warning Group, 1 February 1953 – 8 April 1953
- 5001st Air Defense Group, 20 September 1954 – 1 October 1955
- 5060th Aircraft Control & Warning Group, 1 October 1955 - ca. 1 October 1959

Squadrons

- 18th Fighter-Interceptor Squadron, 28 August 54 - 20 August 57
- 59th Reconnaissance Squadron, 1 June 1947 – 15 October 1947
- 72d Reconnaissance Squadron (later 72d Strategic Reconnaissance Squadron), 13 October 1947 - 28 June 1949
- 74th Air Rescue Squadron, 14 November 1952 – 1 November 1957
- 375th Reconnaissance Squadron, 15 October 1947 – 6 March 1949 (two flights detached)
- 433d Fighter-Interceptor Squadron, 16 July 1954 – 1 November 1957
- 449th Fighter Squadron (later 449th Fighter-Interceptor Squadron), 28 March 1949 - 25 August 1960
- 141st Aircraft Control & Warning Squadron, 7 June 1951 – 1 November 1953
- 142d Aircraft Control & Warning Squadron, ca. 28 May 1951 – 1 November 1953
- 143d Aircraft Control & Warning Squadron, 7 June 1951 – 1 November 1953
- 626th Aircraft Control & Warning Squadron, 29 April 1947 – 26 March 1948
- 632d Aircraft Control & Warning Squadron, 12 July 1949 – 1 August 1951
- 633d Aircraft Control & Warning Squadron, 17 November 1950 – 1 August 1951

Other units

- 787th AAF Base Unit (later 787th AF Base Unit) (157th AACS Squadron), 10 June 1947 – 3 June 1948; replaced by 157th AACS Squadron (later 1930th AACS Squadron), 1 June 1948 – 1 June 1961

Ladd was not exclusively an Air Force site. The Army was also present to provide antiaircraft (AAA) support and base defense. At Ladd, Cold War activities fell mainly into three time periods: an early phase from 1946 to 1950; a buildup and support hub phase from 1950 to 1957; and a transfer phase from 1958 to 1961, when the installation was turned over to the Army.

From 1946 to 1950, personnel from Ladd laid some of the groundwork of the early Cold War with strategic reconnaissance and Arctic research projects. Among other missions, they made initial assessments of the Soviet presence in the Arctic; more fully developed the practice of polar navigation; extended Arctic topography; tested cold weather equipment, clothing, and human performance, as well as maintained the area air defenses of the region.

In 1948, as Cold War tensions heightened, the Army's 2nd Infantry sent ground defense soldiers to Ladd

From the onset of the Korean War in 1950 and continuing through 1957, Ladd saw intense use. It became a busy operations and logistics center with significantly expanded facilities and personnel strength.

As the northern region headquarters of the 11th Air Division, the base was the logistical support center for Alaska's new defense projects. Ladd supported Aircraft Control & Warning (AC&W) sites and forward operating bases such as Galena, Alaska, the northwestern segments of the Distant Early Warning Line (DEW Line), and the White Alice communications network (WACS).

Research projects grew from early Arctic aeromedicine and cold weather testing to include ice station research on the polar pack ice and support for Air Force contracted research in geophysics, communications, and other disciplines. During the 1957/1958 International Geophysical Year (IGY)Ladd provided organizational and logistical support for Operation Ice Skate.

Air defense remained the primary combat mission, while tactical ground support, fighter escort, Arctic training exercises, and base defense were other parts of the base's integrated combat role. The 4th Infantry supplied the Army manpower through 1956.

After 1957, several developments affected Ladd's mission. The technologies of warfare, communications, and reconnaissance had changed. Intercontinental ballistic missiles (ICBMs) and satellites would eventually mean a smaller role for AC&W units, the DEW line, and land-based communications such as White Alice. In 1958, substantial budget reductions forced commanders to reassess their resources. Near Fairbanks, two major air bases, Eielson and Ladd, existed less than thirty miles apart.

=== Transfer to United States Army ===
By 1958, the space age was dawning. ICBMs changed the focus of air defense away from responding to crewed bombers, and satellites were poised to revolutionize communications. That year, the Eisenhower administration drastically curtailed defense funding. One year later, in September 1959, USAF Headquarters informed the Alaskan Air Command that Ladd AFB would be closed and its functions transferred to Eielson AFB and Elmendorf AFB.

For some time, the closure plans remained secret. In May 1960, USAF announced that the 449th Fighter-Interceptor Squadron would be inactivated as part of a "recent reevaluation of the Air Defense Master Plan". By September 1960, Air Force flying operations ceased at Ladd AFB, while announcements confirmed that the Army would take over the installation.

By 1960, operations at Ladd AFB had already diminished from the height of activity in the mid-1950s. The last fighter squadron, the 449th, was inactivated in August 1960. Remaining operations included the Arctic Survival Training School and the MATS Beaverette passenger flights to Elmendorf AFB and McChord AFB. These responsibilities transferred entirely to Eielson AFB. Most other functions transferred to Elmendorf AFB, including a unit of C-123 transport aircraft, Tactical Air Navigation (TACAN) station operations, and all logistic support for auxiliary sites. A few operations continued on-site as tenant commands under Air Force control after the transfer to the Army, most notably the USAF hospital and the Arctic Aeromedical Laboratory.

The actual transfer operation was an administrative undertaking lasting more than six months. Each Air Force function was scrutinized and either transferred or closed out, with supplies and equipment turned in, inventories zeroed out, and personnel reassigned. Ladd AFB, already the headquarters of the Army's Yukon Command, would see the arrival of 2,000 Army personnel previously stationed at Eielson AFB as part of the transfer.

On 1 January 1961, the Army formally took over the installation and renamed it Fort Wainwright with the airfield facility renamed Ladd Field. The airfield was later renamed as Ladd Army Airfield (Ladd AAF).

The elements of the airfield associated with its role in World War II, including two runways, hangars and other operational facilities, and officers' quarters, were listed on the National Register of Historic Places and designated a National Historic Landmark in 1985.

== Popular culture ==
Parts of the 1955 movie Top of the World, starring Dale Robertson, are set at Ladd.

== See also ==
- Alaska World War II Army Airfields
- Air Transport Command
- Northwest Staging Route
- Roy Jones (aviator)
- List of National Historic Landmarks in Alaska
- Leon Crane
- National Register of Historic Places listings in Fairbanks North Star Borough, Alaska
