= 449th Fighter-Interceptor Squadron =

449th Fighter Interceptor Squadron
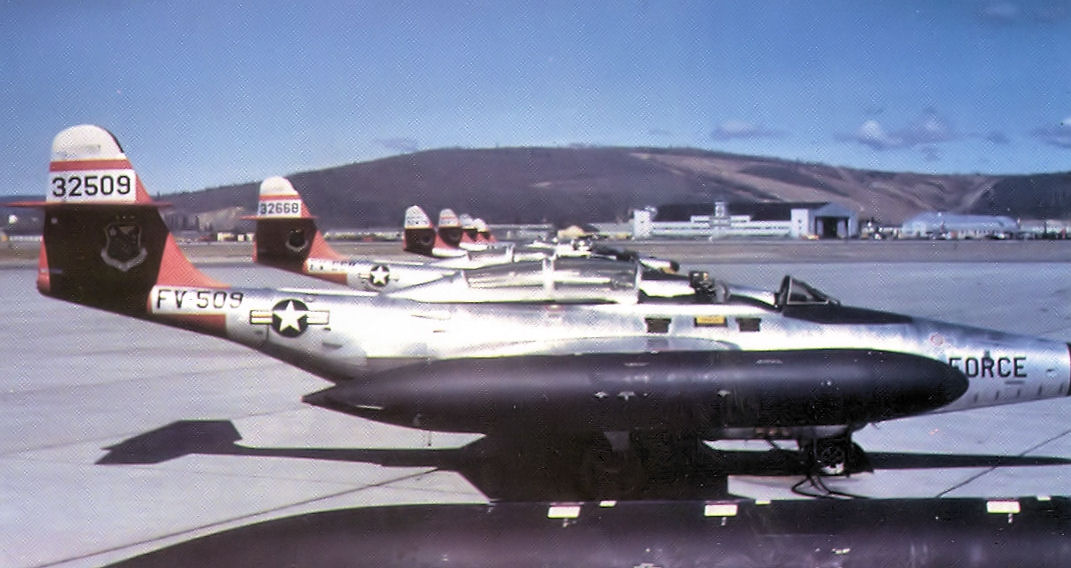
- 449th Fighter Interceptor Squadron Northrop F-89J Scorpions
- Active: 1943–1945; 1947–1960
- Country: United States
- Branch: United States Air Force
- Type: Fighter interceptor
- Engagements: World War II Asia-Pacific Theater

Insignia
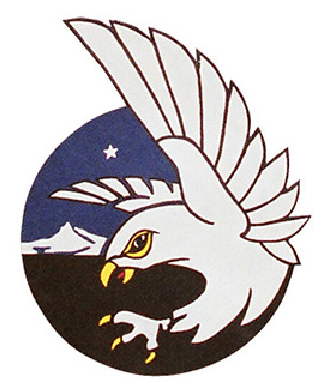
- 449th Fighter-Interceptor Squadron emblem (Approved 4 December 1951)

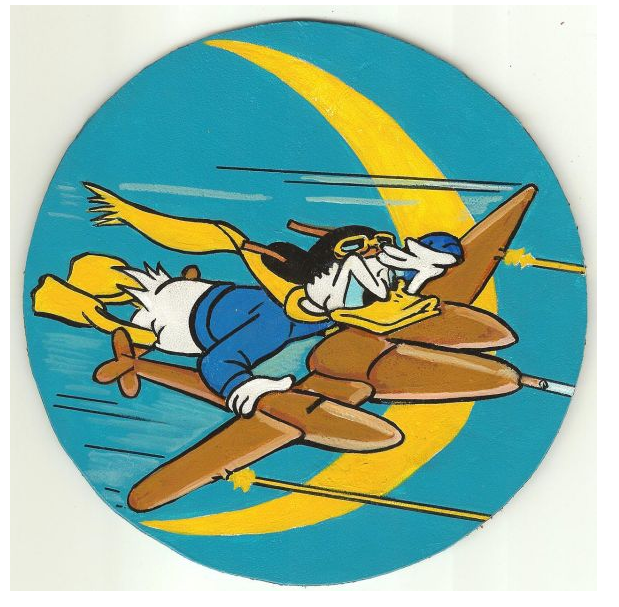
- 449th Fighter Squadron emblem (World War II)

The 449th Fighter Interceptor Squadron is an inactive United States Air Force unit. Its last assignment was with 11th Air Division stationed at Ladd Air Force Base, Alaska, where it was inactivated on 25 August 1960.

The squadron was first activated in 1943 as the 449th Fighter Squadron and engaged in combat in China during World War II. Following VJ Day, it returned to the United States and was inactivated. It was reactivated in Alaska in 1947.

== History ==
=== World War II ===
The squadron was first organized in China as the 449th Fighter Squadron and equipped with Lockheed P-38 Lightnings. It fought in the China Burma India Theater from 1943 to 1945. Former Heisman Trophy-winner Tom Harmon was a member of the unit during their stint in the CBI.

=== Alaskan air defense ===
The 449th was reactivated at Adak Army Air Field as part of Alaskan Air Command in September 1947 and equipped with Northrop P-61 Black Widow night fighters. Its aircraft and personnel were drawn from the 415th Night Fighter Squadron, which was simultaneously inactivated. The Black Widows were used as interceptors against Soviet aircraft intruding into North American airspace.

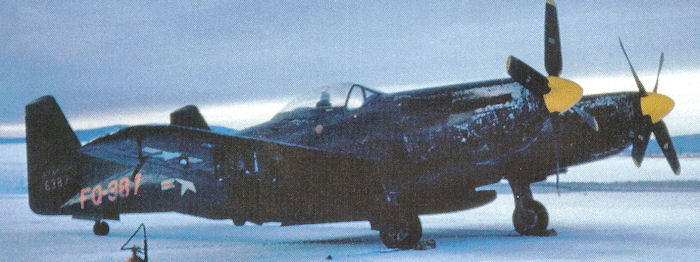
F-82H 46-387 in the Alaskan snow, about 1950

The squadron began to re-equip with North American F-82 Twin Mustangs in 1948, but only became a Twin Mustang unit upon moving to Ladd Air Force Base in 1949. It received additional aircraft from Far East Air Forces after the model was withdrawn from the Korean War. These aircraft were modified to the F-82H model with the addition of cold weather equipment and additional de-icers. Many of these fighters operated with Strategic Air Command where they served as escorts for the massive Convair B-36 Peacemaker bomber during long flights over the Arctic. The 449th Fighter-Interceptor Squadron was the last USAF unit equipped with the F-82, retiring the model in 1953 when a lack of parts made it impossible to keep the aging airframes flying. The retirement of the F-82 marked the end of front-line use of USAF propeller driven fighter aircraft. Many were ultimately scrapped in Alaska.

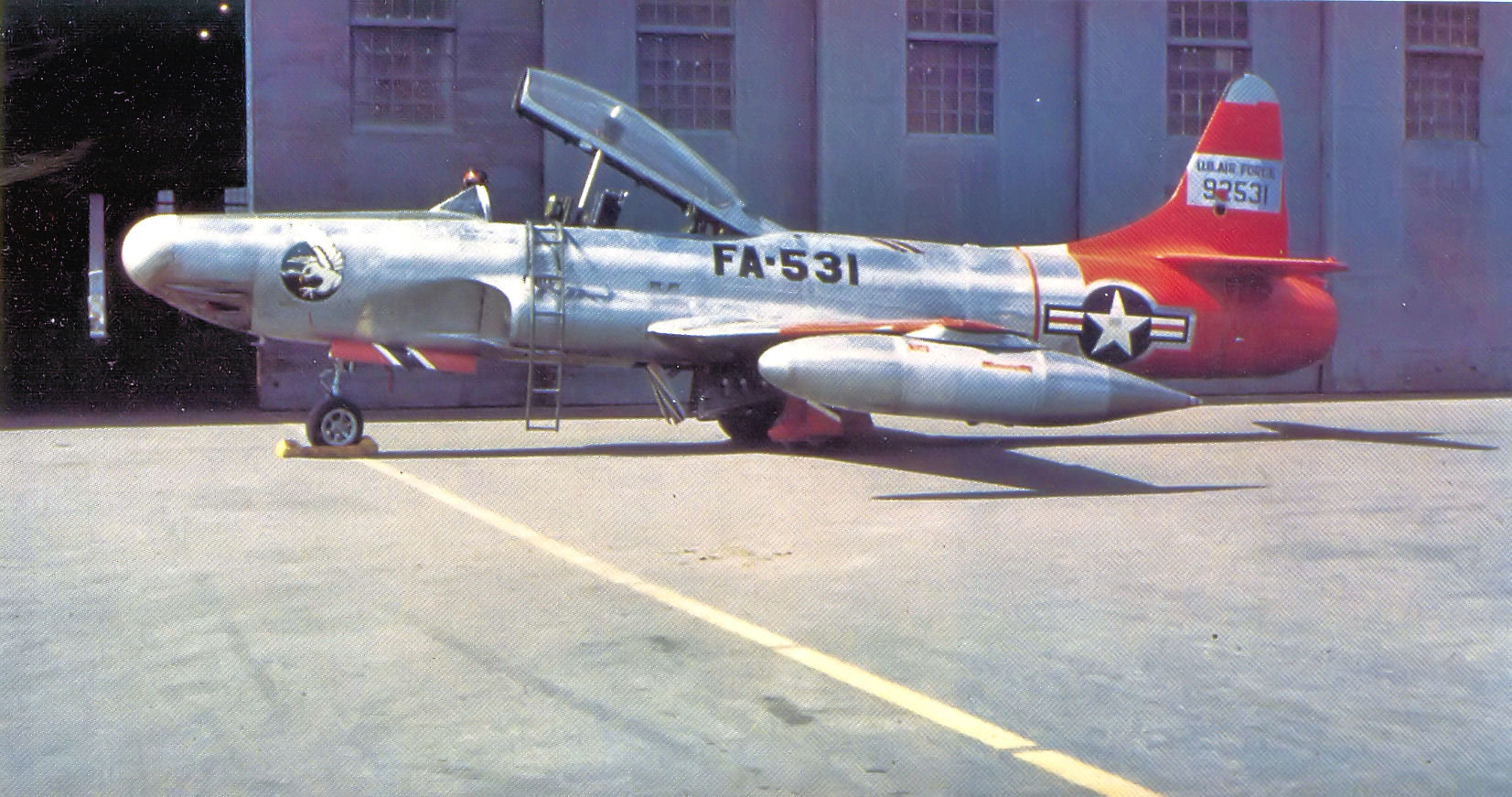
Squadron F-94A

The squadron replaced their Twin Mustangs with jet Lockheed F-94 Starfires armed with 20mm cannon in 1952. The Starfire was not suited to service in the Arctic. When equipped with cold weather gear, the radar operator in the rear seat was cramped and found it difficult to operate. Moreover, the aircraft proved difficult to maintain and had a high accident rate. By mid 1954, the squadron had converted to the Northrop F-89 Scorpion. It initially flew a mix of F-89Cs armed with cannon, and F-89Ds armed with Mighty Mouse rockets in wing pods. In 1957, the squadron converted to the F-89J, which was armed with the nuclear MB-1 Genie air to air missile. After August 1958, the squadron maintained air defense of northern Alaska under the command of North American Air Defense Command. It inactivated in 1960 along with turnover of Ladd to the United States Army as part of Fort Wainwright.

=== Lineage ===
- Constituted as the 449th Fighter Squadron, Two Engine on 2 August 1943

Activated on 26 August 1943
Inactivated on 25 December 1945

- Activated on 1 September 1947

Redesignated: 449th Fighter Squadron, All Weather on 20 July 1948
Redesignated: 449th Fighter-All Weather Squadron on 20 January 1950
Redesignated: 449th Fighter-Interceptor Squadron on 1 June 1951
Discontinued and inactivated on 25 August 1960

=== Assignments ===
- 51st Fighter Group, 26 August 1943 – 13 December 1945 (attached to 23d Fighter Group until October 1943)
- Alaskan Air Command, 1 September 1947 (attached to 5001st Composite Group after 1 May 1949)
- 5001st Composite Wing, 1 July 1949
- 11th Air Division, 8 April 1953
- 5001st Air Defense Group, 20 September 1954
- 11th Air Division, 1 October 1955 – 25 August 1960

=== Stations ===
- Kunming, China, 26 August 1943
- Lingling Airfield, China, 26 August 1943

Detachments operated from Hengyang and Kweilin Airfield, China, September 1943

- Suichwan Airfield, China, February 1944
- Kweilin Airfield, China, June 1944
- Chengkung Airfield, China, 16 July 1944

Detachments operated from: Yunnani Airfield, China, c. 23 July 1944 – March 1945; Mengtsze, China, March 1945 and Posek, China, 12 April – May 1945

- Mengtsze, China, c. 13 July 1945
- India, September – November 1945
- Fort Lewis, Washington, 19 – 25 December 1945,
- Adak Army Air Field (later Davis Air Force Base), Alaska, 1 September 1947
- Ladd Air Force Base, Alaska, 28 March 1949 – 25 August 1960

=== Aircraft ===
- Lockheed P-38 Lightning, 1943–1945
- Northrop P-61 Black Widow, 1947–1949
- North American F-82 Twin Mustang, 1948–1953
- Lockheed F-94B Starfire, 1952–1954
- Northrop F-89C Scorpion, 1954–1957
- Northrop F-89D Scorpion, 1954–1957
- Northrop F-89J Scorpion, 1957–1960

== See also ==
- F-89 Scorpion units of the United States Air Force
- F-94 Starfire units of the United States Air Force
- List of Lockheed P-38 Lightning operators
