= 5001st Composite Wing =

United States Air Force unit (1948–1957)

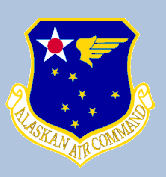
5001st Composite Wing

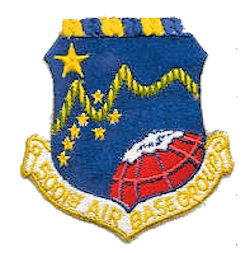
- Emblem of the 5001st Air Base Group
- Active: 1948–1961
- Country: United States
- Branch: United States Air Force
- Role: Air Defense/Cold Weather Testing
- Part of: Alaskan Air Command

The 5001st Composite Wing is a defunct United States Air Force organization. Throughout its existence, it was assigned to the Alaskan Air Command and stationed at Ladd Air Force Base, Alaska.

It was established as the Yukon Composite Wing on 15 June 1948, and then redesignated as the 5001st Composite Wing on 20 September 1948. It was inactivated on 1 October 1957 when the four digit unit designations on Ladd got changed to 5060th.

== Components ==
- 5001st Composite Group
- 5001st Air Defense Group
- 5001st Supply Squadron
- 18th Fighter-Interceptor Squadron, 20 September 1954 – 1 October 1955
- 433d Fighter-Interceptor Squadron, 20 September 1954 – 1 October 1955
- 449th Fighter Interceptor Squadron, 1 May-8 April 1953; 20 September 1954 – 1 October 1955
- 5th Liaison Squadron, 13 April 1953 – 10 May 1945 (Attached)(11th AD)
- 720th Fighter-Bomber Squadron, 25 December 1953 – 17 May 1954 (11th AD)
- 46th Reconnaissance Squadron, 1 June 1946

Redesigned: 72d Reconnaissance Squadron, 25 October 1947 – 28 June 1949

== Operations ==
Activated at Ladd AFB in 1948 as the host unit for a diverse mission. The wing routinely hosted attached aircraft and personnel from CONUS bases in large-scale winter exercises, while at the same time guarding against the Cold War threat of Soviet aggression. Attached units carried out a wide variety of missions, including

- Strategic Aerial Reconnaissance
- Air Defense
- Search and Rescue
- Arctic Research

The 5001st also hosted Army personnel deployed to the Fairbanks area. The wing was inactivated in 1961 when Ladd AFB turned over to the United States Army.

=== Strategic Aerial Reconnaissance ===
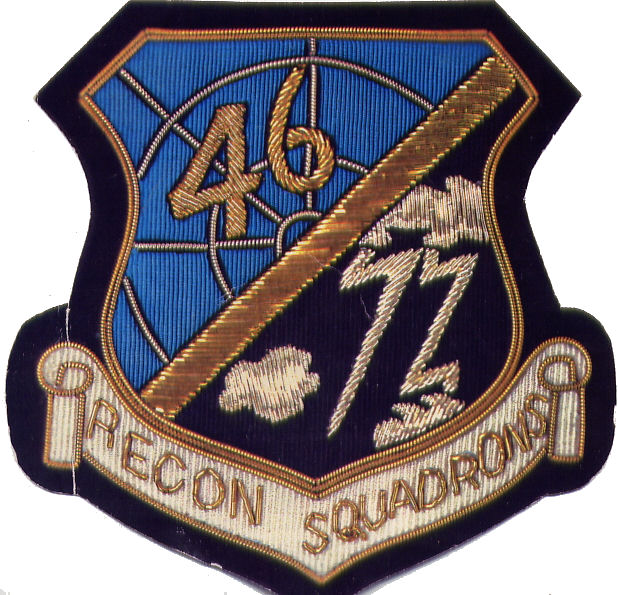
Emblem of the 46th/72d Reconnaissance Squadron

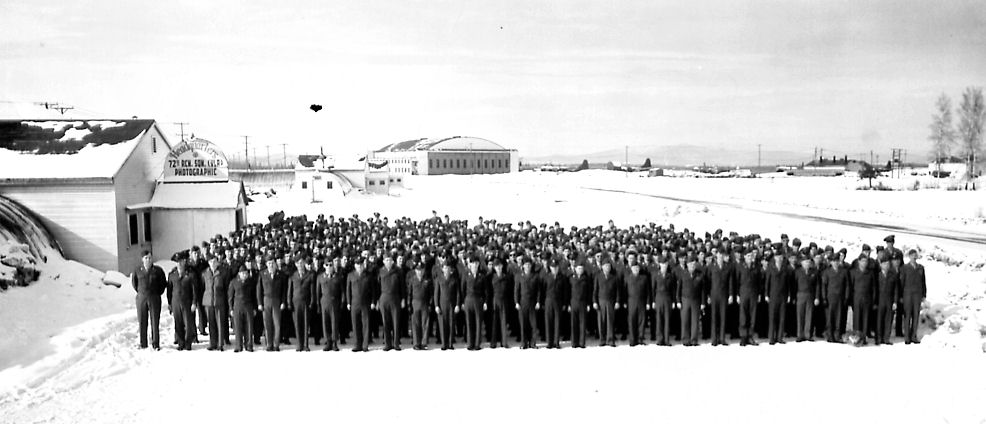
Squadron photo of the 72d Reconnaissance Squadron, 1948

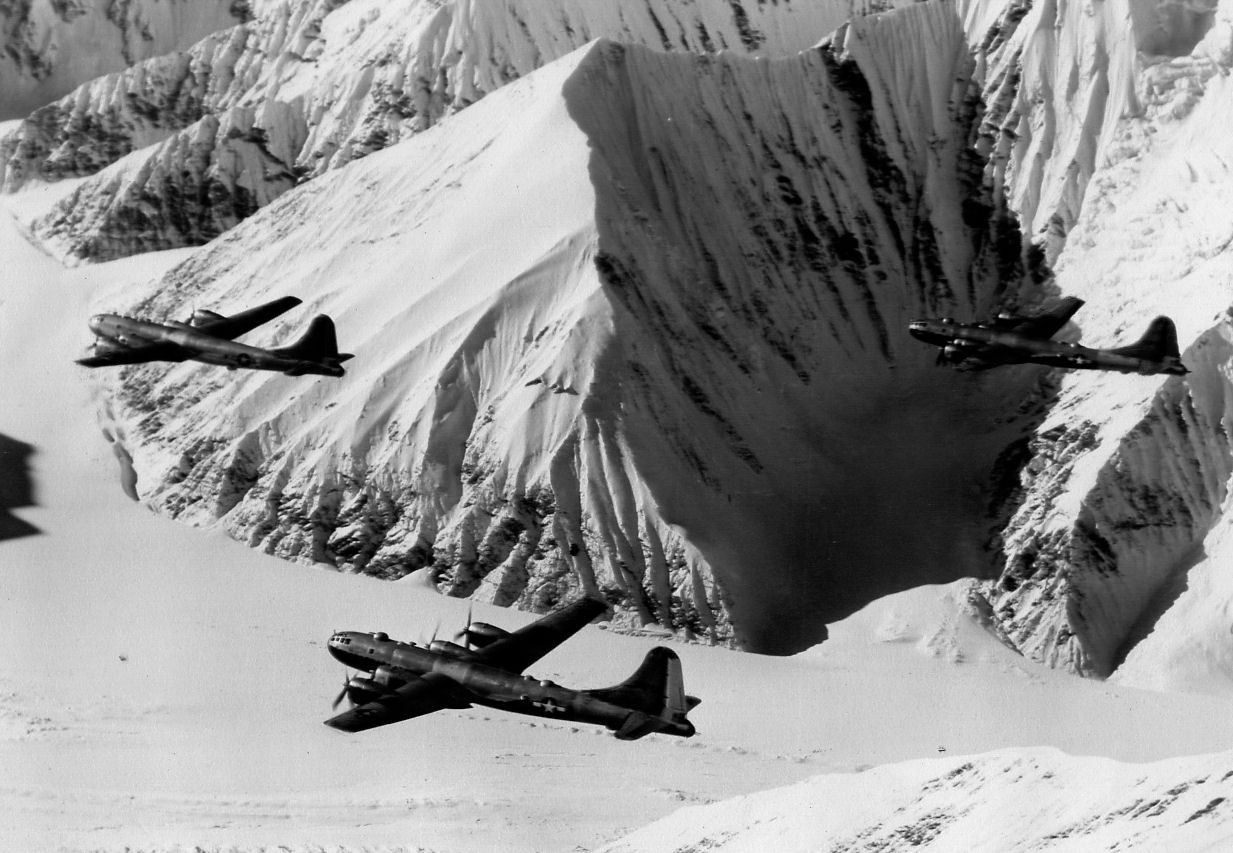
RB-29s of the 72d RS near Mount McKinley, 1948

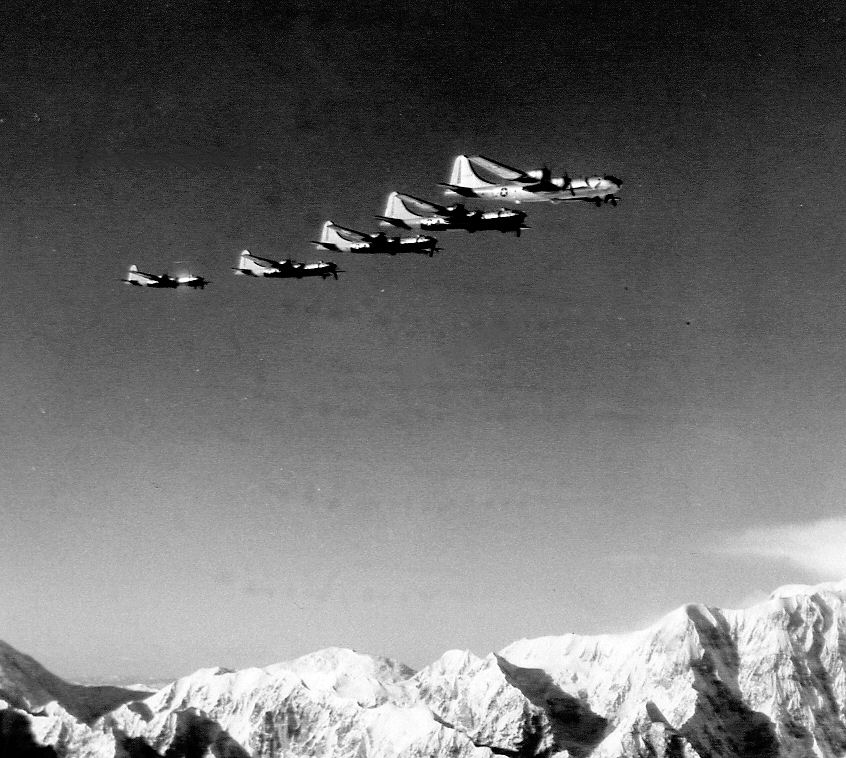
Flight of RB-29s over Alaska, 1949

In the early years of the Cold War, some of the most important strategic reconnaissance was carried out by Strategic Air Command units deployed to Ladd AFB. One of the SAC's initial missions was to plan strategic aerial reconnaissance on a global scale. The first efforts were in photo reconnaissance and mapping. Along with the photo-recon mission, a small electronic intelligence, or ELINT, cadre was operating. Weather reconnaissance was part of the effort, as was Long Range Detection, the search for Soviet atomic explosions.

In the late 1940s, strategic intelligence on Soviet capabilities and intentions was scarce. Before the development of the U-2 high-altitude spy plane and reconnaissance satellites, technology and politics limited American reconnaissance efforts to the borders, and not the heartland, of the Soviet Union. Ladd AFB was one of the important staging areas for gathering what strategic intelligence could be obtained along Soviet borders.

However the early reconnaissance crews did more than gather intelligence about Soviet coastal operations. With the advent of the polar concept, military planners realized that they had very little operational knowledge of the Arctic region north of Alaska. Alaskan recon crews had a variety of missions that helped lay the groundwork for polar navigation, flying and maintaining aircraft under Arctic conditions, and understanding weather systems. Their missions contributed to military and civilian knowledge in topography, Arctic search and rescue, and other areas.

Ladd was the base for one of the first strategic reconnaissance squadrons of the Cold War was the 46th Reconnaissance Squadron (later redesignated the 72d Reconnaissance Squadron (also known as the 46th/72d). The squadron's mission was to develop accurate polar navigation, survey and map the Arctic, perform comprehensive weather studies, test its men and equipment in Arctic conditions, and later train other units, particularly SAC bombers, in polar navigation and operations and fly long range photographic intelligence flights with RB-29 Superfortresses.

During the squadron's tenure at Ladd its men accomplished some of the most challenging tasks of Arctic flying and laid the groundwork for other units which carried on its mission through the 1950s. The 46th/72d was a tenant unit, reporting directly to SAC headquarters.

SAC selected Ladd as the home for this unit because of Ladd's northern location. In 1946, prior to the formation of the Yukon Composite Wing, the base was in caretaker status. Demobilization was still the order of the day throughout the services. Ongoing cold weather testing was Ladd's main operation, together with oversight of the scattered outposts of the Yukon Sector. The 46th/72d's reconnaissance missions were intertwined with basic operational concerns, particularly since this was the first such unit to undertake long-range, long-term duties in the western Arctic. In order to perform reconnaissance, for example, the crews had to perfect the grid navigation system for polar flying, a complex method which until that time had not been systematically tested.

As a photo reconnaissance unit, the 46th/72d collected intelligence until 1949, when other units took over the work. Its missions included searching for unclaimed Arctic land masses, evaluating the Soviet presence in the Arctic, and photomapping Alaska, the Canadian archipelago, Greenland, and portions of Soviet territory. Using specially modified RB-29s, crews flew long-range missions of 12 to 30 hours' duration, virtually all of it under strict radio silence. The ten-man crews included a captain and a combination of relief pilots, navigators, radar operators, radio operators, and photographers. One aircraft, #871, had a high-tech oblique camera with 100 inch focal length which could photograph installations up to 100 miles away.

Some of the most important missions involved reconnaissance of the Soviets' Chukotski Peninsula in 1948 and 1949, which allayed fears of Soviet buildup in that region directed against the United States. The 46th/72d also photographed the Kamchatka Peninsula, Anadyr, Diomede, Wrangel Island, northern Siberia, and Novaya Zemlya, the Soviet Union's nuclear testing area.

Aerial reconnaissance also contributed to mapping projects in Alaska and the Arctic carried out by a number of agencies including the Army Corps of Engineers, the Bureau of Land Management, the U.S. Geological Survey, and the Coast & Geodetic Survey. In 1946–48, the 46th/72d recon squadron, with the assistance of Canadian crews, completed the "Polaris" project which systematically photomapped the Canadian archipelago. Later, builders of the DEW Line referred back to this information during site selection.' In October 1949, the National Geographic Society released its new map of the Arctic, crediting the aerial photography teams of the U.S. Air Force, and the Ladd squadron in particular, with providing the updated information.

In addition to the aerial reconnaissance, Electronic Reconnaissance (ELINT) missions were flown from Eielson, during the summer of 1947. By 1949, the missions had discovered and assessed eleven Soviet radar sites, and had revealed where significant gaps in Soviet Arctic defenses lay. This gave planners the information they needed to develop routes for strategic bombers, and laid the groundwork for the initial war plans covering the Soviet Far East. Electronic reconnaissance continued through the 1950s although little information is available. At neighboring Eielson AFB, ELINT missions took place throughout the 1950s and continued to the 1980s

Weather reconnaissance took place throughout Ladd's Cold War years, from the first arrival of the 59th Weather Reconnaissance Squadron in 1946 through the flights of the 55th Weather Reconnaissance Squadron in 1960. Gathering weather information for combat readiness was an integrated part of strategic aerial reconnaissance. Weather recon, though, was a particularly loose term. There was a constant need for weather information, but weather flights were also a convenient cover for the more covert missions.

As neighboring Eielson AFB developed into a SAC base, much of the reconnaissance mission shifted to its facilities. Eielson became the primary site for strategic reconnaissance around 1949, when the 375th Reconnaissance Squadron was transferred from Ladd.

=== Air Defense ===
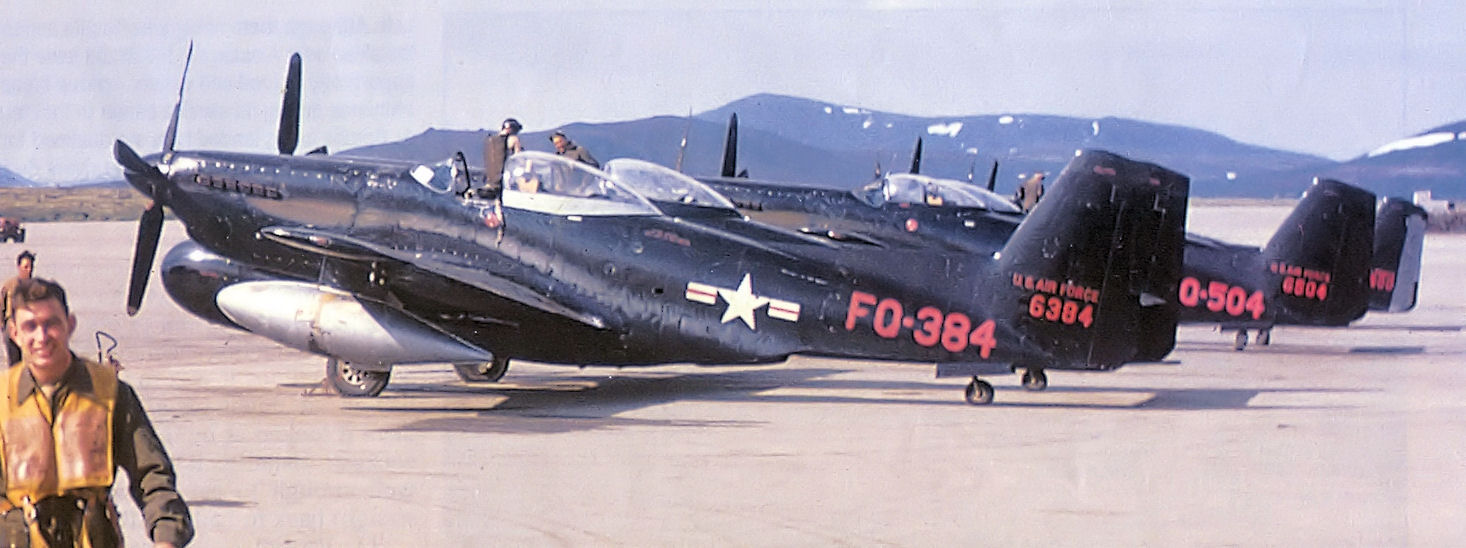
449th FIS F-82Hs 46-384 and 46-504 on the ramp at Ladd AFB, July 1950

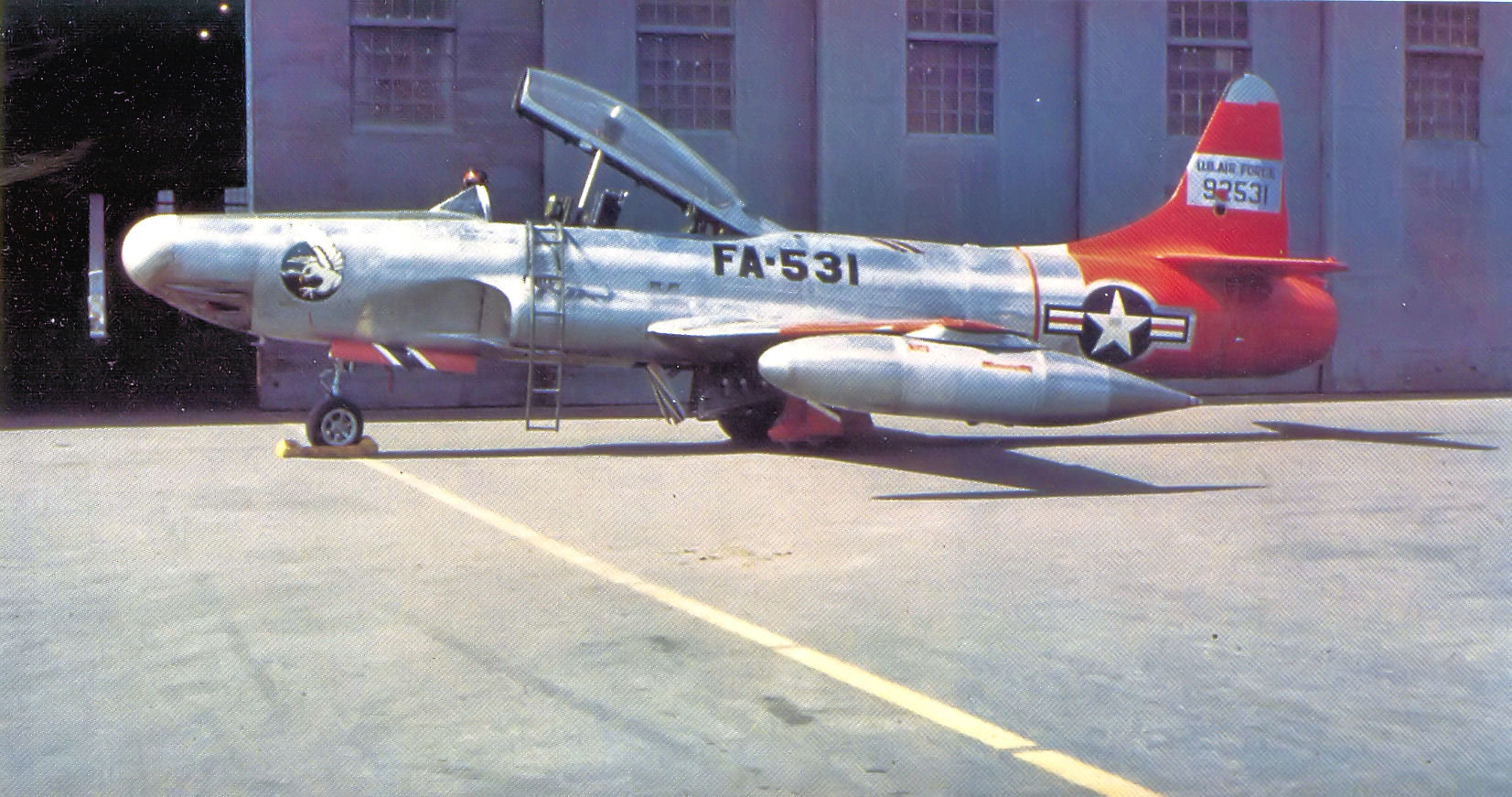
449th Fighter-Interceptor Squadron Lockheed F-94A-5-LO 49-2531, Ladd AFB, 1955

The wing's central mission was air defense. Ladd AFB was the northern hub for Alaskan air defense operations and logistics. It was the sector command headquarters for air defense engagement, coordinating ground control and intercept functions and supporting the outlying northern elements of the air defense system.

Initially, Ladd's role was to emphasize defense against manned aircraft attack. However, after 1957, ballistic missiles changed the direction of air defense, and Ladd's role would change accordingly. The regional air defense mission involved locating, identifying, and destroying hostile manned aircraft. It consisted of several coordinated functions. Radar sites swept the skies for indications of air intrusions; communications links provided information to the ground controllers and intercept pilots; fighter-intercept aircraft were kept on alert for dispatch to identify and intercept intruders. Ground controllers prepared to track and direct potential air battles, while ground-based artillery units stood by to attack any enemy aircraft that passed through the intercept net and approached the air base itself.

AC&W squadrons from Ladd manned the new outlying radar sites as they came on line in the early 1950s. They were supported by fighter intercept squadrons based at Ladd. In 1951, three AC&W squadrons were active; by the late 1950s, there were as many as ten AC&W squadrons assisted by three squadrons of fighter-interceptors at Ladd and Galena, the major forward base Fighter-intercept pilots and ground crews served on alert duty, ready to scramble their aircraft to intercept any unknown airplanes entering Alaskan airspace in the northern zone.

An Air Defense Control Center (ADCC) coordinated air defense operations and training exercises for the AC&W, Fighter-Interceptor, and AAA units. After 1958, the entire air defense operation ran out of the Alaskan NORAD Region Command and Control Center at Elmendorf.

As part of the national-level division of roles and missions, Army units were responsible for certain ground-based air defenses. At Ladd, Army AAA units cooperated with the ADCC to provide antiaircraft defense with Skysweeper artillery. After 1959, five outlying Nike sites protected the Ladd/Eielson complex. The Nike Hercules weapons were computer-guided surface-to-air missiles designed to explode amid enemy bomber formations.

=== Search and Rescue ===
During World War II, Alaska's military search and rescue teams had developed equipment, operating systems and knowledge to serve the men in action. At the end of the war, the resources all but disappeared. By April 1946, the Alaskan Air Command realized that it would need to re-establish this capability, and it consolidated its efforts into one reorganized unit, the 10th Air Rescue Squadron.

With headquarters and a coordination center located at Elmendorf AFB, this unit took responsibility for search, aid and rescue. The 10th maintained the 74th detachment at Ladd, which was upgraded to a squadron in 1952. By the time USAF inactivated the 10th Rescue in 1958, it had saved military and civilian lives throughout the Territory and had become well known as the glamour unit of the 1950s Air Force in Alaska.

=== Arctic Research ===
Cold weather testing was Ladd Field's original mission. The first Cold Weather Detachment arrived in September 1940 and set to work testing aircraft, clothing and equipment. By the end of the war, they had evaluated nearly every type of aircraft in the frigid conditions of interior Alaska. Initially, Ladd Field had been the only U.S. facility which could perform these tests under continuous conditions of extreme cold.

By 1950, Ladd's Cold Weather Test Group had been assigned to the new Air Force Research and Development Command. The 5001st Research and Development Group at Ladd came into existence a year later "to monitor all arctic tests of equipment and material...which are conducted in Alaska..., [and] to furnish test facilities and administrative services...."9~ Under this umbrella, the 5064th Cold Weather Materiel Testing Squadron continued the cold weather testing mission together with the Arctic Aeromedical Lab In 1951 the 5064th performed tests on engines, arctic flying clothing, and armament as well as on aircraft maintenance procedures. The 5064th operated aircraft maintenance and shop facilities.

From 1946 to 1961, USAF engaged in observations of polar ice pack phenomena which resulted in the support of three major manned ice stations. The Russians had begun drift station research a decade earlier. In 1937, they undertook scientific experiments from a drifting ice station near the North Pole, and they had followed that up after the war with an accelerated program of ice pack investigations.

USAF began its inquiries in 1946 with the reconnaissance sorties of Project Nanook, as the 460th photo recon unit from Ladd searched the Arctic for undiscovered lands

During the 1950s, AAC and Ladd AFB were involved in supporting a series of ice stations. The first, T-3, was located on a drifting ice island and hosted scientific parties during several lengthy occupations. Joint military-civilian teams first occupied T-3 from 1952 – 1954 during Project Icicle. Under Project Ice Skate, the station was used again during the International Geophysical Year (IGY) of 1957–58 and beyond. Over the years, T-3 drifted across the Arctic basin, leaving the zone of AAC support periodically. During the IGY, when T-3 had drifted to Greenland, two other stations were established in the western Arctic as pack ice stations.

Ice Station Alpha was occupied from 1957 – late 1958. When it began to break up, crews established a new station the following spring. Known as Ice Station Charlie, it lasted ten months before meeting the same fate. In 1961, USAF ended its sponsor¬ship of ice station research, turning its remaining facilities on T-3 over to the Navy. In an approach typical of the Cold War, ice station research included both basic and applied science in a framework of partnership between military and contracted researchers. By sponsoring and supporting the stations, USAF contributed to basic geophysical research as it tested military applications for its own purposes. Contributions to basic geophysics included studies in oceanography, arctic meteorology and the upper atmosphere, ice movement, solar radiation, gravity and magnetism, and ice island features and origins. The Air Force also gained experience in developing the islands as forward military stations with weather stations, emergency landing facilities and listening posts.
