= 433rd Weapons Squadron =

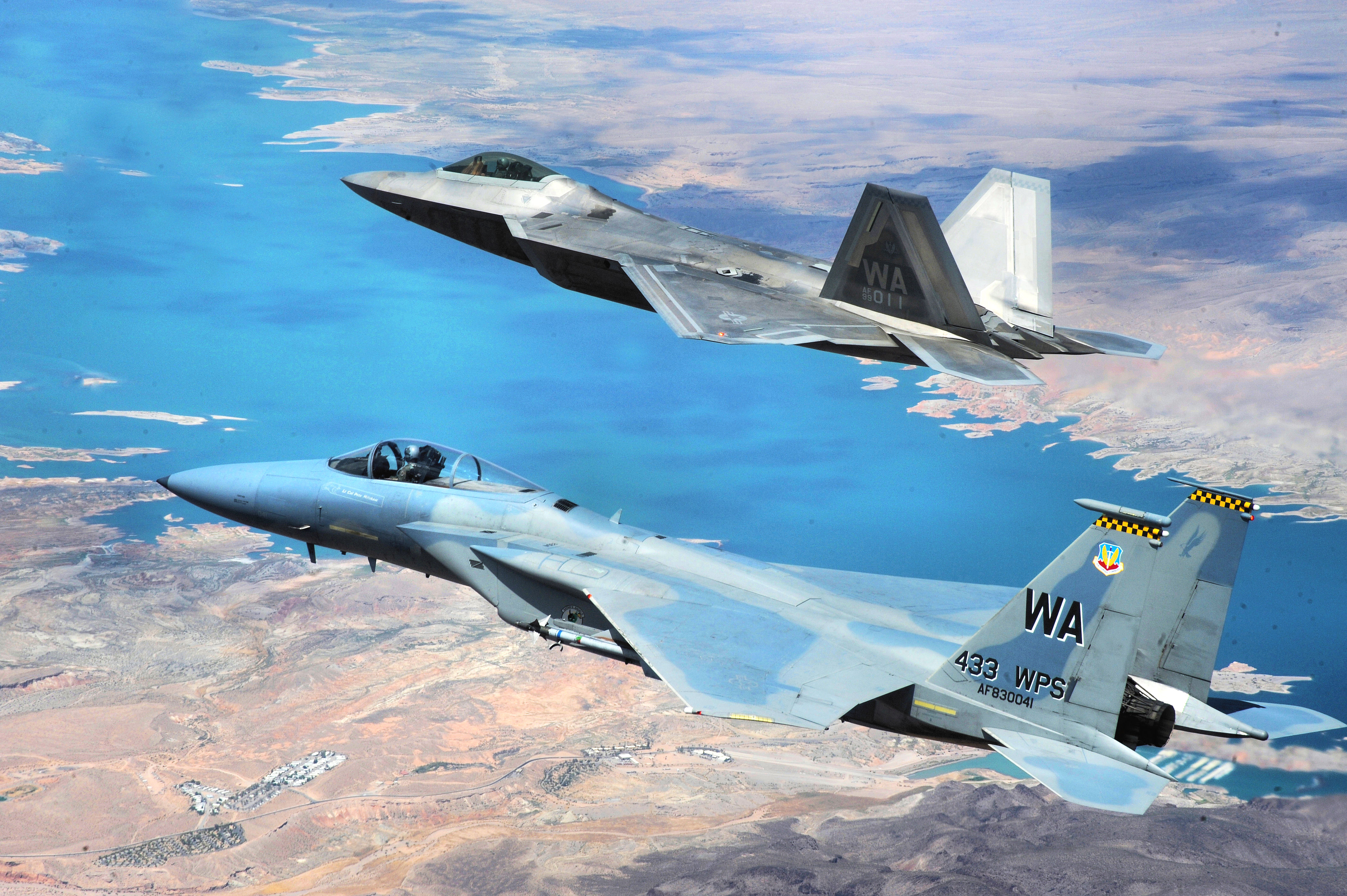
- F-22A Raptor and F-15C Eagle from 433rd Weapons Squadron in formation over Lake Mead
- Active: 1943–1949; 1952–1958; 1964–1974; 1976–1981; 1983–1992; 2003–present
- Country: United States
- Branch: United States Air Force
- Type: Squadron
- Role: Advanced Air Superiority Fighter Training
- Part of: USAF Weapons School
- Garrison/HQ: Nellis AFB, Nevada
- Nickname(s): Satan's Angels, Blue Devils (World War II)
- Engagements: World War II (Asia-Pacific Theater) Vietnam War

- Decorations: Distinguished Unit Citation (3x) Air Force Outstanding Unit Award with Combat "V" Device (6x) Air Force Outstanding Unit Award (3x) Philippine Presidential Unit Citation (World War II) Republic of Vietnam Gallantry Cross with Palm

Insignia
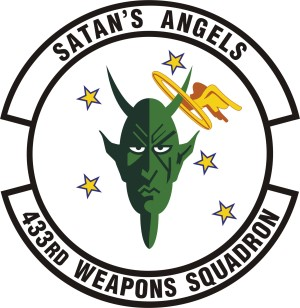
- 433rd Weapons Squadron emblem (Approved 14 May 1954, restored 30 August 2007) (Note: Although this emblem was not approved until 1954, there is some indication that a variation of it was used by the squadron toward the end of World War II. Watkins, p. 40.)

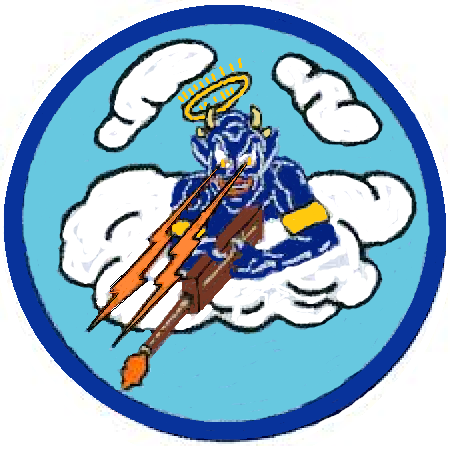
- 433rd Fighter Squadron emblem
- Tail Code: WA

The 433rd Weapons Squadron is a United States Air Force unit, assigned to the USAF Weapons School at Nellis AFB, Nevada.

The unit was first activated during World War II in May 1943 and flew the P-38 Lightning in the Pacific Theater of Operations. The 433rd distinguished themselves in air combat against Japan over New Guinea, Rabaul, and the Philippines, achieving over 200 aerial victories. Reactivated in 1964 for the war in Southeast Asia, the 433rd was assigned to the 8th Fighter Wing at Ubon, Thailand, flying the F-4 Phantom II. The 433rd was credited with 12 MiG kills over North Vietnam.

== History ==
=== World War II ===
Established by Fifth Air Force in Australia in May 1943 specifically to accommodate very long range Lockheed P-38J Lightnings at Amberley Airfield in Queensland, Australia. The 433rd was specifically trained to provide long-range escort for bombers during daylight raids on Japanese airfields and strongholds in the Netherlands East Indies and the Bismarck Archipelago.

Engaged in combat operations, providing escort for B-25 Mitchell medium bombers that were engaged in strafing attacks on airdromes at Wewak but also destroyed a number of the enemy fighter planes that attacked the formation. Also intercepted and destroyed many Japanese aircraft which were sent against American shipping in Oro Bay on 15 and 17 October 1943. Covered landings in New Guinea, New Britain, and the Schouten Islands. After moving to Biak in July 1944, the squadron flew escort missions and fighter sweeps to the southern Philippines, Celebes, Halmahera, and Borneo.

Moved to the Philippines in October 1944 and attacked enemy airfields and installations, escorting bombers, and engaging in aerial combat during the first stages of the Allied campaign to recover the Philippines, October–December 1944. The squadron flew many missions to support ground forces on Luzon during the first part of 1945. Also flew escort missions to Southeast China and attacked railways on Formosa. Began moving to Ie Shima near Okinawa in August 1945 but the war ended before the movement was completed.

After active combat ended, on 22 September 1945, the squadron moved to Seoul Airfield, Korea for occupation duty as part of the 308th Bomb Wing, assigned to the 315th Air Division of Far East Air Forces. The unit moved to Kimpo Airfield, on 7 January 1946 where it converted to the very long-range P-51H Mustang. The squadron was reassigned to Nagoya Airfield, Japan in March 1947 and later moved to Itazuke Airfield, Japan in August 1948. It became a subordinate unit of 475th Fighter Wing on 10 August.

The squadron was inactivated on 1 April 1949 at Itazuke Airfield, Japan

=== Cold War ===
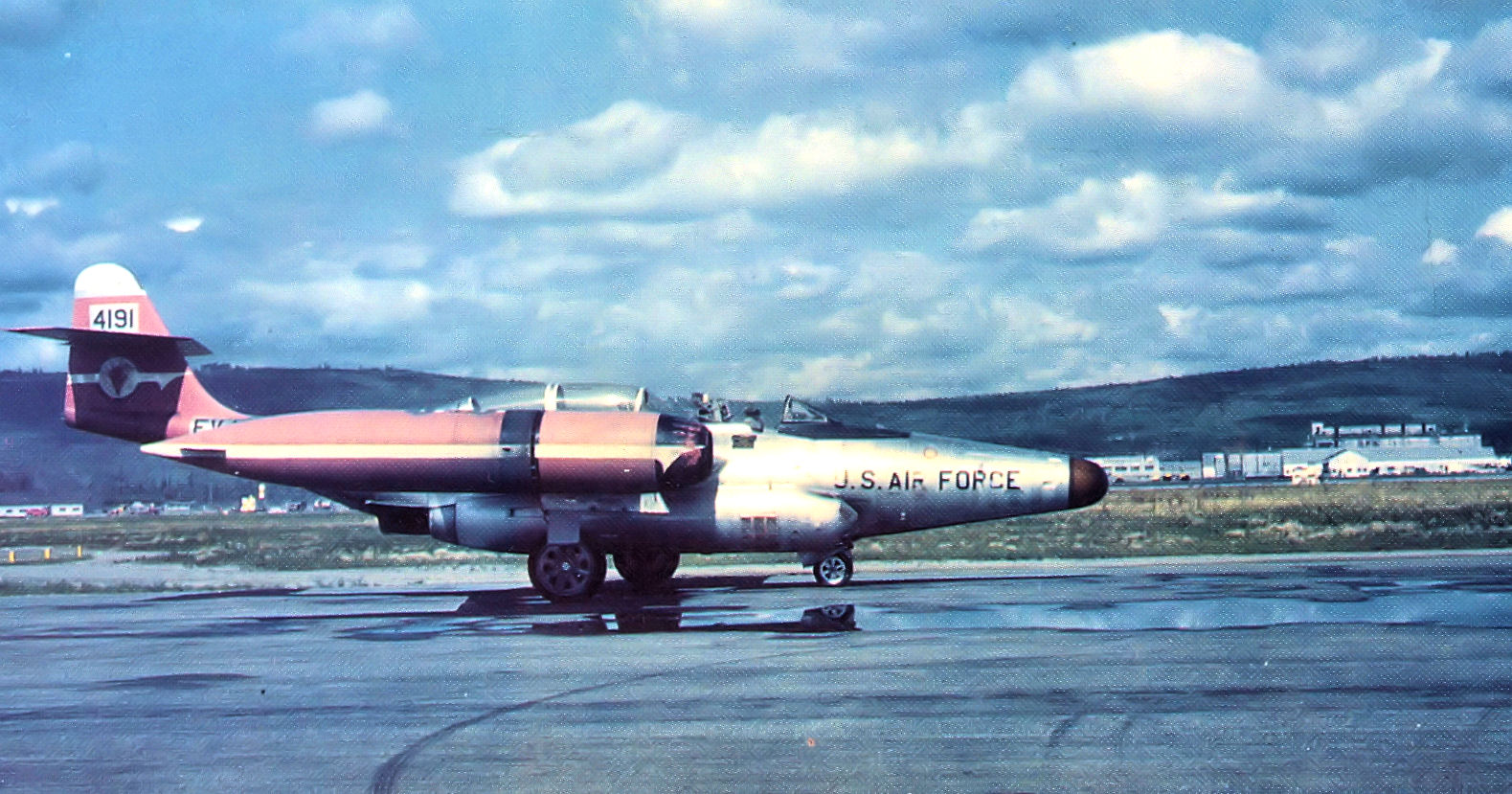
433rd FIS F-89D-75-NO Scorpion 54-191 about 1956 at Ladd AFB, Alaska

Reactivated by Air Defense Command in 1952 as a Fighter-Interceptor Squadron, stationed at Truax Field, Wisconsin and equipped with F-89 Scorpions. Deployed to Eleventh Air Force at Ladd AFB, Alaska, 1954 performing air defense of central and Northern Alaska, responding to GCI directed intercepts of intruding Soviet aircraft. Returned to the Continental United States, being assigned to Minot AFB, North Dakota in 1957. However, no aircraft were assigned to the unit, and in January 1958 the 433rd FIS was inactivated due to budget restraints.

Was reassigned to Tactical Air Command, being stationed at George AFB, California, assigned to 8th Tactical Fighter Wing. Equipped with F-4C Phantom II tactical fighter-bomber, engaged in training, participated in numerous exercises, operational readiness inspections, deployments.

=== Vietnam War ===
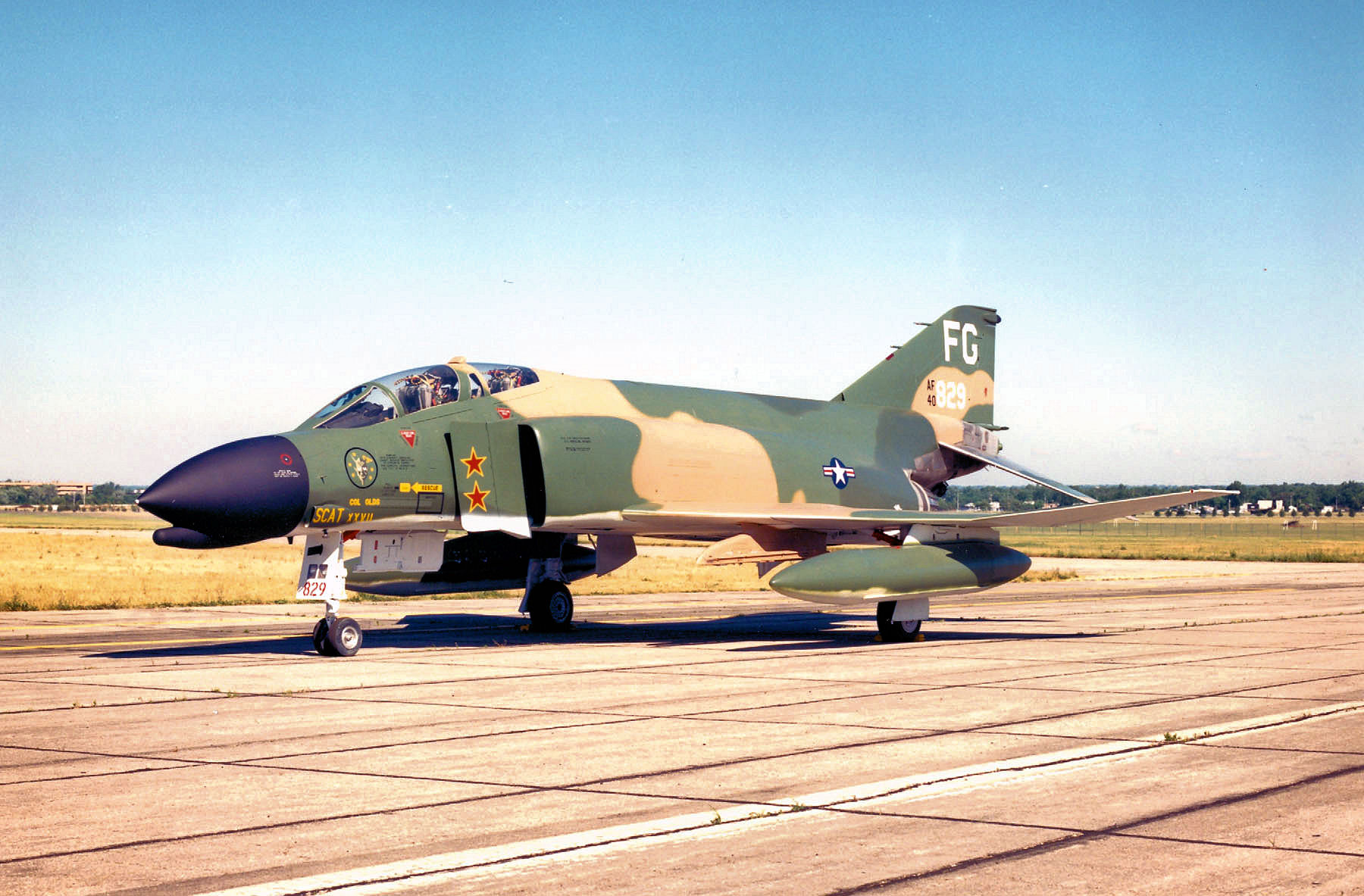
McDonnell F-4C-24-MC Phantom 64-0829, Known as "Scat XXVII", assigned to the 433rd Tactical Fighter Squadron, Ubon RTAFB, Thailand. This aircraft was flown by Colonel Robin Olds while he was the commander of the 8th Tactical Fighter Fighter Wing at Ubon. Col. Olds was credited with shooting down four enemy MiG aircraft (two with this aircraft) in aerial combat over North Vietnam. Aircraft is now on permanent display at the Museum of the United States Air Force.

Was deployed to Ubon Royal Thai Air Force Base in December 1965, becoming part of Pacific Air Forces Thirteenth Air Force. Assigned to the 8th Tactical Fighter Wing, engaged in combat operations over Southeast Asia, the squadron's mission included bombardment, ground support, air defense, interdiction, and armed reconnaissance.

Beginning in May 1967, it was re-equipped with new F-4D aircraft. This gave the unit the distinction of being the first in Southeast Asia to be operationally equipped with improved Phantom II. In May 1968, the squadron began combat-testing the first laser-guided bombs (LGBs), the BOLT-117 and the Paveway.

During its final years of combat, used F-4Ds for fast-forward air control, interdiction, escort, armed reconnaissance, and other special missions. Continued combat in Vietnam until mid-January 1973, in Laos until 22 February 1973, and in Cambodia until 15 August 1973. Remained in Thailand until July 1974 when the squadron was inactivated.

=== Fighter Weapons Squadron ===
Reactivated as part of the 57th Fighter Weapons Wing at Nellis AFB, Nevada on 1 October 1976. Mission of the squadron was test and evaluate systems modifications to the McDonnell Douglas F-15A Eagle prior to those changes being released to operational units of Tactical Air Command and USAFE. Mission assumed by USAF Fighter Weapons School F-15 Division at the end of 1981, inactivated on 30 December.

=== Flying Training ===
Reactivated in 1983 at Holloman AFB, New Mexico as a T-38 Talon training squadron to provide Lead-In Fighter Training (LIFT) training for pilots assigned to fly the F-15 Eagle. Performed training on the T-38 until the LIFT program was sharply cut back in 1991, as part of the end of the Cold War. Inactivated 8 July 1992.

=== USAF Weapons School ===
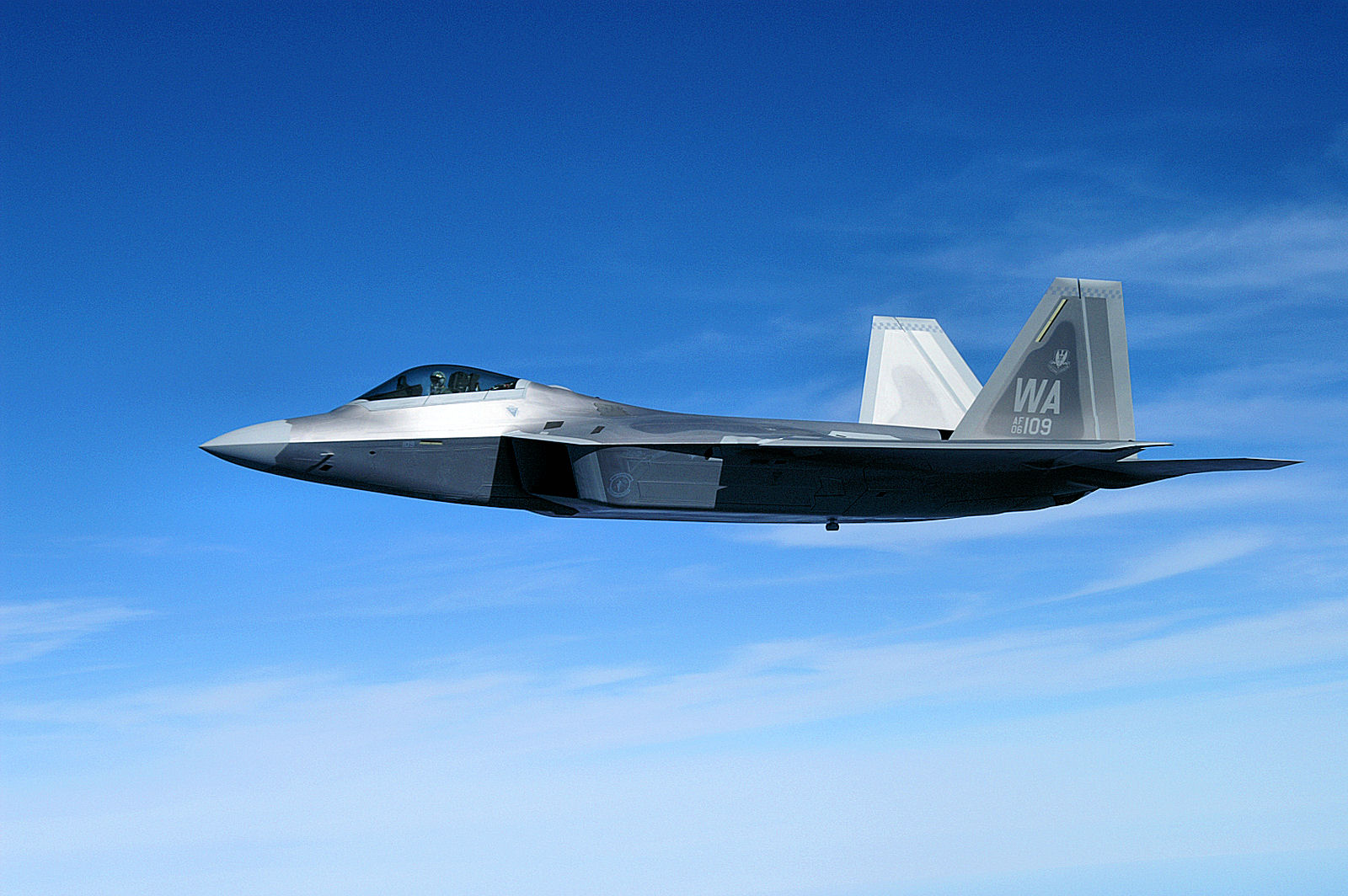
433rd WPS F-22A Block 30 Raptor 06-0109

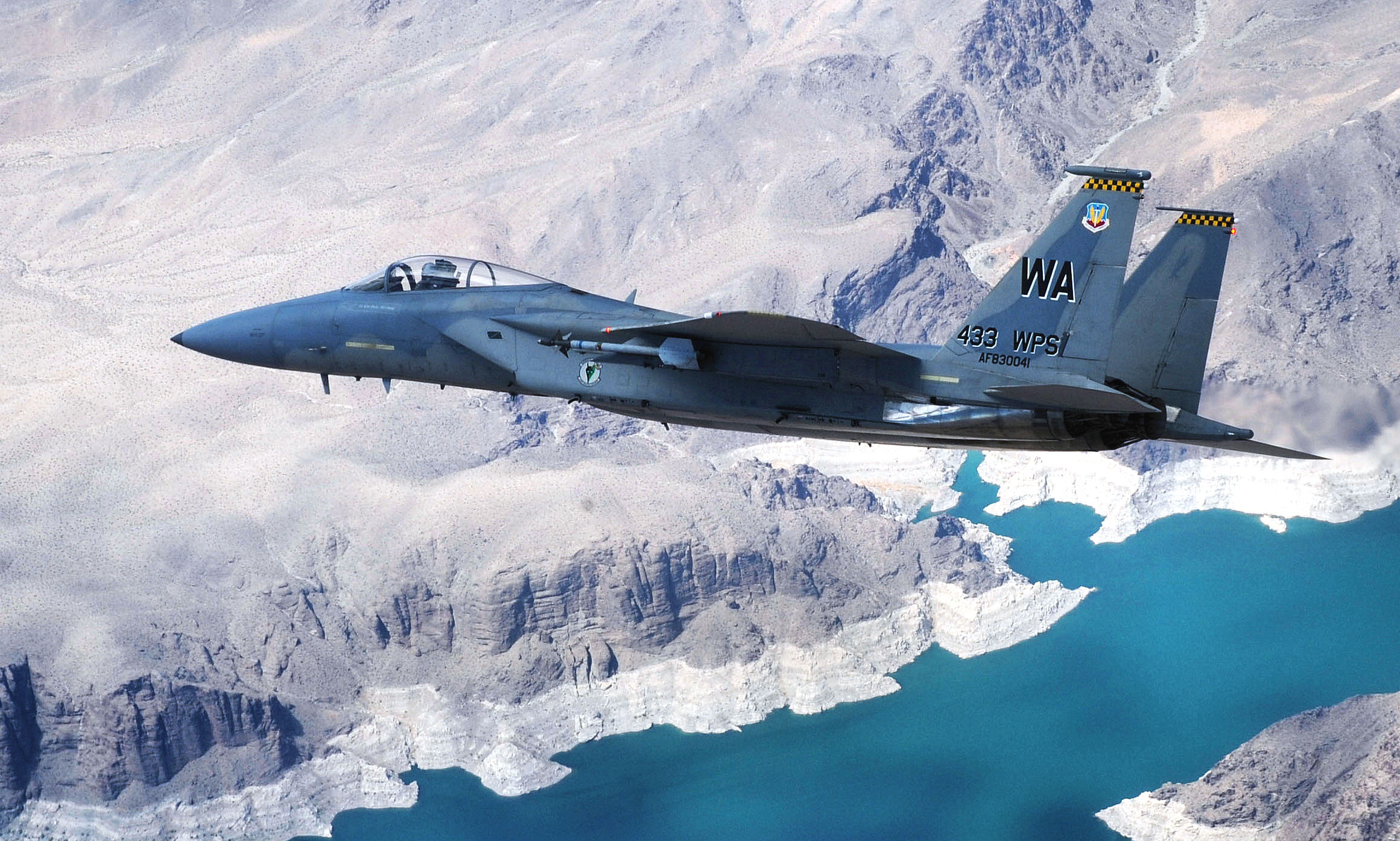
433rd WPS McDonnell Douglas F-15C-36-MC Eagle 83-0041

Reactivated at Nellis AFB in 2003, replacing the USAF Fighter Weapons School F-15C Division. Mission was conduct Weapons Instructors Course at the USAF Weapons School and provide the world's most advanced training in weapons and tactics employment. Upon completing the course, graduates return to their home stations, taking the latest tactics, techniques and procedures for air-to-air and air-to-ground combat to their respective units. During the course, students receive an average of 400 hours of graduate-level academics and participate in demanding combat training missions. The climax of the course is the mission employment phase, a two-week staged battle over the Nevada Test and Training Range.

Began teaching F-15 course in Feb 2003. Began instruction with F-22 Raptor, providing a Weapons Instructor Course in 2009. The F-15C Eagles were officially retired shortly following WSINT 21B in December 2021.

== Lineage ==
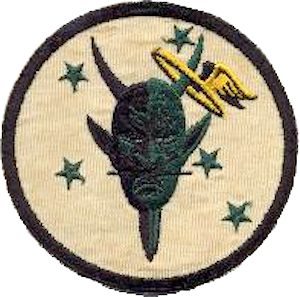
433 FIS (Air Defense Command) emblem

- Activated on 14 May 1943 by special authority prior to constitution as 433d Fighter Squadron (Two Engine) on 15 May 1943

Redesignated 433d Fighter Squadron, Two Engine on 14 Feb 1944
Redesignated 433d Fighter Squadron, Single Engine on 8 Jan 1946
Inactivated on 1 Apr 1949

- Redesignated 433d Fighter-Interceptor Squadron on 11 Sep 1952

Activated on 1 Nov 1952
Inactivated on 8 Jan 1958

- Redesignated 433d Tactical Fighter Squadron, and activated, on 16 Jul 1964.

Organized on 25 Jul 1964
Inactivated on 23 Jul 1974

- Redesignated 433d Fighter Weapons Squadron on 10 May 1976

Activated on 1 Oct 1976
Inactivated on 30 Dec 1981, assets re=designated as the USAF Fighter Weapons School F-15C Division.

- Redesignated 433d Tactical Fighter Training Squadron on 25 May 1983

Activated on 1 Sep 1983
Redesignated 433d Fighter Squadron on 1 Nov 1991
Inactivated on 8 Jul 1992

- Redesignated 433d Weapons Squadron on 24 Jan 2003

Activated and organized on 3 February 2003, assuming resources of F-15C Division, USAF Weapons School

=== Assignments ===
- 475th Fighter Group, 14 May 1943 – 1 Apr 1949

Attached to 347th Fighter Group, 18 Nov 1947 – 28 Aug 1948

- 31st Air Division, 1 Nov 1952
- 520th Air Defense Group, 16 Feb 1953
- 11th Air Division, 14 Jul 1954
- 5001st Air Defense Group, 20 Sep 1954
- 11th Air Division, 1 Oct 1955
- 32d Fighter Group, 1 Nov 1957 – 8 Jan 1958
- Tactical Air Command, 16 Jul 1964
- 8th Tactical Fighter Wing, 25 Jul 1964 – 23 Jul 1974
- 57th Fighter Weapons (later, 57th Tactical Training; 57th Fighter Weapons) Wing, 1 Oct 1976 – 30 Dec 1981
- 479th Tactical Training Wing, 1 Sep 1983
- 479th Fighter Group, 26 Jul 1991
- 49th Operations Group, 15 Nov 1991 – 8 Jul 1992
- USAF Weapons School, 3 Feb 2003 – present

=== Stations ===
- Charters Towers, Australia, 14 May 1943
- RAAF Base Amberley, Australia, c. 1 July 1943
- Dobodura Airfield Complex, New Guinea, 14 August 1943

Operated from Port Moresby Airfield Complex, New Guinea, 8 August-3 October 1943

- Nadzab Airfield Complex, New Guinea, 26 March 1944
- Hollandia Airfield Complex, New Guinea, 15 May 1944
- Mokmer Airfield, Biak, Netherlands East Indies, 15 July 1944
- Dulag Airfield, Leyte, 9 November 1944

Detachment operated from McGuire Field, San Jose, Mindoro, 5 February—c. 4 March 1945

- Clark Field, Luzon, 28 February 1945
- Lingayen Airfield, Luzon, 19 April 1945
- Ie Shima Airfield, Okinawa, 8 August 1945
- Kimpo AB, Korea, 5 October 1945
- Titami, Japan, 21 September 1946
- Itazuke AB, Japan, 18 November 1947 – 1 April 1949
- Truax Field, Wisconsin, 1 November 1952
- Ladd AFB, Alaska, 16 July 1954
- Minot AFB, North Dakota, 1 November 1957 – 8 January 1958.
- George AFB, CA, 25 Jul 1964-Dec 1965
- Ubon RTAFB, Thailand, 8 Dec 1965 – 23 Jul 1974
- Nellis AFB, NV, 1 Oct 1976 – 30 Dec 1981
- Holloman AFB, NM, 1 Sep 1983 – 8 Jul 1992
- Nellis AFB, NV, 3 Feb 2003 – present

=== Aircraft ===
- P-38 Lightning, 1943–1946
- P-51 Mustang, 1946–1949
- F-94C Starfire, 1953
- F-89C Scorpion, 1952–1957
- F-4C Phantom II, 1964–1967
- F-4D Phantom II, 1967–1974
- F-15A/B Eagle, 1976–1981
- T-38 Talon, 1983–1992
- F-15C Eagle, 2003 – 2021
- F-22 Raptor, 2004 – present
