= Alaskan Air Command =

Inactive United States Air Force unit

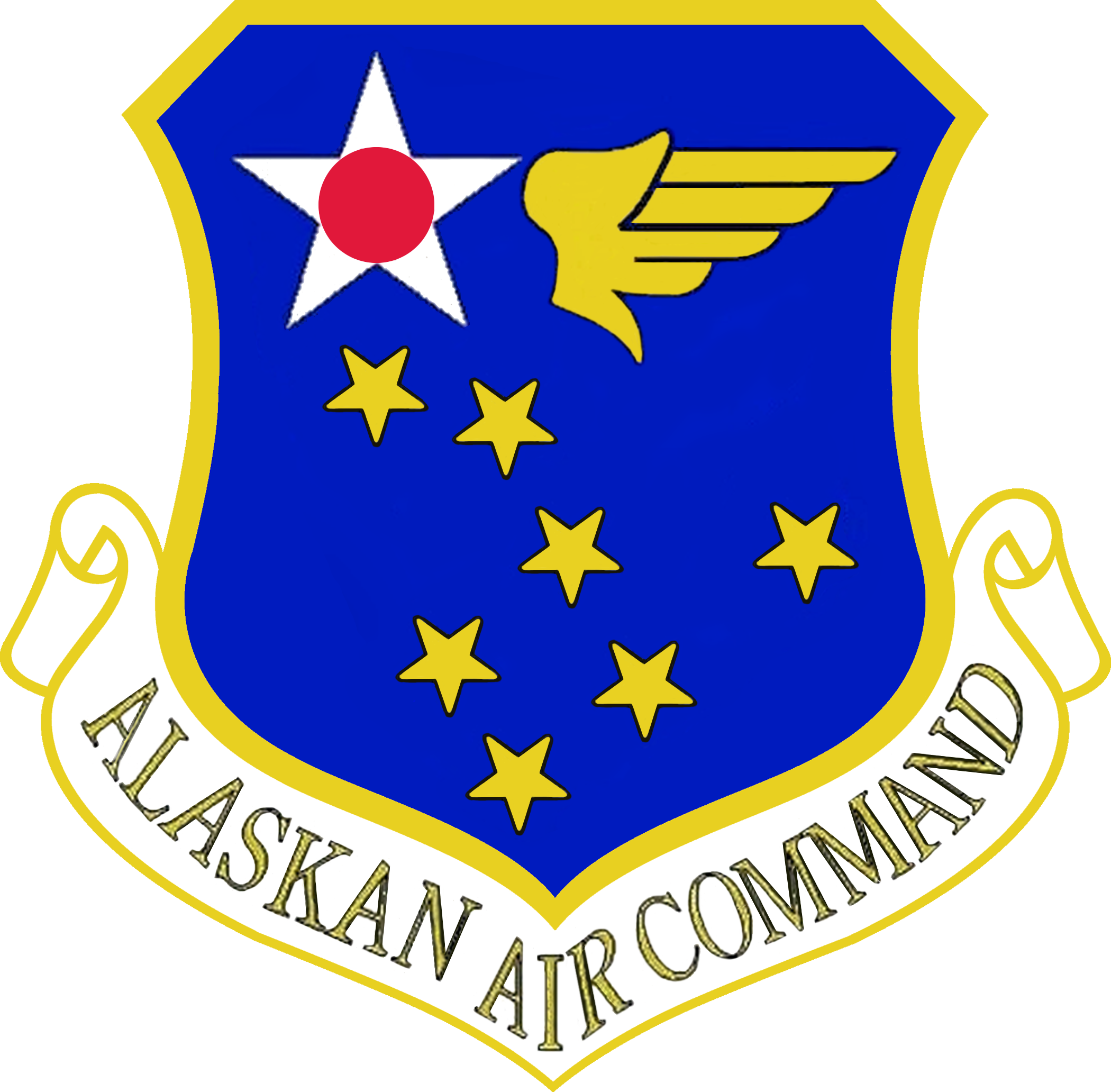
- Shield of Alaskan Air Command
- Active: 18 December 1945 – 9 August 1990 (as Alaskan Air Command); 44
- Country: United States of America
- Branch: United States Air Force (18 September 1947 – 9 August 1990); United States Army ( Army Air Forces, 18 December 1945 – 18 September 1947)
- Part of: Major Command
- Headquarters: Elmendorf AFB, Alaska, U.S.

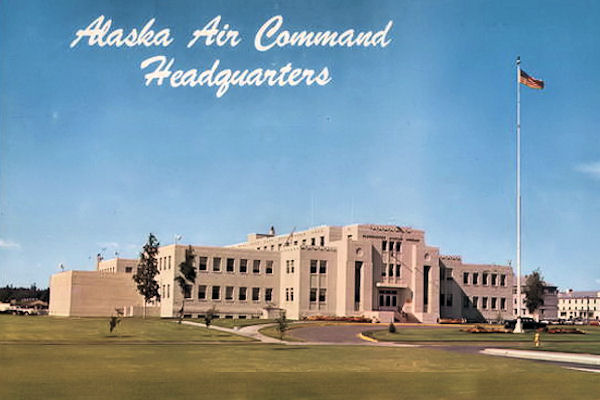
Alaskan Air Command Headquarters Building, Elmendorf Air Force Base, 1960s

The Alaskan Air Command (AAC) is an inactive United States Air Force Major Command originally established in 1942 under the United States Army Air Forces. Its mission was to organize and administer the air defense system of Alaska, exercise direct control of all active measures, and coordinate all passive means of air defense. In addition, the command also supported Strategic Air Command elements operating through and around Alaska. It was redesignated Eleventh Air Force on 9 August 1990 and, concurrently, status changed from a major command of the United States Air Force to a subordinate organization of Pacific Air Forces.

== History ==
=== Establishment ===
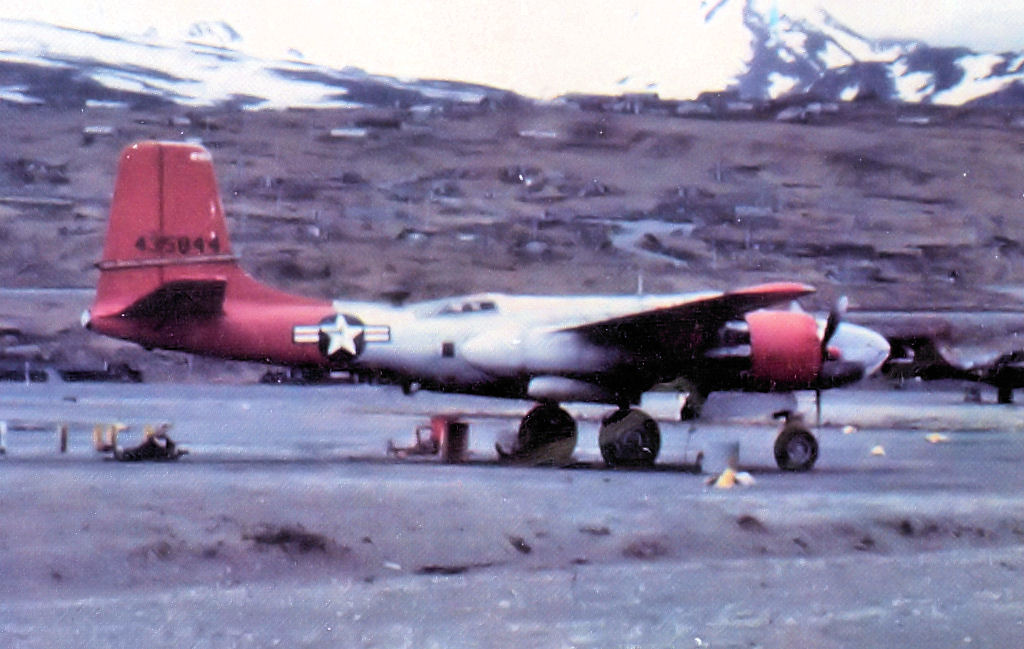
B-26C 44-35844 at Davis AFB, 1948

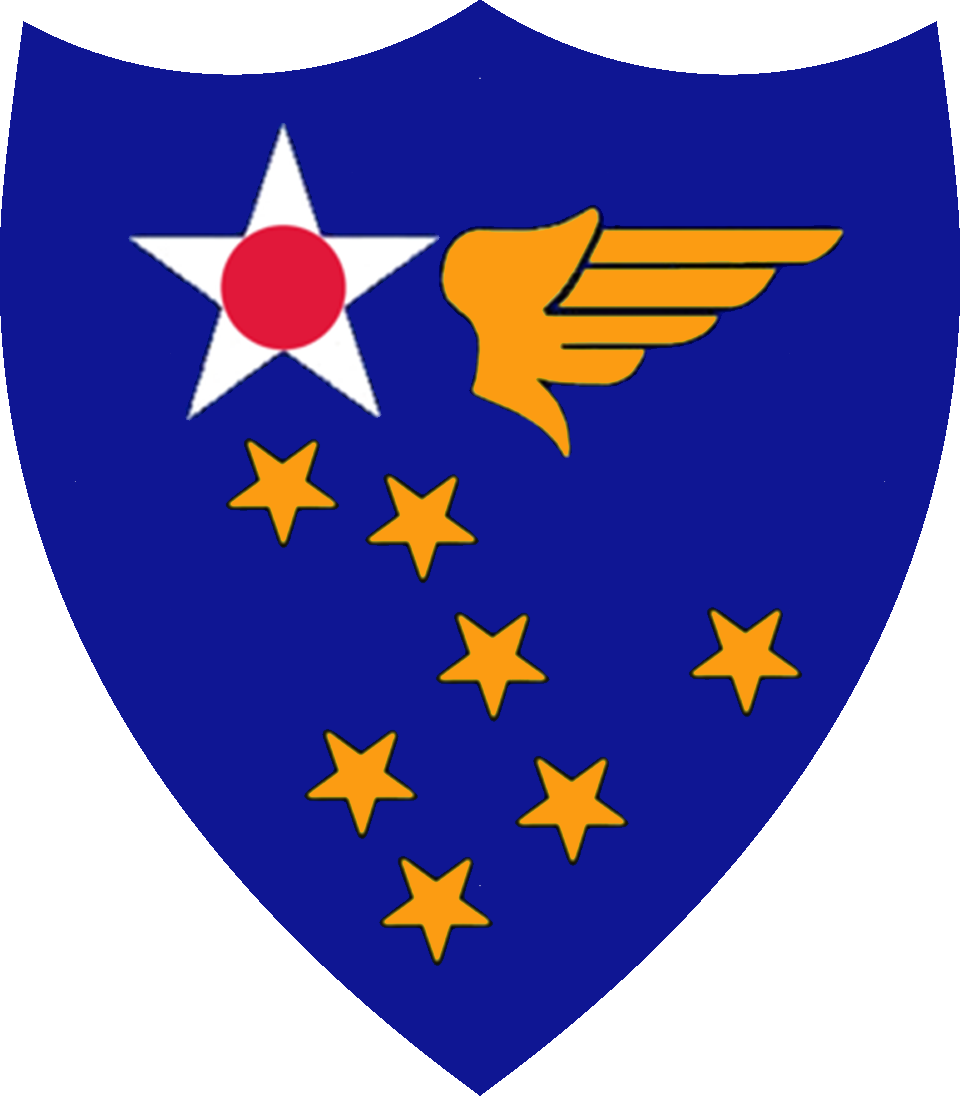
USAAF Alaska Air Command SSI

Established on 18 December 1945 the end of World War II, assuming jurisdiction of former Eleventh Air Force, assets in the Alaska Territory. Headquartered at Davis Army Airfield on Adak, the initial mission of AAC was the consolidation of wartime Army Air Forces in Alaska and training of those forces remaining after demobilization. Its headquarters was moved back to Anchorage, and was re-established at Elmendorf Field on 1 October 1946.

As well as the reorganization of the command and control echelon in Alaska, the 343d Fighter Group at Shemya AAF was inactivated, replaced by the 57th Fighter Group in keeping with the Air Forces policy of retaining low-numbered units on active duty following the war. The 57th FG was equipped with 3 squadrons of very-long range P-51H Mustangs, originally designed for escort missions of B-29 Superfortresses during the war from the Mariana Islands to Japan and back. Two of its squadrons the 64th and 66th were located at Shemya; the 65th at Ladd Field, near Fairbanks. The 449th Fighter Squadron (All Weather) was activated at Davis AFB on 1 September 1947. It was equipped with P-61 Black Widows and assigned directly to Headquarters, AAC. The only other flying unit was the 54th Troop Carrier Squadron at Elmendorf Field.

Despite the wartime military campaign carried out in the Aleutian Islands, the archipelago was viewed as having little military value, other than refueling transport aircraft on the Great Circle Route from Japan. It was believed that Alaska was threatened more by Soviet bomber attacks across the polar regions. Shortly after the Japanese Capitulation, most airfields in the Aleutians were placed in a standby status. Headquarters, Alaskan Air Command was moved to Elmendorf Field on 1 October 1946. The Aleutian Sector was inactivated on 1 July 1947.

Following the National Security Act of 1947, the United States Air Force assumed control of the original Army Fort Richardson and Elmendorf Field, gaining full ownership of its facilities in 1951. The Alaskan Command, established 1 January 1947, and headquartered at Elmendorf, was a unified command under the Joint Chiefs of Staff, based on lessons learned during the war when a lack of coordinated effort hampered operations to drive the Japanese from the western Aleutian Islands of Attu and Kiska. Elmendorf officially became an Air Force base 28 March.

With tight Air Force budgets in the late 1940s, Amchatka AFB was placed in caretaker status in February 1949 and the 449th Fighter Squadron (All Weather) was moved from Davis AFB to Ladd AFB. Cape and Thornborough AFB were inactivated in January 1950; avis AFB was transferred to the Department of the Navy. With the exception of Shemya AFB, the Air Force had no active bases in the Aleutian Islands. Following the Armistice in Korea, Shimeya was declared surplus and inactivated on 1 July 1954.

=== Strategic Air Command ===
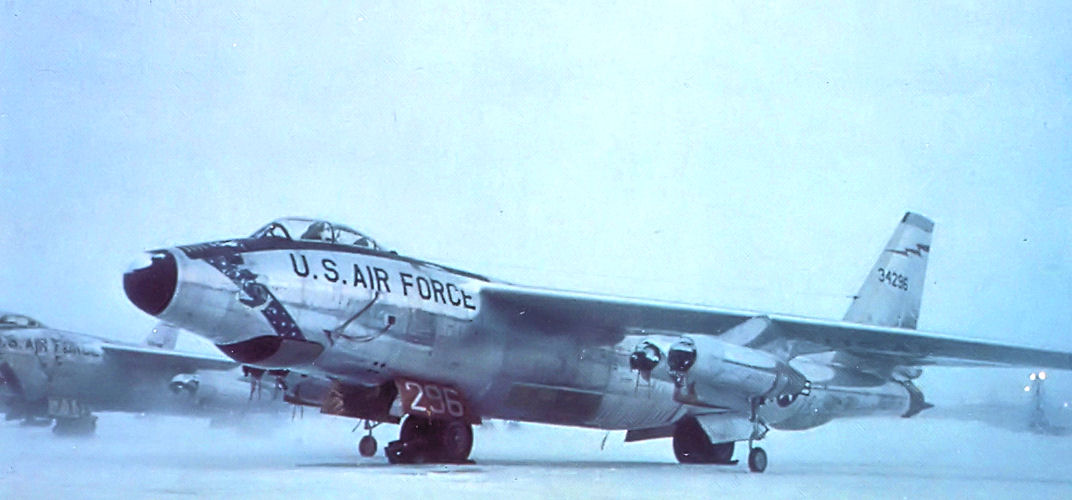
Boeing RB-47H-1-BW Stratojet Serial 53-2496 on the snowy Eielson flightline. This would be the last B-47 in active USAF service, and is now preserved at the Air Force Armament Museum at Eglin AFB, Florida.

Strategic Air Command established a significant presence in Alaska in the late 1940s, initially as a result of its strategic reconnaissance mission. The first efforts were in photo-reconnaissance and mapping, with very long-range B-29 Superfortress reconnaissance aircraft based at Ladd AFB. With growing tensions in US-Soviet relations, SAC explored the possibility of attacking Soviet targets via great circle routes over the North Pole as part of "Project Nanook". Ladd AFB, however, due to the geography of its location, was unsuitable for SAC's postwar B-36 Peacemaker bomber as well as the new jet B-47 Stratojet. Ladd, being sited next to the Chena River, could not have its runway expanded to meet the requirements for these new aircraft.

SAC chose to expand Ladd's former World War II Air Transport Command satellite field, known as "Mile 26" due to its distance from Fairbanks. The airfield's jurisdiction had been transferred from ATC to Eleventh Air Force on 1 November 1945, but had remained a satellite of Ladd Field, and was in a standby status. Mile 26, later known as Eielson AFB had its runway lengthened to 14,500 feet and a major construction project was undertaken to expand and build new support facilities at the base in the late 1940s. The new runway at Eielson was the longest runway in North America at the time. Its planned usage was to support SAC deployments of its intercontinental bombers closer to the Soviet Union for possible attacks over the Arctic. The first use of Eielson was by the SAC 97th Bombardment Group, deployed from Smoky Hill AAB, Kansas in November 1947. The group departed in March 1948, with the 5010th Air Base Wing being activated by AAC as a permanent host unit for Eielson, supporting deployed SAC units from the CONUS. Other SAC units followed and Eielson hosted B-29, B-36, B-47 and B-50 wings, which were placed on alert there and ready to strike on a moment's notice. These deployments lasted until 1963. Eielson also hosted deployed KC-97s, and later KC-135s tanker aircraft.

SAC activated its provisional 4157th Combat Support Group (later Strategic Wing) at Eielson in July 1956 to support additional B-47 Wing deployments to Alaska in addition to 4158th Strategic Wing to support RC-135 electronic intelligence (ELINT) operations from Elmendorf on 1 July 1960. The 4158th SW provided host station support functions for SAC wing and support elements deployed to Elmendorf during deployments from United States bases, primarily weather reconnaissance flights used for long range detection of Soviet Soviet atomic explosions with RC-135 operations. The 4158th SW inactivated in 1966 when SAC moved out of Elmendorf.

The 4157th Strategic Wing was replaced at Eielson by the 6th Strategic Wing in March 1967. The 6th SW remained stationed at Eielson until being inactivated on 1 September 1992 as part of the reorganization of the USAF command structure after the collapse of the Soviet Union.

=== Cold War ===
The outbreak of the Cold War in 1948 caused a major buildup of air defense forces in Alaska, as the airspace over the Arctic and Alaska was believed by Air Force planners to be the "Front Line" in case of an armed conflict between the United States and the Soviet Union for the North American continent.

Alaskan Air Command was initially divided into two air defense sectors – Aleutian and Yukon. The defense of the Yukon sector was initially directed from Ladd AFB, near Fairbanks, Alaska. In 1950, the 11th Air Division (11th AD) was activated at Ladd, replacing the Yukon Sector; the 10th Air Division (10th AD) at Elmendorf AFB, replacing the Aleutian Sector.

The 10th AD was responsible for the Aircraft Control and Warning (Radar) stations in southern Alaska and for the 64th, 65th and 66th Fighter-Interceptor Squadrons which were assigned directly to the division after the 57th FIG was inactivated in April 1953. King Salmon Airport (AFB) was used as a Forward Operating Base (FOB) for the interceptors of the 66th FIS. King Salmon (formerly the Eleventh Air Force Naknek AAF) began being used as a FOB in 1948

The 11th AD was responsible for the Radar stations north of the Alaska Range to the northern coast along the Arctic Ocean and for the 449th Fighter-Interceptor Squadron based at Ladd AFB. Galena Airport (AFB) was also used as a forward operating base for the interceptors beginning in 1951. Prior to that the 449th had used Marks AFB at Nome, but Nome was deemed too close to the Soviet border and the interceptors were pulled back in order for them to have more reaction time on intercept alerts.

Alaska's air defenses greatly expanded during 1945–1955 period. The United States built an extensive aircraft control and warning (AC&W) system along Alaska's coast and interior. The Alaskan segment of the Distant Early Warning Line (DEW Line) was built, and later the DEW Line was extended to the Aleutian Islands. The White Alice Communications System tied the network together.

By 1957, Alaskan Air Command had reached its peak strength with over 200 fighter interceptors assigned to six Air Defense squadrons in addition to Strategic Air Command elements operating through and around Alaska, and performing other operational support missions as directed by the Commander-in-Chief, Alaskan Command HQ and Headquarters USAF. AAC maintained Fifteen major air force bases, Eighteen aircraft control and warning sites and 12 DEW Line locations provided early warning and fighter direction. AAC's assigned strength was 20,687.

Defense Department budget reductions in the second half of the Eisenhower Administration began a steady decline in AAC, along with the Soviet switch from a bomber force to an intercontinental missiles as its major offensive weapon. The introduction of the F-102 Delta Dagger in 1958 to upgrade AAC's interceptor force meant a reduction of the number of squadrons from six to three.

Reductions in Alaskan Air Command forces continued in 1959. In September the Air Force informed AAC that Ladd AFB had been selected along with other bases in the United States for closure. The closure would mean the reassignment of forces at Ladd to nearby Eielson AFB and also some to Elmendorf due to economic necessities. In addition, it was justified that the short runway at Ladd would be compensated by the 14,000 foot runway at Eielson built by SAC. It was also planned that the Army, which maintained units at both Ladd and Eielson, would consolidate its forces, and its northern headquarters, Yukon Command, at Ladd. Discussions and political disagreement ensued throughout 1960, however the Army's decision to station a new battle group at Ladd and increase the number of personnel assigned there settled the matter. On 1 January 1961 jurisdiction of Ladd Air Force Base was transferred from the Department of the Air Force to the Department of the Army. The army renamed the facility Fort Wainwright, in honor of Lieutenant General Jonathan Mayhew Wainwright IV. The airfield, was re-designated as "Ladd Field", in honor of its long Air Force service. With the closure of Ladd, the 449th FIS was inactivated on 25 August 1960, its F-89Js being reassigned to Air Defense Command.

Along with the closure of Ladd AFB, AAC inactivated the 10th and 11th Air Divisions in August 1960. They were replaced by the provisional 5070th Air Defense Wing, based at Elmendorf. The 5070th, was quickly inactivated in October 1961, its assets being assigned directly to AAC.

==== Interceptors ====
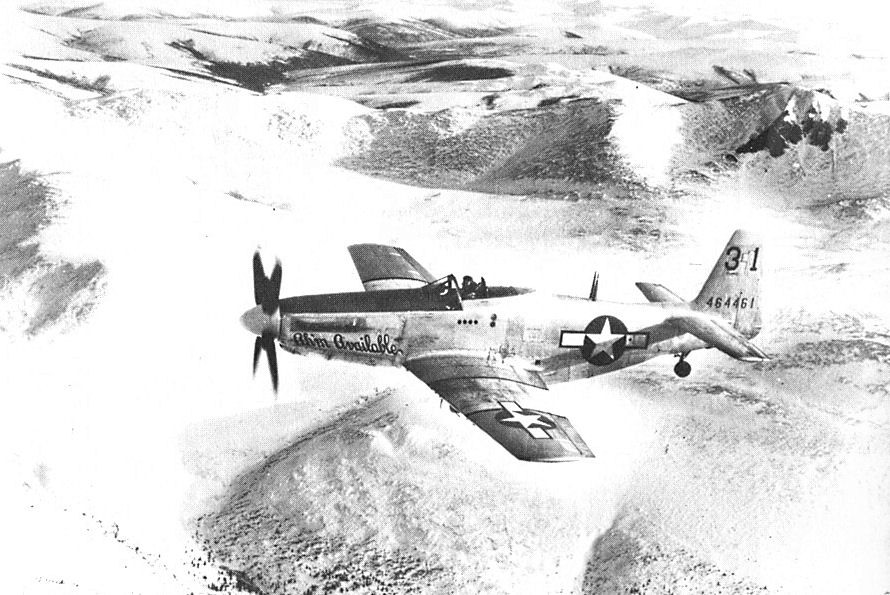
Alaskan Air Command P-51H 44-64461

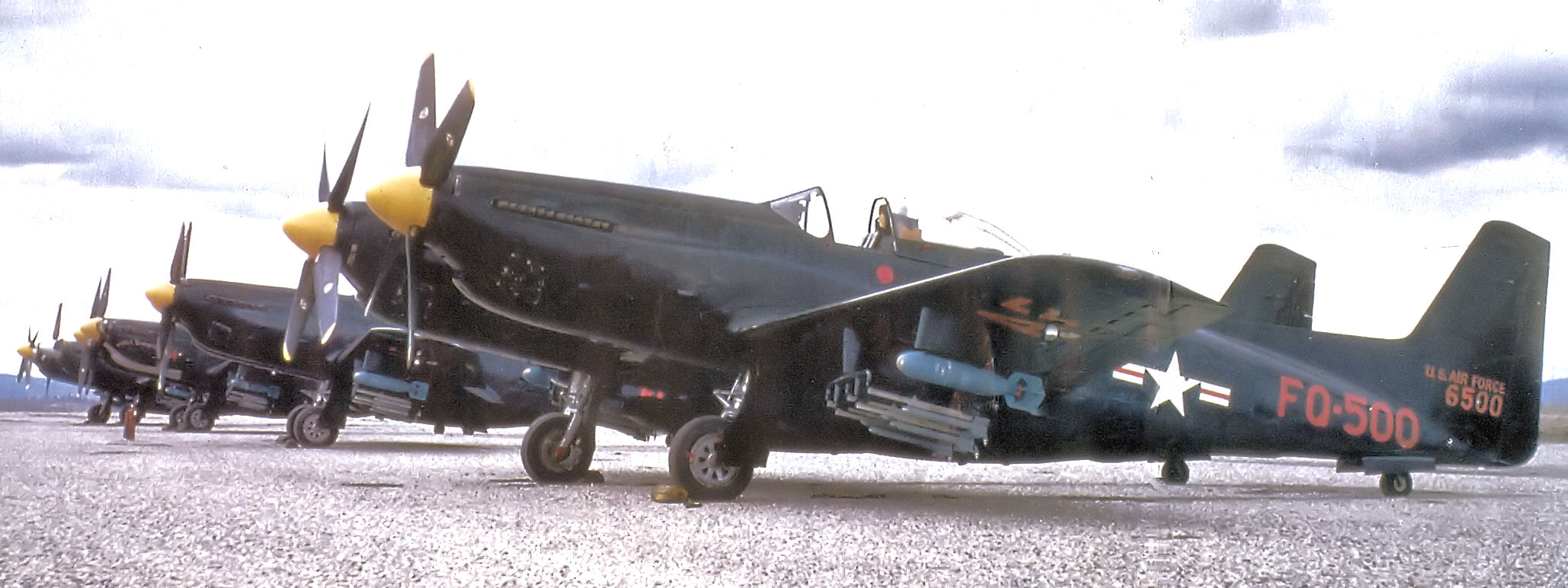
North American P-82H Twin Mustang 46-500 449th AWS Ladd AFB, 1951

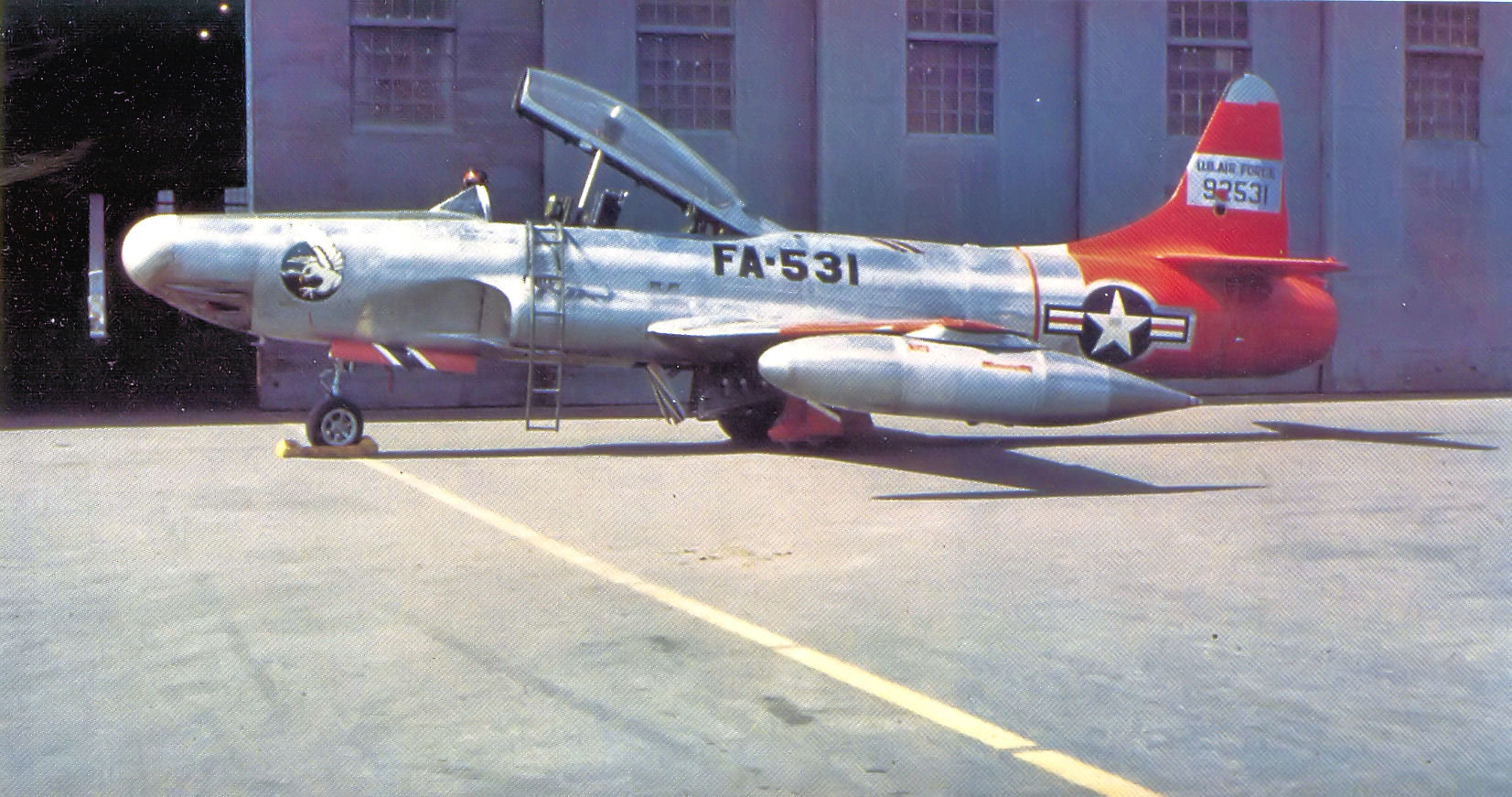
449th Fighter Interceptor Squadron Lockheed F-94A-5-LO 49-2531, Ladd AFB

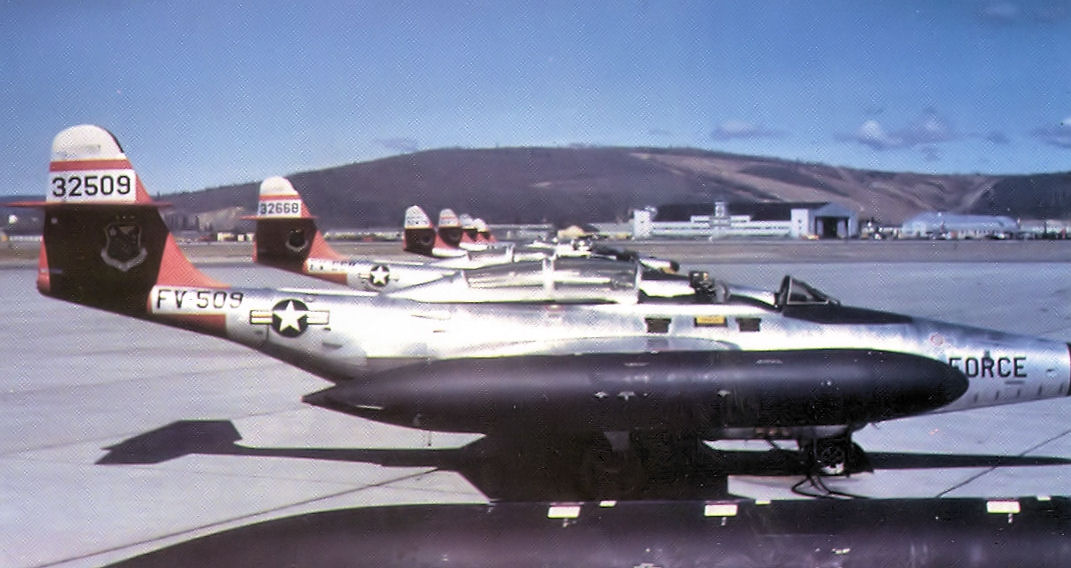
449th Fighter Interceptor Squadron Northrup F-89J-55-NO Scorpion 53-2509, Ladd AFB

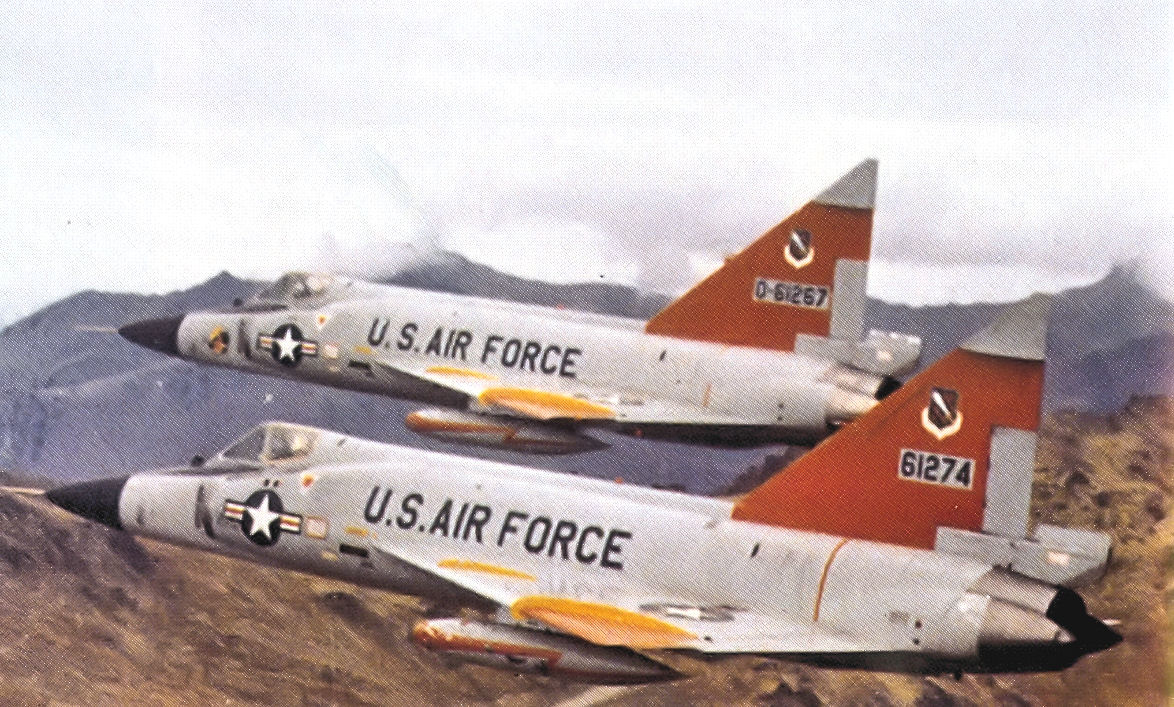
Two 317th Fighter Interceptor Squadron F-102 interceptors based at Elmendorf AFB, 1965. 56-1274 was retired to MASDC as FJ0361 March 4, 1975. Converted to PQM-102B. 56-1267 was retired to MASDC as FJ0331 September 29, 1974. Both aircraft were later converted to QF-102A, later to PQM-102B drones and later expended as an aerial target during the 1980s at Holloman AFB, New Mexico. Note: The plane marked as 56-1274 displayed at Elmendorf AFB, Alaska is actually 56-1053.

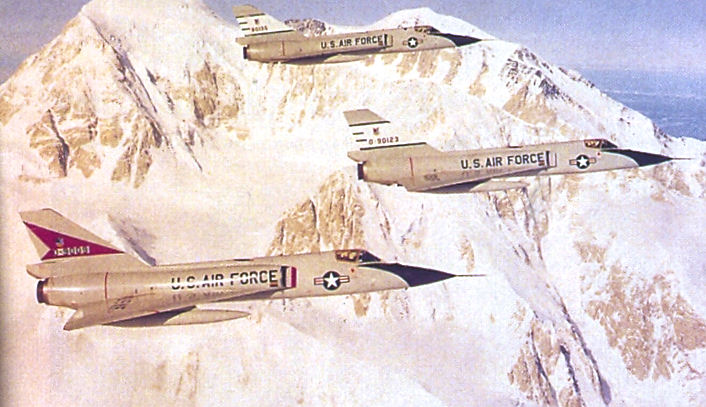
Air Defense Command F-106s Flying Past Mount McKinley

AAC interceptor squadrons were initially equipped with the very long-range P-51H Mustang, that was designed for B-29 escort duties for missions over Japan. The F-51 (post 1948 designation) was a fast, efficient fighter that could perform close air support missions, but was not an effective air defense interceptor because it lacked radar and did not have the speed and altitude capabilities needed to intercept high-altitude bombers.

Replaced by the P-61 Black Widow (1947), and later by the F-82 Twin Mustang (1948) (449th FIS), these World War II-designed aircraft were equally unsuited for modern air defense operations. Although the Black Widow and Twin Mustang were radar-equipped, they did not perform well in adverse weather and suffered from the speed and altitude deficiencies as the F-51H.

The first-generation jet aircraft assigned to AAC were F-80 Shooting Stars which arrived in 1948. The jets had a much faster rate of climb than their World War II propeller-driven predecessors, but lacked radar to find the bombers it was being used to intercept. However, it served its purpose by introducing AAC to the jet age. Its successor, the F-94 Starfire in 1951 was essentially an upgraded F-80 with a radar operator and was better equipped for all-weather operations. It also was afterburner-equipped for higher interceptor speeds.

The F-94s replaced most of the Twin Mustangs of the 449th FIS at Ladd, however about a dozen F-82s (of various types) were retained due to their longer flight endurance and their ground support capability that the F-94 lacked. Army ground units in Alaska were very limited in their movements due to the geography of the land. Most movements were up and down roads and paths and railroad rights-of-way. The F-82s would fly low along the terrain then pop up and initiate simulated strafing runs against them, causing the troops to take cover by hitting the muddy tundra. On occasions, the Twin Mustangs would also drop tear gas canisters, simulating gas attacks on the units.

The F-82s, however, had no logistical support available and were maintained by cannibalization of un-flyable aircraft, with the last few replacement aircraft coming from Japan when Far East Air Forces sent some lower-hour airframes to Ladd after being withdrawn from Korean War combat and weather reconnaissance operations. The ones received from FEAF, however, were in a badly corroded condition and required much effort to keep them operational.

About 100 F-94A and B models arrived at Ladd, enough to equip all three interceptor squadrons. Of the 10 remaining Twin Mustangs, only one or two were operational at any one time. Another useful use of the Twin Mustangs was their ability to perform reconnaissance along the Siberian border and monitor Soviet use of former Lend-Lease auxiliary airfields near the coast. Eventually the lack of logistical support for the F-82 made them simply unserviceable, the last Twin Mustang being grounded in October 1953 and was dropped from the inventory rolls.

The F-86H Sabre-equipped 720th Fighter-Bomber Squadron was activated in December 1953 to evaluate the use of the Sabre as an interceptor. However, it was determined that the same mission could be performed by rotating existing Tactical Air Command squadrons from the CONUS to Alaska instead. The 21st Fighter-Bomber Wing, based at George AFB, California began two-week rotational TDY F-86 deployments to Eielson AFB until November 1954 when it was reassigned to France.

Air Defense Command F-89C Scorpions, replacing the F-94s, began to be received in September 1953. They were initially assigned to the 65th FIS. Two more F-89 squadrons, the 18th and 433d, were assigned to Ladd in 1954. The F-89s were an improvement of the Starfires, and functioned well in the extreme arctic conditions of central Alaska. The F-89s eventually replaced all other interceptors in AAC, which by 1957 consisted of six squadrons and about 200 aircraft. They were maintained on constant alert at the two main bases at Ladd and Elmendorf, and the two forward operating airfields at King Salmon and Galena. Directed by the AC&W Control Centers at Fire Island AFS and Murphy Dome AFS, along with the regional control center at Elmendorf, the interceptors were ready to intercept any unknown aircraft penetrating Alaskan airspace.

AAC planners had pushed both the Air Force and Air Defense Command for the assignment of the Convair F-102 Delta Dagger to Alaska as a replacement for the F-89. The guided-missile-equipped Delta Dart interceptor was far superior to the machine-gun-equipped Scorpion, along with increased speed and range and having a higher operational ceiling. Additionally, fewer F-102s could be utilized than the F-89, which meant a reduction in the number of interceptor squadrons without the loss of capability. Plans were made to reduce the number of interceptor squadrons from six to four, with two each at Ladd and Elmendorf. This was a complex operation which involved the reassignment of units between AAC and Air Defense Command.

The F-102s began arriving in Alaska in August 1957 when the 317th Fighter Interceptor Squadron arrived at Elmendorf from McChord AFB, Washington. The 31st Fighter-Interceptor Squadron arrived later that month from Wurtsmith AFB, Michigan. The three F-89 squadrons were taken off operational status and prepared for reassignment back to the CONUS. The 64th FIS departed for McChord AFB in August; the 65th to Richards-Gebaur AFB, Missouri in November, and the 66th FIS was reassigned to Oxnard AFB, California in November.

Instead of receiving two F-102 squadrons, HQ USAF decided to reduce the number of squadrons at Ladd to one. The 449th FIS was re-equipped with the AIM-4 Falcon missile capable F-89J Scorpion. The 18th FIS was reassigned to Wurtsmith AFB and the 433d was reassigned to Minot AFB, North Dakota. This left AAC with three interceptor squadrons in Alaska, two F-102 squadrons at Elmendorf and the one F-89 squadron at Ladd. However, in October 1958, the 31st FIS was inactivated at Elmendorf, its aircraft and personnel transferred to the 317th FIS, making it a double-sized squadron.

In March 1959, Air Force planners received a nasty surprise when radar operators along Alaska's western coast spotted on their screens a Soviet reconnaissance aircraft flying close to the Alaskan coast, but in international airspace. Two F-102s, dispatched from Galena, intercepted two Tupolev Tu-16E or F "Badger" jet bombers just at the edge of their effective range. It was also found that the F-102 proved unequal to the task of intercepting other Soviet reconnaissance aircraft due to their limited range. In March 1963, a Soviet reconnaissance bomber overflew Nunivak Island and the west coast of Alaska. Two F-102s were scrambled from King Salmon but the pilots had to be recalled because of low fuel when they were within 20 miles of the Soviet aircraft. This led to a serious debate about AAC's capabilities and the decision to replace the F-102s with the Convair F-106 Delta Dart from Air Defense Command. The first eight F-106s temporarily deployed from ADC arrived at King Salmon and Galena Airports in July 1963. In September, the F-106s succeeded in intercepting two TU-16s over the Bering Sea.

Production, however, of the F-106 had ended in 1961, and Air Defense Command had none to send to Alaska. In late 1961, Kennedy's Secretary of Defense Robert S. McNamara spoke of reopening the F-106 production line to build another 36 aircraft. However, ADC had heard so much about the capabilities of the Navy's F4H-1 Phantom two-seat interceptor that it thought that it might be a better idea to purchase some F4H-1s rather than buy additional F-106s. Instead, ADC chose to begin rotational deployments of the F-106 to Elmendorf AFB and onto Galena and King Salmon for alert duty. That arrangement continued until 1970, when the F-4E Phantom II arrived at Elmendorf.

==== Radar Surveillance ====
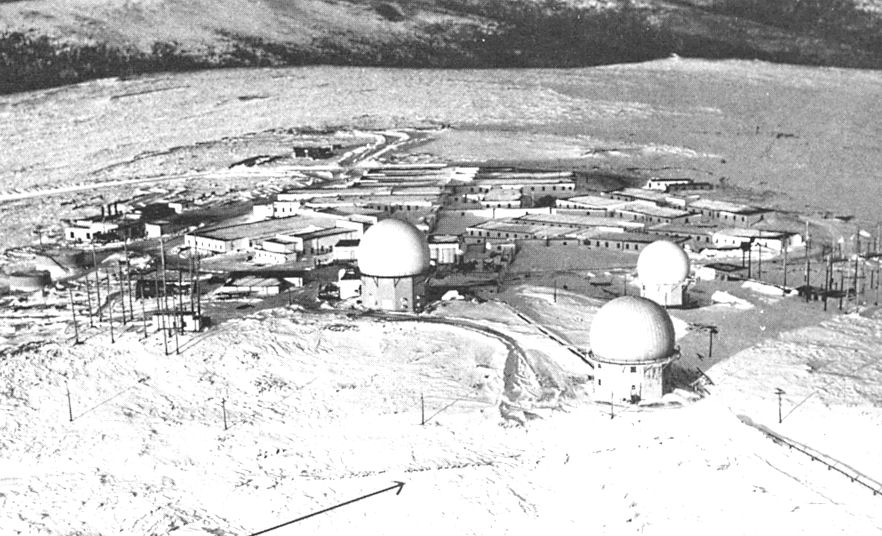
Murphy Dome AFS, Near Fairbanks in winter

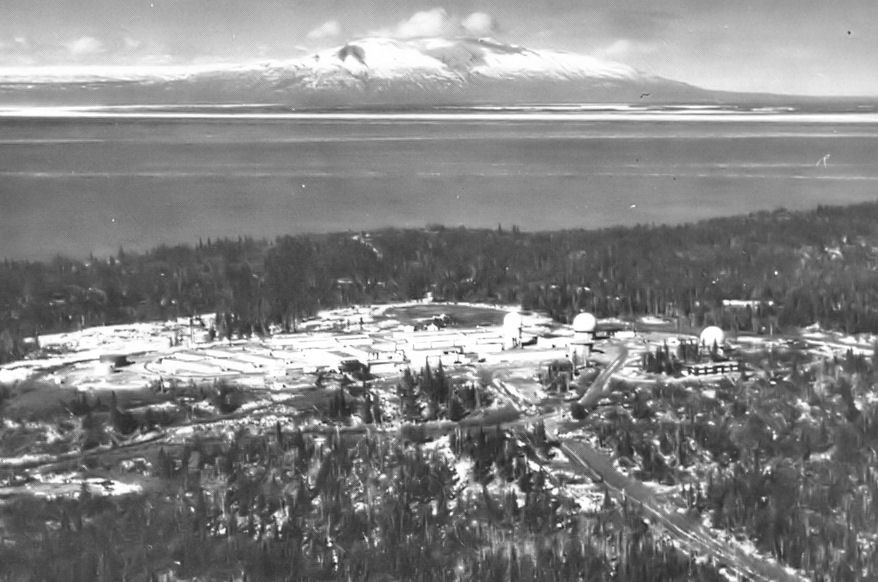
Fire Island AFS, Near Anchorage

Under Eleventh Air Force, a radar system was set up to warn of Japanese attacks which stretched from Point Barrow to Shemya, however it was dismantled after the end of the war. With the breakout of the Cold War, plans were made by Alaskan Air Command to establish a new system for air defense. Discussions ensued and several plans were proposed and modified, until in 1948 a plan was agreed on and funded by Congress in 1949 for ten radar sites for Alaska.

Early-warning radars would be located at Elmendorf AFB, Ladd AFB, King Salmon and Gambrell on St. Lawrence Island. These radars would alert the interceptors of the 57th Fighter Group at Elmendorf, with radars north of the Alaska Range alerting the 449th Fighter Squadron at Ladd AFB.

By 1950, planners had made their final site selections for a permanent Aircraft Control and Warning system. Five early-warning surveillance sites were located on the western Alaskan coast: Cape Lisburne; Cape Newenham; Cape Romanzof; Tin City and Northeast Cape on St. Lawrence Island.

Those coastal sites were supplemented by three interior intermediate ground control intercept (GGI) sites, Campion, Tatalina, and King Salmon. Finally two master GCI sites at Murphy Dome and Fire Island. An additional two internal early-warning sites were added in 1951 at Indian Mountain and Sparrevohn to fill gaps in the radar coverage.

Construction began in 1950 and was plagued by unexpected issues, the remoteness of the sites and weather conditions being compounded by labor issues and logistical problems. Murphy Dome AFS, near Fairbanks and Fire Island AFS near Anchorage were completed first and became operational in September 1951. King Salmon AFS came online in October 1951; Tatalina AFS and Campion AFS activated in April 1952. The remote sites took much longer. Cape Lisburne AFS activated in February 1953; Cape Romanzof AFS, Tin City AFS and Northeast Cape AFS activated in April 1953. Lastly, Cape Newenham AFS activated in April 1954. Sparrevohn AFS, begun in June 1951 activated in March 1954 and Indian Mountain AFS became operational in November 1953.

Additional gaps in the radar coverage were identified and six more sites were funded, with construction beginning in 1955 for Middleton Island AFS, Ohlson Mountain AFS, Bethel AFS, Fort Yukon AFS, Unalakleet AFS and Kotzebue AFS. The additional sites were all operational by July 1958.

In addition to the radar sites, landing strips, approximately 4,000' in length were constructed at the radar sites to accommodate medium transports, such as C-123 Provider and later C-130 Hercules capable of landing on rough runways. Also light observation aircraft were used for transport of emergency light cargo and personnel to and from the sites.

Once the radar project were underway, AAC turned its attention to improving its air defense data processing and weapons control functions. In May 1955. AAC studied both the SAGE and Base Air Defense Ground Environment (BADGE) system and concluded that the BADGE system would best meet its needs. BADE linked the GCI and surveillance radar sites to Combined Operations Control (COC) centers at Murphy Dome and Fire Island.

As budgetary reductions affected the command and control, as well as the fighter defense of Alaska in the late 1950s, the Aircraft Control and Warning System was not immune. In 1963, AAC reviewed the radar system and made recommendations that the Bethel, Middleton Island and Ohlson Mountain sited be closed. The Air Force concurred with this study, and the three sites were inactivated in May 1963. In addition, the manual AC&W system was upgraded to the Semi Automatic Ground Environment (SAGE) automated system

==== White Alice Communications System ====
The White Alice Communications System (WACS) was built in the mid-1950s to provide improved communications for the United States Air Force Alaskan Aircraft Control and Warning (AC&W) radar stations.

Communications were initially provided by a high frequency radio system which proved unreliable because of atmospheric disturbances in the high latitudes. AAC, after investigating various options, decided to build a system of Air Force-owned tropospheric scatter transmitters that bounced radio signals off the Troposphere, and microwave radio relay sites over short ranges of about 50 miles. The WACS provided these stations with reliable, quality telecommunications.

The White Alice system was operated by civilian contractors, under the control of the Air Force Communications Service, although a few USAF-manned sites operated along the Distant Early Warning Line (DEW Line). It operated until the late 1970s, replaced by satellite communications technology. The White Alice sites and their antennas are now being torn down, nothing remaining but flattened mountain tops

==== Distant Early Warning Line ====
Alaskan Air Command's interest in the DEW Line started in the spring of 1953 when it was asked to logistically support the installation of several experimental radars built between Barter Island and Point Barrow. In 1954, once the experimental line of radars (called project Counterchange, then project Corrode, then Project 572) was proven, the USAF proceeded to install the rest of the DEW line.

AAC operated two complete and one partial segments along Alaskan north coast from the Canada–US border westward and in the Aleutian Islands. Cape Lisburne AFS doubled as a DEW line site and an AAC radar surveillance site. All sites were equipped with the AN/FPS-23 continuous wave "fluttar" (Doppler Effect) radar. AN/FPS-19 search radars consisting of two identical radar sets feeding a dual (back to back) antenna were installed at Point Lay, Wainwright, Point Barrow (main station), Lonely, Oliktok, Barter Island (main station), and Flaxman Island. Construction started in 1955 and was completed in 1957. It tied into the AAC Aircraft Control and Warning System though the White Alice network of 33 troposcatter and microwave sites. Unlike the AAC radars, the DEW line stations were manned by civilian contractors, who operated the stations on 18-month renewable contracts.

In 1959, the Aleutian segment of the DEW line became operational. Six additional AN/FPS-19 search set sites were built at Cold Bay (main site), and Nikolski, Port Heiden, Port Moller, Cape Sarichef, and Driftwood Bay (auxiliary sites). It was also tied into the White Alice communication network.

==== NORAD and the Alaskan NORAD Region ====
Canada joined the United States to set up the North American Air Defense Command (NORAD) on an interim basis on 7 August 1957 based on an agreement between the Canadian Minister of National Defence (under authority from the new Prime Minister) and the United States Secretary of Defense. Formal confirmation of the new agreement was provided by the two governments on 12 May 1958 (the date of the opening session of the 1958 Canadian Parliament).

Alaska became part of NORAD when the Alaska NORAD Region (ANR) was activated at Elmendorf AFB on 5 August 1958. The Commander in Chief, Alaskan Command was dual hatted as the Commander ANR. Alaskan Air Command was at its peak air defense strength when operational control of Alaskan air defense forces was transferred to the newly established North American Air Defense Command (NORAD).

In 1961, the AAC COC system was replaced with a combined ANR Control Center (ANRCC) at Elmendorf. and the COC at Murphy Dome AFS became an alternate for the ANRCC. Alaska's two air defense sectors were combined with the introduction of the new ANRCC, and ANR became responsible for all of Alaska's airspace. It was connected to NORAD by microwave sites (B-route) down the Alaska Highway and undersea cable from Ketchikan to Seattle (A-route) to Cheyenne Mountain.

In 1965, the ANRCC became automated with the operational activation of the AN/FYQ-9 Data Processing and Display system. Prior to the FYQ-9 installation, ANR had to manually track and plot aircraft tracks. The AN/FYQ-9 also provided increased data processing speed for air defense data sent from the Alaskan radar sites to Elmendorf AFB.

==== Arctic Drift Stations ====
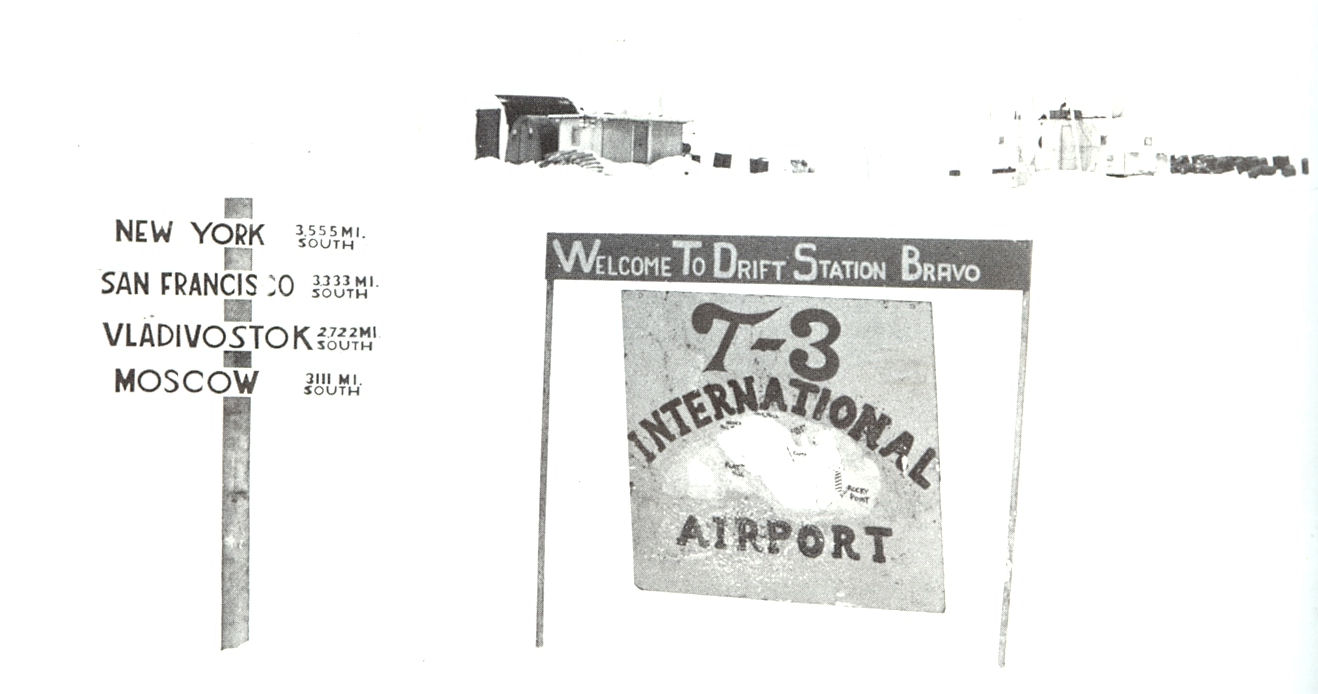
Welcome sign at Drift Station "T-3", about 1960.

From 1946 to 1961, the Air force engaged in observations of polar ice pack phenomena which resulted in the support of three major manned ice stations. In August 1946, a SAC WB-29 flying over the Arctic noticed what appeared to be an island where no known land existed. Subsequent investigations determined that it was a floating mass of ice which closely resembled an island. It became known as "Target X", later designated "T-1". T-1 was monitored for three years, as it drifted over 1,500 miles and finally disappeared near Greenland in 1949.

The Russians had begun drift station research a decade earlier. In 1937, they undertook scientific experiments from a drifting ice station near the North Pole, and they had followed that up after the war with an accelerated program of ice pack investigations.

In July 1950, "T-2" was spotted about 300 miles south of the North Pole. About a week later "T-3" was spotted 300 miles east of the Soviet Wrangel Island as it drifted towards the North Pole. After studies and testing of proposed Ice Station research north of Point Barrow, in March 1952, a C-47 was landed successfully on T-3. During the 1950s, the Ice Station established there hosted joint military-civilian scientific parties during several lengthy occupations under "Project Icicle". Under Project Ice Skate, the station was used again during the International Geophysical Year (IGY) of 1957–58 and beyond. Over the years, T-3 drifted across the Arctic basin, leaving the zone of AAC support periodically, and occasionally drifting close to Soviet waters across the International Date Line.

During the IGY, when T-3 had drifted to Greenland, two other stations were established in the western Arctic as pack ice stations. Ice Station Alpha was occupied from 1957-late 1958. When it began to break up, crews established a new station the following spring. Known as Ice Station Charlie, it lasted ten months before meeting the same fate. In 1961, USAF ended its sponsorship of ice station research, turning its remaining facilities on T-3 over to the Navy.

==== Ballistic Missile Early Warning System ====
Budget reductions beginning in the late 1950s and the demands of the Vietnam War in the 1960s led to a major reduction in AAC's forces.

The development of Intercontinental ballistic missiles (ICBM) and Submarine-launched ballistic missiles forced Air Force planners to redirect its air defensive systems for ballistic missile detection and warning and space surveillance, and the atmospheric detection and warning system, which had been in an almost continuous state of expansion and improvement since the late 1940s, went into decline. The number of fighter interceptor squadrons shrank to one, the 10th and 11th air divisions were inactivated in 1960, and the aircraft control and warning sites declined to 13. In 1961, the Department of Defense consigned Ladd Air Force Base to the Army, which renamed it Fort Wainwright.

The Ballistic Missile Early Warning System (BMEWS), which was completed in 1963 after five years of intensive effort provided a capability of detecting missiles in flight, deep in the Soviet Union or in other similarly distant territory. Clear Air Force Station was initially established in Central Alaska near Anderson as a BMEWS (Ballistic Missile Early Warning System) mechanical radar site to detect and track intercontinental ballistic missiles (ICBMs). The site was later upgraded to phased array radar and expanded early detection and tracking to include sea launched ballistic missiles (SLBMs).

==== 1964 earthquake ====
The 1964 Good Friday earthquake (27 March) measured 9.2 on the moment magnitude scale and struck south central Alaska at around 1736 local time, killing 115 people and causing property damage in excess of $750 million. The major shaking lasted two to three minutes. The Alaskan Air Command had no specific plan to deal with the earthquake since it focus had been on war planning. The war planning, however, prepared it for dealing with the natural disaster. The earthquake severely damaged Anchorage International Airport and destroyed its control tower and left only 3,000 feet of usable runway.

Operations were shifted to Elmendorf AFB, whose control tower was also destroyed. Major structural damages were sustained to the following Elmendorf AFB buildings and facilities: three AAC headquarters buildings, three airmen dormitories, telephone and telegraph buildings, and the base hospital. Base operations and passenger terminal, bowling alley, alert hangar, field house, auto hobby shop, commissary warehouse, central heat and power plant, POL tanks and lines and base roads also received damage. The estimated repair damages came to $12,346,000. The water, sewage, electrical, communications and heating infrastructure received considerable damages.

The earthquake damaged 14 F-102As. Most of the damage resulted from light fixtures falling from the roof of hangars onto the aircraft causing skin damages. Other aircraft were similarly damaged. Maintenance personnel were able to remove all 26 aircraft that were parked in the hangars by 1800. No fires occurred despite the fact that fuel was on the hangar floors and the light fixtures that fell were still hot.

==== Military Airlift Command ====
Air Transport Command (ATC) aircraft began using the Great Circle Route from Japan to the United States beginning with a film of the Japanese Capitulation on 2 September being flown from Japan to Washington, D.C., in under 48 hours. Later Military Air Transport Service (MATS) used Shemya and Davis AFB as refueling stops during the 1950s. MATS established the 1727th Air Support Squadron at Elmendorf in July 1950, and the squadron provided aerial port service for AAC with cargo and personnel C-124 Globemaster flights from McChord AFB, Washington.

In 1966, Elmendorf also began providing more support for Military Airlift Command (MAC) (now Air Mobility Command) with C-5 Galaxy and C-141 Starlifter flights to and from the Far East becoming a common sight with the expansion of the aerial port at the base (602d Military Airlift Support Squadron) in January 1966 for airlift supporting the Southeast Asia requirements. Initially referred to as Fly Fast, the operational name was changed in 1967 to Combat Pacer. This was upgraded to the 616th Military Airlift Group in 1975, and remains a part of the 3d Group today at Elmendorf.

MAC also used Eielson AFB, Shemya AFS and King Salmon and Galena as stops for its aircraft. In addition to MAC aircraft, C-130s also initially used Elmendorf AFB as a stopover base for Southeast Asia operations. On 1 October 1967, the Air Force switched C-130s to the Central Pacific route.

==== Realignment ====
In 1966, the Air Force 21st Composite Wing was activated at Elmendorf AFB, replacing the AAC provisional 5040th Air Base Wing which was inactivated. All of the AAC's flying units were assigned to the new Air Force wing's control. AAC, however, retained control of the radar aircraft control and warning sites until 1977, when the USAF 531st Aircraft Control and Warning Group was activated and the AC&W squadrons were assigned to its control.

The 21st Composite Wing brought the following squadrons under its control:

- 17th Troop Carrier Squadron, C-130s
- 317th Fighter Interceptor Squadron, F-102s
- 21st Operations Squadron, C-118, C-123, EC-54, ET-33, EB-57, H-21 and U-6

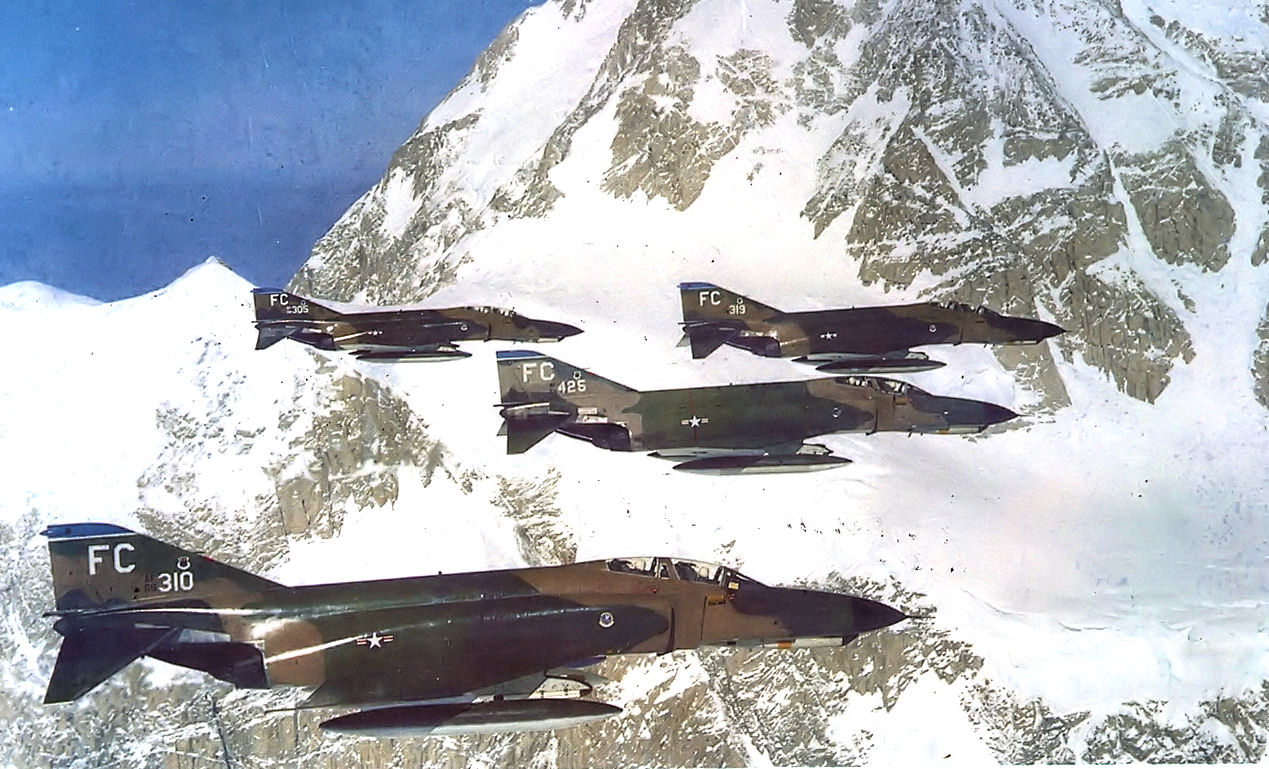
McDonnell Douglas F-4E Phantom IIs 21st TFW 18 TFS. Serial numbers: 68-310 68-425 68-305 68-319, about 1975

This mixture of jet and propeller-driven aircraft, along with helicopters and utility aircraft represented a conglomeration of AAC's aircraft and was supported by four different maintenance squadrons.

Budget reductions under the Nixon administration in 1969 meant that the assigned strength dropped to 9,987; the Aleutian DEW Line segment was dismantled; Fire Island, Unalakeet and Northeast Cape AFS were closed and the squadrons inactivated. The 317th FIS was also inactivated on 31 December 1969, with the permanently stationed F-102s being sent to the Air National Guard at CONUS bases, leaving AAC without any permanently assigned interceptor squadrons, however ADC rotational F-106 deployments continued.

Despite a diminished number of personnel and aircraft, the arrival of the 43d Tactical Fighter Squadron in June 1970, from MacDill AFB, Florida with McDonnell Douglas F-4E Phantoms. The squadron gave AAC an air-to-ground capability that was further enhanced with the activation of the 18th Tactical Fighter Squadron at Elmendorf, also with F-4Es. The arrival of the versatile F-4E marked another turning point in AAC's history. It gave AAC a tactical air-to-ground attack capability. Consequently, the rotational ADC F-106 deployments from the lower continental states ceased soon after the 43d assumed mission responsibilities at Elmendorf, Eielson, Galena and King Salmon on 1 August.

The winter of 1970–1971 was severe in Alaska, causing numerous mechanical failures in the F-4s which had been accustomed to Florida's warm climate. At times, the wing's operational air defense assets dwindled from eighteen aircraft to only one or two. Moreover, the 43d assumed close air support as well as air defense responsibilities, two missions which stretched the squadron's capabilities. In response, Air Staff sent the 43d an additional six aircraft in May 1971.

In 1975 and 1977, organizational changes took place. Due to a realignment of airlift and rescue forces under the Military Airlift Command (MAC), the wing divested its helicopters and C-130s in 1975. Overall, however, the wing expanded, gaining two air base squadrons and several other responsibilities. The 21 CW picked up a new fighter unit on 1 October 1977 when the 18th Tactical Fighter Squadron (F-4Es) activated. Subsequently, the 43d maintained its air defense mission while the 18th adopted the role of close air support. Both units shared air defense alert duties in Alaska. Additionally, from November 1977 to April 1979, the 21st CW controlled all thirteen of Alaska's air control and warning sites

==== 1980s modernization ====
The 1980s were a period of growth and modernization. The Command's command, control, communications and surveillance system underwent a modernization during the late 1970s and early 1980s. The labor-intensive, 1950s era Aircraft Control and Warning radar stations were replaced with minimally attended AN/FPS-117 long range radars, and the stations were closed in 1983; being reduced to unmanned sites supported by contract civilian personnel. The White Alice Communications network was inactivated in 1979, being replaced by an Alascom owned and operated satellite earth terminal as part of an Air Force plan to divest itself of the obsolete radio system and transfer the responsibility to a commercial firm. Also, the semi-automated Alaskan NORAD Control Center was replaced with the fully automated Alaska NORAD Region Regional Operations Control Center (ROCC). It achieved an operational capability on 14 June 1983, linked to the Alaska Radar System which achieved its operational capability in October 1985.

At Elmendorf, the 21st Tactical Fighter Wing converted from F-4s to F-15A Eagles in 1982; the Eagles were upgraded to the more capable F-15C during 1986–1987. The 18th Tactical Fighter Squadron was assigned to Eielson Air Force Base where it was equipped with A-10 Thunderbolt II close air-ground support aircraft. The 54th Tactical Fighter Squadron, of Aleutian Campaign fame, activated once again in 1987

On 1 July 1986, the 962d Airborne Early Warning and Control Squadron (AWACS) activated at Elmendorf AFB. It operated two E-3 Sentry aircraft on rotational duty to Alaska. (The aircraft were later assigned to the squadron.) A second F-15C squadron was added the next year. The modern radar system, F-15s and the E-3 resulted in a greater capability to protect the air sovereignty of North America.

The number of Soviet aircraft intercepts increased dramatically from an average of ten a year during the first half of the 1980s to a record of 31 in 1987, after which the numbers began to decline dramatically following the breakup of the Soviet Union, and today such intercepts are rare occurrences. The air sovereignty role while still important, has diminished in utility to that of the "Polar Thrust" whereby Alaskan aircraft deploy anywhere in the globe on short notice to deliver whatever ordnance or capability is required.

AAC hosted multiple distinguished visitors. In 1989 President George Bush stopped at Elmendorf en route to Japan for the state funeral of Japanese Emperor Hirohito and addressed a crowd of over 7,000 in Hangar Five. Ironically, this was the same hangar in which President Richard Nixon had greeted Hirohito eighteen years previously when the emperor had made his first official state visit outside his native land.

==== Inactivation ====
Joint operations in Alaska are a practical necessity. After the Alaskan Command (ALCOM), a unified command established in 1947, was disestablished in 1975, the Commander, AAC assumed the additional responsibility of Commander, Joint Task Force-Alaska, a provisional joint command that could be activated in the event of an emergency, such as the Exxon Valdez oil spill in March 1989. Emergency activation did not provide the daily resources needed by the vast Alaska mission, however, and Alaskan Command activated again shortly after the spill on 7 July 1989, as a subordinate unified command under the United States Pacific Command in recognition of Alaska's strategic importance to the defense of the Pacific.

With the reactivation of the Alaskan Command, the next logical step was to place its air component (AAC) under the Pacific Air Forces (PACAF). By reorganizing from AAC to a Numbered Air Force, the Air Force was able to reduce its administrative manpower requirements during a period of massive reorganization and downsizing throughout the Air Force.

On 9 August 1990, the Alaskan Air Command was redesignated as the Eleventh Air Force once again.

== Lineage ==
- Eleventh Air Force was redesignated Alaskan Air Command and assumed major command status, on 18 December 1945.

Redesignated Eleventh Air Force on 9 August 1990 and, concurrently, status changed from a major command of the United States Air Force to a subordinate organization of Pacific Air Forces.

== Stations ==
- Davis Army Airfield, Adak, Alaska Territory, 18 December 1945
- Elmendorf Field, (later Air Force Base), Alaska Territory (later Alaska), 1 October 1946 – 9 August 1990

== Components ==
=== Divisions ===
- 10th Air Division

Provided for the air defense of Alaska south of the Alaska Range on 1 November 1950. Subordinate units flew numerous interception and training missions. Between June 1957 and March 1960, the division operated and maintained Elmendorf AFB, Alaska, plus several smaller installations. It was replaced by the 5070th Air Defense Wing (for air defense), and the 5040th Air Base Wing (for base operations) in August 1960.

- 11th Air Division

Provided for the air defense of northern Alaska and supervised base operations at major and minor installations in that area. It furnished detachments at Ice Station Alpha, Drift Station Charlie (November 1957 – August 1960), and Drift Station Bravo (T-3) (July 1959 – August 1960), in the Arctic Ocean.

=== Interceptor units ===
- Elemendorf Air Force Base

57th Fighter-Interceptor Wing, 20 April 1948 – 1 January 1951
5039th Air Base Wing (Host unit), 13 April 1953

Re-designated: 5040th Air Base Wing, 1 June 1957 – 8 July 1966

21st Composite Wing, 8 July 1966

Re-designated 21st Tactical Fighter Wing, 1 October 1979 – 9 August 1990

18th Tactical Fighter Squadron, 1 October 1977

Transferred to Eielson AFB, 1 January 1992 – 9 August 1990

31st Fighter-Interceptor Squadron, 20 August 1957 – 8 October 1958
43d Tactical Fighter Squadron, 1 June 1970 – 9 August 1990
64th Fighter-Interceptor Squadron, 23 June 1947 – 1 November 1957
65th Fighter-Interceptor Squadron, 23 June 1947 – 1 November 1957
66th Fighter-Interceptor Squadron, 30 May 1947 – 1 December 1957
317th Fighter Interceptor Squadron, 15 August 1957 – 31 December 1969

- Ladd Air Force Base

5001st Composite Wing (Host unit), 19 June 1948 – 1 October 1961

18th Fighter-Interceptor Squadron, 28 August 1954 – 20 August 1957
433d Fighter-Interceptor Squadron, 16 July 1954 – 1 November 1957
449th Fighter Interceptor Squadron, 28 March 1949 – 25 August 1960
720th Fighter-Bomber Squadron, 25 December 1953

Transferred to Eielson AFB, 17 May 1954 – 8 August 1955

=== Support units ===
- Elmendorf Air Force Base

17th Troop Carrier Squadron, 17 June 1964 – 9 August 1990
54th Troop Carrier Squadron, 20 September 1949 – 23 July 1956
531st Aircraft Control and Warning Group, 17 November 1950 – 13 April 1953

Re-designated: 11th Tactical Control Group, 15 November 1977 – 9 August 1990

1727th Air Support Squadron (MATS), 21 July 1950

Re-designated: 602d Military Airlift Support Squadron (MAC), 8 January 1966
Re-designated: 616th Military Airlift Group (MAC), 1 November 1975 – 9 August 1990

5039th Air Transport Group, 1 January 1951

Re-designated: 5040th Air Transport Squadron, 1 August 1960
Re-designated: 5017th Operations Squadron, 1 July 1963 – 8 July 1966
Replaced by: 21st Operations Squadron, 8 July 1966 – 1 January 1970

5039th Aircraft Control and Warning Group, 1 June 1957 – 1 November 1959

Re-designated: 5040th Aircraft Control and Warning Group, 1 November 1959 – 1 August 1960

5040th Helicopter Squadron, 15 July 1969 – 30 September 1975
5070th Air Defense Wing, 1 August 1950 – 1 October 1961
25th Tactical Air Support Squadron (Eielson AFB), 8 July 1971 – 30 September 1989

Det 1, 55th Weather Reconnaissance Squadron (Eielson AFB, AWS), 1 July 1960 – 30 June 1968
58th Weather Reconnaissance Squadron (Eielson AFB, AWS), 21 February 1951 – 8 August 1958
5001st Operations Squadron (Ladd AFB), 1 September 1954

Re-designated: 5060th Operations Squadron, 1 November 1957 – 30 April 1960

5071st Air Base (later Combat Support) Squadron (King Salmon Airport), 1 July 1960 – 9 August 1990
5072d Air Base (later Combat Support) Squadron (Galena Airport), 1 January 1958 – 9 August 1990

=== Tenant Strategic Air Command units ===
- Eielson Air Force Base

97th Bombardment Group, 1 December 1947 – 12 March 1948
5010th Air Base Wing (AAC base host unit), 20 April 1948 – 1 August 1960
4157th Strategic Wing, 1 July 1960

Re-designated: 6th Strategic Wing, 25 March 1967 – 9 August 1990

- Elmendorf Air Force Base

22d Air Refueling Squadron, 3 January 1956 – 2 March 1956
4158th Strategic Wing, 1 July 1960 – 25 June 1966

- Ladd Army Airfield (later AFB)

46th/72d Reconnaissance Squadron, 13 August 1947 – 28 June 1949
375th Reconnaissance Squadron, 15 October 1947

Transferred to: Shemya AFB, 13 October 1947 – 15 May 1949
Transferred to: Eielson AFB, 6 March 1949 – 21 February 1947

=== Operational Bases ===
All transferred to Eleventh Air Force, 9 August 1990

- Elmendorf Air Force Base, 61°15′05″N 149°48′23″W
- Eielson Air Force Base, 64°39′56″N 147°06′05″W
- Shemya Air Force Base, 52°42′44″N 174°06′49″E
- Galena Airport, 64°44′10″N 156°56′15″W

Former Galena Army Airfield (AFB), Closed 1948; Operated as Forward Operating Base for air defense interceptors

- King Salmon Airport, 58°40′36″N 156°38′57″W

Former Naknek Army Airfield (AFB), Closed 1948; Operated as Forward Operating Base for air defense interceptors

- Kulis Air National Guard Base, 61°09′47″N 149°58′19″W

Co-located at Ted Stevens International Airport, Anchorage

=== Inactive Bases ===
- Amchitka Air Force Base, 51°22′37″N 179°15′32″E

Transferred to Strategic Air Command, July 1947
Closed 1950; now abandoned.

- Big Delta Air Force Base, 63°59′42″N 145°43′12″W

Transferred to Strategic Air Command, July 1947
Closed 1948; Transferred to United States Army, now Fort Greely

- Cape Air Force Base, 53°22′29″N 167°53′51″W

Former Fort Glenn Army Airfield, Closed December 1950.

- Davis Air Force Base, 51°52′41″N 176°38′46″W

Closed 1950; Transferred to United States Navy as Naval Air Station Adak

- Ladd Air Force Base, 64°50′15″N 147°36′52″W

Closed 1961; Transferred to United States Army, now Fort Wainwright

- Marks Air Force Base, 64°30′44″N 165°26′43″W

Former Marks Army Airfield (AFB), Closed 1950; Operated as Forward Operating Base for air defense interceptors until 1956; now Nome Airport

- Nenana Air Force Base, 64°32′50″N 149°04′26″W

Construction begun 1948 for Strategic Air Command, abandoned due to unsuitability of site. Later Clear AF Auxiliary Field. Clear AFS is on part of the site; Now Nenana Municipal Airport

- Point Spencer Air Force Base, 65°15′41″N 166°51′23″W

Closed 1948; now Port Clarence Coast Guard Station

- Thornbrough Air Force Base, 55°12′22″N 162°43′32″W

Former Fort Randall Army Airfield, Closed 1953; now Cold Bay Airport

- Walseth Air Force Base, 60°07′36″N 149°25′07″W

Was: Seward Naval Air Auxiliary Field; Transferred to AAC 1945; Closed 1948; now Seward Airport

=== Aircraft Control and Warning (AC&W) radar stations ===
In 1950 contracts were awarded for the construction of interior ground control and intercept radar sites and work was started shortly afterwards on the Aircraft Control and Warning (AC&W) system.

Site ID	LRRS ID	Name	Location	Squadron/Unit	Air Div	Activated	Inactivated
F-01		Fire Island AFS	61°08′28″N 150°13′05″W	626th Aircraft Control and Warning Squadron	10th AD	1951	1969
F-02	A-02	Murphy Dome AFS	64°57′07″N 148°21′26″W	744th Aircraft Control and Warning Squadron	11th AD	1951	1983
F-03; C-01	A-07	King Salmon AFS	58°41′33″N 156°40′11″W	705th Aircraft Control and Warning Squadron	10th AD	1951	1983
F-04	A-11	Tin City AFS	65°34′33″N 168°00′43″W	710th Aircraft Control and Warning Squadron	11th AD	1953	1983
F-05	A-09	Cape Newenham AFS	58°37′36″N 162°04′34″W	794th Aircraft Control and Warning Squadron	10th AD	1954	1983
F-06	A-10	Cape Romanzof AFS	61°47′23″N 165°57′43″W	795th Aircraft Control and Warning Squadron	10th AD	1953	1983
F-07	A-13	Cape Lisburne AFS	68°52′12″N 166°09′00″W	711th Aircraft Control and Warning Squadron	11th AD	1953	1983
F-08	A-04	Campion AFS	64°42′21″N 156°43′41″W	743d Aircraft Control and Warning Squadron	11th AD	1952	1983
F-09		Northeast Cape AFS	63°17′25″N 168°58′19″W	712th Aircraft Control and Warning Squadron	10th AD	1953	1969
F-10; C-02	A-05	Tatalina AFS	62°55′45″N 156°00′51″W	717th Aircraft Control and Warning Squadron	10th AD	1952	1983
F-14	A-01	Fort Yukon AFS	66°33′39″N 145°12′34″W	709th Aircraft Control and Warning Squadron	11th AD	1958	1983
F-15	A-06	Sparrevohn AFS	61°07′09″N 155°35′47″W	719th Aircraft Control and Warning Squadron	10th AD	1954	1983
F-16	A-03	Indian Mountain AFS	66°04′08″N 153°41′10″W	708th Aircraft Control and Warning Squadron	11th AD	1953	1983
F-20		Unalakleet AFS	63°55′04″N 160°45′04″W	718th Aircraft Control and Warning Squadron	10th AD	1958	1969
F-21; C-03		Bethel AFS	60°47′07″N 161°52′58″W	713th Aircraft Control and Warning Squadron	10th AD	1958	1963
F-22		Middleton Island AFS	59°27′12″N 146°19′07″W	720th Aircraft Control and Warning Squadron	10th AD	1958	1963
F-24	A-12	Kotzebue AFS	66°50′35″N 162°35′42″W	748th Aircraft Control and Warning Squadron	11th AD	1958	1983
F-25		Ohlson Mountain AFS	59°42′50″N 151°32′05″W	937th Aircraft Control and Warning Squadron	10th AD	1958	1963
F-26	A-08	Cold Bay AFS	55°15′49″N 162°53′08″W	714th Aircraft Control and Warning Squadron	10th AD	1959	1983
C-04		Willow Airport	61°45′15″N 150°03′06″W	Det C-4, 626th Aircraft Control and Warning Squadron	10th AD	1951	1952

- Bethel, Middleton Island, and Ohlson Mountain AFS were closed on 15 May 1963 due to budget reductions.
- Unalakleet, Northeast Cape, and Fire Island AFS closed 30 September 1969 due to budget reductions.

=== Long Range Radar (LRR) Sites ===
By the 1970s, the AC&W system had become expensive to maintain and was obsolete. In 1974 the Air Staff released its Saber Yukon study, which recommended that the system be modernized. As a result, AAC was included in the Electronic Systems Division-managed program to replace the SAGE system with a joint USAF-FAA use Region Operations Control Center/Joint Surveillance System (ROCC/JSS). The command also initiated another program to replace the site radars with minimally attended radars. The Alaskan-unique Seek Igloo program, as it became known, was also managed by the Electronic Systems Division.

Construction of the Alaskan NORAD Regional Operations Control Center (ROCC), or "Top ROCC," was begun in 1980 at Elmendorf AFB. It achieved initial operational capability on 14 June 1983, and fully operational capability on 15 September 1983. Data from the Ground Control Intercept sites was remoted back to the ROCC from the 13 sites, the large number of personnel at the Radar sites were no longer needed. All military personnel were phased out by September 1983. The 13 AC&W squadrons were inactivated 1 November 1983. The AC&W sites were redesignated long range radar sites, and a small number of contract civilian personnel remained at the sites to provide maintenance.

LRRS ID	Name	Location	Activated	Inactivated	Notes
A-14	Kenai (FAA Joint-Use)	60°36′55″N 151°16′59″W	1980	Active	Replaced former USAF radar site on Fire Island; See also: Kenai Municipal Airport (PAEN)
A-15	Point Lay	69°44′26″N 163°00′28″W	1957	1994	Originally was DEW-Line radar site LIZ-2; NWS/LRR Site established 1989; See also: Point Lay LRRS Airport (PPIZ)
A-16	Wainwright	70°36′37″N 159°59′12″W	1957	2007	Originally DEW-Line radar site LIZ-3; NWS/LRR Site Established 1994; Closed 2007 due to soil erosion & budget concerns See also: Wainwright Airport (PAWI)
A-17	Point Barrow	71°19′38″N 156°38′10″W	1989	Active	Originally was DEW-Line radar site POW-MAIN; NWS/LRR Site Established 1989; See Point Barrow Long Range Radar Site
A-18	Point Lonely	70°54′37″N 153°14′23″W	1957	2007	Originally was DEW-Line site POW-1; NWS/SRR Site Established 1994; Closed 2007 due to soil erosion & budget concerns See also: Lonely Air Station (PALN)
A-19	Oliktok	70°29′54″N 149°53′22″W	1957	Active	Originally DEW-Line radar site POW-2; NWS/LRR Site Established 1989. See: Oliktok Long Range Radar Site
A-20	Bullen Point	70°10′34″N 146°51′19″W	1957	2007	Site was formerly known as Flaxman Island, DEW-Line Site POW-3; NWS/LRR Site Established 1994; Closed 2007 due to soil erosion & budget concerns See: Bullen Point Short Range Radar Site
A-21	Barter Island	70°07′49″N 143°38′21″W	1953	Active	The first DEW-Line radar station (BAR-MAIN) to become operational; NWS/LRR Site Established 1990; See also: Barter Island LRRS Airport (PABA)

=== Distant Early Warning Line (DEW) Stations ===
The Distant Early Warning Line was a Cold War system of radar stations in the Arctic region of Canada, with stations in Alaska and the Aleutian Islands. It was designed to detect incoming "Over the Pole" Soviet aircraft, and provide early warning for a land based invasion.

Alaskan Air Command operated 40 main stations with an additional 15 gap filler sites along Alaskan north coast from the Canada–US border westward along the Aleutian Islands. The DEW Line remained in operation for about 30 years, being replaced by the North Warning System (NWS) when selected DEW Line stations were upgraded and merged with newly built stations into a more advanced early warning system. Automation was increased over the previous DEW Line system and a number of additional DEW Line stations were closed. In 1990, with the end of the Cold War and dissolution of the Soviet Union the system in Alaska came under the control of the Alaskan NORAD Regional Operations Control Center (ROCC) at Elmendorf AFB.

Site ID	Segment	Name	Location	Activated	Inactivated	Notes
COB-MAIN; F-26; A-08	Aleutians	Cold Bay AFS	55°15′49″N 162°53′08″W	1969	1969	714th Aircraft Control and Warning Squadron
COB-1	Aleutians	Nikolski	52°58′16″N 168°51′15″W	1959	1959	Det 1 714th Aircraft Control and Warning Squadron; site remediated and obliterated 1998 by 11th AF.
COB-2	Aleutians	Dirftwood Bay	53°58′28″N 166°54′18″W	1959	1969	Det 1 714th Aircraft Control and Warning Squadron; building foundation remains.
COB-3	Aleutians	Cape Sarichef	54°35′32″N 164°52′34″W	1959	1969	Det 3 714th Aircraft Control and Warning Squadron
COB-4	Aleutians	Port Moller	55°58′41″N 160°30′01″W	1959	1969	Det 4 714th Aircraft Control and Warning Squadron
COB-5	Aleutians	Port Heiden	56°58′38″N 158°39′09″W	1959	1969	Det 5 714th Aircraft Control and Warning Squadron
LIZ-1; F-07; A-13	Lisburne	Cape Lisburne AFS	68°52′12″N 166°09′00″W	1953	Active	711th Aircraft Control and Warning Squadron
LIZ-2; A-15	Lisburne	Point Lay	69°44′26″N 163°00′27″W	1957	1994	Part of the North Warning System (NWS), 1989
LIZ-3; A-16	Lisburne	Wainwright	70°36′37″N 159°52′12″W	1953	2007	DEW operations ended 1995; Part of the North Warning System (NWS), 1994
LIZ-A	Lisburne	Cape Sabine	69°01′27″N 163°51′25″W	1957	1963	DEW Intermediate Site; abandoned
LIZ-B	Lisburne	Icy Cape	70°17′23″N 161°54′40″W	1957	1963	DEW Intermediate Site; abandoned; site remediated and obliterated 1998 by 11th AF.
LIZ-C	Lisburne	Peard Bay	70°48′29″N 158°15′32″W	1957	1963	DEW Intermediate Site; abandoned
POW-Main; A-17	Barrow	Point Barrow LRRS	71°19′38″N 156°38′10″W	1957	Active	Part of the North Warning System (NWS), 1989
POW-1; A-18	Barrow	Lonely	70°54′37″N 153°14′23″W	1957	2007	DEW operations ended 1990; Part of the North Warning System (NWS), 1994
POW-2; A-19	Barrow	Oliktok	70°29′54″N 149°53′22″W	1957	Active	Part of the North Warning System (NWS), 1990
POW-3; A-20	Barrow	Flaxman Island	70°10′34″N 146°51′19″W	1957	2007	Also known as Bullen Point SRRS (A-20) DEW operations ended 1995; Part of the North Warning System (NWS), 1994
POW-A	Barrow	Cape Simpson	71°03′26″N 154°43′39″W	1957	1963	DEW Intermediate Site; now in-use as civilian storage/supply facility
POW-B	Barrow	Kogru	70°34′36″N 152°15′56″W	1957	1963	DEW Intermediate Site; abandoned
POW-C	Barrow	McIntyre	70°24′10″N 148°40′46″W	1957	1963	DEW Intermediate Site; abandoned; 6.7 miles north of Prudhoe Bay oilfield
POW-D	Barrow	Brownlow Point	69°58′29″N 144°50′09″W	1957	1963	DEW Intermediate Site; abandoned
BAR-Main; A-21	Barter	Barter Island LRRS	70°07′49″N 143°38′21″W	1953	Active	Part of the North Warning System (NWS), 1990
BAR-A	Barter	Demarcation Bay	69°53′11″N 142°18′43″W	1957	1963	DEW Intermediate Site; abandoned; 35.8 mi west-northwest of Canada Yukon border. Most remote DEW site in Alaska.

== See also ==
- Alaska World War II Army Airfields
- Eleventh Air Force
- Pacific Air Forces
- Strategic Air Command
- United States general surveillance radar stations
