= 5010th Combat Support Group =

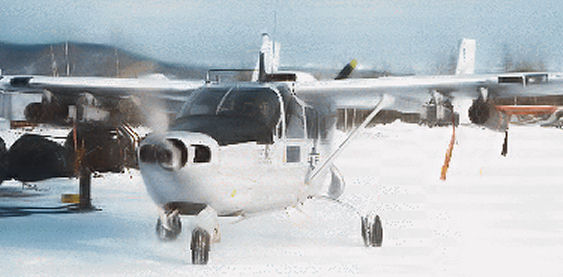
- O-2A at Eielson AFB
- Active: 1948–1981
- Country: United States
- Branch: United States Air Force
- Role: Air base support
- Part of: Alaskan Air Command

Insignia
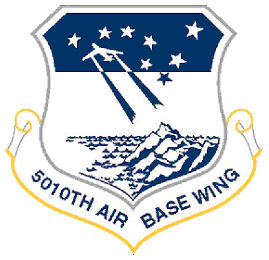
- 5010th Air Base Wing emblem

With the departure of the 97th Bombardment Wing, the Eielson Air Force Base Wing (Base Complement) was formed on 1 April 1948. On 20 April 1948, it was designated the 5010th Air Base Wing, and would be the host unit at the base until 1964.

The wing provided support to reconnaissance squadrons of Air Weather Service from 1949 through 1958. The wing also hosted Strategic Air Command units on temporary deployment to Eielson, playing host to Boeing B-29 Superfortresses, Convair B-36 Peacemakers and finally B-47s. In fact, the largest hangar on Eielson today, now used for Exercise Cope Thunder, was originally built to house two B-36 bombers, the largest bomber ever in Air Force inventory.

Construction boomed at Eielson AFB during the wing's tenure in the 1950s. Many of the facilities still in use today were built at that time – Amber Hall, the Thunderdome, Base Exchange, Commissary, Gymnasium, Theater, Base Chapel, some of the schools and many of the dormitories, just to name a few.

The quick response of the 5010th Combat Support Group to the Chena River flood (12–21 August 1967), and the subsequent help provided to Fairbanks and other communities led to the 5010th’s third Air Force Outstanding Unit Award. The AFOUA was awarded on 17 November 1967.

On 1 October 1981, the 343rd Wing, as the 343d Composite Wing, replaced the 5010th Combat Support Group absorbing its personnel and equipment, as Eielson's host unit.

== Lineage ==
- Designated Eielson AFB Wing and organized on 20 April 1948

Redesignated Eielson Bombardment Wing in 1948
Redesignated 5010th Wing c. 20 September 1948
Redesignated 5010th Composite Wing on 4 June 1949
Redesignated 5010th Air Base Wing c. 8 October 1954
Redesignated 5010th Combat Support Group on 1 January 1965
Discontinued on 1 October 1981

=== Assignment ===
- Alaskan Air Command 20 April 1948 – 1 October 1981

=== Components ===
Groups

- Airdrome Group, Eielson AFB Wing (later Airdrome Gp, Eielson Bombardment Wing, 5010th Air Base Group), 20 April 1948 – 1 January 1964
- Station Medical Group, Eielson AFB Wing (later Station Medical Group, Eielson Bombardment Wing, 5010th Station Medical Group, 5010th Medical Group, 5010th Medical Squadron, 5010th Medical Group, 5010th Medical Squadron, 5010th USAF Infirmary, 5010th USAF Hospital, 20 April 1948 – 1 February 1971
- 5010th Civil Engineering Group, 1 July 1960 – 1 January 1964
- 5010th Maintenance & Supply Group, 1 January 1951 – 1 February 1953
- 5010th Maintenance & Supply Group, 1 July 1960 – 1 January 1964

Squadrons

- Holding Squadron, Provisional, 5010th Air Base Wing, 20 September 1957 – 15 January 1958
- 25th Tactical Air Support Squadron, 8 July 1971 – 1 October 1981
- 5010th Air Police Squadron (later 5010th Security Police Squadron), 1 January 1964 – 1 October 1981
- 5010th Consolidated Aircraft Maintenance Squadron, 1 January 1964 – 1 October 1981
- 5010th Field Maintenance Squadron, 1 February 1953 – 1 August 1960
- 5010th Maintenance & Supply Squadron, 1 January 1950 – 1 January 1951
- 5010th Medical Squadron (see Station Medical Group, Eielson AFB Wing)
- 5010th Services Squadron, 1 January 1964 – 28 February 1977
- 5010th Supply Squadron, 1 February 1953 – 1 August 1960
- 5010th Supply Squadron, 1 January 1964 – 1 October 1981
- 5010th Transportation Squadron, 1 January 1964 – 1 October 1981

Other

- USAF Hospital, Eielson (later USAF Clinic, Eielson), 1 February 1971 – 1 October 1981
- 5010th USAF Hospital (see Station Medical Group, Eielson AFB Wing)
- 5010th USAF Infirmary (see Station Medical Group, Eielson AFB Wing)
