= Campion Air Force Station =

Closed US Air Force General Surveillance Radar station in Alaska

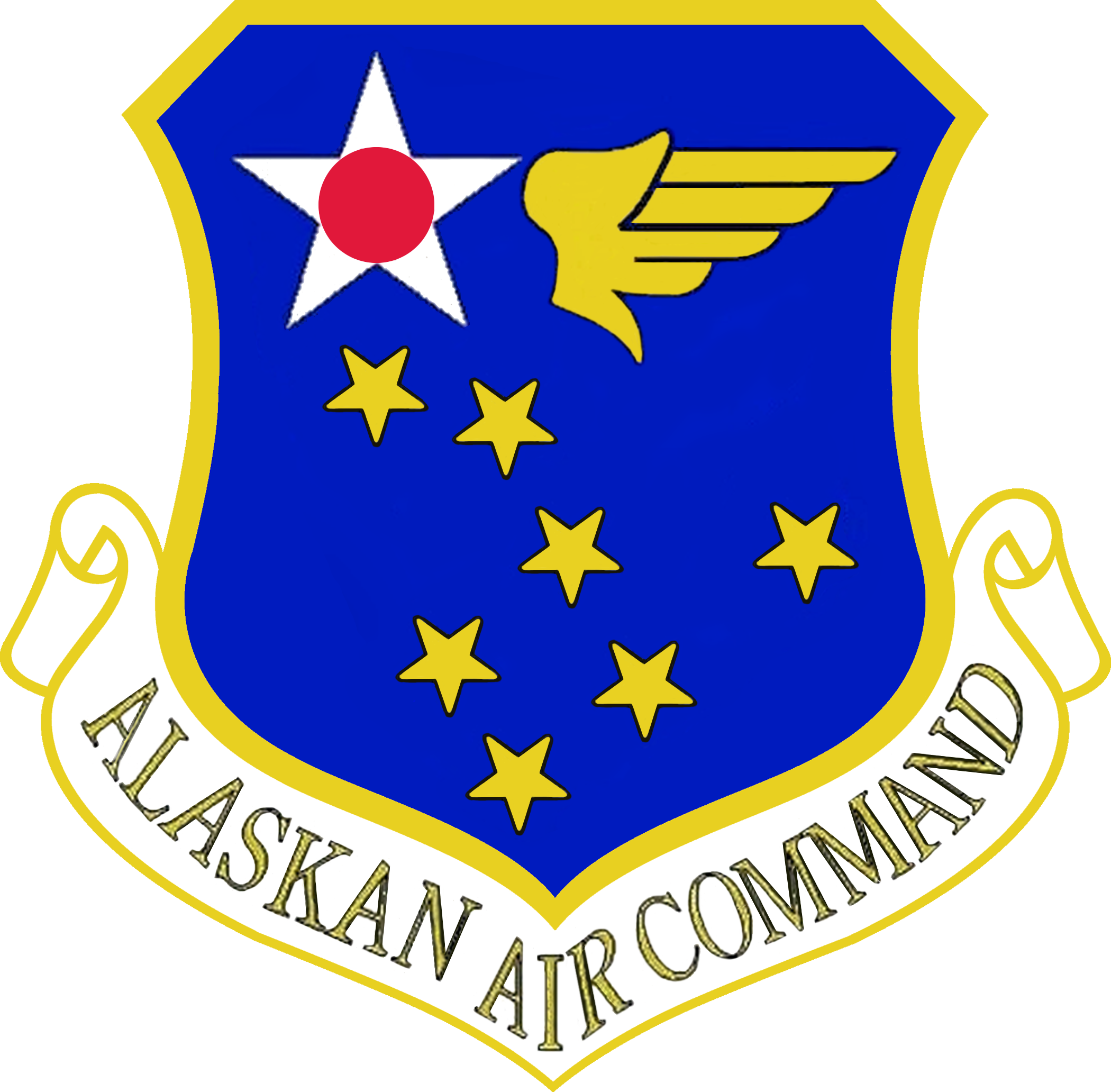
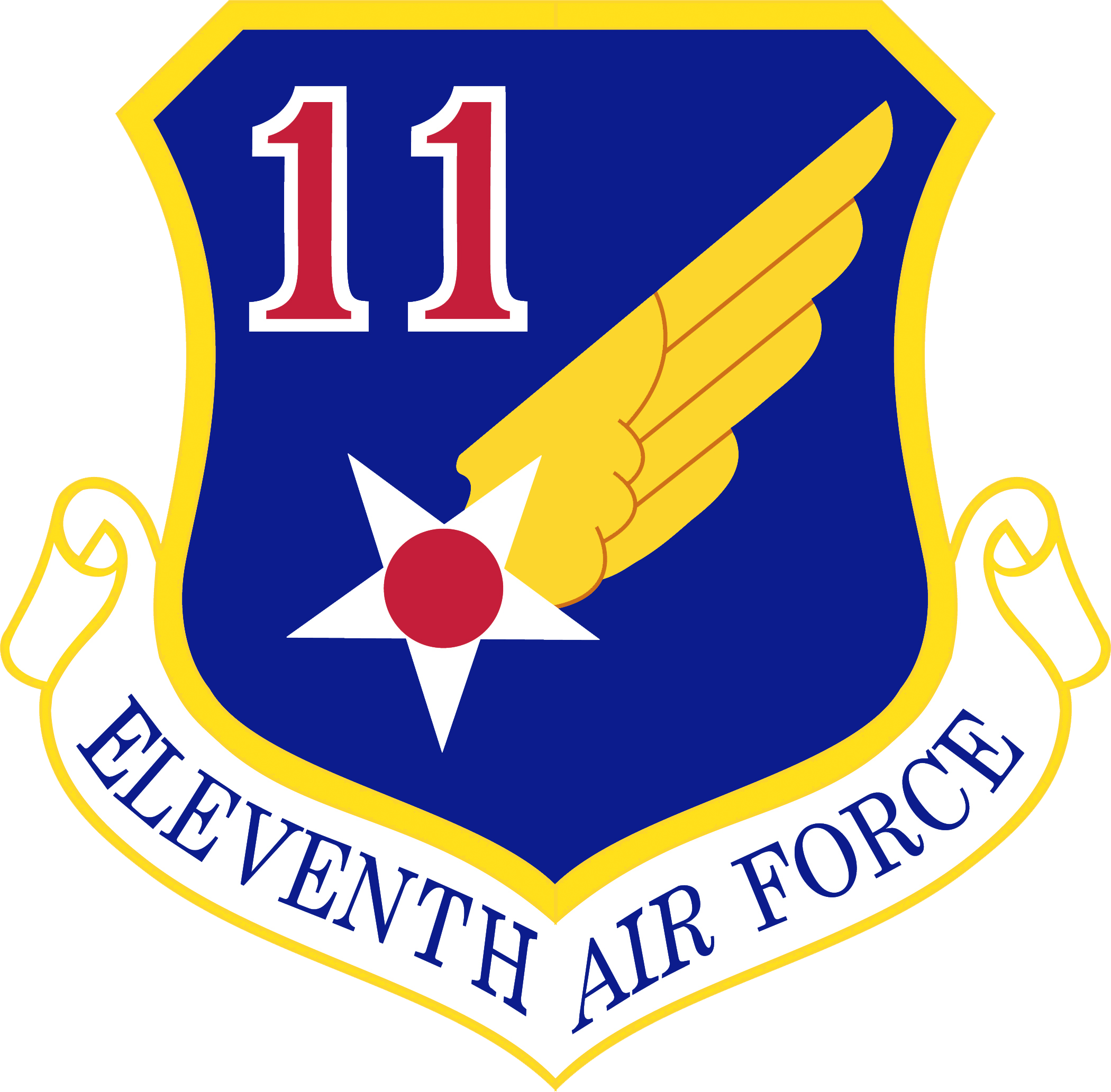
Campion Air Force Station Galena Long Range Radar Station
- Part of Eleventh Air Force (PACAF)
- Campion Air Force Station
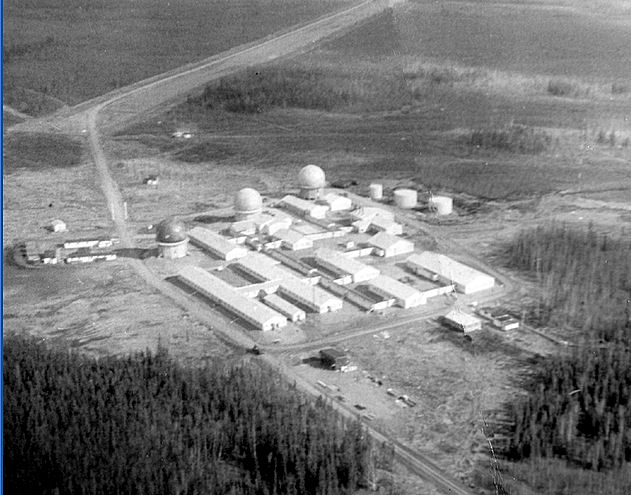

Site information
- Type: Air Force Station
- Controlled by: United States Air Force

Location
- Location of Campion AFS, Alaska
- Coordinates: 64°42′21″N 156°43′41″W

Site history
- Built: 1951
- In use: 1951-1983

Garrison information
- Garrison: 743d Aircraft Control and Warning Squadron (1952–1983)

Campion Air Force Station (AAC ID: F-08) is a closed United States Air Force General Surveillance Radar station. It is located 6.4 miles (10.3 km) east-southeast of Galena, Alaska.

The Aircraft Control and Warning station was closed on 1 November 1983, and the site was re-designated as a Long Range Radar (LRR) Station. It remains active as part of the Alaska NORAD Region.

== History ==
Campion Air Force Station (AFS) was a continental defense radar station constructed to provide the United States Air Force early warning of an attack by the Soviet Union on Alaska. It was one of the ten original aircraft control and warning sites constructed during the early 1950s to establish a permanent air defense system in Alaska. The station was named in honor of Lieutenant Alan J. Campion, 449th Fighter Interceptor Squadron, Ladd AFB, who was killed on 26 November 1950 when the Lockheed F-94 Starfire interceptor he was flying crashed while attempting to land at nearby Galena AFB, Alaska.

Construction of the station, began in September 1950 and was completed in April 1952. The Army Transportation Corps undertook the project. The station site was located on the Yukon River, and equipment and construction material was floated by barge to a dock built on the river 64°41′11″N 156°44′45″W. Initially, there were no roads, which had to be built as part of the construction effort. Each item had to be hauled up from dock/storage area along the river, then along the newly constructed road to the permanent station site.

The station site and radars were located behind some small hills on the west side of the river. The station consisted of a power/heating plant, water and fuel storage tanks, gymnasium and other support office buildings. Two other buildings contained living quarters, work areas, and recreational facilities plus opportunities for such sports as skiing, skating, horseshoes, and basketball. The station buildings were, except for the civil engineering building connected by heated hallways. As a result, personnel stationed there, with only very few exceptions, were able to wear "summer" uniforms year round, unless they had a need to go outside during the winter season. However, if you dared go outside in the summer with summer uniform be prepared to be eaten alive by mosquitoes. They could bite right through your fatigue jacket and shirt and under shirt. The coverings of the station's three radar towers were heated from within to keep the covering from becoming brittle from extreme cold, and thus subject to being damaged or destroyed by high winds. After several years of 15 month tours and many psychologist studies it was finally decided to limit tours at the station to one year because of the psychological strain and physical hardships. A seven-mile-long dirt road connected the station to the town of Galena.

Just west of the station itself, a 4,500' gravel/dirt airstrip saw air traffic only on very rare occasions. The runway at Galena AFB supported most transport flights.

The 743d Aircraft Control and Warning Squadron, activated in April 1952 operated AN/TPS-1D, AN/FPS-3S, AN/FPS-6, AN/FPS-20, and AN/FPS-6B radars. Campion AFS was originally commissioned as an NCC (NORAD Control Center), but was re-fitted and downgraded to an NGCI (NORAD Ground Control Intercept) in 1974. Champion AFS operated as a Ground-Control Intercept (GCI) and warning station. As a GCI station, the squadron's role was to guide interceptor aircraft deployed to the forward operating base at Galena AFB toward unidentified intruders picked up on the unit's radar scopes. In March 1953, the Manual Air Defense Direction Center (MCC) at Murphy Dome AFS near Fairbanks exercised control over Champion's radars where the data was analyzed to determine range, direction altitude speed and whether or not aircraft were friendly or hostile.

Over the years, the equipment at the station was upgraded or modified to improve the efficiency and accuracy of the information gathered by the radars. In 1983, Campion AFS was closed when Galena Airport received a new AN/FPS-117 minimally attended radar 64°44′30″N 156°57′26″W. under Alaskan Air Command's SEEK IGLOO program . It was designed to transmit aircraft tracking data via satellite to the Alaskan NORAD Regional Operations Control Center (ROCC) at Elmendorf AFB. No longer needed, the 743d ACWS was inactivated on l November 1983 and the new radar at Galena designated as Galena Long Range Radar Site (A-05).

In 1990, jurisdiction of the Galena LRR Site was transferred to Eleventh Air Force with the redesignation of AAC. The Galena LRR Site was subsequently inactivated in March 1994.

In 1998 Pacific Air Forces initiated "Operation Clean Sweep", in which abandoned Cold War stations in Alaska were remediated and the land restored to its previous state. After years of neglect the facilities at former Campion Air Force Station had lost any value they had when the site was closed. The site remediation of the radar and support station was carried out by the 611th Civil Engineering Squadron at Elmendorf AFB, and remediation work was completed by 2005.

Today it is apparently being used as a landfill for the town of Galena.

== Demographics ==
Historical population
| Census | Pop. | Note | %± |
|---|---|---|---|
| 1980 | 62 | | — |
U.S. Decennial Census

Campion Station appeared once on the U.S. Census in 1980 as a census-designated place (CDP) before its closure in 1983.

== Air Force units and assignments ==
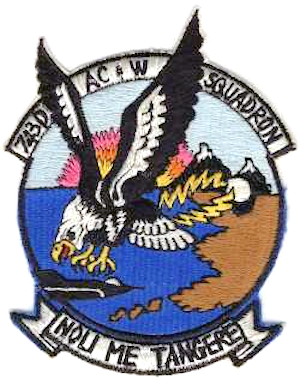
Emblem of the 743d Aircraft Control and Warning Squadron

Units:

- 743d Aircraft Control and Warning Squadron, 1952–1983
- OL AM, 5059th Air Postal Squadron

Assignments:

- 743rd ACWS

== Awards ==
- Presidential citation award in 1967

== See also ==
- Alaskan Air Command
