= Unalakleet Air Force Station =

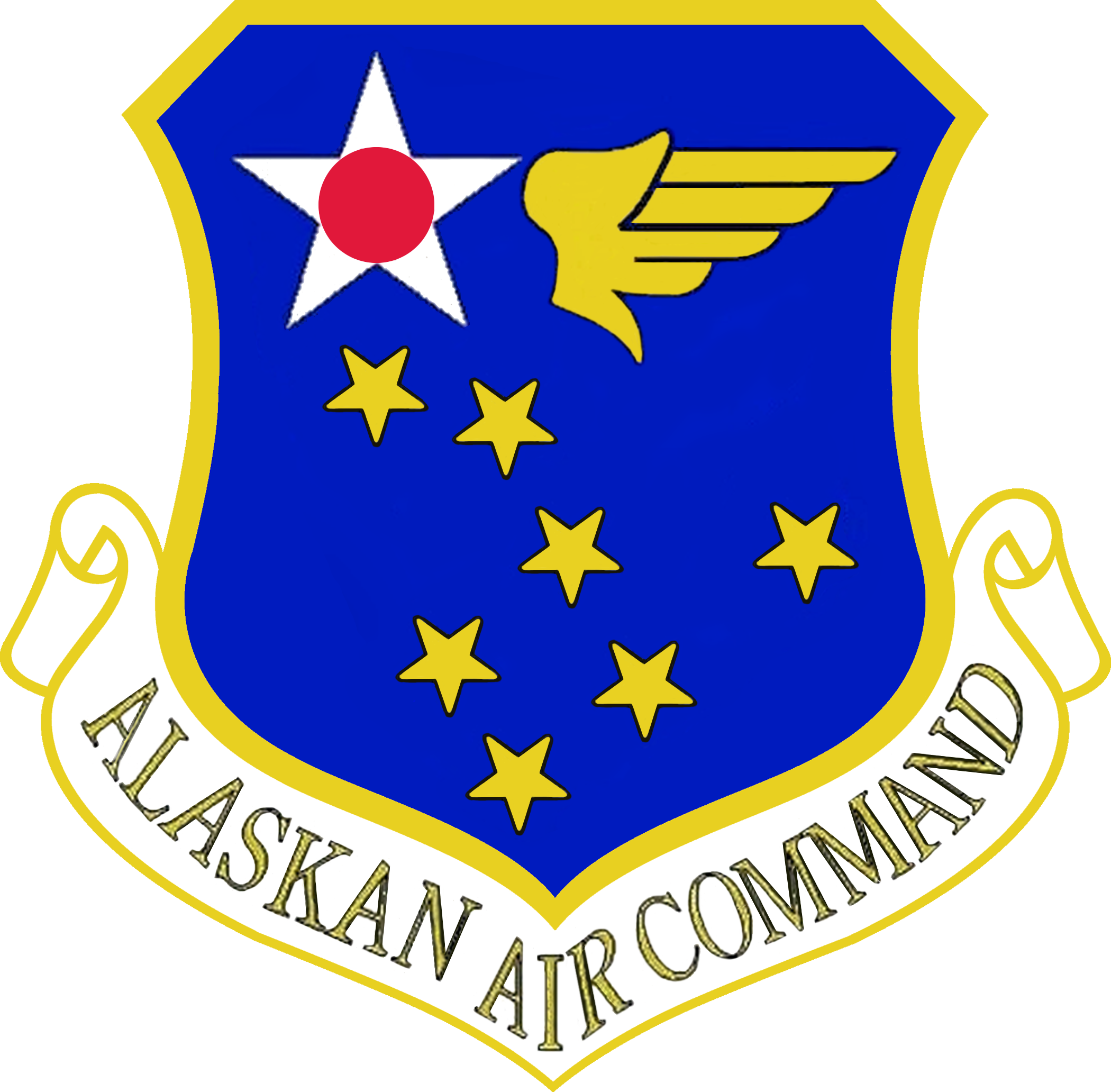
Unalakleet Air Force Station
- Part of Alaskan Air Command (AAC)

Site information
- Type: Air Force Station
- Controlled by: United States Air Force

Location
- Location of Unalakleet AFS, Alaska
- Coordinates: 63°55′04″N 160°45′04″W

Site history
- Built: 1953
- In use: 1958-1969

Garrison information
- Garrison: 718th Aircraft Control and Warning Squadron (1953-1969)

Unalakleet Air Force Station (AAC ID: F-20) is a closed United States Air Force General Surveillance Radar station. It was located 394 miles (634 km) west of Fairbanks, Alaska.

== History ==
Unalakleet AFS was a continental defence radar station constructed to provide the United States Air Force early warning of an attack by the Soviet Union on Alaska.

In 1957, 622 acres were acquired approximately 3 miles northeast of Unalakleet, Alaska for construction of the station. Using the existing port facilities at the settlement, Naval LST's and towed barges were able to land of construction equipment and material, which was transported along a gravel road to the construction site. The completed station consisted of about 25 buildings and miscellaneous support structures 63°55′07″N 160°46′20″W. on a hilly site to the west of the radar station, which was located on top of a hill at 900' elevation. The station buildings were, except for the civil engineering building connected by heated hallways. As a result, personnel stationed there, with only very few exceptions, were able to wear "summer" uniforms year round, unless they had a need to go outside during the winter season. The coverings of the station's three radar towers were heated from within to keep the covering from becoming brittle from extreme cold, and thus subject to being damaged or destroyed by high winds. Tours at the station were limited to one year because of the psychological strain and physical hardships.

The 718th Aircraft Control and Warning Squadron, activated in April 1958 and operated AN/FPS-8; AN/TPS-10D, AN/FPS-4; AN/FPS-20A, and AN/FPS-6 radars. As a surveillance station, its mission was to monitor the airspace for aircraft activity and provide information 24/7 to the air defense Direction Center at Murphy Dome AFS near Fairbanks, where it was analyzed to determine range, direction altitude speed and whether or not aircraft were friendly or hostile.

Communications were initially provided by a high frequency radio system which proved unreliable because of atmospheric disturbances. The Alaskan Air Command, after investigating various options, decided to build the White Alice Communications System, a system of Air Force-owned tropospheric scatter and microwave radio relay sites operated by the Air Force Communications Service (AFCS). The Unalakleet site 63°54′59″N 160°45′34″W was activated in 1957.

Unalakleet Air Force Station was very expensive to maintain, and was inactivated due to budget reductions on 30 September 1969, its mission being taken over by other AAC surveillance radar sites with upgraded and more capable equipment.

After the station's closure, the buildings, radars and communications antennas sat derelict and abandoned for decades. In 1998 Pacific Air Forces initiated "Operation Clean Sweep", in which abandoned Cold War stations in Alaska were remediated and the land restored to its previous state. After years of neglect the facilities at the station had lost any value they had when the site was closed. The site remediation of the radar, support and White Alice communication station was carried out by the 611th Civil Engineering Squadron at Elmendorf AFB, and remediation work was completed by 2005.

== Air Force units and assignments ==
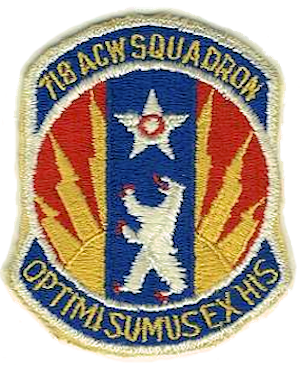
Emblem of the 718th Aircraft Control and Warning Squadron

Units:

- 718th Aircraft Control and Warning Squadron, 1953–1969

Assignments:

- 11th Air Division

== See also ==
- Alaskan Air Command
