= Ohlson Mountain Air Force Station =

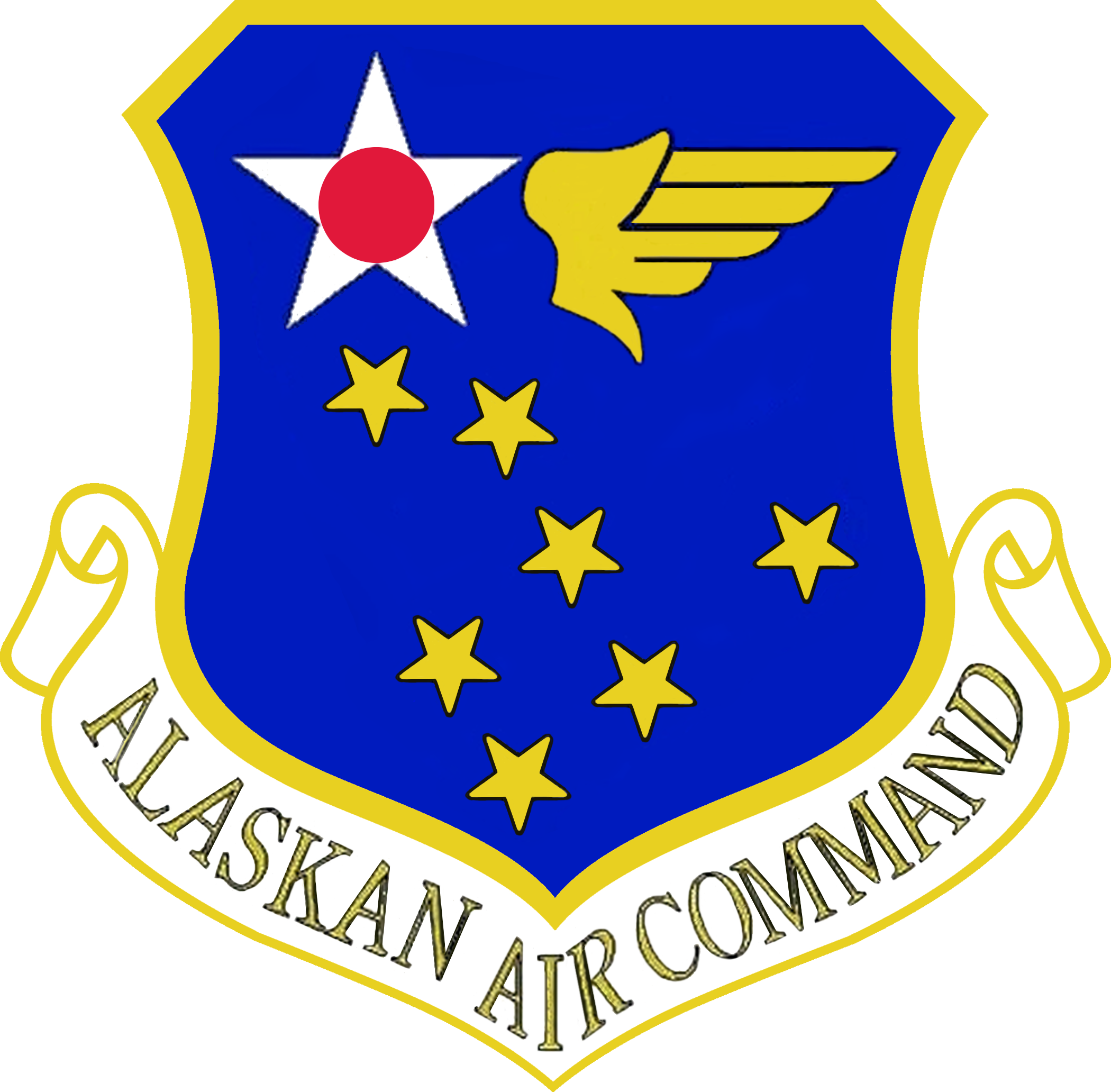
Ohlson Mountain Air Force Station
- Part of Alaskan Air Command (AAC)
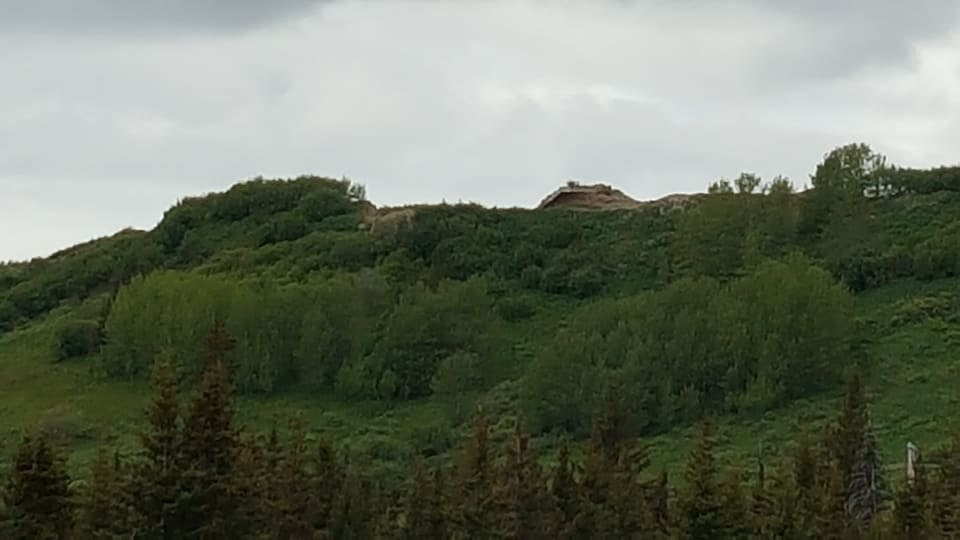
- Today a few concrete slabs are all that remain of the former facility

Site information
- Type: Air Force Station
- Controlled by: United States Air Force

Location
- Location of Ohlson Mountain AFS, Alaska
- Coordinates: 59°42′51″N 151°32′00″W

Site history
- Built: 1958
- In use: 1958-1963

Garrison information
- Garrison: 937th Aircraft Control and Warning Squadron (1958–1963)

Ohlson Mountain Air Force Station (AAC ID: F-22) is a closed United States Air Force General Surveillance Radar station. It was located 118 miles (190 km) south-southwest of Anchorage, Alaska.

== History ==
Ohlson Mountain AFS was a continental defense radar station constructed to provide the United States Air Force early warning of an attack by the Soviet Union on Alaska.

Plans were made for a permanent radar site beginning in late 1956. A site was located approximately 8 miles northeast of Homer, Alaska. The port facilities at Homer and the existing airport there were used to bring in construction supplies and equipment by Naval LST and towed barges. A gravel road was constructed through the wilderness to the new station which supplied access to the 1,600' hilltop site. Ohlson mountain is a very prominent hill, but technically not a mountain.

The buildings were, except for the civil engineering building, connected by heated hallways. As a result, personnel stationed there, with only very few exceptions, were able to wear "summer" uniforms year round, unless they had a need to go outside during the winter season. The coverings of the station's three radar towers were heated from within to keep the covering from becoming brittle from extreme cold, and thus subject to being damaged or destroyed by high winds. Tours at the station were limited to one year because of the psychological strain and physical hardships.

The 937th Aircraft Control and Warning Squadron, activated in February 1957 operated AN/FPS-3A, and AN/FPS-6 radars. As a surveillance station, its mission was to monitor the airspace for aircraft activity and provide information 24/7 to the Air Defense Direction Center at Fire Island AFS near Anchorage, where it was analyzed to determine range, direction altitude speed and whether or not aircraft were friendly or hostile.

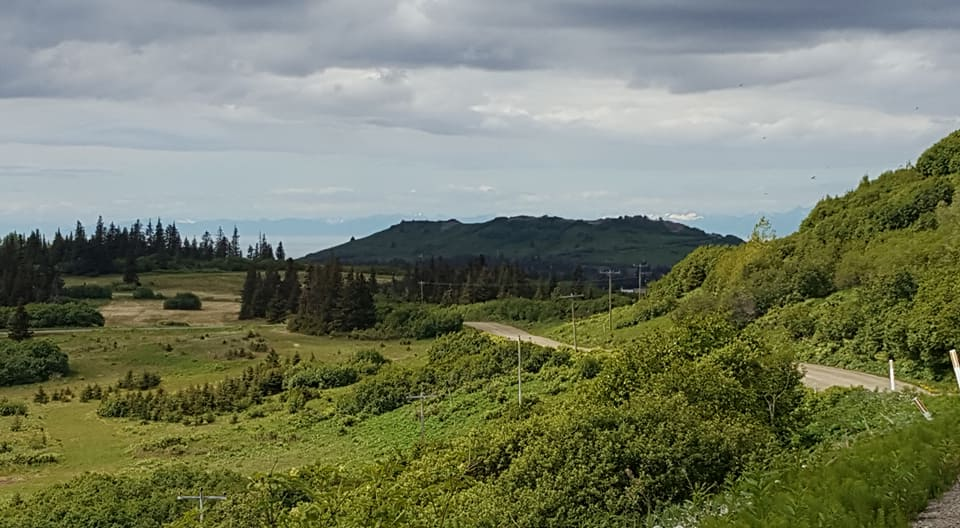
Ohlson Mountain is not a proper mountain but rather a very prominent hill with a wide view of the lower Cook Inlet region

The Alaskan Air Command, after investigating various options, constructed a White Alice Communications System communications site at the station, operated by the Air Force Communications Service (AFCS). The Bethel site 59°42′42″N 151°32′27″W was activated in 1958.

Ohlson Mountain Air Force Station was very expensive to maintain, and was inactivated due to budget reductions on 15 May 1963, its mission being taken over by other AAC surveillance radar sites with upgraded and more capable equipment.

After the station's closure, the site was sold, and the purchaser leased part of the facility back to the Defense Nuclear Agency. Stanford Research Institute conducted auroral studies at the site. Eventually, the buildings, radars and communications antennas sat derelict and abandoned for decades. In 1985, someone reported that the site was the location of a PCB spill and 66 drums of contaminated equipment, soil, and investigation derived waste were removed. In 1991, the site was closed after additional contaminated soils were removed and remediated. In 1998 Pacific Air Forces initiated "Operation Clean Sweep", in which abandoned Cold War stations in Alaska were remediated and the land restored to its previous state. After years of neglect the facilities at the station had lost any value they had when the site was closed. The site remediation of the radar, support and White Alice communication station was carried out by the 611th Civil Engineering Squadron at Elmendorf AFB, and remediation work was completed by 2005.

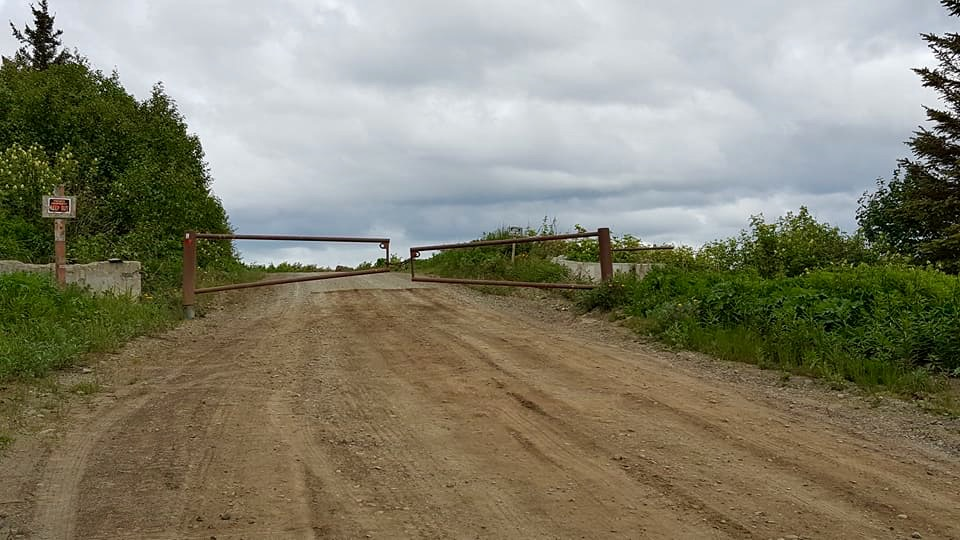
Today the road to the summit is closed except for gravel pit operations

After the site was removed, the hilltop became a gravel pit and informal shooting range. Shooting and other destructive activities eventually caused nearby residents to petition for closure of the area to the public.

== Air Force units and assignments ==
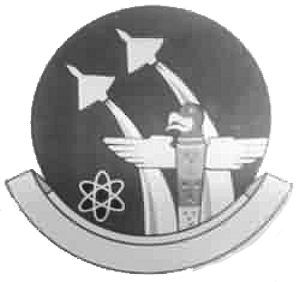
Emblem of the 937th Aircraft Control and Warning Squadron

=== Units ===
- Established as the 937th Aircraft Control and Warning Squadron

Activated on 8 February 1957
Discontinued and inactivated on 1 October 1963

=== Assignments ===
- 5039th Air Base Wing, 8 February 1957
- 5039th Aircraft Control and Warning Group (later 5040th Aircraft Control and Warning Group, 1 June 1957
- 10th Air Division, 1 June 1959
- 5070th Air Defense Wing, 1 August 1960
- Alaskan Air Command, 1 October 1961 - 1 October 1963

== See also ==
- Alaskan Air Command
