= 18th Strategic Aerospace Division =

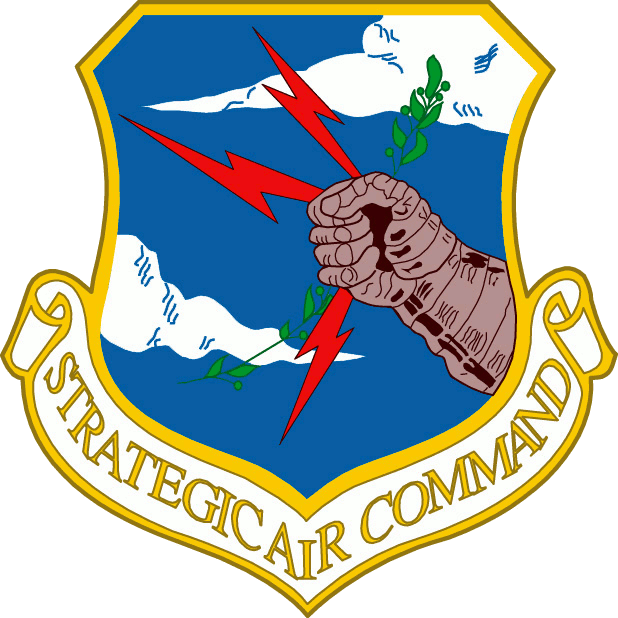
- Active: 1929–1942; 1942–1944; 1959–1968
- Country: United States
- Branch: United States Air Force

Insignia
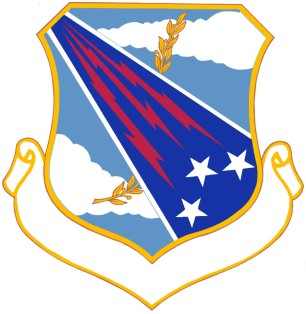
- 18th Strategic Aerospace Division emblem (Note: Approved 14 June 1960;. Description: On a sky proper, two cloud formations, one issuant from sinister chief, the other from dexter base fesswise argent, surmounted by an olive branch originating in dexter base and extending to chief in pale or, overall a bend diminished to chief sable fimbriated of the second [color] and charged with three lightning flashes radiant from dexter chief bendwise gules, each flash terminating in sinister base near a mullet one and two bendwise of the second [color] and all within a diminished border of the third [color].)

The 18th Strategic Aerospace Division is an inactive United States Air Force unit. Its last assignment was with the Fifteenth Air Force at Fairchild Air Force Base, Washington, where it was inactivated on 2 July 1968.

== History ==
The 18th Composite Wing served as part of the defense force for the Hawaiian Islands from 1 May 1931 – 29 January 1942. It inactivated after suffering disastrous losses in the Japanese attack on Pearl Harbor (7 December 1941).

From June 1942 until 1944, it operated as the 18th Replacement Wing, processing personnel entering Second Air Force.

Redesignated as the 18th Air Division on 1 July 1959, it assured that assigned wings were organized, crewed, trained, and equipped to conduct long-range bombardment operations using either nuclear or conventional weapons.

The division was redesignated as 18 Strategic Aerospace Division on 15 February 1962, and also developed and maintained a strategic missile operational capability. Between 1965 and 1968, subordinate units of the 18th loaned aircraft and aircrews to SAC organizations for combat during the Vietnam War.

The division was inactivated on 2 July 1968 due to budget constraints.

== Lineage ==
- Established as the 18th Composite Wing on 8 May 1929

Activated on 1 May 1931
Redesignated 18th Wing on 1 September 1937
Redesignated 18th Bombardment Wing on 19 October 1940
Inactivated on 29 January 1942

- Redesignated 18th Replacement Wing on 17 June 1942

Activated on 23 June 1942
Disestablished on 11 April 1944

- Reestablished and redesignated 18th Air Division on 20 May 1959

Activated on 1 July 1959
Redesignated 18th Strategic Aerospace Division on 15 February 1962
Discontinued and inactivated on 2 July 1968

=== Assignments ===
- Hawaiian Department, 1 May 1931
- Hawaiian Air Force, 1 November 1940 – 29 January 1942
- Second Air Force, 23 June 1942 – 11 April 1944
- Fifteenth Air Force, 1 July 1959 – 2 July 1968

=== Components ===
Wings

- 6th Strategic Wing: 25 March 1967 – 2 July 1968
- 91st Bombardment Wing: 1 July 1963 – 1 September 1964
- 92d Bombardment Wing (later 92 Strategic Aerospace Wing): 1 July 1959 – 2 July 1968
- 320th Bombardment Wing: 1 July 1965 – 2 July 1966
- 341st Strategic Missile Wing: 2 July 1966 – 2 July 1968
- 462d Strategic Aerospace Wing: 1 February 1963 – 25 June 1966
- 4157th Strategic Wing: 1 July 1965 – 25 March 1967
- 4158th Strategic Wing: 1 July 1965 – 25 June 1966
- 4170th Strategic Wing: 1 July 1959 – 1 February 1963

Groups

- 5th Composite Group (later, 5 Bombardment Group): 1 May 1931 – 29 January 1942
- 11th Bombardment Group: 1 February 1940 – 29 January 1942
- 18th Pursuit Group: 1 May 1931 – 1 November 1940

=== Stations ===
- Fort Shafter, Hawaii, 1 May 1931
- Hickam Field, Hawaii Territory, 30 October 1937 – 29 January 1942
- Salt Lake City, Utah, 23 June 1942 – 11 April 1944
- Fairchild Air Force Base, Washington, 1 July 1959 – 2 July 1968

=== Campaigns ===
Campaign Streamer	Campaign	Dates	Notes
	Central Pacific	7 December 1941 – 19 January 1942	18th Bombardment Wing
	American Theater without inscription	23 June 1942 – 11 April 1944	18th Replacement Wing

== See also ==
- List of United States Air Force air divisions
