= Bethel Air Force Station =

Closed United States Air Force General Surveillance Radar station (1958-1963)

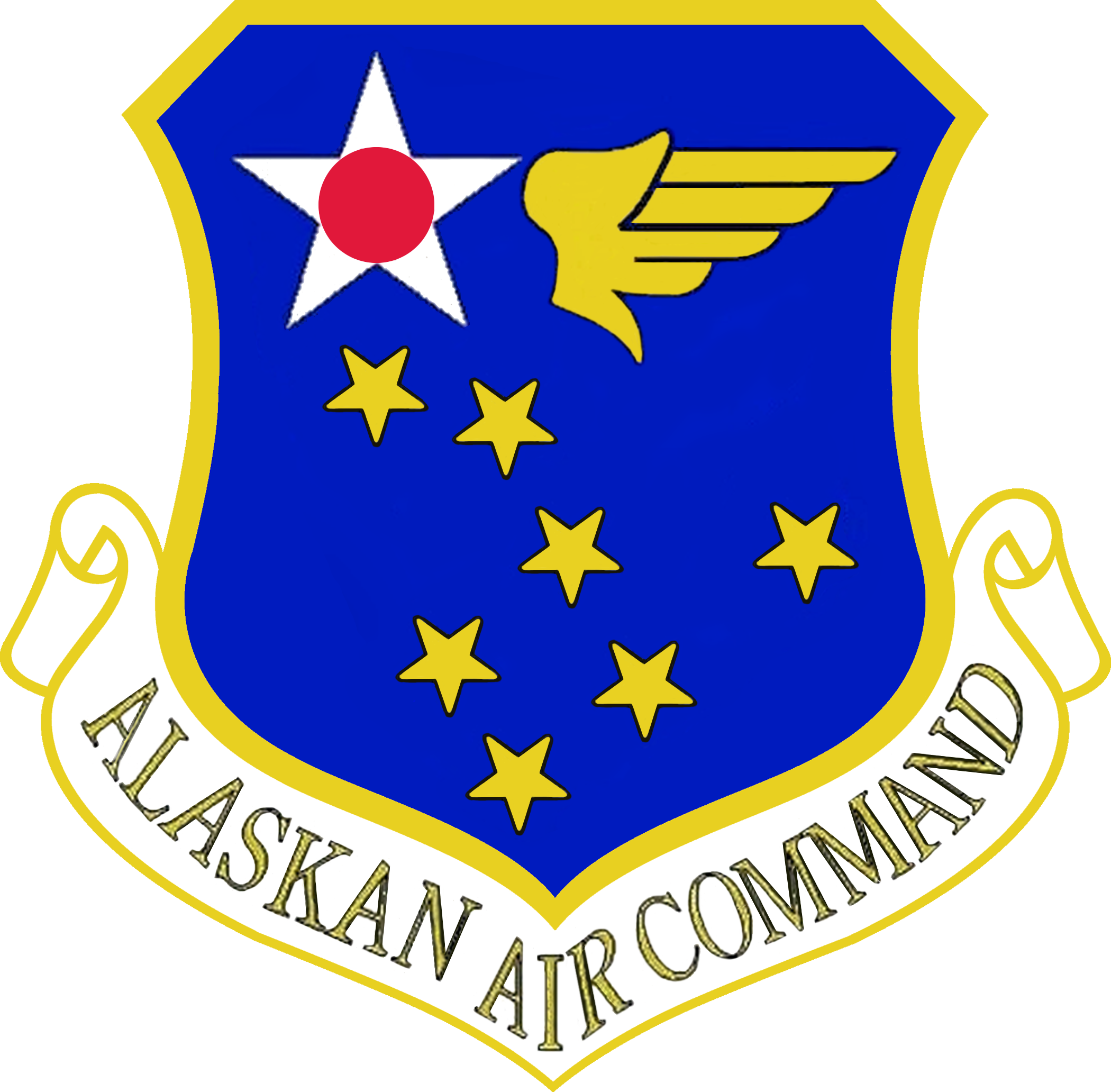
Bethel Air Force Station
- Part of Alaskan Air Command (AAC)

Site information
- Type: Air Force Station
- Controlled by: United States Air Force

Location
- Location of Bethel AFS, Alaska
- Coordinates: 60°47′07″N 161°52′58″W

Site history
- Built: 1958
- In use: 1958-1963

Garrison information
- Garrison: 713th Aircraft Control and Warning Squadron (1953-1969)

Bethel Air Force Station (AAC ID: F-21) is a closed United States Air Force General Surveillance Radar station. It was located 402 miles (647 km) west of Anchorage, Alaska.

== History ==
Bethel AFS was a continental defense radar station constructed to provide the United States Air Force early warning of an attack by the Soviet Union on Alaska.

A radar site was initially activated in September 1951 at Bethel, Alaska, manned by Federalized Alaska Air National Guardsmen and equipped with a World War II AN/TPS-1B radar as a result of the Korean War and the threat of a communist attack on Alaska. The guardsmen were designated as Detachment "C-3", 626th Aircraft Control and Warning Squadron, and commanded by the 10th Air Division at Fire Island AFS near Anchorage. The guardsmen were returned to state control in March 1952 and the provisional station was closed.

Plans were made for a permanent radar site beginning in late 1956. In 1957, acreage was acquired approximately 5 miles west of Bethel, Alaska for construction of the station. Using the existing port facilities at Bethel on the Kuskokwim River, Towed barges were able to land construction equipment and material at the town, which was transported along a gravel road to the construction site. In addition, an airstrip 60°46′50″N 161°50′09″W was constructed near the site, about halfway between the station and Bethel, allowing cargo transports and personnel to fly into and out of the area.

The station and radar site was constructed on a flat area just to the west of some hills. The buildings were, except for the civil engineering building connected by heated hallways. As a result, personnel stationed there, with only very few exceptions, were able to wear "summer" uniforms year round, unless they had a need to go outside during the winter season. The coverings of the station's three radar towers were heated from within to keep the covering from becoming brittle from extreme cold, and thus subject to being damaged or destroyed by high winds. Tours at the station were limited to one year because of the psychological strain and physical hardships.

The 713th Aircraft Control and Warning Squadron operated AN/FPS-8, AN/FPS-4, AN/FPS-6, and AN/FPS-6B radars. As a surveillance station, its mission was to monitor the airspace for aircraft activity and provide information 24/7 to the air defense Direction Center at Fire Island AFS near Anchorage, where it was analyzed to determine range, direction altitude speed and whether or not aircraft were friendly or hostile.

The Alaskan Air Command, after investigating various options, constructed a White Alice Communications System communications site at the station, operated by the Air Force Communications Service (AFCS). The Bethel site 60°46′52″N 161°53′10″W was activated in 1958.

Bethel Air Force Station was very expensive to maintain, and was inactivated due to budget reductions on 15 May 1963, its mission being taken over by other AAC surveillance radar sites with upgraded and more capable equipment.

Today the site remains abandoned and deteriorating. Aerial imagery clearly shows abandoned buildings, radar towers and communications antennas, all in a highly deteriorated state.

== Air Force units and assignments ==
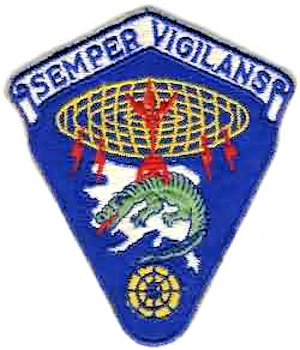
Emblem of the 713th Aircraft Control and Warning Squadron

=== Units ===
- 713th Aircraft Control and Warning Squadron

Activated at Elmendorf AFB on 8 February 1957
Moved to Bethel AFS on 1 June 1957
Discontinued and inactivated on 1 October 1963

=== Assignments ===
- 5039th Air Base Wing, 8 February 1957
- 5039th Aircraft Control & Warning Group (later 5040th Aircraft Control and Warning Group), 1 June 1957
- 10th Air Division, 1 November 1959
- 5070th Air Defense Wing, 1 August 1960
- Alaskan Air Command, 1 November 1961 - 1 October 1963

== See also ==
- Alaskan Air Command
