= 4158th Strategic Wing =

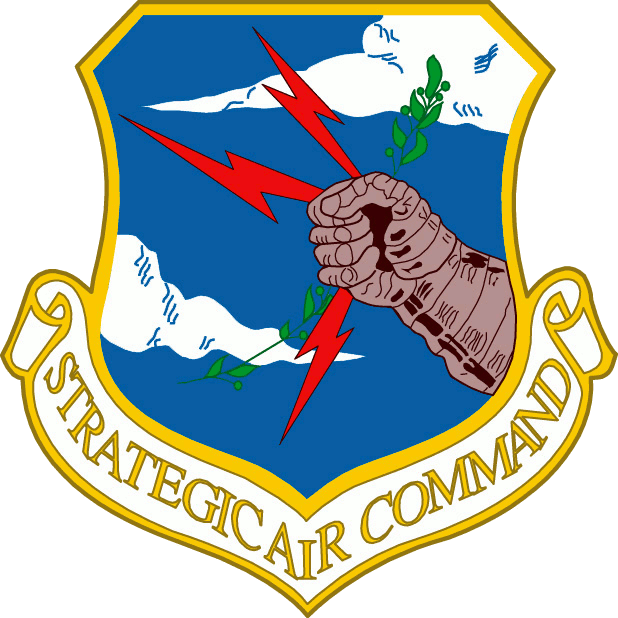
4158th Strategic Wing

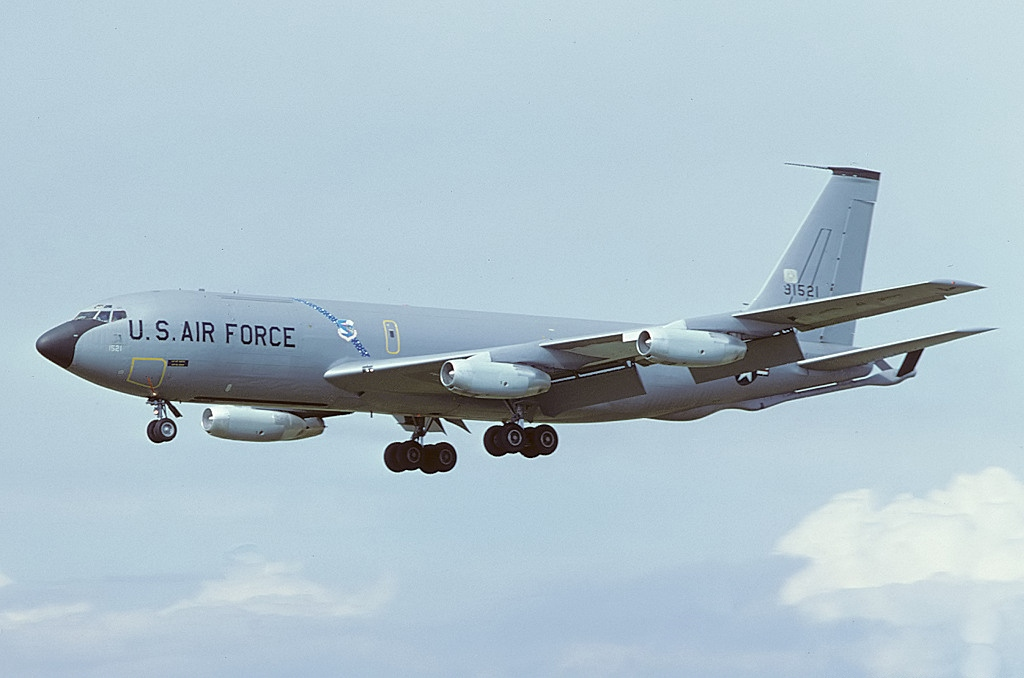
- Boeing KC-135A Stratotanker in Strategic Air Command markings
- Active: 1960-1966
- Country: United States
- Branch: United States Air Force
- Type: Strategic Wing
- Size: Control deployed bomber, reconnaissance and air refueling units
- Part of: Strategic Air Command

Insignia
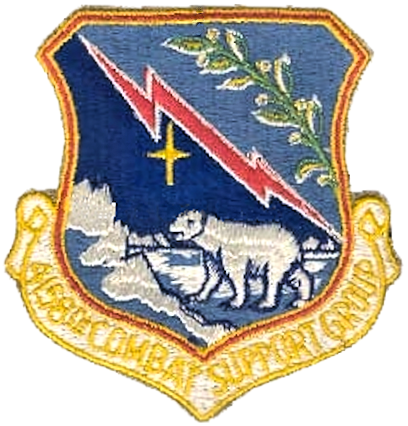
- Patch with 4158th Strategic Wing emblem

The 4158th Strategic Wing is a discontinued United States Air Force unit. It was active in Alaska from 1960 to 1966 as a control and support organization for Strategic Air Command (SAC) units deployed to Elmendorf Air Force Base, Alaska.

== History and Operations ==
The 4158th Strategic Wing was organized in 1960 as the 4158th Combat Support Group, a command element for Strategic Air Command (SAC) units deployed to Elmendorf Air Force Base, Alaska. It was expanded to wing status in 1963. It first assigned to Fifteenth Air Force, but on 1 July 1965 it was reassigned to the 18th Strategic Aerospace Division.

The wing commanded SAC elements deployed to Alaska during deployments from United States bases. Its major subordinate unit was the 73d Munitions Maintenance Squadron, which managed the special weapons for deployed units. It also supported deployed reconnaissance assets and a Tanker Task Force.

In 1964 the wing's buildings were damaged by an earthquake that shook Elmendorf. The 4158th was inactivated in 1966 after SAC Tanker Task Force commitments at Elmendorf terminated at the end of 1965. SAC operations in Alaska continued at Eielson Air Force Base.

== Lineage ==
- Designated as the 4158th Combat Support Group and organized on 1 July 1960

Redesignated 4158th Strategic Wing on 1 November 1963

- Discontinued on 25 June 1966

=== Assignments ===
- Fifteenth Air Force: 1 July 1960
- 18th Strategic Aerospace Division: 1 July 1965 - 25 June 1966

=== Components ===
- 73d Aviation Depot Squadron (later 73d Munitions Maintenance Squadron): 1 July 1960 - 25 June 1966

=== Stations ===
- Elmendorf Air Force Base, Alaska: 1 July 1960 - 25 June 1966
