= Tanana Valley =

Region of central Alaska

Coordinates: 64.4°N 147.0°W

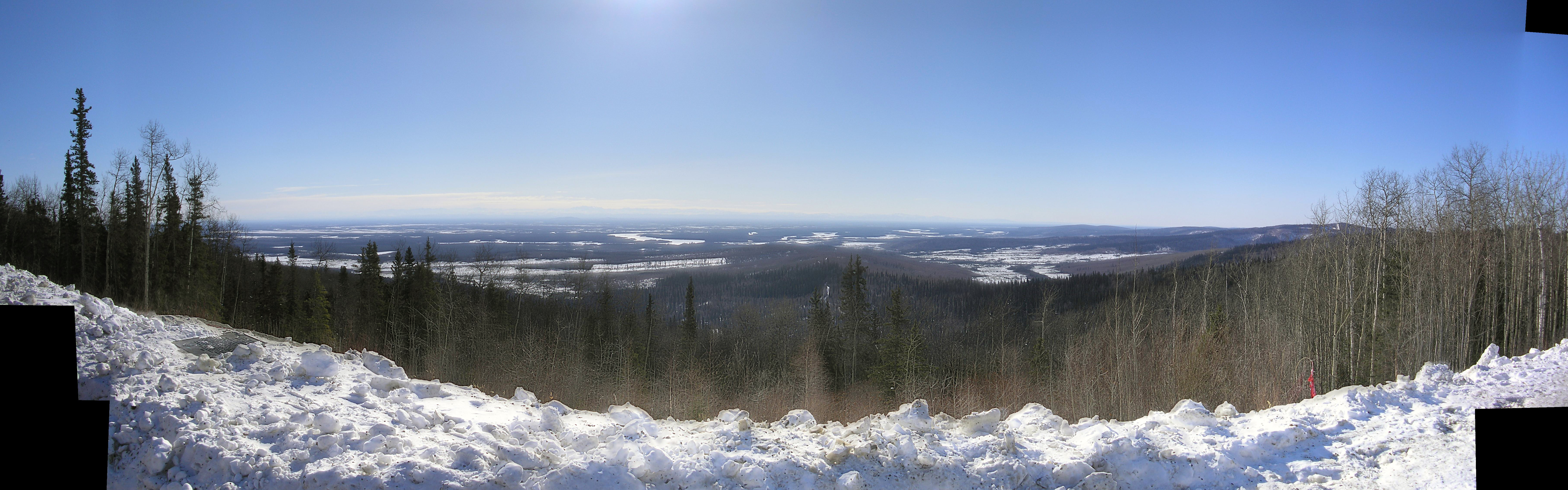
A portion of the Tanana Valley, as seen from the Parks Monument overlook of the George Parks Highway east of Ester.

The Tanana Valley is a lowland region in central Alaska in the United States, on the north side of the Alaska Range, where the Tanana River emerges from the mountains. Traditional inhabitants of the valley are Tanana Athabaskans of Alaskan Athabaskans.

== Climate ==
The region experiences great extremes of temperature during the year. During the winter months, the air is prone to stratification due to temperature inversions, leading to thick fogs. At the same time, a katabatic wind called the "Tanana Valley Jet" can form, blowing from the southeast to the northwest. During the summer, the surrounding plains are generally boglike, and include much permafrost and many pingos.

== Communities ==
The Tanana Valley is the most populated area of Alaska north of the Alaska Range. Its largest city is Fairbanks. Other communities include:

- College
- Chena Hot Springs
- Eielson AFB
- Ester
- Fort Wainwright
- Fox
- Manley Hot Springs
- Nenana
- North Pole
- Tok
- Two Rivers
- Pleasant Valley
- Salcha

== Archaeology ==
According to James Q. Jacobs, Tanana Valley has the earliest evidence of human occupation in Alaska.

"At least three distinct lithic complexes appear in the Alaskan archaeological record at approximately the same time, between 12,060 and 11,660 B.P. The earliest firm evidence of human occupation is in the Tanana Valley in Alaska. At the Broken Mammoth, Swan Point, Mead, and Healy Lake, Alaska sites, the oldest dates range between 12,060 BP and 11,410. These sites contain cultural remains considered ancestral to today's Alaskan Native inhabitants.

The oldest stratified sites in the Nenana Valley region date to from 11,820 to 11,010 BP.

The Mesa complex in northern Alaska dates to 11,660 BP."

More recently, Tanana Valley sites have been dated to pre-Clovis period, or 13,000–14,000 cal yr BP.

=== Sites ===
The Broken Mammoth site, the Swan Point Archaeological Site, and the Mead Archaeological Site are the earliest dated sites in Alaska. They are located along the Tanana River.

== See also ==
- Nenana Valley
