= Wiki Peak =

Mountain in Alaska, US

- Location within Alaska
- Interactive map of Wiki Peak

Highest point
- Elevation: 7,655 ft (2,333 m)
- Coordinates: 61°56′18.1″N 141°12′43.4″W

Geography
- Location: Southeast Fairbanks (CA), Alaska, U.S.
- Parent range: Nutzotin Mountains
- Topo map: USGS McCarthy D-1

Wiki Peak is a mountain in the Nutzotin Mountains of Alaska within Wrangell-St. Elias National Park and Preserve. It is located near the Canada–United States border. The best way to reach Wiki Peak is to charter a flight into Horsfeld. Crossing Beaver Creek is necessary to access Wiki Peak. The creek can be high and dangerous or easily crossed, depending on time of year and the weather.

== Obsidian ==
Wiki Peak obsidian was used by humans as early as 13,400 years before present(YBP). Such obsidian was recovered at the Broken Mammoth site. Such obsidian was also used at the Walker Road, Alaska, site, and Moose Creek, Alaska, site in the same area—all dating to before 13,000 YBP.

"The Wiki Peak obsidian source is in the Nutzotin Mountains (Wrangell-St Elias National Park). An investigation of the Wiki Peak obsidian source was conducted in the past decade, and over 65 archaeological sites were recorded in a survey of the immediate area. The high concentration of sites is typical for other obsidian source areas in Alaska and northwest Canada, with few exceptions.
