= Moose Creek, Alaska =

- CDP
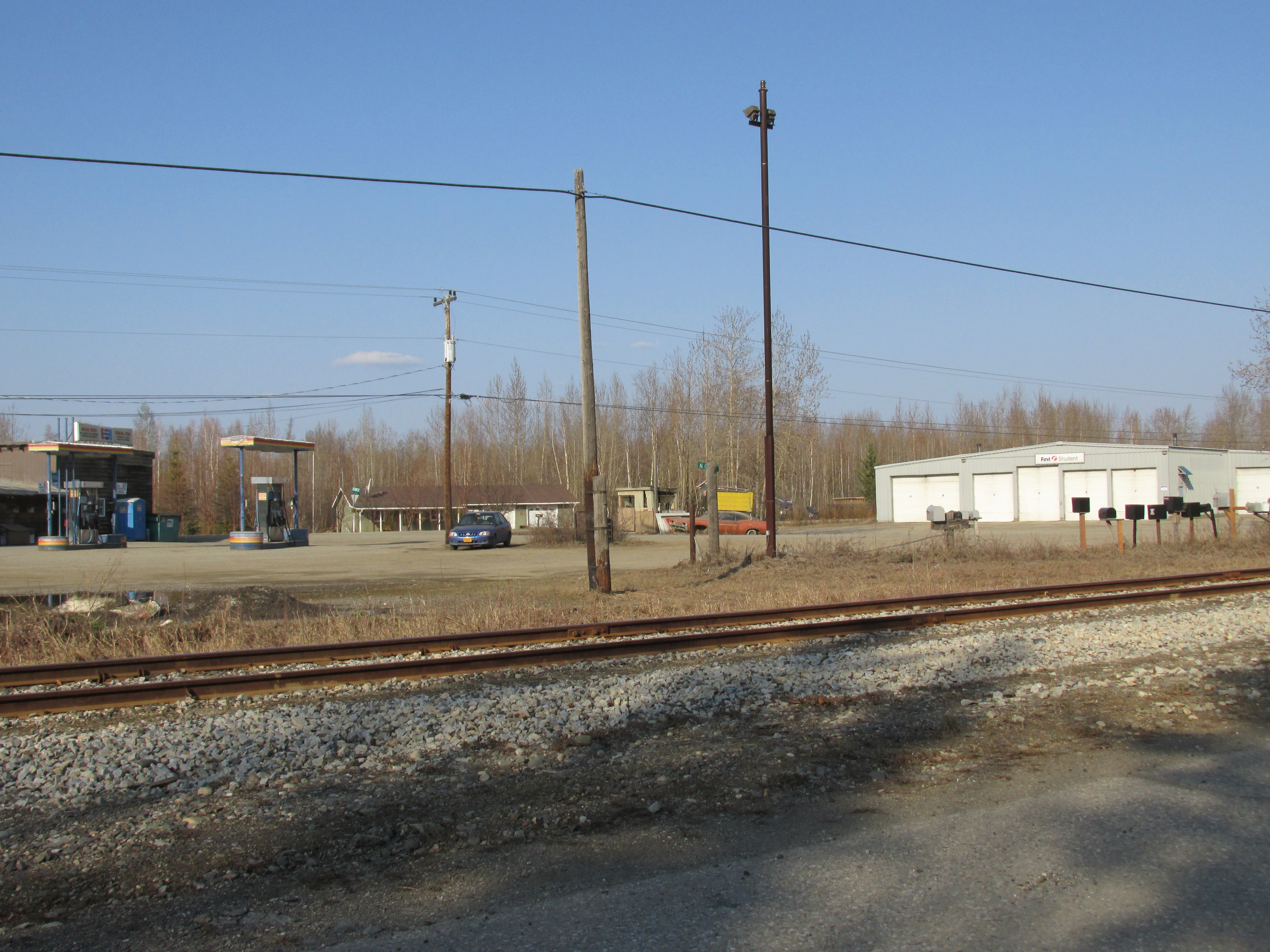
- Moose Creek General Store and First Student bus barn marks the "commercial center" of Moose Creek.

- Location within Fairbanks North Star Borough and the state of Alaska
- Coordinates: 64°42′45″N 147°9′40″W
- Country: United States
- State: Alaska
- Borough: Fairbanks North Star

Government
  - Borough mayor: Bryce J. Ward
  - State senator: Robert Myers (R)
  - State rep.: Mike Prax (R)

Area
  - Total: 1.65 sq mi (4.27 km^{2})
  - Land: 1.54 sq mi (3.99 km^{2})
  - Water: 0.11 sq mi (0.28 km^{2})
- Elevation: 522 ft (159 m)

Population (2020)
  - Total: 534
  - Density: 346.5/sq mi (133.77/km^{2})
- Time zone: UTC-9 (Alaska (AKST))
  - Summer (DST): UTC-8 (AKDT)
- ZIP code: 99705
- Area code: 907
- FIPS code: 02-50080
- GNIS feature ID: 1406548

Moose Creek is a census-designated place (CDP) in Fairbanks North Star Borough in the U.S. state of Alaska. As of the 2020 census, Moose Creek had a population of 534. It is part of the Fairbanks, Alaska Metropolitan Statistical Area. Moose Creek is located south of Fairbanks, Alaska along the Richardson Highway. Moose Creek is bordered by Eielson Air Force Base to the south, the Tanana River to the west, and the Chena River Flood Control Project to the north.

== Geography ==
Moose Creek is located at 64°42′45″N 147°9′40″W (64.712474, -147.161128).

According to the United States Census Bureau, the CDP has a total area of 1.7 square miles (4.4 km^{2}), of which, 1.6 square miles (4.1 km^{2}) of it is land and 0.1 square miles (0.26 km^{2}) of it (6.51%) is water. It is located beside the Moose Creek Bluff, which is a medium size hill with a rocky cliff facing the Richardson Highway.

== Climate ==
Moose Creek gets 13 inches of rain per year. On average, there are 154 sunny days per year. The January low is -40. The temperature is comparable to Fairbanks and North Pole, Alaska.

== Demographics ==
Historical population
| Census | Pop. | Note | %± |
|---|---|---|---|
| 1980 | 510 | | — |
| 1990 | 610 | | 19.6% |
| 2000 | 542 | | −11.1% |
| 2010 | 747 | | 37.8% |
| 2020 | 534 | | −28.5% |
U.S. Decennial Census

Moose Creek first appeared on the 1980 U.S. Census as a census-designated place (CDP).

As of the census of 2000, there were 542 people, 223 households, and 128 families residing in the CDP. The population density was 342.7 inhabitants per square mile (132.3/km^{2}). There were 280 housing units at an average density of 177.1 per square mile (68.4/km^{2}). The racial makeup of the CDP was 88.38% White, 3.69% Black or African American, 2.21% Native American, 1.29% Asian, 0.37% Pacific Islander, 0.92% from other races, and 3.14% from two or more races. Hispanic or Latino of any race were 2.95% of the population.

There were 223 households, out of which 30.5% had children under the age of 18 living with them, 43.0% were married couples living together, 8.5% had a female householder with no husband present, and 42.2% were non-families. 29.1% of all households were made up of individuals, and 3.1% had someone living alone who was 65 years of age or older. The average household size was 2.43 and the average family size was 3.06.

In the CDP the population was spread out, with 24.2% under the age of 18, 16.8% from 18 to 24, 35.4% from 25 to 44, 19.7% from 45 to 64, and 3.9% who were 65 years of age or older. The median age was 30 years. For every 100 females there were 143.0 males. For every 100 females age 18 and over, there were 146.1 males.

The median income for a household in the CDP was $44,375, and the median income for a family was $44,018. Males had a median income of $24,643 versus $19,583 for females. The per capita income for the CDP was $17,980. About 11.0% of families and 9.4% of the population were below the poverty line, including 17.8% of those under age 18 and 33.3% of those age 65 or over.

== Archaeology ==
Coordinates: 64°43'30"N, 147°13'05"W

Chugwater is a large (100 x 165m) site on the east summit of Moose Creek Bluff near the town of North Pole, Alaska 25 km southeast of Fairbanks. Samples of charcoal and sedimentary organics obtained from this site demonstrate human occupation going back before 13,000 years ago.

The site is located between the Chena and Tanana Rivers. Moose Creek Bluff contains the only pictographs documented in interior Alaska (Giddings 1941).

"Strata in some areas [of Moose Creek] contain artifacts diagnostic of much of the past 11,000 years of prehistory in sediments averaging 30cm deep, and seldom exceeding 50cm. Lively (1988) identified three separate components:

Component 1, a basal non-microblade level with teardrop-shaped (Chindadn) bifaces and small endscrapers similar to Nenana Valley assemblages antedating 10,600 BP (Powers & Hoffecker 1989);

Component 2, a microblade-bearing level with asymmetric bifacial points or knives attributed to the early Denali complex or American Paleoarctic tradition (APT); and

Component 3, an upper microblade-bearing level with notched and lanceolate points typical of Tuktu or Late Denali sites of the interior. Maitland (1986:115) also attributed several artifacts in the upper levels to an incursion or influence by Norton peoples."

Obsidian used at Moose Creek came from the Wiki Peak source near the Canada–United States border. Such obsidian was also recovered at the Broken Mammoth site, and it dates to before 13,000 cal BP.

== See also ==
- Dry Creek Archeological Site
- Denali National Park and Preserve
- Tanana Athabaskans
