= Swan Point Archaeological Site =

Archaeological site in Alaska, United States

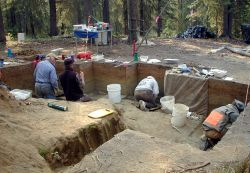
Swan Point Excavation

The Swan Point Archeological Site, discovered in 1991, is an open-air site composed of several Late Pleistocene and Holocene layers, located in Alaska. The site, in the Tanana Valley, has yielded the earliest known evidence of human habitation in Eastern Beringia, being dated to circa 14,000 cal BP. Swan Point is the oldest archaeological site in the Americas whose age is not disputed. The site was listed on the National Register of Historic Places in 2008.

== Occupation ==
Swan Point has been occupied at least six times since ca 14,500 cal yr B.P. with evidence of charcoal that has been radiocarbon dated to approximately 14,000 B.P. The charcoal dating makes this the oldest known site in the Tanana River Valley. The six occupation periods include:

=== Terminal Pleistocene ===
This is the oldest cultural sequence present, dating from approximately 11,660 RCYBP to 10,000 RCYBP. Artifacts found at this level include worked mammoth tusk fragments, microblades, microblade core preparation flakes, blades, dihedral burins, red ochre, pebble hammers, and quartz hammer tools and choppers. The microblades found at this zone are significant as they are the oldest securely dated microblades in eastern Beringia.

=== Latest Pleistocene ===
A variety of bifacial points were found at this level, which dates to approximately 10,230 ± 80 cal yr B.P, including lanceolate points with convex to straight bases, along with graver spurs, quartz pebble choppers and hammers. The mammoth artifacts found in the Latest Pleistocene zone date to approximately 14,000 cal yr B.P. With no other mammoth remains found beyond tusk ivory, it is assumed that the people who lived on the site scavenged the ivory rather than hunting the mammoth themselves.

=== Early Late Holocene ===
Artifacts found at this level (7500-8200 cal BP) include bifaces, unifaces, and microblade cores. This level is associated with high mobility behaviors.

=== Mid to Late Holocene ===
Artifacts found at this level (2500-5500 cal BP) include lanceolate points with heavy edge grinding, sub-conical microblade cores, microblades and scrapers. The upper layer of this level also has notched points, lanceolates, flake burins, microblades, a microblade core and a graver spur on a flake. The lower levels reveal artifact scatter patterns suggestive of tent rings.

=== Late Holocene ===
This level represents the period between 700 and 2100 years of the Holocene with artifacts including projectile points, pecked stone fragments, scrapers, straight-based lanceolate points and microblades. This occupation includes the remains of an early semi-subterranean house (1850-1900 cal BP). A footprint matching a pre-teen individual was recovered in association with the house remains.

=== Historic ===
Site use in historic time is indicated by the presence of artifacts such as tin cans, 30-30 rifle cartridges, an iron knife tang, an early-historic glass bottle and a moose bone flesher.

== Climate and Resources ==
Unlike the Broken Mammoth site, the remains of fauna and flora at Swan Point are comparatively few and poorly preserved. The remains that were discovered include swan, goose and moose recovered from the mid to late Holocene zone.

Because of its close proximity to the Broken Mammoth site it can be inferred that the climate at Swan Point was similar with lowland tundra and low vegetation. Charcoal remains indicate wood from Populus and Willow which are associated with the oldest artifacts found at the site.

The stratigraphy at Swan Point is slightly different from the other sites in the Tanana River Valley; it is thinner because it is farther from the Tanana River. It consists of one meter of late Quaternary aeolian sediments overlying bedrock. The stratigraphic sequence is firmly dated spanning the last 11,700 cal years. Grayish aeolian sand overlies the bedrock and overlying that is a pebble layer. Above this is a tan loess layer in which numerous cultural levels and palaeosols are found. At 50–55 cm below the surface cultural material including hearth charcoal was found dating to 10,230 ± 80 cal yr B.P. The modern soil is typically brown sub-arctic forest soil. The lateral continuity of the layers indicates that there has been no displacement of the stratigraphy since the loess accumulation, indicating the dating for the materials found within it should be fairly be precise.

== Artifacts and features ==
The remains of several hearths were found at Swan Point. Hearths found in the Holocene period have mostly charcoal while earlier hearths at the site include charcoal and some bone. The earliest zone, dating to the Terminal Pleistocene, had no signs of a traditional hearth. Some burned residue was found at this zone, implying that before the mid to late Holocene the site was only used as a temporary occupation without repeated use of fire.

An analysis of the lipids and fatty acids in these hearths was conducted in 2008. The report concluded that the bones of animals not only contributed to the diet of the occupants but the marrow and grease was a fuel source. One hearth sample 19792, is believed to come from a large animal, similar to the Red Deer. Hearth samples 19413 and 19421 also have lipids of animal origin from a monogastric herbivore. Sample 19529 contained lipids from a ruminant herbivore and plant material from seeds, indicating that bones from more than one species of animal fueled the fire of early Swan Point occupation hearths.

The lithics in the earliest levels at Swan Point yielded microblades, which were not found at nearby Broken Mammoth and Meade sites. Lithics of this time period include bifacial tools, blade and microblades, choppers and scrapers of varying size; tools made of ivory are also present. Carbon residue of a chert platform rejuvenation flake has been radiocarbon dated to 13,800 B.P. an indication over the age of the pre Terminal Pleistocene lithics.

The next time period where significant lithics have been found at Swan Point was between 13,000 and 9,500 C. yr B.P. when the Chindadn point type 3 is prevalent. Microblade technology is associated with this period at Healy Lake site but not Broken Mammoth. Swan Point also yields some unique triangular bifaces with corners and broken tips reworked into graver spurs.

Obsidian lithics made from material from the Wrangell Mountains have also been found at Swan Point in the lowest levels of the loess, comparable to the lithics found at Broken Mammoth. The obsidian microblades found at Broken Mammoth were made from the same Obsidian material as the ones found at Swan Point indicating a strong connection between the two sites.

== See also ==
- National Register of Historic Places listings in Southeast Fairbanks Census Area, Alaska

== Bibliography ==
- Holmes, Charles E. 2011. The Beringian and Transitional Periods in Alaska: Technology of the East Beringian Tradition as Viewed from Swan Point. In From the Yenisei to the Yukon: Interpreting Lithic Assemblages Variability in Late Pleistocene/Early Holocene Beringia, edited by T. Goebel and Ian Buvit, pp. 179–191. Texas A&M University Press, College Station.
- Kedrowski, B.L., B.A. Crass, J.A. Behm, J.C. Luetke, A.L. Nichols, A.M. Moreck, and C.E. Holmes 2009. GC/MS Analysis of Fatty Acids from Ancient Hearth Residues at the Swan Point Archaeological Site. Archaeometry 51(1):110-122. doi:10.1111/j.1475-4754.2008.00384.x
- Hirasawa, Yu and Charles Holmes 2015. Microblade Production Technology at Swan Point from the Terminal Pleistocene to the Middle Holocene. Paper presented at 42nd Annual Meeting of the Alaska Anthropology Association, March 4–7, Anchorage, Alaska.
- Smith, Gerad M. 2020 Ethnoarchaeology of the Middle Tanana Valley, Alaska. PhD dissertation, Anthropology Department, University of Alaska Fairbanks {{DOI: 10.13140/RG.2.2.17882.98247}}
- Smith, Gerad M., Ted Parsons, Ryan P. Harrod, Charles E. Holmes, Joshua D. Reuther, and Ben A. Potter 2019. A Track in the Tanana: Forensic analysis of a Late Holocene footprint from central Alaska. Journal of Archaeological Science: Reports. 24:900-912. {{DOI: 10.1016/j.jasrep.2019.03.016}}
