= 168th Air Refueling Squadron =

Alaska Air National Guard unit

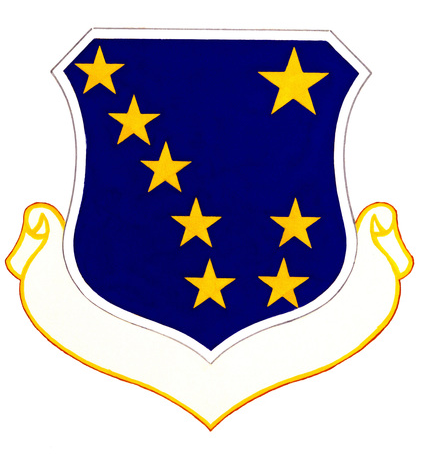
168th Air Refueling Squadron

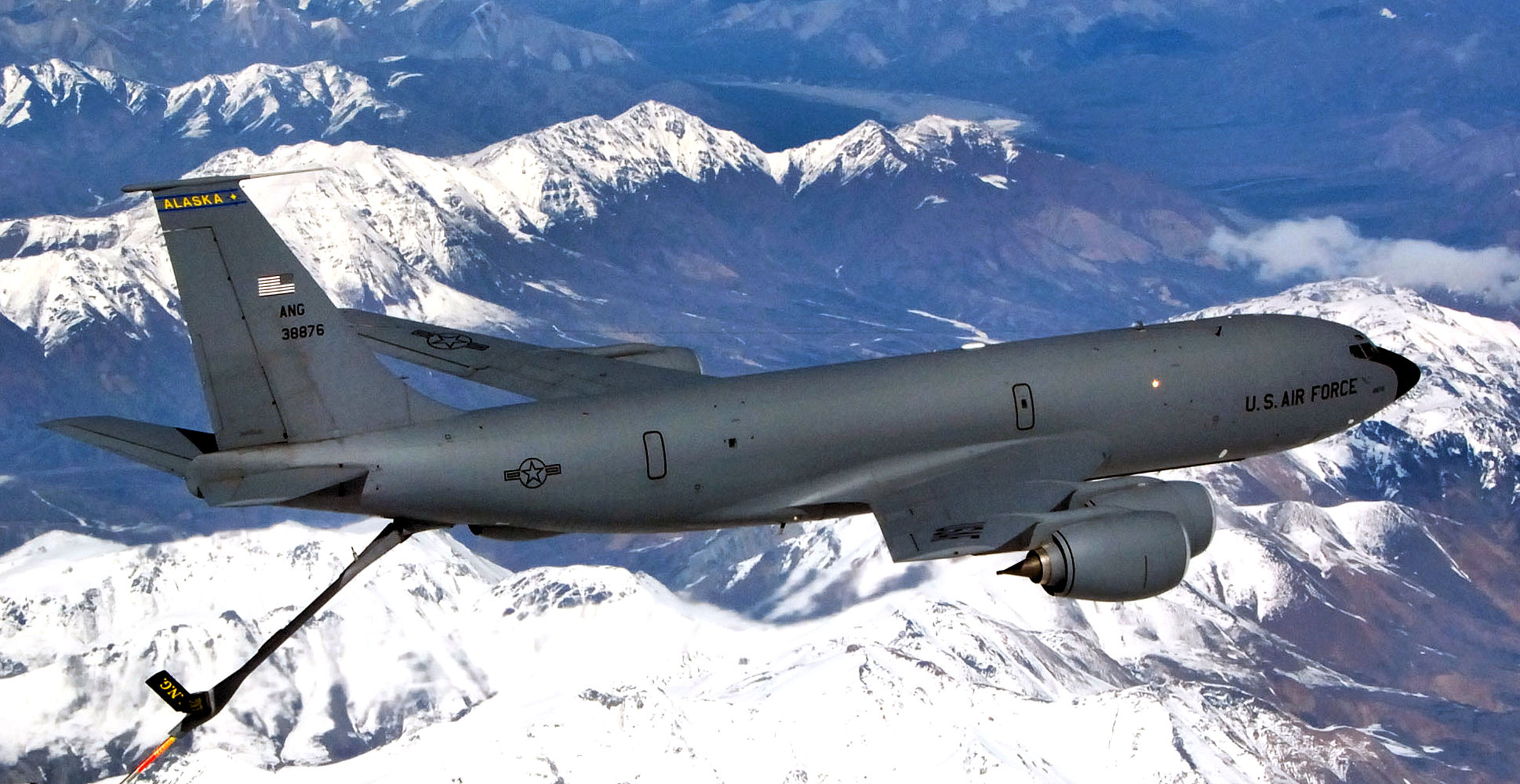
- 168th Air Refueling Squadron – Boeing KC-135R Stratotanker 63-8876
- Active: 1942–1946; 1947–1953; 1953–1968; 1986–present
- Country: United States
- Allegiance: Alaska
- Branch: Air National Guard
- Type: Squadron
- Role: Aerial refueling
- Part of: Alaska Air National Guard
- Garrison/HQ: Eielson Air Force Base, Fairbanks, Alaska
- Nickname: Chena
- Engagements: Mediterranean Theater of Operations; Pacific Ocean Theater of World War II
- Decorations: Distinguished Unit Citation; French Croix de Guerre with Palm

Commanders
- Current commander: Lt Colonel Dean Thibodeau

Insignia
- 168th Air Refueling Squadron emblem

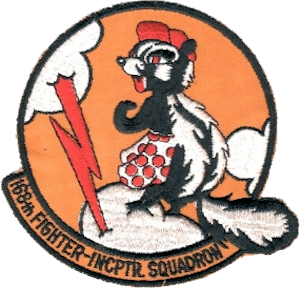
- 168th Fighter-Interceptor Squadron emblem

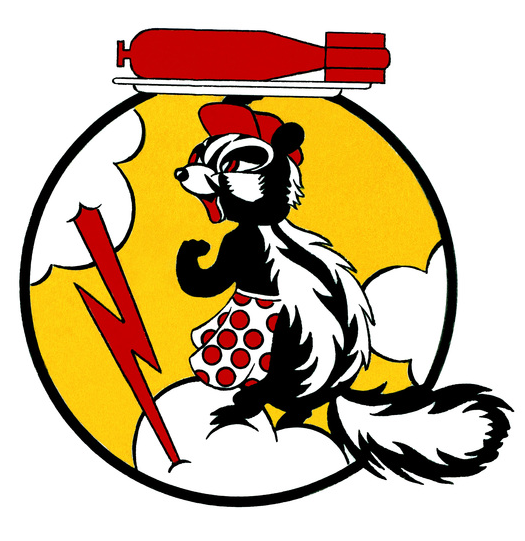
- 168th Fighter-Bomber Squadron emblem (Note: The insignia of the 168th Bombardment Squadron depicted a skunk wearing a red baseball cap and red and white apron. The skunk stood on a cloud and served a bomb on a tray. The skunk was patterned after the Disney character "Flower" from the film Bambi. but was known as "Sweet Willie" in honor of the first 168th commander, Lieutenant Colonel William Chum. The skunk represents "defiance". The 168th was activated in Chicago, and the word "Chicago" is a French rendering of the native Miami-Illinois name for Allium tricoccum. The skunk's baseball cap is a replica of those worn by the aircrew of the squadron.)

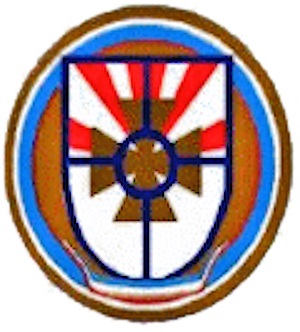
- Unofficial 437th Bombardment Squadron emblem
- Tail Stripe: Blue tail stripe "Alaska" in yellow

The 168th Air Refueling Squadron is a unit of the Alaska Air National Guard's 168th Air Refueling Wing stationed at Eielson Air Force Base, Fairbanks, Alaska. The 168th has been equipped with various models of the Boeing KC-135 Stratotanker since activating in 1986.

The squadron was first activated in June 1942 as the 437th Bombardment Squadron and equipped with the Martin B-26 Marauder. After training in the United States, it deployed to the Mediterranean Theater of Operations, where its actions in combat earned it two Distinguished Unit Citation and a French Croix de Guerre with Palm. In late 1944, it was withdrawn from combat operations and returned to the United States, where it converted to the Douglas A-26 Invader. It moved to Okinawa, where it engaged in combat against Japan. Following V-J Day, the squadron returned to the United States and was inactivated.

In 1946, the squadron was allotted to the National Guard and redesignated the 168th Bombardment Squadron. It activated in Illinois and was again iequipped with the Invader, which was called the B-26 after 1948. In 1951, the squadron was called to active duty. It moved to France and supported North Atlantic Treaty Organization operations until January 1953, when it transferred its personnel and equipment to a regular Air Force Unit and was inactivated and returned to state control. It was active in Illinois as a fighter squadron until 1958, when it was again inactivated and withdrawn from the Guard. It remained inactive until 1986, when it was allotted to the Alaska Air Guard.

== Mission ==
The mission of the squadron is to train and equip Boeing KC-135R Stratotanker combat crews to provide air refueling in support of Pacific Air Forces (PACAF) Operations Plans and worldwide refueling taskings. It provides air refueling training and exercise support for all Eleventh Air Force Airborne Warning and Control System and fighter aircraft. It maintains tankers and crews on alert to support Alaska NORAD Region plans and Joint Chiefs of Staff directed refueling requirements. Besides federally directed missions, the squadron is an asset of the Governor of Alaska and responds to emergencies or missions required within Alaska.

The 168th transfers more fuel than any other Air National Guard tanker unit, because nearly all receivers are active duty aircraft, many of which are on operational missions. The 168th is the only Arctic region refueling unit for all of PACAF, and maintains a substantial number of personnel on active duty and civilian technician status in order to meet its daily operational requirements.

== History ==
=== World War II ===
==== Organization and preparation for combat ====
The squadron was first activated on 26 June 1942 at Barksdale Field, Louisiana, as the 437th Bombardment Squadron, one of the four original squadrons of the 319th Bombardment Group. a Martin B-26 Marauder medium bombardment group. The squadron trained for combat at Barksdale and Harding Field, in Louisiana. The air echelon began ferrying its aircraft to England via the North Atlantic route on 27 August 1942, with the squadron officially moving to RAF Shipdham on 12 September 1942. By late October to early November, (Note: The 319th Group suffered several losses on the ferry flight, as winter weather began to impact the northern ferry route. Other planes were delayed for weather of aircraft malfunctions. As a result, further deployments of B-26 units to Europe travelled over the South Atlantic route, Freeman, pp. 15, 55.) squadron aircraft were in place at RAF Horsham St Faith. The ground echelon sailed on the RMS Queen Mary on 5 September.

==== Mediterranean Theater of Operations ====
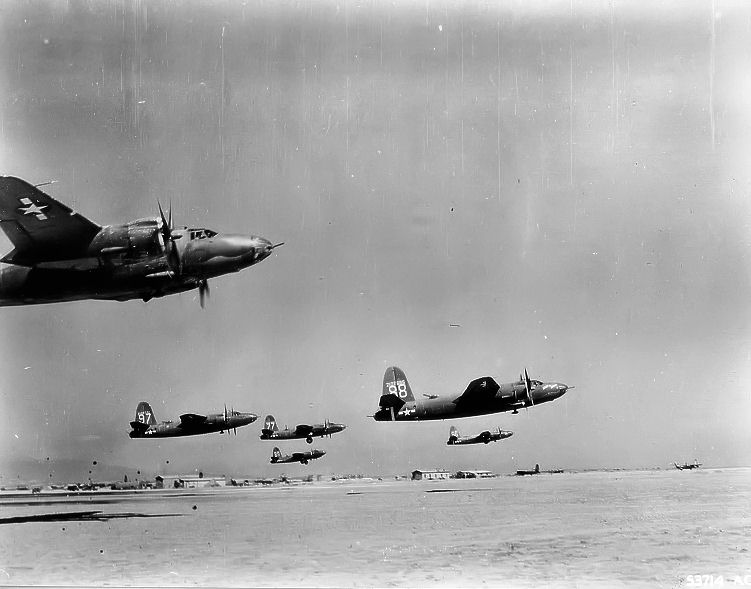
Formation of 319th Bombardment Group B-26s taking off

The air echelon of the squadron departed England on 12 November 1942 for Saint-Leu Airfield, Algeria. Although this was supposed to be a simple repositioning flight, it became the squadron's introduction to combat when the 319th Group formation strayed from its planned route and flew over occupied France, where they were attacked by German aircraft. Some of the ground echelon had made the amphibious landing at Arzeu beach on 8 November. However, it was not until the following March that all aircraft had made the move to North Africa.

The squadron began combat quickly, flying its first sorties during November. Until March 1943, it made strikes at enemy targets in Tunisia, including railroads, airfields, and harbor installations. It struck enemy shipping in the Mediterranean Sea to block reinforcements and supplies from reaching opposing Axis forces.

In March 1943, the squadron was withdrawn from combat and moved to Oujda Airfield, French Morocco for a period of reorganization and training. On 1 June, it moved forward to Sedrata Airfield, Algeria and resumed combat operations. It participated in Operation Corkscrew, the reduction of Pantelleria, that month. The following month it provided air support for Operation Husky, the invasion of Sicily. After Sicily fell, it directed most of its attacks on targets in Italy. It supported Operation Avalanche, the invasion of Italy, in September. These operations concentrated on airfields, marshalling yards airfields, viaducts, gun sites and other defense positions. In November, it moved from Africa to Decimomannu Airfield, Sardinia to shorten the range to targets in central Italy.

From January to March 1944, the squadron supported Allied ground forces as they advanced in the Battle of Monte Cassino and Operation Shingle, the landings at Anzio. As ground forces approached Rome, it flew interdiction missions. On 3 March 1944, the squadron earned a Distinguished Unit Citation (DUC) for an attack on rail facilities in Rome, while carefully avoiding damage to religious and cultural monuments. Eight days later, it earned a second DUC for an attack on marshalling yards in Florence, disrupting communications between Florence and Rome. Its support of French forces between April and June earned the squadron the French Croix de Guerre with Palm.

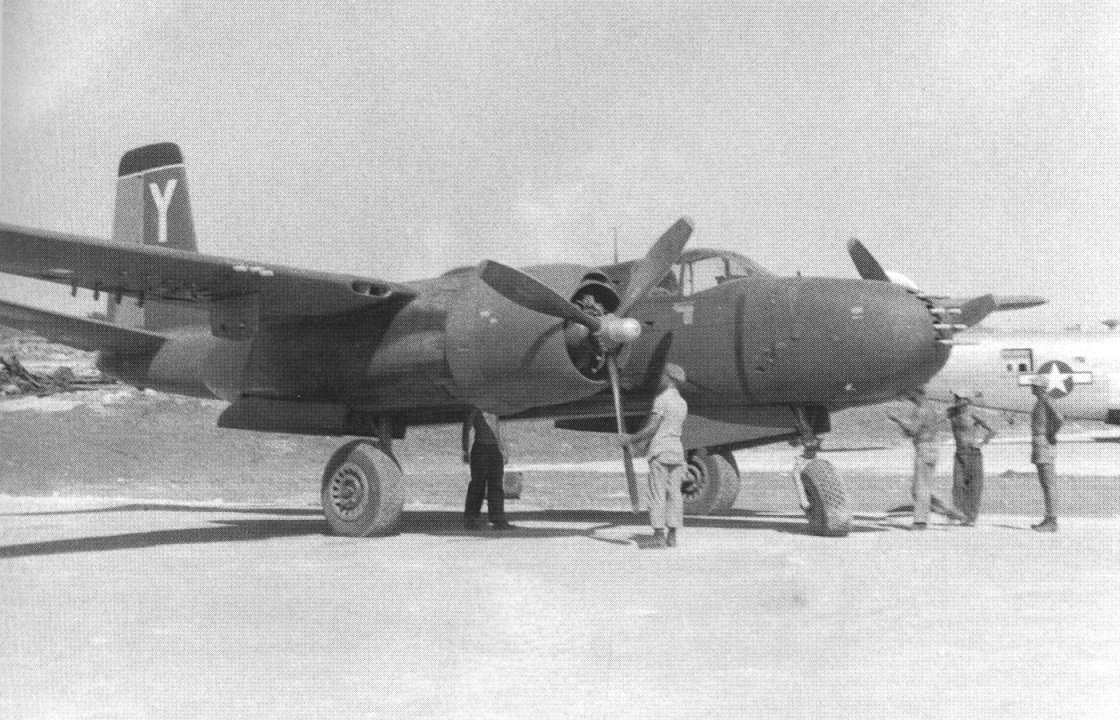
A-26 at Machinato Airfield in 1945

In August and September 1944, the squadron supported Operation Dragoon, the invasion of southern France, moving forward to Serragia Airfield, Corsica the following month. It attacked German supply lines in northern Italy, including bombing bridges over the Po River. It also attacked some targets in Yugoslavia. It continued combat operations while transitioning into the North American B-25 Mitchell from its Marauders. At the end of the year, the squadron was withdrawn from combat and returned to the United States in January 1945 to begin training with the Douglas A-26 Invader in preparation for deployment to the Western Pacific.

==== Combat in the Pacific ====
The squadron completed its training in the new bomber and departed to reenter combat in April 1945. It arrived on Okinawa in early July and was established at Machinato Airfield later that month. It flew its first mission in the Pacific on 16 July 1945. It flew missions in China and Japan, attacking airfields, shipping, marshalling yards, industrial centers and other targets until V-J Day. It was briefly assigned to VII Bomber Command when the 319th departed Okinawa on 21 November 1945. The squadron left in December, and was inactivated at the Port of Embarkation on 6 January 1946.

=== Illinois Air National Guard ===
The 437th Bombardment Squadron was redesignated the 168th Bombardment Squadron, and allotted to the National Guard, on 24 May 1946. It was organized at Orchard Place Airport, Chicago, Illinois, and was extended federal recognition on 19 October 1947 by the National Guard Bureau. The squadron was equipped with Douglas A-26 Invaders (Note: After 1948, the Invader became the B-26.) and was assigned to the 126th Bombardment Group, operationally gained by Tactical Air Command.

==== Korean War activation ====
On 1 April 1951 the 168th was federalized and brought to active duty due to the Korean War, and moved to Langley Air Force Base, Virginia. At Langley, the 168th Bombardment Squadron remained assigned to the 126th Bombardment Group, which had also been called to active duty. The 126th Group consisted of the 168th, along with the 108th, 115th and the 180th Bombardment Squadrons from the Illinois, California and Missouri Air National Guard, although the 115th was soon reassigned to another wing. The aircraft were marked by various color bands on the vertical stabilizer and rudder. Black/Yellow/Blue for the 108th; Black/Yellow/Red for the 168th, and Black/Yellow/Green for the 180th. On active duty, the 126th Group completed its reorganization under the Wing Base organization system as part of the 126th Bombardment Wing. The squadron trained intensively for combat operations, but instead of being sent to reinforce Far East Air Forces, it was ordered to France to augment the forces of the North Atlantic Treaty Organization. the squadron was to be stationed at Laon-Couvron Air Base, France, but Laon was not ready to receive a combat wing, so the unit was initially stationed at Bordeaux-Mérignac Air Base, France.

The squadron's air echelon was the last in the 126th Wing to leave for France, taking off from Langley on 2 November. During its flight across the North Atlantic, it was accompanied by a pair of Douglas C-47 Skytrains to provide communications support. The ground echelon sailed for France aboard the USS General H. F. Hodges.

Bordeaux had minimal facilities to support the squadron. Personnel were quartered in tents, and aircraft maintenance had to be performed outdoors due to lack of hangars. (Note: Hangars on the base had been bombed and since the base was unused after World War II, never repaired. McAuliffe, p. 149.) Early operations included flights to German bases for radar calibration and exercises with fighter interceptors. In February 1952 the squadron deployed to a French Air Force station to participate in Operation Grand Slam. When the squadron was mobilized, Tactical Air Command decided that the turret system on the B-26 Invader was obsolete. It grounded the squadron's experienced gunners and transferred them to other units. In November 1951, as the squadron arrived in France, this determination was reversed, and the squadron began to receive untrained airmen as gunners, The squadron improved its gunner's proficiency especially in January and February 1952 through its participation in Operation Vampire, a combined air to air gunnery exercise with French de Havilland Vampires.

Squadron enlisted strength was depleted by about 60% by a Headquarters, United States Air Force (USAF) early release program, that affected ANG airmen. Those whose enlistments would expire later in the year, World War II veterans, and "non-essential" personnel were all released from active duty by April. This problem could have been worse, but while reorganizing at Langley, about 25% of the squadron were assigned from the regular Air Force.

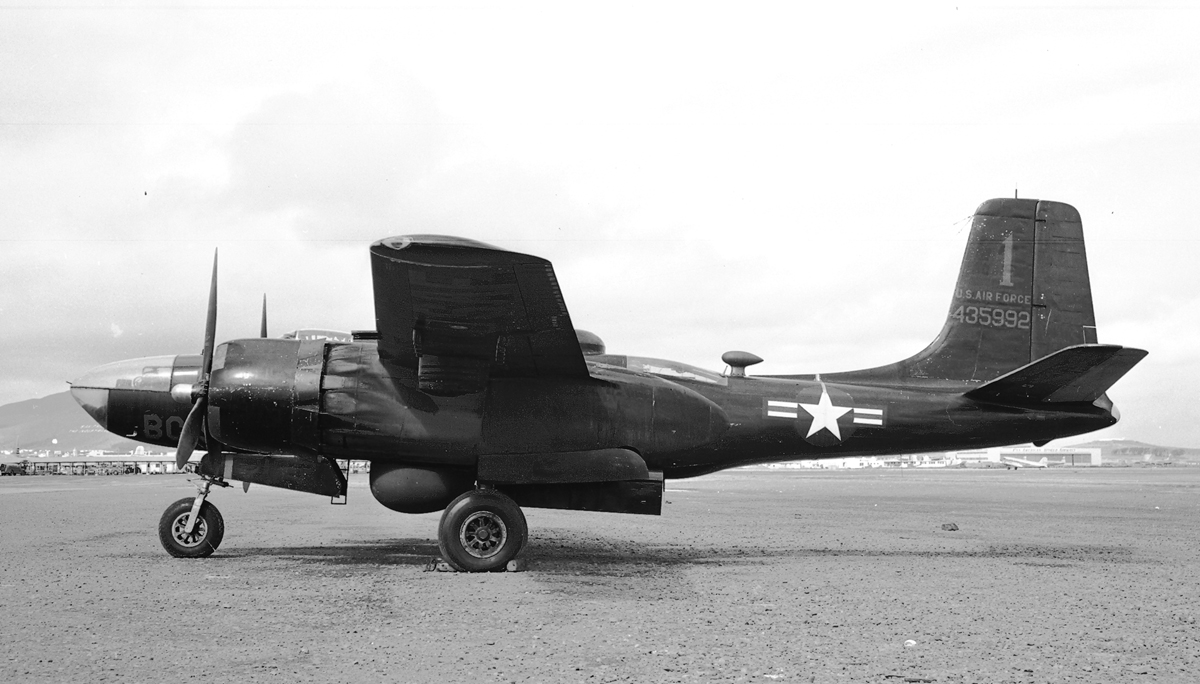
B-26C in night intruder camouflage

In February 1952, USAF transferred 40 B-26s to the French Air Force and the 126th Wing was charged with the initial training of three to six crews per month. Starting in April 1952, the squadron was tasked to support USAF Project 7109. Under this project, it deployed crews to Korea for 90 day temporary duty. This project provided the unit with a cadre of experienced combat crews, and helped alleviate a shortage of crews in combat. The squadron continued to support his program until it was inactivated and returned to the National Guard.

In May 1952, the squadron moved to its intended base, Laon-Couvron Air Base, whose runway had been completed in March. The squadron was not combat capable during its stay at Bordeaux, for the base lacked bombs, bomb loading vehicles and rockets. Base construction continued at Laon during the squadron's stay there Manning problems continued after the squadron move. By 1 August, all officer aircrew were from the regular Air Force. At Laon, the squadron began bombing and rocketry training in addition to the gunnery training. It participated in close air support exercises with various NATO allies. On 2 November, the squadron lost two B-26s during NATO exercise in Italy.

In September, the squadron was designated as being combat ready. However, the squadron had begun receiving black painted B-26Cs from the depot starting in the spring of 1952. In the fall, it began training on the night intruder mission. and its mission was officially changed to nighttime operations in November. All enlisted members of the Air National Guard were released from active duty on 2 December. on 1 January 1953, the squadron was relieved from active duty and its mission, personnel, and equipment were transferred to the 405th Bombardment Squadron, which was simultaneously activated. A few ANG officers remained on active duty for as much as six months.

==== Return to the Illinois Air National Guard ====
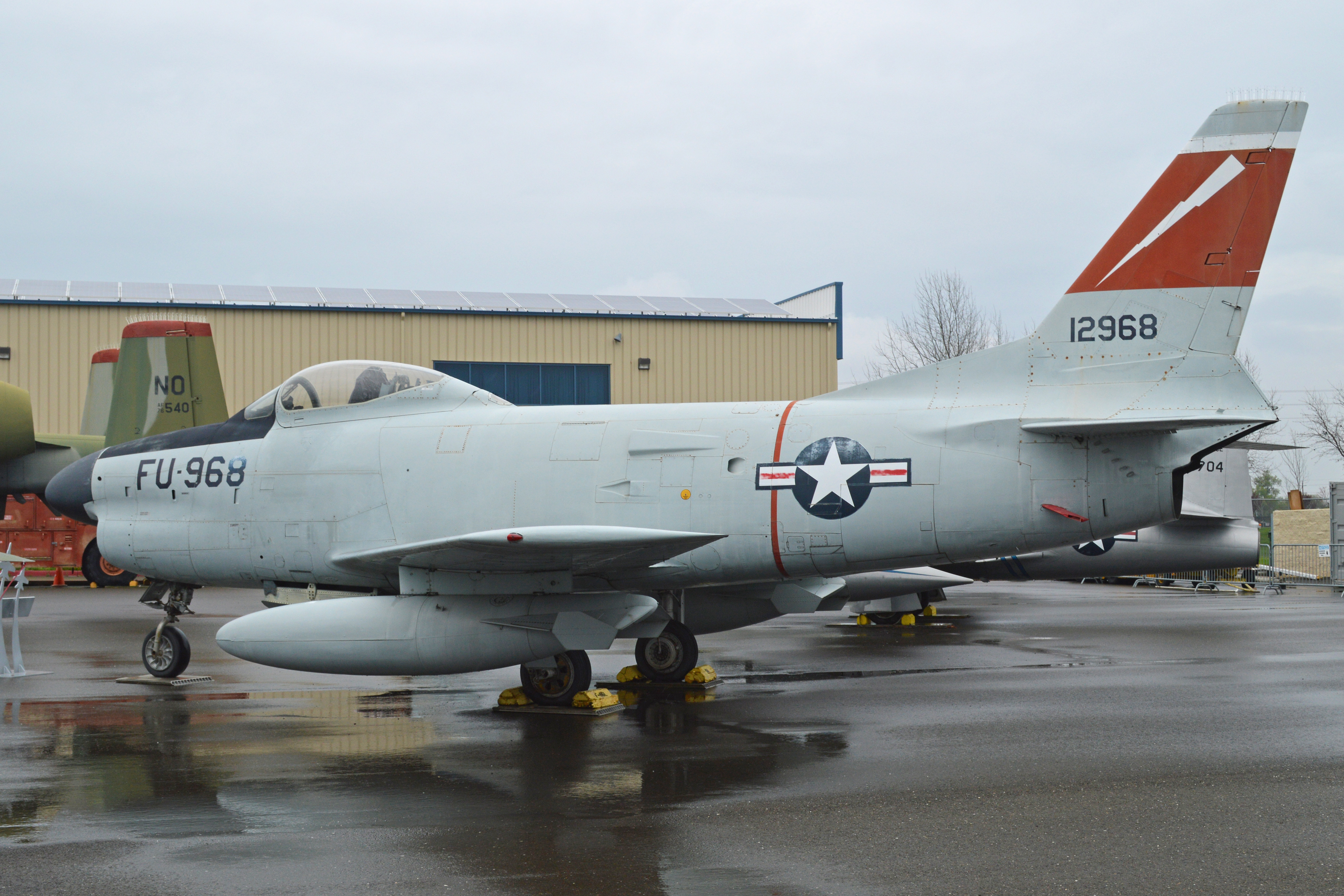
F-86L Sabre as flown by the 168th Fighter-Interceptor Squadron

On returning to the National Guard, the squadron's mission changed, and it became the 168th Fighter-Bomber Squadron. In the spring, it began to equip with North American F-51D Mustangs due to the limited availability of jets which were being used by the USAF in the Korean War. Despite its designation as a fighter bomber unit, its mission was to augment the air defense of the United States. This was recognized in 1955, when the unit designation changed to 168th Fighter-Interceptor Squadron. That same year the squadron received it first jets, transitioning into the Republic F-84F Thunderstreak. In 1957, the Thunderstreaks began to be replaced by true interceptors, North American F-86L Sabres, which were armed with FFAR rocket and equipped with data link for interception control through the Semi-Automatic Ground Environment system. However, even as the re-equipping of the squadron was taking place, the decision was made to inactivate the squadron. It was inactivated on 31 May 1958 and withdrawn from the Air National Guard, with its aircraft and personnel transferred to other units.

=== Alaska Air National Guard ===
In 1986 the squadron was transferred to the Alaska Air National Guard. It was redesignated the 168th Air Refueling Squadron, extended federal recognition and activated on 1 October 1986. The squadron took over the personnel and equipment of Detachment 1, 176th Tactical Airlift Group, which had been formed at Eielson Air Force Base, Alaska in the spring of 1986 to form a tanker unit from the ground up. In September, the detachment received its first aircraft, four Boeing KC-135E Stratotankers that were transferred from the Arkansas Air National Guard

The squadron was assigned to the Alaska Air National Guard's 176th Composite Group, (Note: The group was redesignated when the squadron was assigned.) which was stationed at Elmendorf Air Force Base. It was equipped with Detachment 1's Stratotankers and assumed an air refueling mission. The first commanding officer of the squadron was Lt Col. William "Doug" Clinton. The first rendezvous and refueling of the squadron occurred just weeks after the arrival of the first aircraft. The pilot in command was Lt Col Tom Gresch and the navigator conducting the rendezvous was Capt Michael R. Stack, formerly of the 126th Air Refueling Wing. For the next four years the squadron would provide air refueling support for the 6th Strategic Wing and all other tactical and strategic units in Alaska and PACAF. In addition, because of Alaska's strategic geographical location, the 168th supported air refueling operations for United States Air Forces in Europe.

On 1 July 1990, the 168th was authorized to expand to a group level, and the 168th Air Refueling Group was established. The 168th Squadron becoming the group's flying squadron. It also changed equipment to the KC-135D Stratotanker. In 1992, the 168th Group was reorganized under the Objective Wing concept. The group became a wing, the 168th Air Refueling Squadron being assigned to the new 168th Operations Group.

== Lineage ==
- Constituted as the 437th Bombardment Squadron (Medium) on 19 June 1942

Activated on 26 June 1942
Redesignated 437th Bombardment Squadron, Medium c. 1944
Redesignated 437th Bombardment Squadron, Light on 3 February 1945
Inactivated on 4 January 1946

- Redesignated 168th Bombardment Squadron, Light and allotted to the National Guard on 24 May 1946

Activated on 21 August 1947
Extended federal recognition on 19 October 1947
Federalized and ordered to active service on 1 April 1951
Released from active service, returned to state control and redesignated 168th Fighter-Bomber Squadron on 1 January 1953
Activated c. 1 May 1953
Redesignated 168th Fighter-Interceptor Squadron on 1 July 1955
Inactivated on 31 May 1958

- Withdrawn from the Illinois Air National Guard and allotted to the Alaska Air National Guard, 1986

Redesignated 168th Air Refueling Squadron, Heavy on 1 October 1986
Activated and extended federal recognition on 25 October 1986
Redesignated 168th Air Refueling Squadron on 15 March 1992

=== Assignments ===
- 319th Bombardment Group, 26 June 1942
- VII Bomber Command, 18 December 1945 – 4 January 1946
- 126th Bombardment Group (later 126th Composite Group, 126th Bombardment Group), 19 October 1947 – 1 January 1953
- 126th Fighter-Bomber Group (later 126th Fighter-Interceptor Group), 1 January 1953 – 31 May 1958
- Alaska Air National Guard, 1 October 1986
- 176th Composite Group, 25 October 1986
- 168th Air Refueling Group, 23 October 1990
- 168th Operations Group, 1 June 1992 – present

=== Stations ===
- Barksdale Field, Louisiana, 26 June 1942
- Harding Field, Louisiana, 8–27 August 1942
- RAF Shipdham (Station 115), England, 12 September 1942
- RAF Horsham St Faith (Station 123), England, c. 4 October 1942
- Saint-Leu Airfield, Algeria, c. 10 November 1942
- Oran Tafaraoui Airport, Algeria, 17 November 1942
- Maison Blanche Airport, Algeria, c. 26 November 1942
- Telergma Airfield, Algeria, c. 13 December 1942
- Oujda Airfield, French Morocco, 3 March 1943
- Rabat-Salé Airport, French Morocco, 25 April 1943
- Sedrata Airfield, Algeria, 1 June 1943
- Djedeida Airfield, Tunisia, c. 26 June 1943
- Decimomannu Airfield, Sardinia, 1 November 1943
- Serragia Airfield, Corsica, c. 20 September 1944 – 8 January 1945
- Bradley Field, Connecticut, 25 January 1945
- Columbia Army Air Base, South Carolina, c. 28 February – 27 April 1945
- Kadena Airfield, Okinawa, 2 July 1945
- Machinato Airfield, Okinawa, 21 July – 8 December 1945
- Fort Lawton, Washington, 2–3 January 1946
- Orchard Place Airport (Later O’Hare International Airport), Illinois, 19 October 1947
- Langley Air Force Base, Virginia, c. 25 July 1951 – c. 19 November 1951
- Bordeaux-Mérignac Air Base, France, November 1951
- Laon-Couvron Air Base, France, c. 25 May 1952 – 1 January 1953
- O’Hare International Airport, Illinois, c. 1 May 1953 – 31 May 1958
- Eielson Air Force Base, Alaska, 1 October 1986 – present

=== Aircraft ===
- Martin B-26 Marauder, 1942–1944
- North American B-25 Mitchell, 1944–1945
- Douglas A-26 (after 1948, B-26) Invader, 1945–1946, 1947–1953
- North American F-51D Mustang, 1953–1955
- Republic F-84F Thunderstreak, 1955–1957
- North American F-86L Sabre, 1957–1958
- Boeing KC-135E Stratotanker, 1986–1990
- Boeing KC-135D Stratotanker, 1990–1995
- Boeing KC-135R Stratotanker, 1995–present

=== Awards and campaigns ===
Award streamer	Award	Dates	Notes
	Distinguished Unit Citation	3 March 1944	Rome, Italy, 437th Bombardment Squadron
	Distinguished Unit Citation	11 March 1944	Florence, Italy, 437th Bombardment Squadron
	Air Force Outstanding Unit Award	1 June 1986 [sic]–31 May 1987	168th Air Refueling Squadron
	Air Force Outstanding Unit Award	8 January 1991–7 January 1993	168th Air Refueling Squadron
	French Croix de Guerre with Palm	April, May and June 1944	437th Bombardment Squadron

Campaign Streamer	Campaign	Dates	Notes
	Air Combat, EAME Theater	12 September 1942 – 8 January 1945	437th Bombardment Squadron
	Algeria-French Morocco (with Arrowhead)	8 November 1942 – 11 November 1942	437th Bombardment Squadron
	Tunisia	12 November 1942 – 13 May 1943	437th Bombardment Squadron
	Sicily	14 May 1943 – 17 August 1943	437th Bombardment Squadron
	Naples-Foggia	18 August 1943 – 21 January 1944	437th Bombardment Squadron
	Anzio	22 January 1944 – 24 May 1944	437th Bombardment Squadron
	Rome-Arno	22 January 1944 – 9 September 1944	437th Bombardment Squadron
	Southern France	15 August 1944 – 14 September 1944	437th Bombardment Squadron
	North Apennines	10 September 1944 – 8 January 1945	437th Bombardment Squadron
	Air Offensive, Japan	2 July 1945 – 2 September 1945	437th Bombardment Squadron
	Ryukus	2 July 1945	437th Bombardment Squadron
	China Offensive	2 Jul 1945–2 September 1945	437th Bombardment Squadron

== See also ==
- List of Martin B-26 Marauder operators
- List of A-26 Invader operators
- List of F-86 Sabre units
