= 168th Wing =

Alaska Air National Guard unit

168th Wing

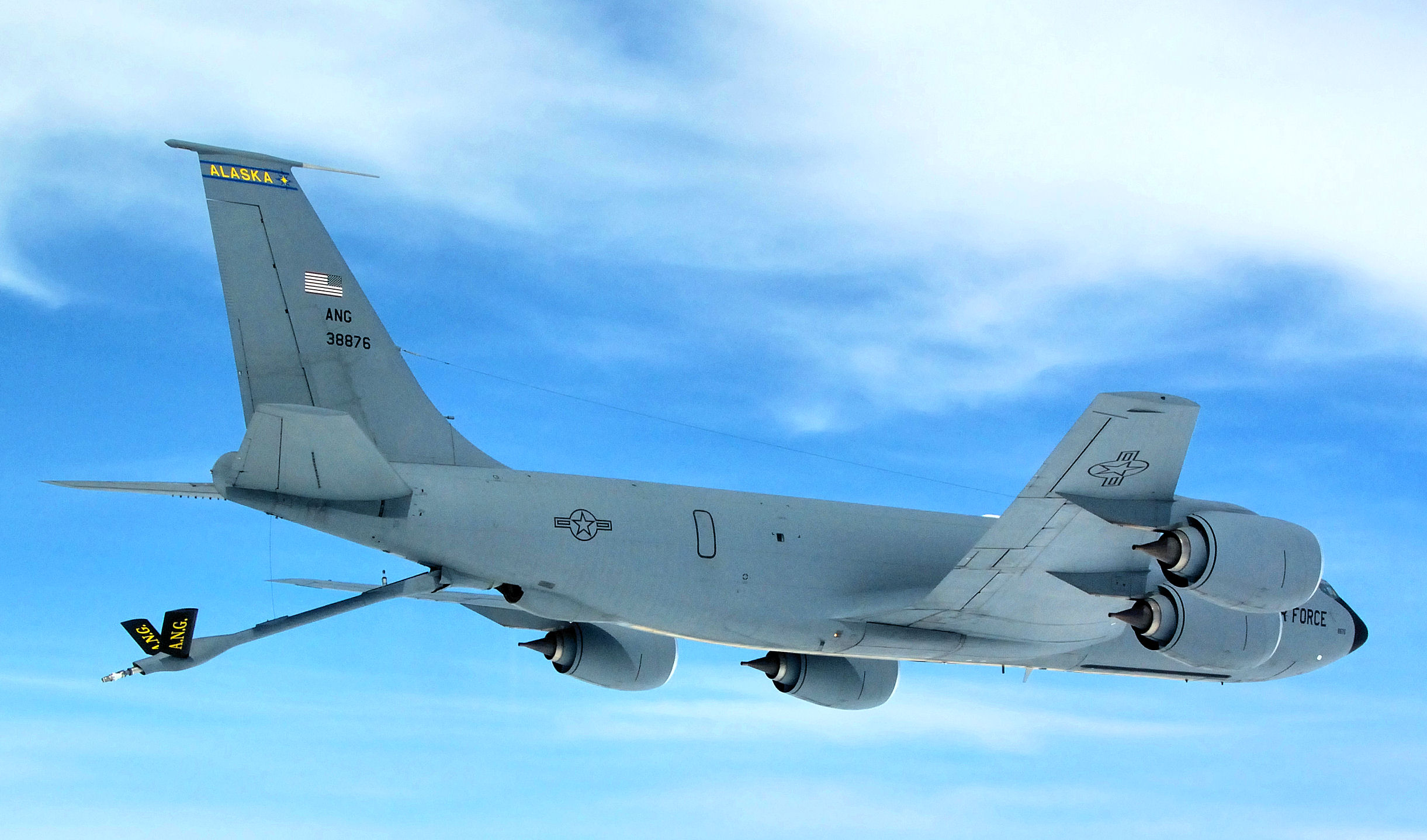
- 168th Air Refueling Squadron KC-135R Stratotanker
- Active: 1964–1967; 1990–present
- Country: United States
- Allegiance: Alaska
- Branch: Air National Guard
- Type: Wing
- Role: Aerial refueling, missile warning, and space surveillance
- Part of: Alaska Air National Guard
- Garrison/HQ: Eielson Air Force Base, Alaska
- Motto: Guardians of the Last Frontier
- Decorations: Air Force Outstanding Unit Award (1994, 1996, 2004); Distinguished Flying Unit Plaque (1996, 1997); Curtis N. "Rusty" Metcalf Trophy (1997)

Commanders
- Current commander: Colonel Benjamin A. Doyle

Insignia
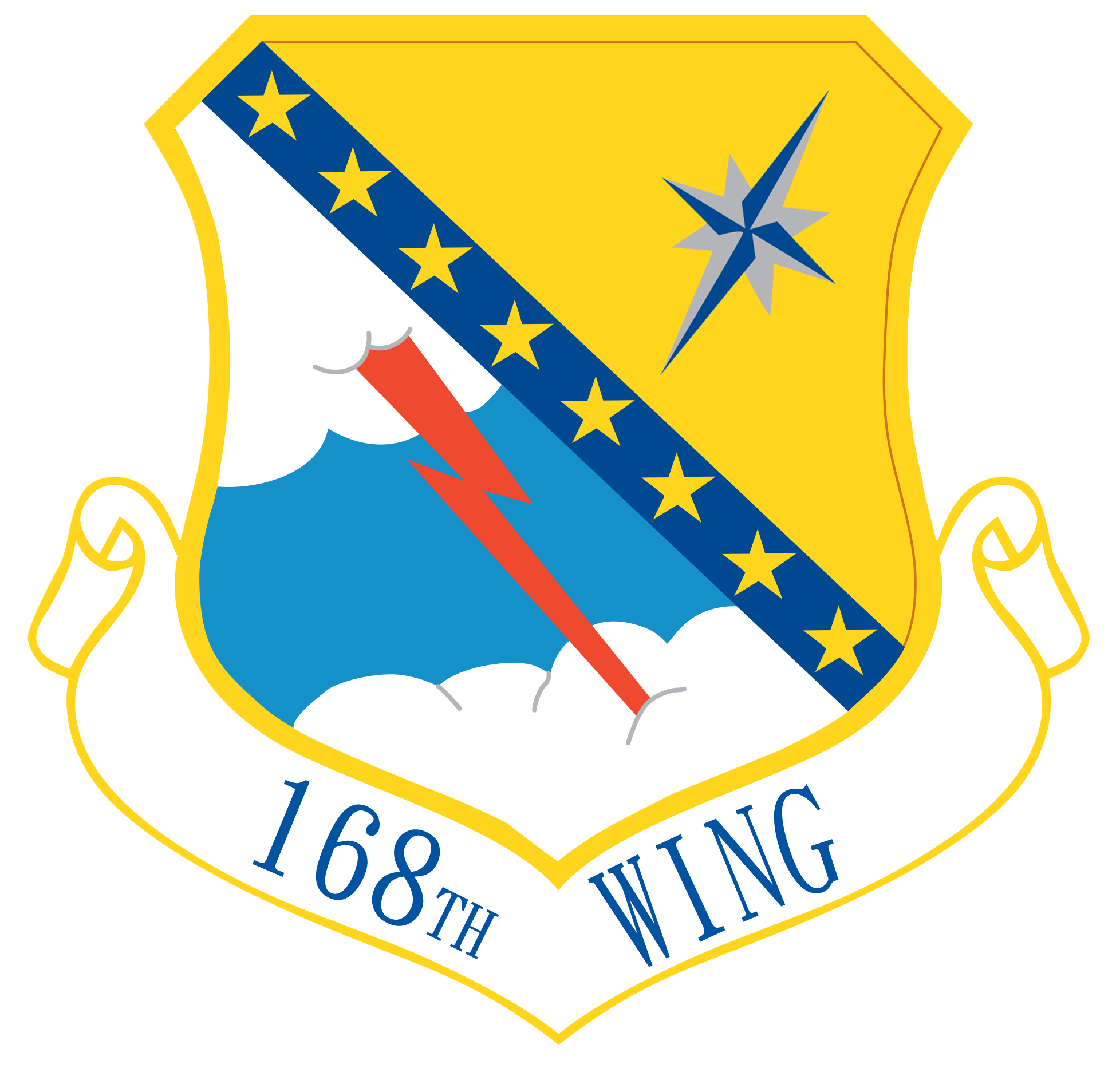
- 168th Wing emblem (Note: The upper right of the shield consists of a compass rose against a yellow background. The compass rose signifies the global nature of the wing mission and is set at a 30-degree angle to the east representing the magnetic variation of Alaska. The yellow background represents the midnight sun at high latitude and the day aspect of the air refueling mission. The lower left of the shield depicts a red lightning bolt running from cloud to cloud against a blue background. The red lightning bolt signifies the projection of military power, the clouds are the medium in which it performs its mission, and the blue background the Arctic night and the night aspect of its mission. The red lightning bolt is also a prominent feature of the squadron patch from which the 168th Wing evolved. Between the yellow and blue fields is a bar of ultramarine blue containing eight yellow stars. The ultramarine blue is Air Force blue representing the 168th Wing's role in the Total force policy; it is also the background color of the Flag of Alaska. The eight yellow stars are the stars of the big dipper also found on the Alaska flag.)

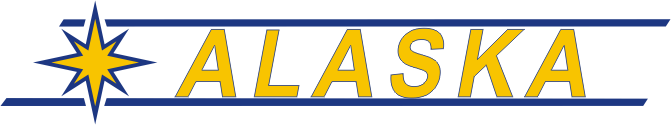
- Tail stripe

The 168th Wing is a unit of the Alaska Air National Guard, stationed at Eielson Air Force Base, Alaska. Before it was redesignated in February 2016, it was known as the 168th Air Refueling Wing. If activated to federal service as a USAF unit, the 168th is primarily gained by Pacific Air Forces, while its 213th Space Warning Squadron is gained by Space Force.

From 1964 to 1967, the wing was an airlift unit of the Pennsylvania Air National Guard, flying Lockheed C-121 Constellations as the 168th Air Transport Group (later 168th Military Airlift Group). It was inactivated when the Pennsylvania mission changed to psychological warfare. It was reactivated in Alaska in 1990.

== Mission ==
The 168th Wing provides combined operations of air refueling, missile warning, and space surveillance. The unit supports for Pacific Air Forces, U.S. Northern Command, Space Force and the Alaskan North American Aerospace Defense Command Region. Besides its federally directed missions, as a unit of the Alaska National Guard, the 168th Wing is an asset of the Governor of Alaska, who can direct the unit to respond to emergencies declared or missions required within the state. The wing is the only Arctic region air refueling unit in the United States. The unit transfers more fuel than any other Air National Guard tanker wing, because nearly all receivers are active duty aircraft, many of which are on operational missions.

== Units ==
The 168th Wing consists of the following units:

- 168th Operations Group
  - 168th Air Refueling Squadron
  - 168th Operations Support Flight
- 168th Maintenance Group
  - 168th Aircraft Maintenance Squadron
  - 168th Maintenance Squadron
  - 168th Maintenance Operations Flight
- 168th Mission Support Group
  - 168th Communications Flight
  - 168th Logistics Readiness Squadron
  - 168th Mission Support Flight
  - 168th Security Forces Squadron
  - 168th Civil Engineer Squadron
- 168th Medical Group
- 213th Space Warning Squadron, located at Clear Air Force Station, Alaska

== History ==
=== Pennsylvania Air National Guard ===
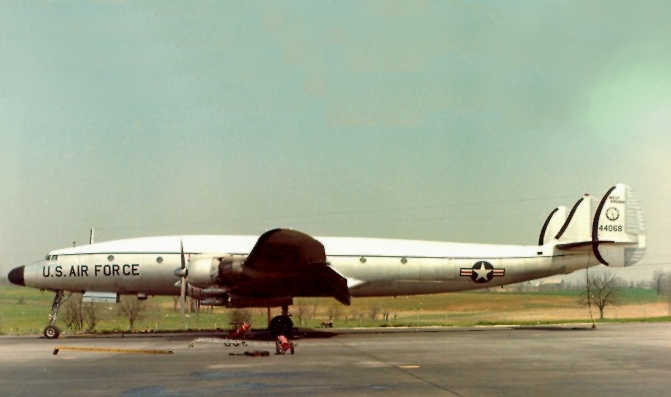
C-121 Constellation of the Air National Guard (Note: Aircraft is Lockheed C-121G-LO Constellation, serial 54-4068.)

Since 1950, the Air National Guard had been organized into wings, self-sustaining organizations, made up of functional groups. Because it was not practical to put an entire wing on a single installation for day to day operations, wing squadrons were located on bases as “augmented squadrons” containing support elements needed to sustain operations. By the law at the time Guardsmen could only be activated as members of a mobilized unit. This meant that, even when only operational and maintenance elements were needed for mobilization, the entire “augmented squadron” had to be called to active duty, including unneeded administrative personnel. The response was to replace the “augmented squadron” with a group including functional squadrons that could be mobilized as a group, or individually.

In 1964, the 140th Air Transport Squadron at Olmsted Air Force Base was reorganized to form the 168th Air Transport Group. In addition to the 140th, units assigned into the group were the 168th Material Squadron, 168th Support Squadron, and the 168th USAF Dispensary. The group operated the Lockheed C-121 Constellation. In January 1966 the group became the 168th Military Airlift Group.

Following Operation Power Pack, the United States military intervention during the 1965 crisis in the Dominican Republic, (Note: The 193rd Special Operation Wing's web page attributes this interest to the 1967 Arab-Israeli conflict, but the program predates that war. van Geffan, p. 6.) Robert McNamara, the United States Secretary of Defense directed the Air Force to develop a capability to disrupt civilian broadcasting networks and guerilla command and control networks. In response, Tactical Air Command began to test a tactical electronic warfare support system that would be installed on C-121s, named Coronet Solo. Coronet Solo aircraft would be able to join or disrupt commercial radio and television and to broadcast prerecorded programs, in addition to having an electronic countermeasures capability.

Threatened by the closure of Olmsted (now Harrisburg Air National Guard Base) and by the downsizing of all conventionally powered transport aircraft, the National Guard Bureau volunteered the 168th for the Coronet Solo mission capability in 1967. The 168th and its components were inactivated and its resources were transferred to the new 193d Tactical Electronic Warfare Group, which was activated to perform the Coronet Solo mission.

=== Alaska Air National Guard ===
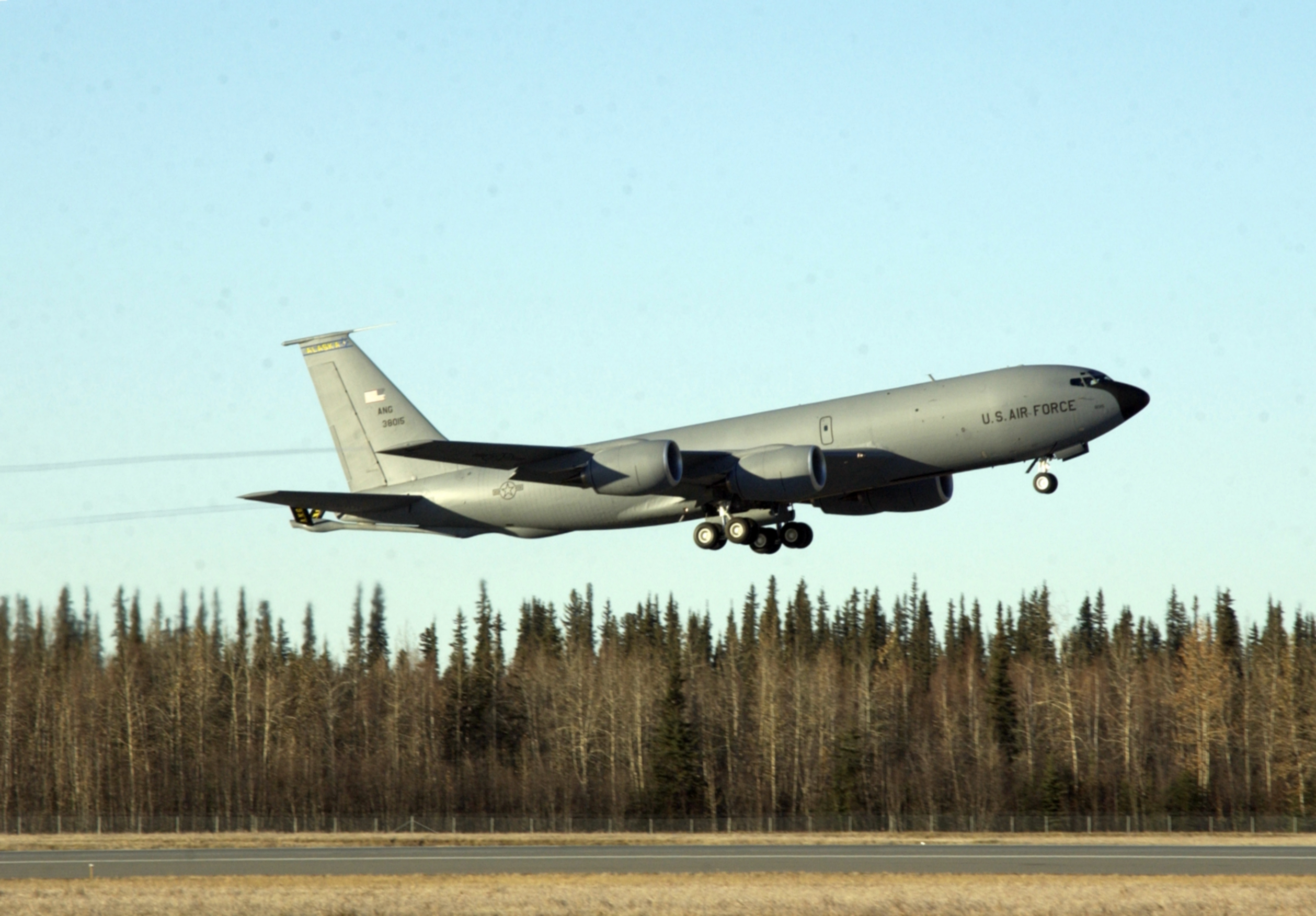
KC-135R of the 168th Wing

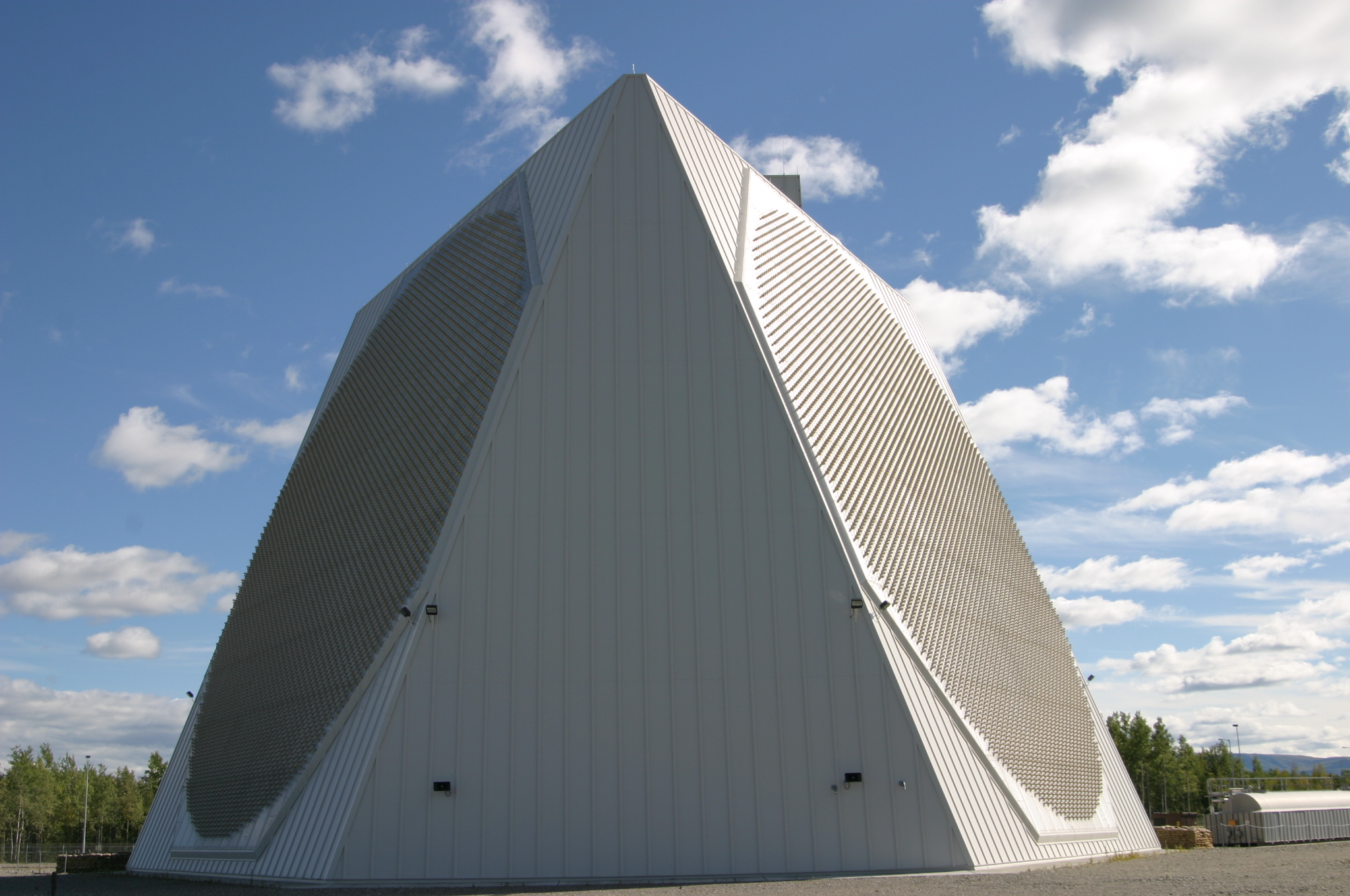
The 11-story tall Solid State Phased Array Radar System in its protective dome at Clear Air Force Station is operated by the 213th Space Warning Squadron.

The 168th Air Refueling Group (later the 168th AAir Refueling Wing) was activated on 23 October 1990 when the 168th Air Refueling Squadron was expanded to a group level. In 1995, the wing transitioned from the Boeing KC-135E Stratotanker to the KC-135R.

The 168th has thirteen subordinate assigned units whose missions include all aircraft maintenance for the Pacific Air Forces gained tankers, providing financial, transportation, contracting, and base supply resources, communications, data processing and visual information functions, organizational security, and disaster preparedness and air base operability. They also contain all personnel activities such as training, equal employment opportunity and recruiting, and limited diagnostic and therapeutic service in general medicine, flight medicine, bioenvironmental, environmental, and dental services.

The unit was redesignated the 168th Wing in February 2016, recognizing the inclusion of the 213th Space Warning Squadron at Clear Air Force Station, Alaska. The squadron had been part of the wing since 2046 and the redesignation of the parent wing recognized the dual-mission sets of both air refueling and ballistic missile early warning that the wing now performed.

In 2000 the wing completed a major flight deck upgrade to its Stratotankers called Pacer CRAG. The same year, the wing became mobility-tasked.

Four years later, the wing added the 213th Space Warning Squadron, located 40 miles (64 km) north of Denali and 40 miles (64 km) south of Fairbanks. The 213th is responsible for providing tactical warning and attack assessment of a ballistic missile attack against the continental United States and southern Canada. Warning data from the unit is forwarded to the North American Aerospace Defense Command inside Cheyenne Mountain Air Force Station, Colorado. The squadron is also responsible for a portion of the Space Force's Space Surveillance System and assists in tracking more than 9,500 space objects currently in Earth's orbit.

In 2025, the United States Congress rejected the idea of forming a Space National Guard, to include units like the 213th. Instead, space related functions will be transferred to regular Space Force units.

=== Awards ===
- In January 1994, January 1996, and January 2004, the 168 ARW received the Air Force Outstanding Unit Award.
- In April 1996 and again in 1997, the 168 ARW won one of the five annual Distinguished Flying Unit Plaques sponsored by the National Guard Association of the United States.
- Also in 1997, the wing earned the Curtis N. "Rusty" Metcalf Trophy, awarded to the tactical/strategic airlift or air refueling flying unit demonstrating the highest standards of mission accomplishment over a sustained period each year.

== Lineage ==
- Established as the 168th Air Transport Group, Heavy and allotted to the Air National Guard on 16 December 1963

Activated on 15 March 1964
Redesignated 168th Military Airlift Group on 1 January 1966
Inactivated and withdrawn from the Air National Guard on 16 September 1967
Redesignated 168th Air Refueling Group and allotted to the Air National Guard in 1990
Activated and extended federal recognition on 23 October 1990
Redesignated 168th Air Refueling Wing on 1 June 1992
Redesignated 168th Wing on 3 February 2016

=== Assignments ===
- 171st Air Transport Wing (later 171st Military Airlift Wing), 15 March 1964 – 16 September 1967
- Alaska Air National Guard, 23 October 1990 – present

=== Gaining Commands ===
- Military Air Transport Service (later Military Airlift Command), 15 March 1964 – 16 September 1967
- Strategic Air Command, 23 October 1990 – 1 June 1992
- Pacific Air Forces, 1 June 1992 – present

=== Operational Components ===
- 140th Air Transport Squadron (later 140th Military Airlift Squadron), 15 March 1964 – 16 September 1967
- 168th Operations Group, 1 Jun 1992 – present
- 168th Air Refueling Squadron, 23 Oct 1990 – 1 June 1992
- 213th Space Warning Squadron, 21 May 2004 – present

=== Stations ===
- Olmsted Air Force Base (later Harrisburg Municipal Airport), 15 March 1964 – 16 September 1967
- Eielson Air Force Base, Alaska, 23 Oct 1990 – present

=== Aircraft ===
- Lockheed C-121 Constellation, 1964-1967
- Boeing KC-135D Stratotanker, 1990-1996
- KC-135E Stratotanker, 1990-1995
- KC-135R Stratotanker, 1995–present
