= Broken Mammoth =

Archeological site in the Tanana Valley

The excavation of the Broken Mammoth Site

Broken Mammoth, Alaska is an archeological site located in the Tanana River Valley, Alaska, in the United States. The site was occupied approximately 11,000 to 12,000 years ago (10,000 - 9,000 BC) making this one of the oldest known sites in Alaska. Charles E. Holmes discovered the site in 1989 and investigation of the site began in 1990 and excavations are ongoing to this day.

== Occupation ==
The Broken Mammoth site was occupied at least three separate times in its history, the last occupation occurring approximately 2,500 years ago. The oldest occupation of the site occurred between 11,000 and 12,000 years ago according to radiocarbon dating, making this one of the oldest sites in Alaska. It is possible that the site was occupied at approximately the same time as other Nenana complex sites in Alaska.

Features found at the site include hearths with charcoal dating to approximately 12,200 BP implying that some form of temporary occupation occurred which could include using the site as a temporary base. A small bone needle found at one of these hearths supports this theory. According to the Alaska Department of Natural Resources the evidence points to small camps, which served as headquarters for small hunting groups to operate seasonally. Activities that would have most likely occurred here include: manufacturing of tools and maintenance as well as food processing and skin working (as evident by the remains of a bone needle)

== Climate and resources ==
Early occupation of the Broken Mammoth had a setting similar to the lowland tundra with low vegetation, mostly shrubs and few trees. The regional pollen record provides evidence of shrubland with plant life including dwarf birch and willow.

After approximately 9,000 years this shrubland became woodland which supported spruce and alder trees. The faunal remains of a red squirrel and a porcupine date the process of forestation at slightly more than 9,500 years ago. Windier conditions reestablished at Broken Mammoth around 10,000 BP with loess accumulation accelerating until about 7800 B.P. After this time modern conditions stabilized after 5700 B.P.

The stratigraphy at Broken Mammoth is well preserved and is one of the primary factors that have helped establish the age of the site. The site consists of Aeolian sediments (sand and loess) overlying weathered bedrock of the Yukon-Tanana crystalline terrace. The deposits are divided in four units: A, B, C and D with the oldest layer being unit A. Unit A is composed of fine sand dating to approximately 12,000 B.P. Units B, C, and D are made up of Aeolian silt or loess. Unit B contains three different palaeosol complexes with B1 dating to 11,800 B.P. to 11,200 B.P, B2 dates to 10,300 B.P. to 9,300 B.P while there is no direct dating for B3. Unit C dates to sometime after 9,000 B.P with the final unit (Unit D) being an accumulation of silt deposits over the last 8,000 to 9,000 years.

The resources of the region were diverse and plentiful, with large mammals; birds (mostly waterfowl) and the occupants of this region exploited some fish as well. Avian fauna is extremely diverse including mallard, teal, swan and geese. The Broken Mammoth site boasts a well-preserved display of animal resources, most notably of large animals including mammoth, elk, caribou and bison. It appears that large animals, particularly bison and elk were important. It is possible inhabitants even hunted or scavenged mammoth, however they more than likely butchered any mammoth kills away from the site. No post cranial elements of mammoth remains have been found at the Broken Mammoth site however the obvious use of mammoth tusks as tools make it clear that the inhabitants of the area had access to such remains. Radiocarbon dates some of the fossilized ivory from 20,000 B.P. to 18,000 B.P. clearly indicating that it was collected for use as tools. However ivory from the oldest levels at Broken Mammoth dates to approximately 13, 525 B.P. and coincides with the dating of the hearth charcoal at the site that falls within that time period suggesting that the people of the region had contact with living mammoths.

The evidence of this site suggests highly mobile groups who moved seasonally over the landscapes. The people exploited the various resources and wildlife by intercepting the various migratory routes of the herd animals (bison and elk) and migratory birds. The people of the region were hunters of large game such as bison but there is very little evidence that suggests they hunted mammoths. It can be theorized that the technology they had could allow for the opportunistic hunting on mammoths but it is highly unlikely that mammoth was a key resource for these people. It is much more likely that the ivory tools made from mammoth tusks were scavenged.

=== Discovery and excavation ===
The Broken Mammon site is located on a bluff overlooking the Tanana River. Charles E. Holmes found the site in the summer of 1989 while he was conducting an archaeological survey in the area. Holmes named the site Broken Mammoth because of a piece of broken mammoth bone Holmes found on the slope at the front of the site. Preliminary excavations of the site began in 1990 by Holmes and David Yesner with excavations on the site continuing to this day.

== Artifacts and lithic assemblages ==
According to C.E. Holmes, the Beringian Period was the oldest in the Tanana River Valley. This was the period prior to 13,000 B.P., when a land bridge connecting Alaska and Siberia still remained.

In turn, the Beringian Period is subdivided into the older part, dating prior to 13,500 B.P., and the more recent part, called the Chindadn complex, falling between 13,500 B.P. and 13,000 B.P.

The lithics (Stone tools) dated prior to 13,500 B.P. include bifacial tools, blade and microblade technology. Only three sites in the Tanana River Valley have reliably dated to this period, Swan Point, Mead site, and Broken Mammoth.

The Broken Mammoth site can be considered a part of the Nenana complex of tool manufacturing and techniques.

The Chindadn complex dates to 13,500 B.P. to 13,000 B.P. The lithics from this period are small triangular or teardrop-shaped bifaces, usually made of thin flake and often poorly flaked. The Chindadn complex is inadequately seen at the Broken Mammoth site; only a few flakes and bones are directly dated to within this time period with no microblades being found yet at this time.

=== Transitional Period ===
The Transitional Period followed the Beringian Period from 13,000 B.P. to 9,500 B.P. Two types of Chindadn points are associated with this time period, Chindadn point two being triangular shaped and Chindadn point three having a concave shaped base.

Points found at Broken Mammoth of these two type date to approximately 12,100 B.P. Radiocarbon dating of charcoal from hearths found at the site date to approximately to 10,290 B.P. and 12,270 B.P.

At other Tanana River Valley sites such as Swan Point and Healey Lake, microblades were also found with these sites, but not at Broken Mammoth. The reasons for the absence of microblade technology of this time period at Broken Mammoth remain unclear.

=== Hearth remains ===
The remains of several hearths have been found at Broken Mammoth with the radiocarbon dating of the charcoal providing sound evidence for the age of the site. A shallow pit hearth feature was excavated with a radiocarbon date of approximately 4524 years ago and is associated with several flakes and obsidian microblades. This hearth demonstrates that there was some occupation near the bluff's edge at the site. A second hearth radiocarbon dated to about 7,600 years ago has evidence of hearthstones, suggesting occupation for an extended period of time. Two more and (possibly a third) hearths, radio carbon dated from 9,690 years ago; 10,270 years ago; and 10,790 years ago respectively, have been found at the site clearly associated with hearthstones with lithics and the remains of fauna excavated around them. This indicates the occupants stayed at this site for some time, long enough to use the hearths multiple times.

As at other Tanana River Valley sites such as Swan Point, Mead and Healey Lake, artifacts and stone tools found at Broken Mammoth are relatively infrequent. However the artifacts that have been found have provided keen insight into the history of the occupation of the Tanana River Valley.

=== Cultural Zone 1 ===
Artifacts found at the Broken Mammoth site in Cultural Zone 1 include retouched flakes, end and side scrapers, points and point fragments, flake burins, burin spalls, microblades and microblade cores. The materials that these artifacts were made from include rhyolite, chalcedony, chert, basalt and obsidian (the latter providing even more evidence towards an even earlier peopling of North America.) The obsidian that comprised some of the artifacts originated from Batza Tena in northwest Alaska and from the Wrangell–St. Elias National Park and Preserve area in east Alaska. This implies that older sites must exist because the raw materials must have been obtained and then distributed to other regions through trade and interaction. Until these sites are discovered we will not know when the occupation of the Beringian straits began, until then Broken Mammoth establishes the earliest date between 11,000 B.P. and 12,000 B.P.

Other artifacts from Cultural Zone 1 include a nearly complete lanceolate point.

Cultural Zone 2 has only produced a few flakes, fire-broken rocks and hearthstones though there is the possibility that microblades could be excavated closer to the bluff edge.

Excavations at Cultural Zone 3 at the site have yielded many tiny flakes, retouched flakes, larger biface fragments, points and point fragment, hammers made of quartz, and anvils. A small-eyed bone needle was found associated with a hearth that radiocarbon dates to approximately 10,300 B.P. The bone needle suggests that the occupants used this site to process resources, using skins to make clothing.

=== Cultural Zone 4 ===
Debris from the making of tools has been found at Cultural Zone 4. The debris is composed of rhyolite, basalt, obsidian, chert and quartzite, implying that the occupants of the site carried out some manufacturing and or repair of tools.

Artifacts at this zone are largely incomplete but include retouched flakes, scrapers, large a quartz chopper/scraper/plane. Also found at this zone are several ivory tusk fragments with scratches that could have come from stone tools. One tusk fragment has a stone microchip embedded in one of the scratches bolstering this theory. A cache was also found with ivory artifacts, two points, and a possible handle. One of the ivory fragments from this cache was radiocarbon dated to approximately 15,800 B.P. The age of the ivory suggests that it was scavenged by the occupants from a much older kill site as opposed to the inhabitants killing and processing the mammoth themselves.

==== Obsidian ====
The obsidian that was used at this site came from Wiki Peak source, and it was dated as early as 13,400 cal BP.

Such obsidian was also used at the Walker Road, Alaska site, and Moose Creek, Alaska site in the same area—all dating to before 13,000 cal BP.

== Significance ==
The discovery of the Broken Mammoth site establishes that human occupation of central Alaska began sometime before 11,000 B.P. There is evidence to suggest that humans occupied parts of central Alaska before 13,500 B.P. with the possibility that people lived in the region even earlier. The artifacts discovered at Broken Mammoth suggest earlier occupation in northwest and east Alaska as evident by the presence of obsidian materials. The absence of microblades in the lower loess levels at the site suggests that occupants of the site predated microblade technology. However Holmes argues that the absence of the technology at the site does not prove it did not exist during that time period as comparable sites do suggest such technology. Until The Broken Mammoth site offers excellent preservation of remains of the animals, providing archaeologists insight into the hunting methods and food resources utilized by the early peoples in North America.
