= Nutzotin Mountains =

Mountain range in Alaska, US, and Yukon, Canada

- Location within Alaska Location within Yukon

Geography
- Countries: Canada and United States
- Provinces/States: Yukon and Alaska
- Range coordinates: 62°10′N 141°40′W
- Parent range: Alaska Range

The Nutzotin Mountains are a mountain range in Alaska, United States, and Yukon, Canada. They have an area of 829 km^{2} (320 sq mi) and form a subrange of the Alaska Range at its southeastern end. The mountains are located within Wrangell–St. Elias National Park and Preserve, and are named after the Nutzotin indigenous population who lived in the region. The portion of the range in the United States is split between the Southeast Fairbanks and Copper River census areas.

== See also ==
- List of mountain ranges
