= Eielson Air Force Base =

US military facility near Fairbanks, Alaska

- Near Fairbanks, Alaska in the United States of America
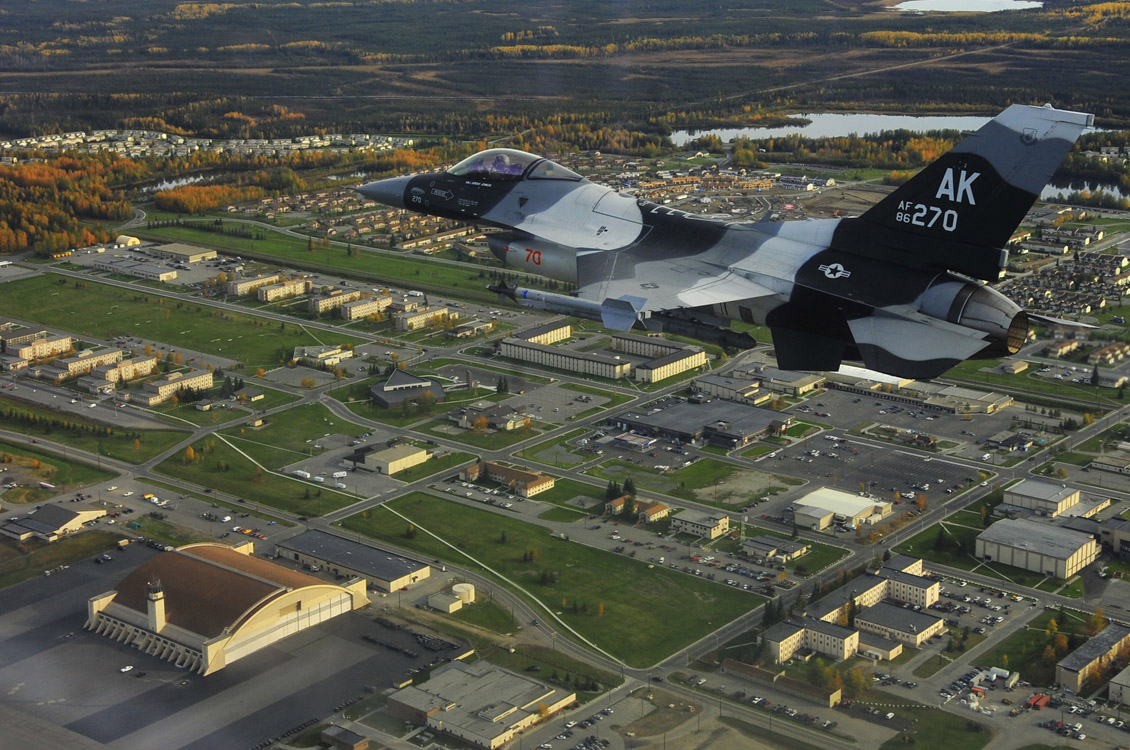
- An F-16 Fighting Falcon from the 18th Aggressor Squadron flies over Eielson AFB during 2009. The base's largest hangar, known as the "Thunderdome," is visible in the bottom left of the image.

Site information
- Type: US Air Force Base
- Owner: Department of Defense
- Operator: US Air Force
- Controlled by: Pacific Air Forces (PACAF)
- Condition: Operational
- Website: www.eielson.af.mil

Location
- Location within Alaska Location within North America Location within North Pacific
- Coordinates: 64°39′56″N 147°06′05″W

Site history
- Built: 1943 (as Mile 26 Satellite Field, redesignated 1948 as Eielson AFB)
- In use: 1943 – present

Garrison information
- Current commander: Colonel Matthew Johnston
- Garrison: 354th Fighter Wing (host)

Airfield information
- Identifiers: IATA: EIL, ICAO: PAEI, FAA LID: EIL, WMO: 702650
- Elevation: 167 metres (548 ft) AMSL
Runways
Direction	Length and surface
14/32	4,428.7 metres (14,530 ft) concrete

Eielson Air Force Base (IATA: EIL, ICAO: PAEI, FAA LID: EIL) is a United States Air Force (USAF) base located approximately 26 miles (42 km) southeast of Fairbanks, Alaska, and just southeast of Moose Creek, Alaska. It was established in 1943 as Mile 26 Satellite Field and redesignated Eielson Air Force Base on 13 January 1948. It has been a Superfund site since 1989. Eielson AFB was named in honor of polar pilot Carl Ben Eielson.

Its host unit is the 354th Fighter Wing (354 FW) assigned to the Eleventh Air Force of the Pacific Air Forces. The 354 FW's primary mission is to support RED FLAG-Alaska, a series of Pacific Air Forces commander–directed field training exercises for U.S. Forces, joint offensive counter-air, interdiction, close-air support, and large force employment training in a simulated combat environment. These exercises are conducted on the Joint Pacific Alaskan Range Complex (JPARC) with air operations flown out of Eielson and its sister installation, Joint Base Elmendorf–Richardson (the former Elmendorf Air Force Base).

Eielson projects to have 54 Lockheed Martin F-35 Lightning II combat aircraft assigned to the installation, of which the first two aircraft arrived on 21 April 2020. The last of the aircraft arrived in April 2022. The planes come with an estimated 3,500 personnel, to include airmen and their families as well as civilian personnel. The F-35 program increases the number of military personnel at Eielson by approximately 50%, which is a significant change for a base once on the brink of closure.

== History ==
=== World War II ===
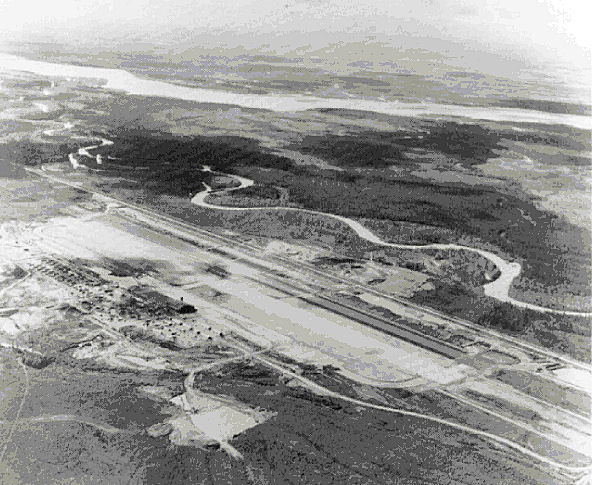
Mile 26 Satellite Field (now Eielson AFB), 1945

On 7 June 1943, the Western Defense Command ordered construction of a new airfield near present-day Fort Wainwright, then a United States Army Air Forces (USAAF) airfield named after Major Arthur K. Ladd. Because of its hazard-free approaches and relatively flat terrain, surveyor reports indicated a site a little more than 25 miles southeast of Ladd Army Airfield to be the best in the vicinity for military aviation. The field became known as "Mile 26" because of its proximity to a United States Army Signal Corps telegraph station and a Richardson Highway milepost marker using the same designation.

A month later, contractors and civilian crews from Ladd Field started laying out the new airfield. Actual construction began on 25 August 1943. Crews built two parallel runways, 165 feet (50 m) across and 6,625 feet (2,019 m) long. Other facilities included an operations building, housing for 108 officer and 330 enlisted personnel, and a ten-bed dispensary. The garrison and airfield totaled about 600 acres (2.4 km^{2}). Completed on 17 October 1944, the 14-month project cost about eight-million dollars.

Operational uses of Mile 26 were few. Ladd Field served as the debarkation point for the Alaska-Siberia Ferry Route of the Lend-Lease program and was the hub of activity. Lend-lease aircraft would occasionally land at Mile 26, but there are no records indicating any lend-lease aircraft used the airfield to depart for the Soviet Union. Mile 26 closed when the war ended.

=== Cold War ===
The base reopened in September 1946, once again as a satellite of Ladd Field. The first USAAF operational unit assigned to Eielson was the 57th Fighter Group, equipped successively with P-38 Lightnings, P/F-51 Mustangs, F-80 Shooting Stars, and F-94 Starfire aircraft. The 57th FG was inactivated on 13 April 1953. On 1 December 1947 Strategic Air Command B-29 Superfortress bombers arrived at Mile 26 Field with the deployment of the 97th Bombardment Wing, Very Heavy, from Smoky Hill Air Force Base, Kansas. The wing reported to Fifteenth Air Force, Strategic Air Command (SAC), although the Yukon Sector of the Alaskan Air Command controlled its operations. At the end of the Alaskan deployment the wing returned to Kansas on 12 March 1948.

A year later Eielson moved from under the shadow of Ladd Field when the Alaskan Air Command assumed organizational control. Also in the fall of 1947, Colonel Jerome B. McCauley assumed duties as commander. The primary missions of Mile 26 were to support Arctic training for USAF tactical and strategic units, as well as defend the base itself.

Headquarters USAF General Order 2, dated 13 January 1948, redesignated Mile 26 as Eielson Air Force Base. It was named for Carl Ben Eielson, an Alaska aviation pioneer who was killed, along with his mechanic Earl Borland, in the crash of their Hamilton H-45 aircraft in 1929. Eielson and Borland were attempting a rescue flight to an icebound ship in the Bering Sea when they were killed. On 1 April 1948, the Eielson Air Force Base Wing (Base Complement) was formed. The host-unit subsequently would be dubbed the Eielson Air force Base Bomb Wing, and finally, in January 1949, the 5010th Wing. Colonel John L. Nedwed, the third commander of the base since it fell under Alaskan Air Command fifteen months before, became the first to head the 5010th.

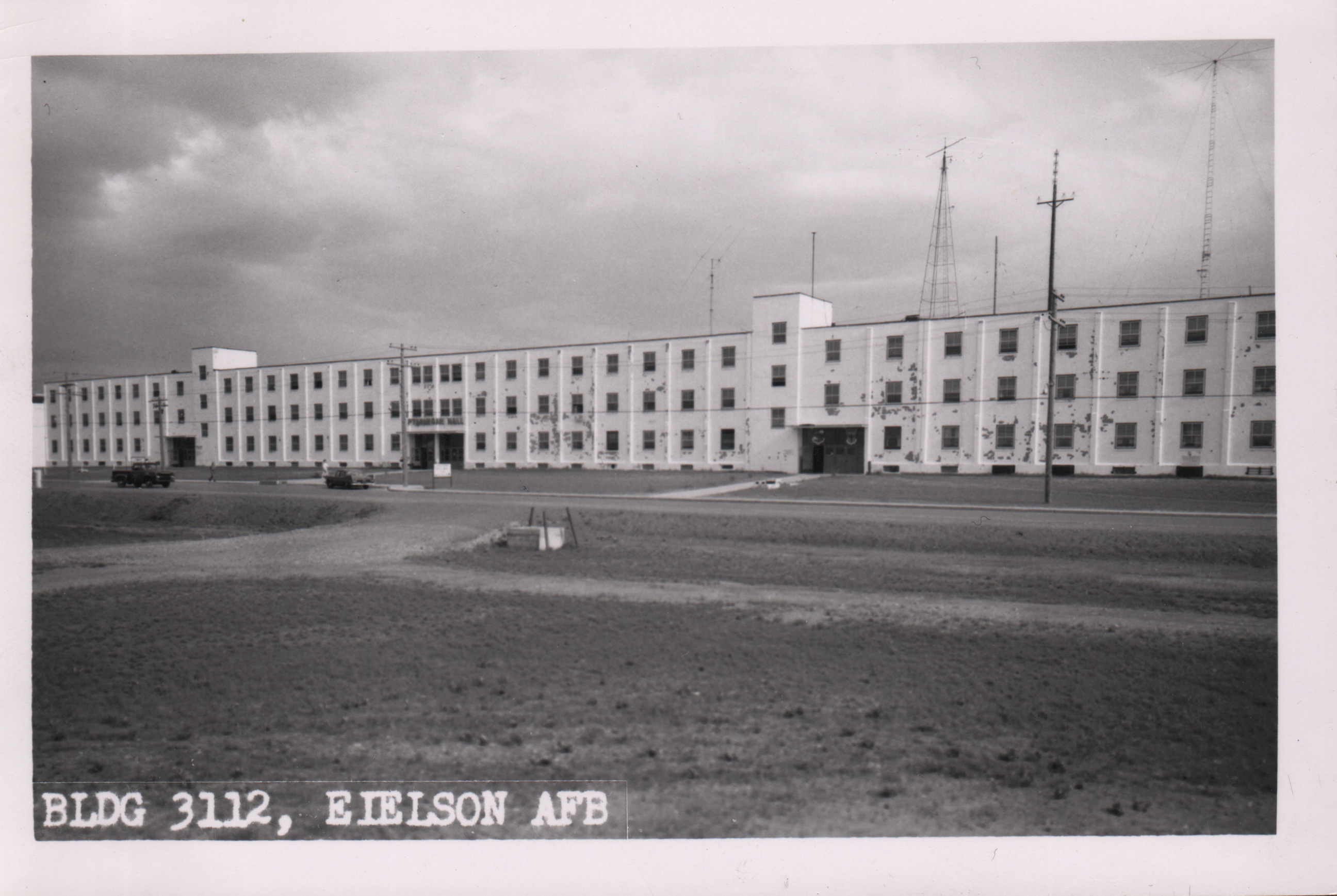
Ptarmigan Hall in 1962, later renamed to Amber Hall

For the next 34 years, the 5010th (alternately known as the Wing, Composite Wing, Air Base Wing, and lastly, Combat Support Group) served as host-unit at Eielson. Construction boomed at Eielson during the 1950s. Many of the facilities used today were built at that time, including Amber Hall, the Thunderdome, Base Exchange, Gymnasium, Theater, some of the schools, and many of the dormitories.

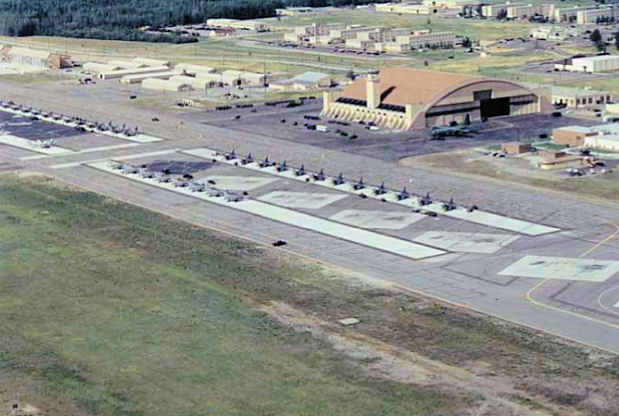
The flight line and Thunderdome hangar building at Eielson

The 720th Fighter-Bomber Squadron, equipped with F-86 Sabres, was deployed to Eielson during 1954–55. The 720th was a part of the 450th Fighter-Bomber Wing stationed at Foster Air Force Base, Texas. The 720th was replaced by the 455th Fighter-Bomber Squadron (323d FBW), stationed at Bunker Hill Air Force Base, Indiana.

The Air Defense Command deployed interceptors to Eielson during the 1960s. Det. 3, 317th Fighter-Interceptor Squadron from Elmendorf Air Force Base deployed F-102 Delta Daggers and F-106 Delta Darts to the base between 1960 and 1969.

During the height of the Cuban Missile Crisis of October 1962, Eielson-based Lockheed U-2 pilot Charles Maultsby was allegedly blinded by the aurora borealis while collecting radiation from Soviet nuclear weapons tests over the North Pole and accidentally strayed 300 miles (480 km) into Soviet airspace, into Chukotka. Soviet MiG interceptors were sent to intercept the plane before he was escorted back to U.S. territory by nuclear-armed F-102 interceptors.

The Cold War saw the use of Eielson's expansive reservation as a maneuver area for the U.S. Army. The 1960s 171st Infantry Brigade (Separate) and 172nd Infantry Brigade (Separate) both trained here, both on a regular and extensive basis, not to mention units of the Alaska National Guard. Later in the 70s mid 80s the 172nd Infantry Brigade (the 171st Infantry Brigade was inactivated on 13 November 1972), followed by the 6th Infantry Division when the 172nd Infantry Brigade itself was deactivated on 15 April 1986 (it was reactivated in Alaska on 17 April 1998, and inactivated in Iraq on 14 December 2006)

Today the 1st Brigade 25th Infantry Division and the 4th Brigade 25th Infantry Division can be found training there. Several important large scale winter field problems have been conducted here over the years as well, seeing large numbers of U.S. Army ground combat units from the Contiguous United States lower 48 states, U.S. Marine Corps units, and Canadian Armed Forces troops.

375th/58th Strategic Weather Squadron

The 375th Weather Reconnaissance Squadron, from the 308th Bombardment Group at Tinker Air Force Base, Oklahoma, arrived at Eielson on 5 March 1949. The 308th flew WB-29 Superfortresses. The unit was redesignated the 58th Strategic Weather Squadron on 21 February 1951 as part of the 303d Bombardment Wing at Davis-Monthan Air Force Base, Arizona.

The 58th Weather Squadron remained at Eielson until 8 August 1958.

6th Strategic Wing

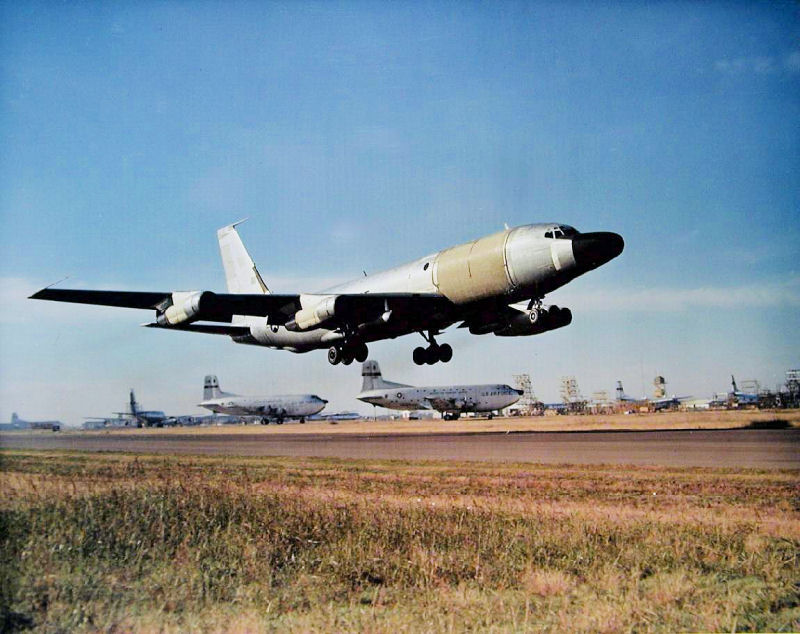
A SAC RC-135 Recon Aircraft of the 6th Strategic Reconnaissance Wing

In July 1960, the Strategic Air Command (SAC) stationed the 4157th Combat Support Group (later Strategic Wing) at Eielson. The 6th Strategic Wing (6 SW) replaced the 4157 SW on 25 March 1967, relocating from Walker Air Force Base, New Mexico after its closure.

The 6th SW flew RC–135 strategic reconnaissance missions with an assigned squadron, and, with KC–135 Stratotankers deployed to Eielson from SAC, Air Force Reserve Command (AFRC), and the Air National Guard (ANG), conducted Alaska Tanker Task Force (ATTF) missions to support reconnaissance and numerous exercises for the USAF and U.S. Navy.

The 6th SW remained at Eielson AFB until 1992.

343d Composite Wing

A new chapter for the base began 1 October 1981 when the 343d Composite Wing replaced the 5010th as Eielson's host unit. Flying squadrons assigned to the new wing included the 25th Tactical Air Support Squadron (TASS) and the 18th Fighter Squadron (18 FS). The 25 TASS, at Eielson since 1971, flew O-2 Skymaster and OV-10 Bronco aircraft until its inactivation in 1989; the newly assigned 18 FS operated A-10 Thunderbolt IIs until it converted to F-16 Fighting Falcons in 1991.

In 1984, the 343d Composite Wing was redesignated a Tactical Fighter Wing. Seven years later, in 1991, it was redesignated as the 343d Wing. Also that year, the 343d gained a second flying unit, the 11th Tactical Air Support Squadron (11 TASS), which flew OA-10 aircraft.

=== 354th Fighter Wing ===
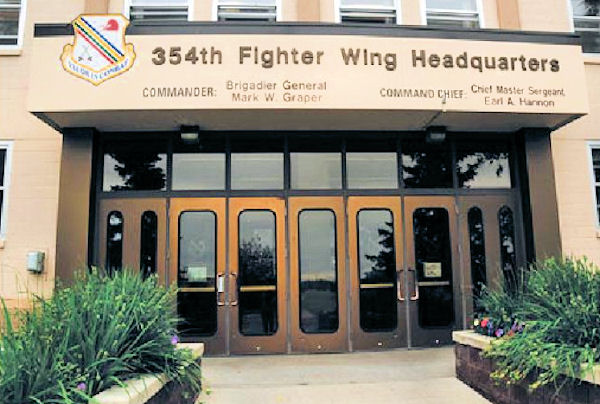
354th Fighter Wing Headquarters building

On 20 August 1993, the 354 FW replaced the 343d Wing. No personnel or equipment were affected by the change. Prior to its shutdown, the 343d was the oldest surviving air combat unit in Alaska with a lineage dating back to the Aleutian Campaign. The 18 FS, whose history also dated back to World War II, remained active, but the 355 FS replaced the 11th TASS.

Another change involved the 3rd Fighter Training Squadron, which was replaced by the 353rd Fighter Squadron (later redesignated as a Combat Training Squadron).

Within the first year of its arrival the 354 FW hosted an Arctic combat search and rescue exercise between the United States, Canada, and Russia. Ironically, these were the same countries that took part in the search and recovery efforts that followed the fatal crash of Carl Ben Eielson and his mechanic, Earl Borland, in 1930 as they were attempting to fly relief supplies to the Nanuk.

The 343d FW 3d Fighter Training Squadron was replaced by the 353d Fighter Training Squadron from the 354th FW. The 3d Fighter Training Squadron had its origins with the 3d Tactical Fighter Squadron at Korat Royal Thai Air Force Base, Thailand, being formed in March 1973. The 3d TFS received its A-7D Corsair II aircraft from the then deployed 353d Tactical Fighter Squadron of the 354th Tactical Fighter Wing, deployed to Korat from Myrtle Beach Air Force Base, South Carolina.

== Role and operations ==
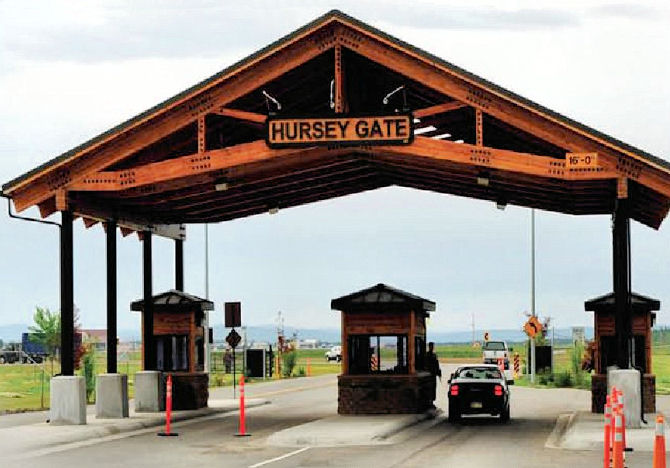
Hursey Gate at Eielson, the primary access point to and from the base. A partial interchange was built on the Richardson Highway in conjunction with the relocation and rebuilding of the gate.

Eielson is home to the 354th Fighter Wing which is part of the Eleventh Air Force (11 AF) of the Pacific Air Forces.

Airmen who are stationed on Eielson commonly refer to themselves as "Icemen" due to the frigid Alaskan weather. Their wing motto is: "Ready to go at fifty below!"

The 356th Fighter Squadron was reactivated on 10 October 2019 at Eielson Air Force Base, assigned to the 354th Operations Group. It is to be equipped with the F-35A Lightning II.

=== Previous names ===
- Established as Mile 26 Satellite Field (of Ladd Air Force Base) about 15 December 1943
- Mile 26 Field, 1 October 1947
- Eielson Air Force Base, 13 January 1948–present

Eielson's tower and base operations, along with much of Alaska, is under snow for about six months out of the year.

=== Major commands ===
- Army Air Forces Transport Command (June 1943 – November 1945)
- Eleventh Air Force (November–December 1945)
- Alaskan Air Command (December 1945 – August 1990)
- Pacific Air Forces (August 1990–present)

=== Base operating units ===
- Stn No. 4, Alaskan Wg (AAFTC) (September 1943 – August 1944)
- 1466th Army Air Force Base Unit (August 1944 – January 1945)
- Satellite Fld 1466-1 Army Air Force Base Unit (January–June 1945)
- HQ and Base Service Sq, 519th Air Service Group (November–December 1947)
- 97th Airdrome Group (December 1947 – April 1948)
- Eielson AFB Wing (Base Complement) (April–September 1948)
- Eielson Bomb Wing (September 1948 – June 1949)
- 5010th Composite Wing (June 1949 – January 1951)
- 5010th Air Base Group (January 1951 – February 1953)
- 5010th Composite Wing (February 1953 – October 1954)
- 5010th Air Base Wing (October 1954 – January 1965)
- 5010th Combat Support Gp (January 1965 – October 1981)
- 343d Tactical Fighter Wing (October 1981 – July 1991)
- 343d Wing (July 1991 – August 1993)
- 354th Fighter Wing (August 1993–present)

=== Major units assigned ===
- 6th Strategic Wing (March 1967 – June 1992)
- 97th Bombardment Wing (December 1947 – March 1948)
- 343d Tactical Fighter Wing (October 1981 – August 1993)
- 354th Fighter Wing (August 1993–present)
- 4157th Strategic Wing (July 1960 – March 1967)
- 5010th Air Base Wing (April 1948 – October 1981)
- 168th Air Refueling Wing (Alaska ANG)
- 57th Fighter Group (September 1946 – April 1953)
- 5010th Combat Support Group
- 11th Tactical Air Support Squadron
- 18th Fighter (later Aggressor) Squadron
- 25th Tactical Air Support Squadron

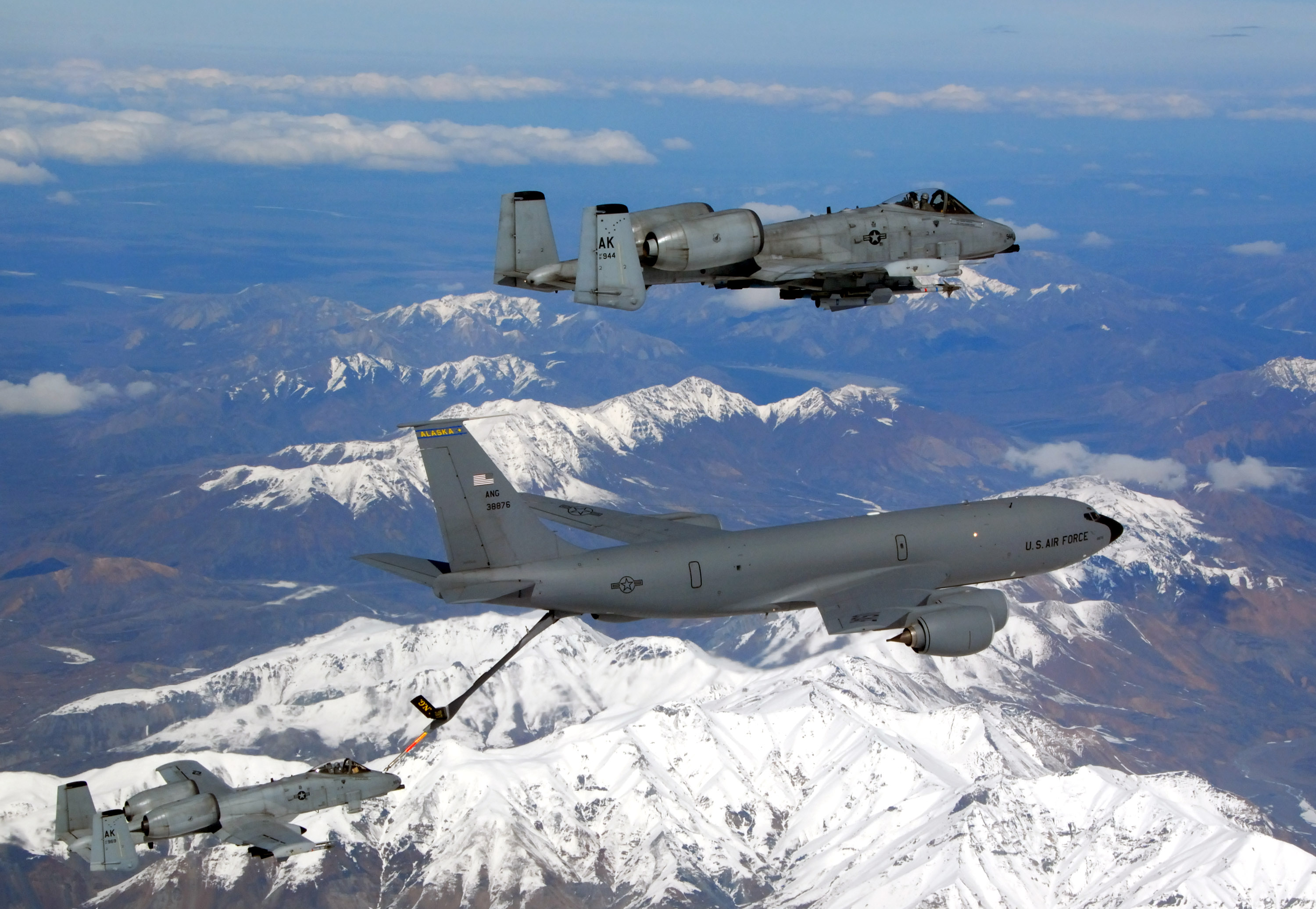
An A-10 Thunderbolt II is refueled mid-air by a KC-135 Stratotanker from the Alaska Air National Guard's 168th Air Refueling Wing.

- 40th Air Refueling Squadron
- 55th Weather Recon Squadron Det 1
- 58th Weather Recon Squadron
- 65th Fighter Squadron
- 71st Aerospace Rescue and Recovery Squadron Det 1
- 317th Fighter-Interceptor Squadron Det 3
- 355th Fighter Squadron
- 375th Reconnaissance Squadron
- 455th Fighter-Bomber Squadron
- 720th Fighter-Bomber Squadron
- 5040th Helicopter Squadron Det 1

=== Aircraft operated ===
- A-10 Thunderbolt II (1981–2007)
- B-29/RB-29/WB-29 (1949–1956)
- WB-47 Stratojet (1960–1968)
- WB-50 Superfortress (1960–1968)
- VC/SC/C-47 Skytrain (1949–1969)
- C-123 Provider (1965–1966, 1969–1971)
- F-4 Phantom II Det DC (1970–1982)
- F-16 Fighting Falcon (1991–present)
- P-80 Shooting Star (1950–1951)
- F-86 Sabre (1954–1955)
- F-102 Delta Dagger (1960–1969)
- U-2 Dragon Lady (1962–1964)
- F-106 Delta Dart (1965–1969)
- HH-3E Jolly Green Giant (1970–1990)
- Piasecki CH/SH/HH-21 (1960–1980)
- KC-97 Stratofreighter (1959–1961)
- KC-135 Stratotanker (1967–present)
- de Havilland Canada DHC-2 Beaver (1952–1960)
- O-2 Skymaster (1971–1989)
- OV-10 Bronco (1986–1989)
- P-51 Mustang (1946–1947)
- Boeing RC-135 (1962–1992)
- T-33 Shooting Star (1950–1981)
- P-38 Lightning (1946–1953)
- F-35 Lightning II (2020–Present)

== Based units ==
Flying and notable non-flying units based at Eielson Air Force Base.

Units marked "GSU" are Geographically Separate Units, which although based at Eielson, are subordinate to a parent unit based at another location.

=== United States Air Force ===
Pacific Air Forces

- Eleventh Air Force
  - 354th Fighter Wing (host wing)
    - Headquarters 354th Fighter Wing
    - 354th Operations Group
      - 18th Fighter Interceptor Squadron – F-16C/D Fighting Falcon
      - 353rd Combat Training Squadron
      - 354th Operations Support Squadron
      - 355th Fighter Squadron – F-35A Lightning II
      - 356th Fighter Squadron – F-35A Lightning II
    - 354th Maintenance Group
      - 354th Aircraft Maintenance Squadron
      - 354th Maintenance Squadron
      - 354th Munitions Squadron
      - Air Force Engineering and Technical Services
    - 354th Medical Group
      - 354th Medical Operations Squadron
      - 354th Medical Support Squadron
    - 354th Mission Support Group
      - 354th Civil Engineer Squadron
      - 354th Communications Squadron
      - 354th Contracting Squadron
      - 354th Force Support Squadron
      - 354th Logistics Readiness Squadron
      - 354th Security Forces Squadron

Air Education and Training Command (AETC)

- Nineteenth Air Force
  - 58th Special Operations Wing
    - 336th Training Group
      - 66th Training Squadron
        - Detachment 1 – Arctic Survival School (GSU)
  - 82nd Training Wing
    - 982nd Training Group
      - 372nd Training Squadron
        - Detachment 25 (GSU)

Air National Guard

- Alaska Air National Guard
  - 168th Air Refueling Wing
    - Headquarters 168th Air Refueling Wing
    - 168th Operations Group
      - 168th Air Refueling Squadron – KC-135R Stratotanker
      - 168th Operations Support Flight
    - 168th Maintenance Group
      - 168th Aircraft Maintenance Squadron
      - 168th Maintenance Squadron
      - 168th Maintenance Operations Flight
    - 168th Mission Support Group
      - 168th Civil Engineers Squadron
      - 168th Communications Flight
      - 168th Logistics Readiness Squadron
      - 168th Mission Support Flight
      - 168th Security Forces Squadron
      - 268th Security Forces Squadron
    - 168th Medical Group
  - 176th Wing
    - 176th Operations Group
      - 210th Rescue Squadron
        - Detachment 1 (GSU) – HH-60G Pave Hawk
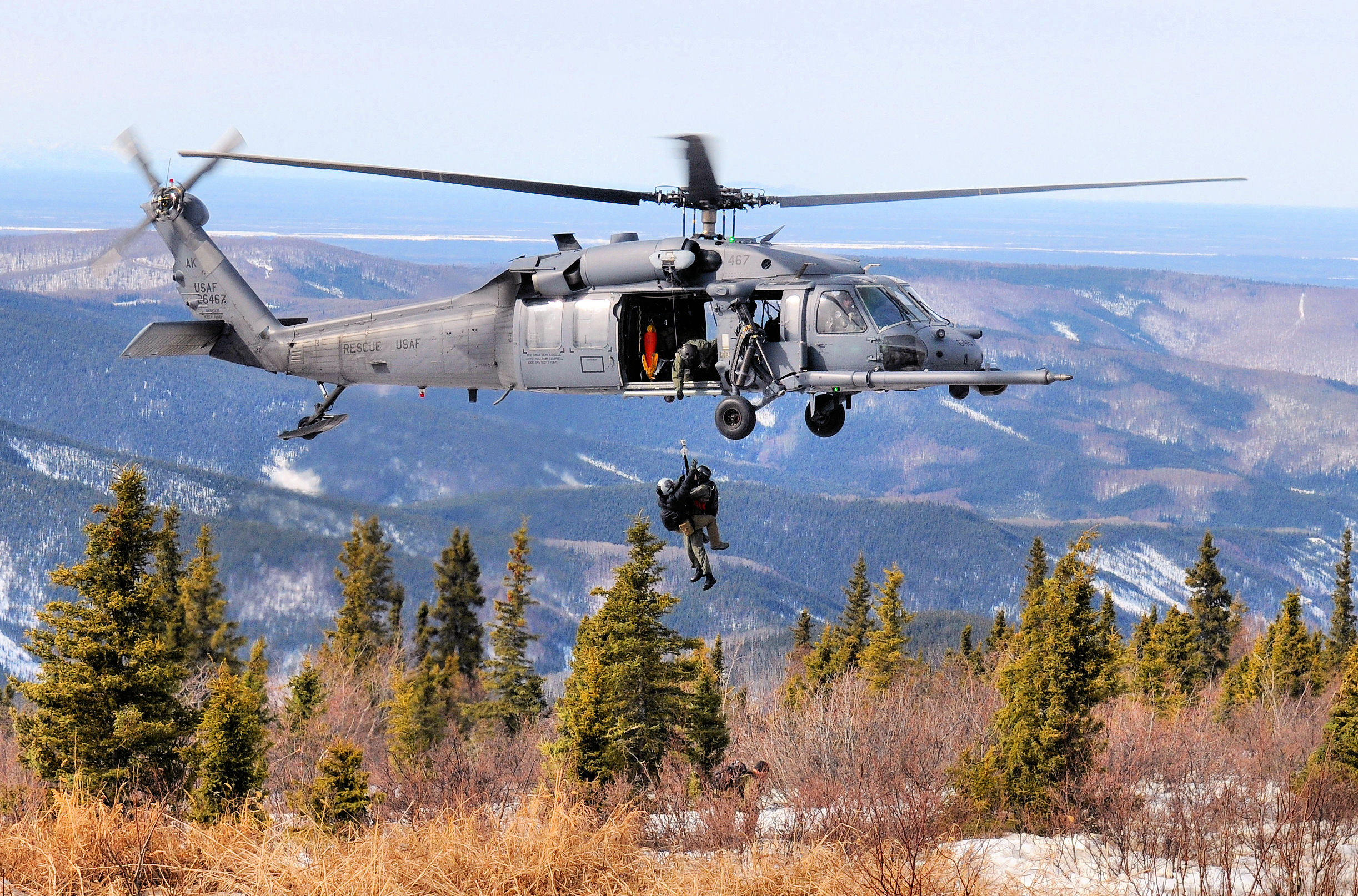
- A HH-60 Pavehawk from the 210th Rescue Squadron Detachment 1, rescue simulated downed pilots during Red-Flag Alaska 09–2.
  210th Rescue Squadron Detachment 1

Air Combat Command (ACC)

- Sixteenth Air Force
  - Air Force Technical Applications Center
    - Detachment 460 (GSU)

Air Force Office of Special Investigations

- Region 6
  - Detachment 632

== Eielson's locomotives ==
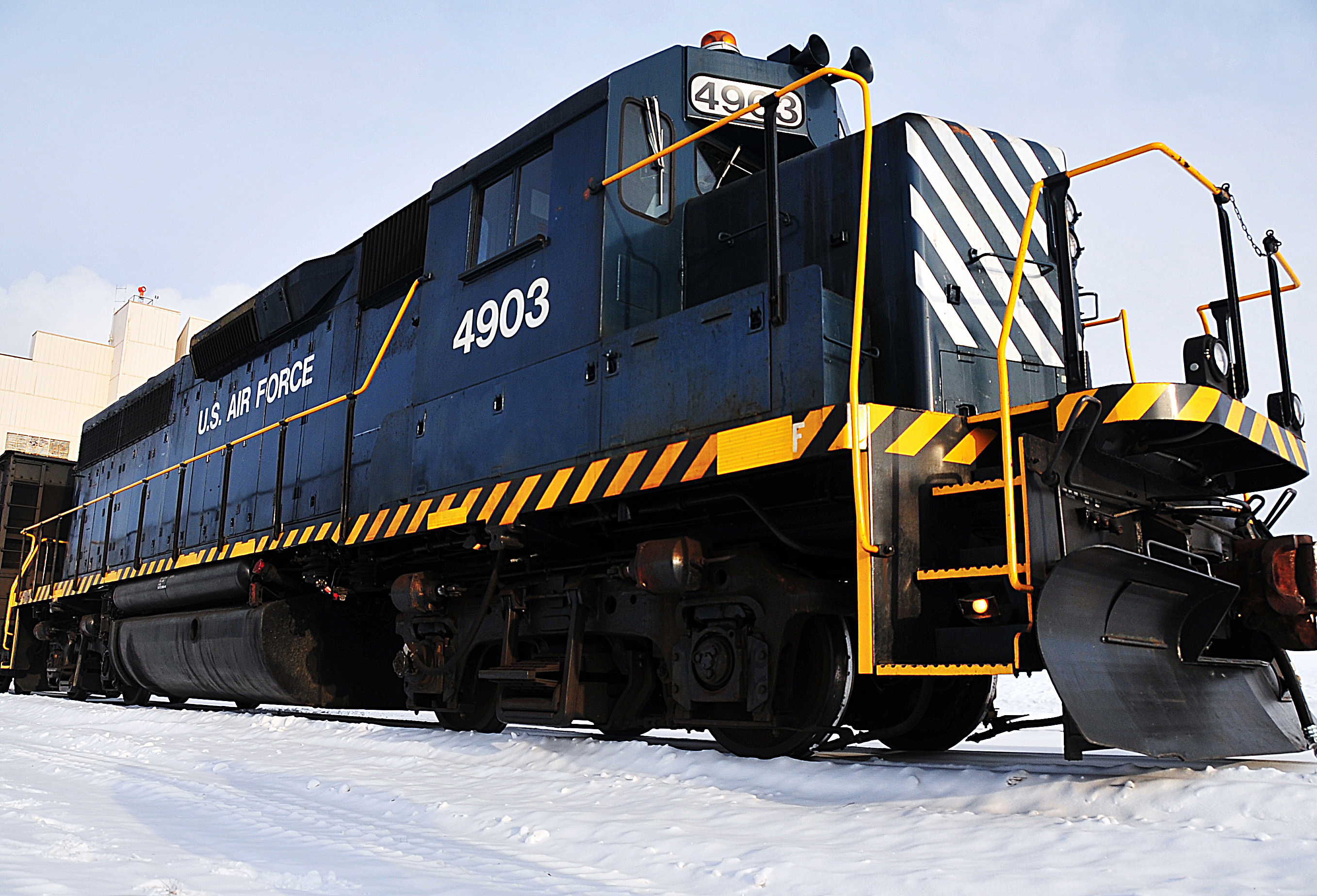
A U.S. Air Force EMD GP40-2 locomotive sits outside Eielson's central heat and power plant. The base owns two of these locomotives, both moving coal and rail traffic across the 11 mi (18 km) rail system. Seen here is #4903.

Eielson Air Force Base has several locomotives to transport coal in winter to the base's power station.

== Microreactor ==
The Department of the Air Force has selected Eielson Air Force Base for its first nuclear microreactor. A National Environmental Policy Act (NEPA) assessment will begin by 2024. Microreactor testing and demonstration of power and steam is expected by year-end 2027.

== Environmental problems ==
Eielson Air Force Base was proposed to be a Superfund site on 14 July 1989, and was officially designated as such on 21 November 1989.

The groundwater contains lead and volatile organic compounds (VOCs) like benzene, xylene, and toluene. Several areas of underground petroleum-contaminated soil and floating petroleum product are the sources of continuing groundwater contamination. Ingesting or coming into direct contact with contaminated groundwater or soil can pose a potential health threat. Polychlorinated biphenyl (PCB)-contaminated fish were also found in the area. Construction of the superfund site was complete in 1998.

In 2014, Eielson tested waters and soils for perfluorinated compounds around areas where aqueous film forming foam (AFFF) had been used for firefighting and training. In March 2015, the base changed its source of drinking water, because contamination had been found. In April 2015, wells near Moose Creek, Alaska, the community to the north, were tested and found contaminated. In July 2015, water from 132 Moose Creek wells, which serve more than 200 residences, was found to contain perfluorooctane sulfonate (PFOS) above the health advisory level of 0.2 micrograms per liter by the United States Environmental Protection Agency (EPA). The highest reading in Moose Creek was 2.09 micrograms per liter, and the highest level on Eielson reached 2,000 micrograms per liter at the site of a KC-135 aircraft fire in 1989. The Alaska Department of Environmental Conservation said "contamination stretches 6.5 miles from the south of Eielson's runway to the north of Moose Creek and is found up to 100 feet deep". As of August 2015 the extent of contamination was unknown and if there was one large plume or multiple small ones. The USAF has held meetings to discuss different solutions for providing affected homes with water. As of May 2016, between 145 and 150 homes had well water with PFOS above the EPA health advisory concentrations. With EPA's national water quality standard announced in May 2016, 15 more homes in the Moose Creek community were added. Work is now being done to connect the affected homes to water from the City of North Pole's public utilities.

== Demographics ==
Historical population
Census	Pop.	Note	%±
1970	6,149		—
1980	5,232		−14.9%
1990	5,251		0.4%
2000	5,400		2.8%
2010	2,647		−51.0%
2020	2,610		−1.4%
U.S. Decennial Census

Location within Fairbanks North Star Borough and the state of Alaska

Eielson Air Force Base first appeared on the 1970 United States census as an unincorporated area. In 1980, it was made a census-designated place (CDP). It is located within Fairbanks North Star Borough, Alaska.

As of the census of 2000, there were 5,400 people, 1,448 households, and 1,414 families residing on the base. The population density was 40.1 people/km^{2} (104 people/mi^{2}). There were 1,531 housing units at an average density of 11.4 units/km^{2} (30 units/mi^{2}). The racial makeup of the base was 81.7% White, 9.4% Black or African American, 0.6% Native American, 2.1% Asian, 0.2% Pacific Islander, 2.2% from other races, and 3.9% from two or more races, and 5.8% of the population were Hispanic or Latino of any race.

There were 1,448 households, out of which 77.8% had children under the age of 18 living with them, 92.4% were married couples living together, 2.7% had a female householder with no husband present, and 2.3% were non-families. 2.1% of all households were made up of individuals, and 0.0% had someone living alone who was 65 years of age or older. The average household size was 3.52 and the average family size was 3.55. At the base the population was spread out, with 40.8% under the age of 18, 16.6% from 18 to 24, 41.2% from 25 to 44, 1.2% from 45 to 64, and 0.2% who were 65 years of age or older. The median age was 22 years. For every 100 females there were 110.3 males. For every 100 females age 18 and over, there were 114.7 males.

The median income for a household in the base was $35,938, and the median income for a family was $35,688. Males had a median income of $24,961 versus $21,432 for females. The per capita income for the base was $11,512. 6.0% of the population and 5.1% of families were below the poverty line. Of the total population, 7.5% under the age of 18 years and 0.0% of those 65 and older were living below the poverty line.

== 2005 BRAC proceedings ==
On 13 May 2005, The United States Department of Defense proposed a major realignment of the base as part of the Base Realignment and Closure program.

- It was decided that Eielson Air Force Base was to remain open.
- That the 354th Wing's A-10 Thunderbolt II aircraft were to be redistributed to the Air Force Reserve Command's 917th Wing (now the 917th Fighter Group of the 442d Fighter Wing) at Barksdale Air Force Base, Louisiana (three aircraft); to the Air Combat Command's 23d Wing at Moody Air Force Base, Georgia (12 aircraft); and to backup inventory at AMARC at Davis-Monthan Air Force Base, Arizona (three aircraft). This action was part of a larger effort to consolidate the A-10 fleet. The 355th Fighter Squadron (355 FS) was inactivated on 15 August 2007 when the last A-10 departed Eielson.
- The 18th Fighter Squadron (18 FS) converted to the 18th Aggressor Squadron. This squadron trains in the same manner as the aggressors at Nellis Air Force Base, learning the flying styles and abilities of foreign air forces to train USAF pilots. Aircraft changes entail sending all 18 of its Block 40 F-16 Fighting Falcons to Kunsan Air Base, Korea, and receiving 18 Block 30 F-16Cs from Kunsan. The 18th Aggressor Squadron was officially established on 24 August 2007.
- The Alaska Air National Guard's 168th Air Refueling Wing and its KC-135 Stratotanker aircraft will remain at Eielson.

== Education ==
The school district for dependents living on-post is the Fairbanks North Star Borough School District (FNSBSD). The Department of Defense Education Activity (DoDEA) does not operate any schools for this facility. Residents on-post are zoned to Anderson-Crawford Elementary School, North Pole Middle School, and North Pole High School.

The base formerly housed two separate elementary schools, Anderson and Crawford (grades K-2 and 3-6, respectively), along with Ben Eielson Junior/Senior High School. In 2022 Anderson closed. The junior-senior high school closed 2024, due to a loss in funds.

== See also ==
- Alaska World War II Army Airfields
- Air Transport Command
- Northwest Staging Route
