= Nenana Valley =

Archaeological site in Alaska

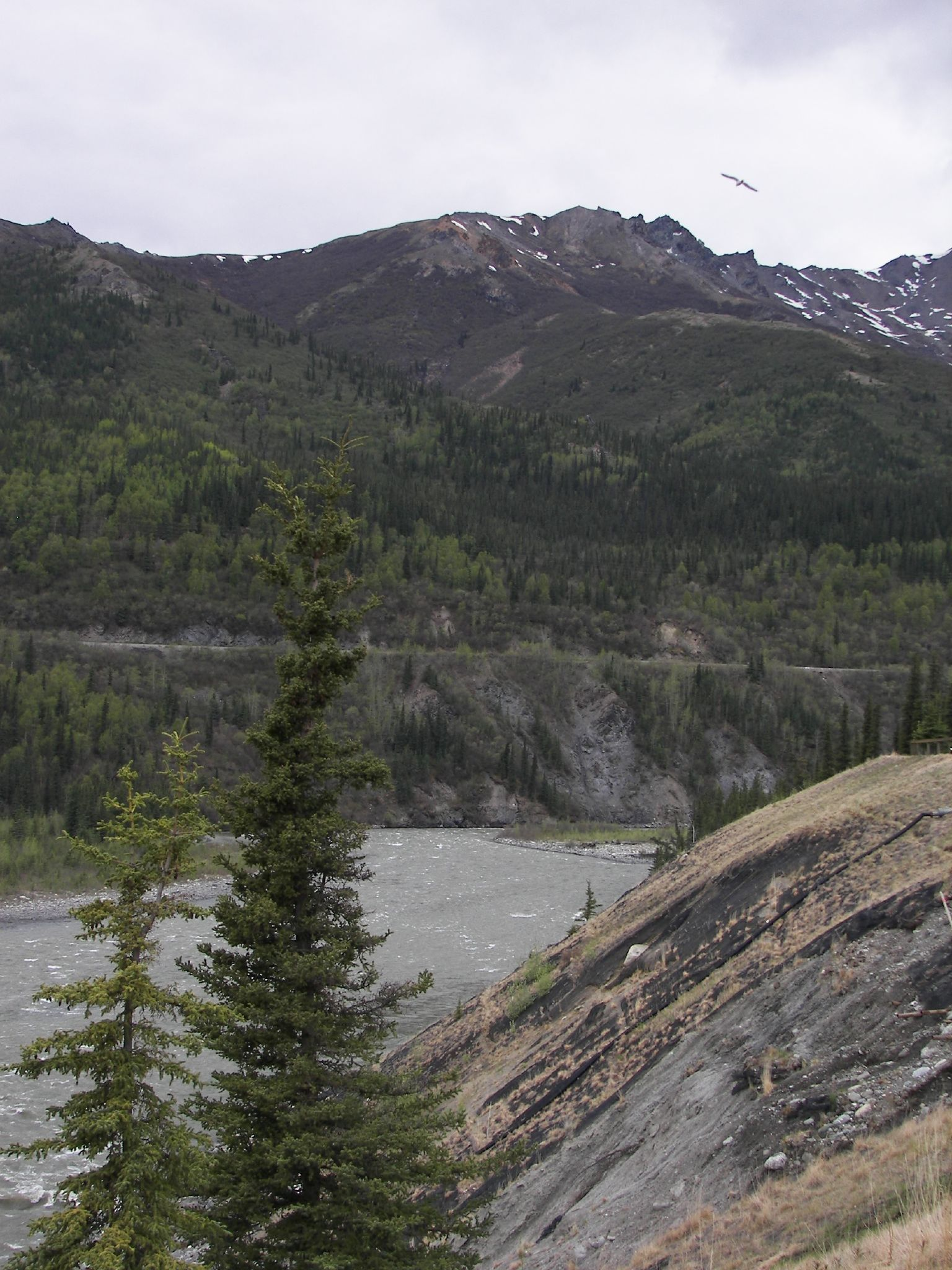
- Overlook of the Nenana Valley
- Cultures: Preceded the Clovis culture
- Location: Nenana Valley, Alaska

History
- Built: c. 11,000 BP

Site notes
- Public access: Yes

Nenana Valley is an archaeological site in the Yukon-Koyukuk Census Area of Alaska.

The site was first occupied around 11,000 years ago (early Holocene) and represents one of the earliest known sites in Arctic North America. The location of artifacts in the stratigraphic column suggests that, originally, the site was not occupied year-round, and that during the last glacial period people would have been travelling back and forth between North America and Asia, using this site as an outpost. Zooarchaeological evidence, such as mammoth and sheep bones, suggest that people were following these paths seasonally for hunting. As the ice age ended, the site would have become a more permanent residence. Points found here suggest that the culture is ancestral to that which created the Clovis points, of which variations can be found across North America.

== See also ==
- Upward Sun River site
- Paleo-Arctic tradition
