= 5070th Air Defense Wing =

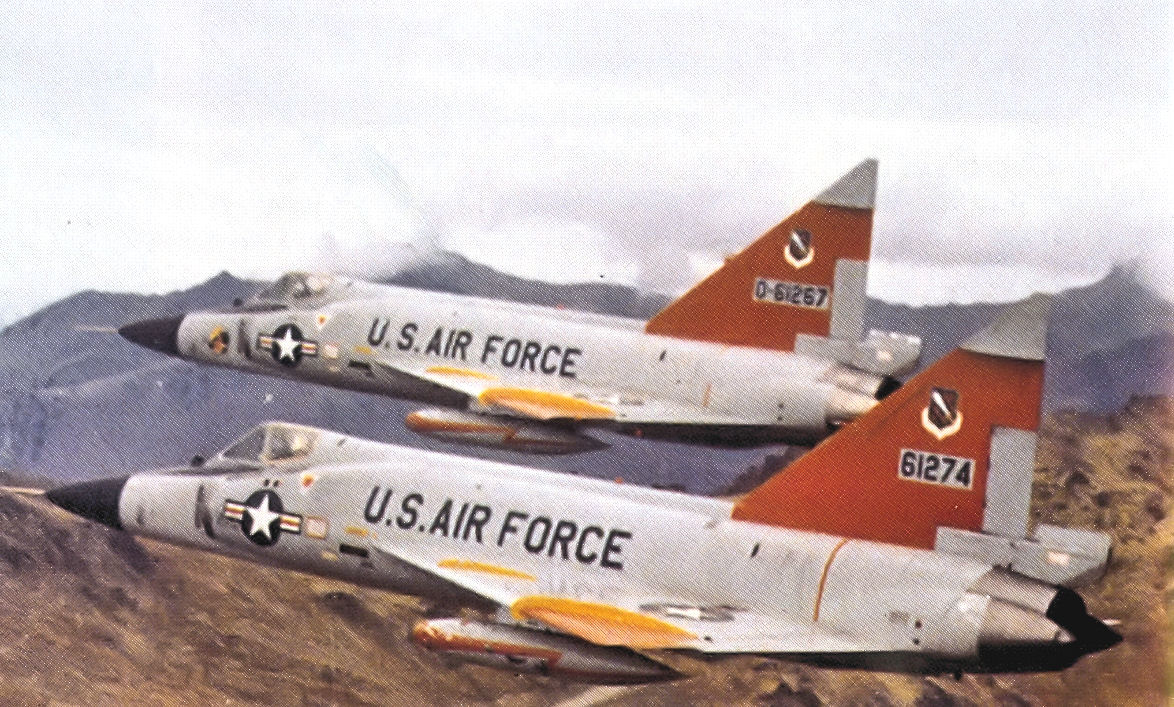
- 317th Fighter-Interceptor Squadron F-102As (Note: Aircraft are Convair F-102-70-CO Delta Daggers, serials 56-1267 and 56-1274. Both aircraft were later converted to QF-102A drones and expended as aerial targets. The plane on display at Elmendorf Air Force Base is marked as serial 56-1274, but is actually F-102, serial 56-1053. Dirkx, Marco (23 September 2025). "1956 USAF Serial Numbers". Joe Baugher’s Serial Number List.)
- Active: 1960-1961
- Country: United States
- Branch: United States Air Force
- Type: Fighter Interceptor
- Role: Air defense

The 5070th Air Defense Wing is a discontinued United States Air Force organization. It was assigned to the Alaskan Air Command at Elmendorf Air Force Base, Alaska, where it was active from August 1960 until October 1961 as the headquarters for air defense units in Alaska.

== History ==
The 5070th Air Defense Wing was established at Elmendorf Air Force Base in August 1960. In August 1960, Alaskan Air Command inactivated the 10th and 11th Air Divisions. The wing assumed most of the divisions' subordinate units and the mission of the air defense of Alaska.

The wing was assigned a single interceptor aircraft squadron, the 317th, equipped with Convair F-102 Delta Daggers. In addition to standing alert at its home base at Elmendorf, the squadron deployed fighters to King Salmon Airport and Galena Air Force Base. Although the squadron launched aircraft to intercept Soviet aircraft penetrating the Alaskan air defense identification zone, none were successful. (Note: Ptior to the wing's discontinuation, 16 attempts had been made to intercept Soviet planes near Alaska, but none were successful. The first successful intercept occurred in December 1961 by an F-102 deployed to Galnea. Air Defense of Arctic Skies, p. 25.)

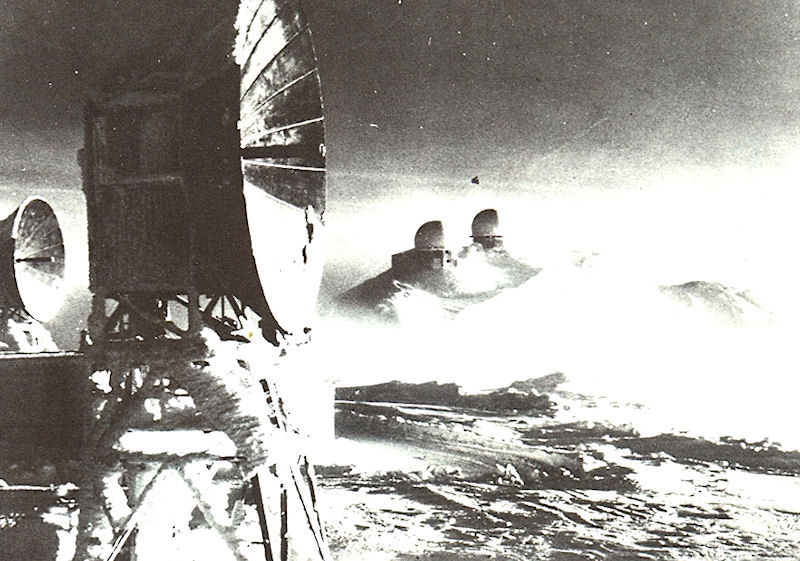
Tatalina Air Force Station in the winter

It was also assigned a number of aircraft control and warning squadrons, located throughout Alaska. Its 5070th Radar Evaluation Squadron provided target aircraft for fighter aircraft operating under Alaskan Air Command control and electronic countermeasure training for both fighter and ground radar units. It calibrated and evaluated the performance of radar sites.

The wing was discontinued on 1 October 1961, and most of its components were reassigned directly to Alaskan Air Command.

== Lineage ==
- Designated as the 5070th Air Defense Wing and organized on 1 August 1960

Discontinued on 1 October 1961

=== Assignments ===
- Alaskan Air Command, 1 August 1960 – 1 October 1961

=== Components ===
- 317th Fighter-Interceptor Squadron, 25 August 1960 – 1 October 1961 (Note: Subordinate units stationed at Elmendorf with wing headquarters, ecept as noted.)
- 626th Aircraft Control and Warning Squadron, 1 August 1960 – 1 October 1961

Fire Island Air Force Station, Alaska

- 705th Aircraft Control and Warning Squadron, 1 August 1960 – 1 October 1961

King Salmon Airport, Alaska

- 708th Aircraft Control and Warning Squadron, 1 August 1960 – 1 October 1961

Indian Mountain Air Force Station, Alaska

- 709th Aircraft Control and Warning Squadron, 1 August 1960 – 1 October 1961

Fort Yukon Air Force Station, Alaska

- 710th Aircraft Control and Warning Squadron, 1 August 1960 – 1 October 1961

Tin City Air Force Station, Alaska

- 711th Aircraft Control and Warning Squadron, 1 August 1960 – 1 October 1961

Cape Lisburne Air Force Station, Alaska

- 712th Aircraft Control and Warning Squadron, 1 August 1960 – 1 October 1961

Northeast Cape Air Force Station, Alaska

- 713th Aircraft Control and Warning Squadron, 1 August 1960 – 1 October 1961

Bethel Air Force Station, Alaska

- 714th Aircraft Control and Warning Squadron, 1 August 1960 – 1 October 1961

Cold Bay Air Force Station, Alaska

- 717th Aircraft Control and Warning Squadron, 1 August 1960 – 1 October 1961

Tatalina Air Force Station, Alaska

- 718th Aircraft Control and Warning Squadron, 1 August 1960 – 1 October 1961

Unalakleet Air Force Station, Alaska

- 719th Aircraft Control and Warning Squadron, 1 August 1960 – 1 October 1961

Sparrevohn Air Force Station, Alaska

- 720th Aircraft Control and Warning Squadron, 1 August 1960 – 1 October 1961

Middleton Island Air Force Station, Alaska

- 743d Aircraft Control and Warning Squadron, 1 August 1960 – 1 October 1961

Campion Air Force Station, Alaska

- 744th Aircraft Control and Warning Squadron, 1 August 1960 – 1 October 1961

Murphy Dome Air Force Station, Alaska

- 748th Aircraft Control and Warning Squadron, 1 August 1960 – 1 October 1961

Kotzebue Air Force Station, Alaska

- 794th Aircraft Control and Warning Squadron, 1 August 1960 – 1 October 1961

Cape Newenham Air Force Station, Alaska

- 795th Aircraft Control and Warning Squadron, 1 August 1960 – 1 October 1961

Cape Romanzof Air Force Station, Alaska

- 937th Aircraft Control and Warning Squadron, 1 August 1960 – 1 October 1961

Ohlson Mountain Air Force Station, Alaska

- 5070th Radar Evaluation Squadron (later 5070th Defense Systems Evaluation Squadron), 1 August 1960 – 1 October 1961

=== Stations ===
- Elmendorf Air Force Base, Alaska, 1 August 1960 – 1 October 1961

=== Aircraft ===
- Convair F-102 Delta Dagger, 1960–1961
- Martin EB-57 Canberra, 1960–1961

== See also ==
- List of MAJCOM wings
