= Tatalina Air Force Station =

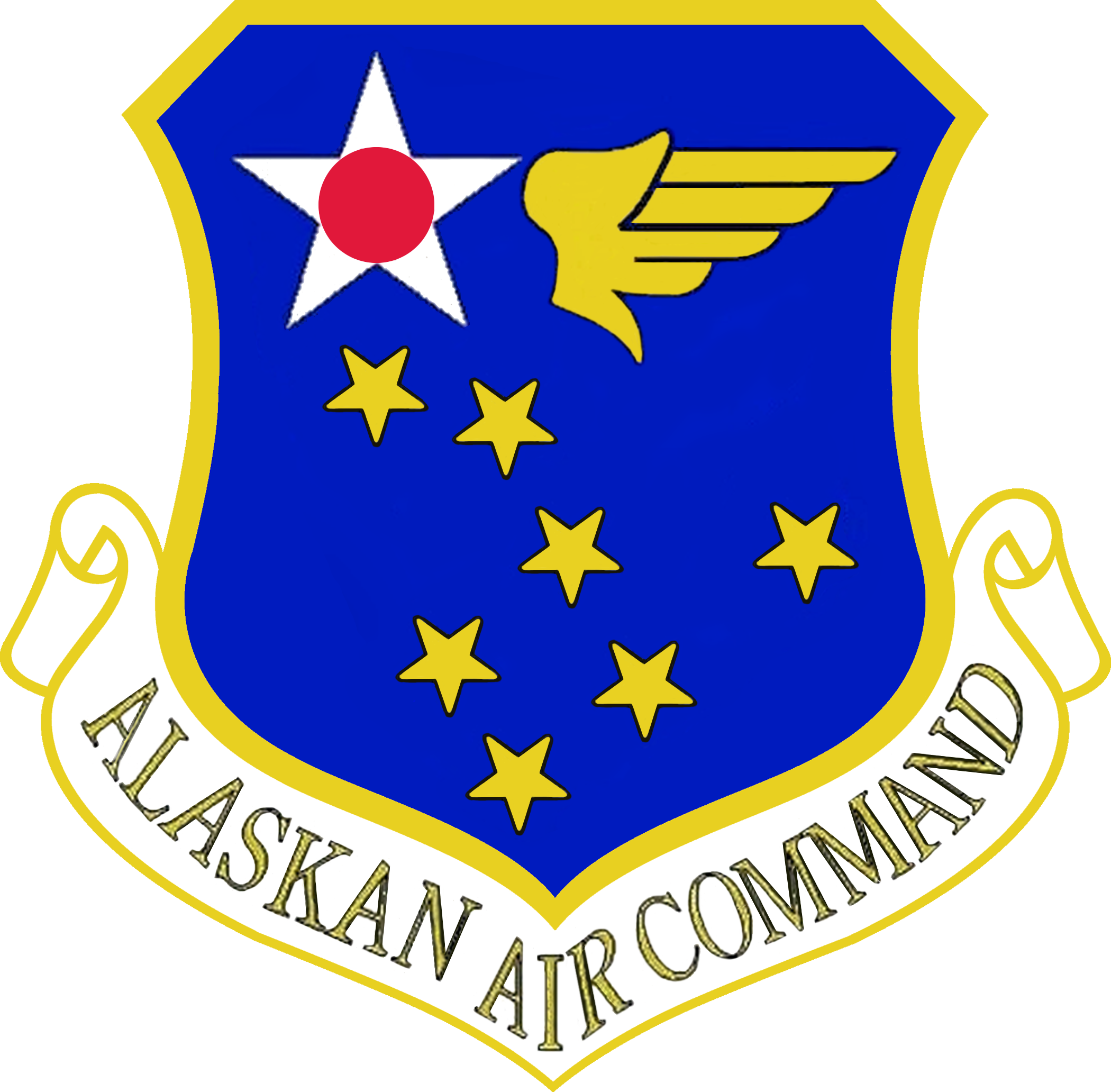
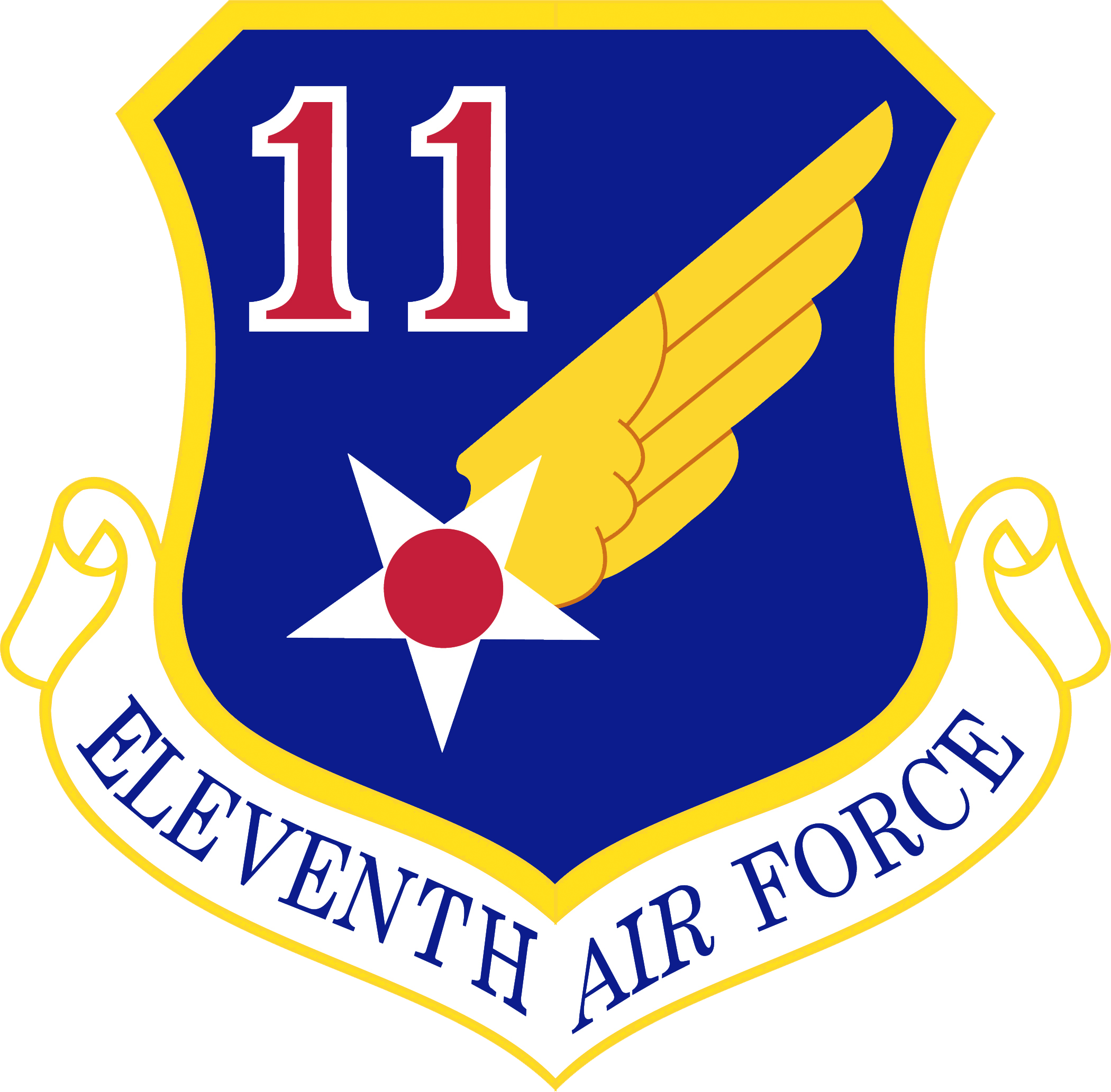
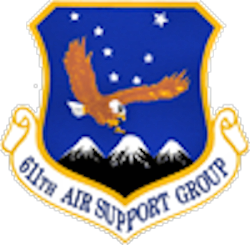
Tatalina Air Force Station Tatalina Long Range Radar Site
- Part of Eleventh Air Force (PACAF)
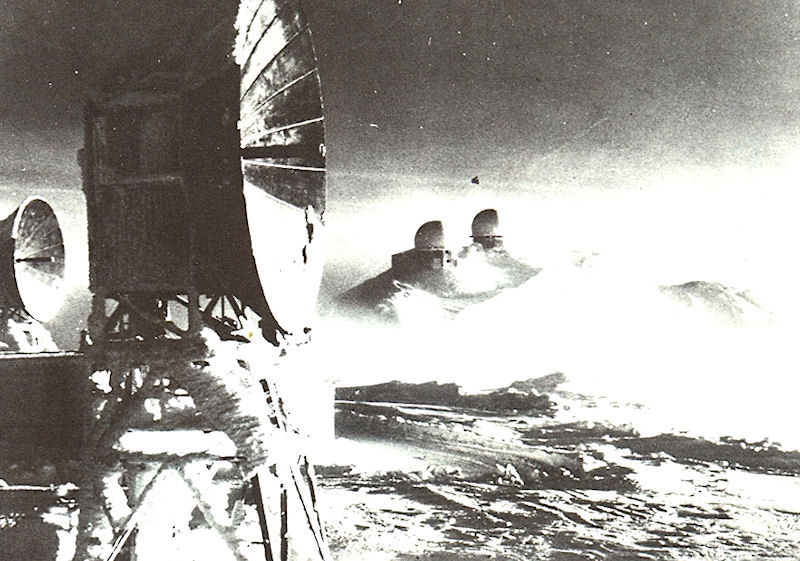
- Tatalina Air Force Station in winter

Site information
- Type: Air Force Station
- Controlled by: United States Air Force

Location
- Location of Tatalina AFS, Alaska
- Coordinates: 62°55′44″N 156°00′51″W

Site history
- Built: 1952
- In use: 1952-Present

Garrison information
- Garrison: 717th Aircraft Control and Warning Squadron (1952-1983)

Tatalina Air Force Station (AAC ID: F-10, LRR ID: A-05) is a closed United States Air Force General Surveillance Radar station. It is located 13 miles (21 km) west-southwest of McGrath, Alaska.

The ground control intercept (GCI) station was closed on 1 November 1983, and was redesignated as a Long Range Radar (LRR) site as part of the Alaska Radar System. Today, it remains active as part of the Alaska NORAD Region under the jurisdiction of the 611th Air Support Group, Elmendorf AFB, Alaska.

== History ==
Tatalina AFS was a continental defense radar station constructed to provide the United States Air Force early warning of an attack by the Soviet Union on Alaska.

Construction of the station began in 1950 and was completed in April 1952. The Army Transportation Corps undertook the project, which was originally named Takotna after the mountain on which it was built. The radar station site was located on the summit at 3,500 feet (1,100 m) of elevation (top camp), with a ground support station in a valley at the base at 1,200 feet (370 m), at 62°54′51″N 156°00′54″W. Access to the radars was initially by a road built up the side of the mountain, and later a cable tramway was built. The tramway cables constantly broke because of high winds and ice, and fog and the extreme cold made repairs hazardous. Ice 16 inches thick built up on the cables in winter.

Army engineers constructed a 3,800-foot (1,200 m) gravel runway airstrip at 62°53′44″N 155°58′43″W, about 2 miles (3.2 km) southeast of the base station on a 1,000-foot (300 m) plateau, and an access road to a river port facility on the Kuskokwim River (62°51′55″N 155°39′59″W) where barges brought in construction supplies, materiel and other equipment to be brought to the site.

The station consisted of a power/heating plant, water and fuel storage tanks, a gymnasium, and other support office buildings. Two other buildings contained living quarters, work areas, and recreational facilities plus opportunities for such sports as skiing, skating, horseshoes, and basketball. The station buildings were connected by heated hallways, except for the civil engineering building. As a result, personnel stationed there, with only very few exceptions, were able to wear "summer" uniforms year round, unless they had a need to go outside during the winter season. The coverings of the station's three radar towers were heated from within to keep the covering from becoming brittle from extreme cold and thus subject to being damaged or destroyed by high winds. Military tours durations at the station were limited to one year because of the psychological strain and physical hardships.

The 717th Aircraft Control and Warning Squadron (AC&W Sq) operated AN/FPS-3 AN/FPS-20, and AN/FPS-6 radars at the top site. The top site was a mini-station by itself, where twelve airmen lived: two for radio maintenance, nine for radar maintenance, and a cook. Barracks were connected between the radomes. Between the domes were other barracks rooms and the dayroom/library/kitchen/movie theater.

Tatalina AFS operated as a Ground Control Intercept (GCI) and warning station. As a GCI station, the squadron's role was to guide interceptor aircraft stationed at Ladd AFB toward unidentified intruders picked up on the unit's radar scopes. In March 1953, the Manual Air Defense Direction Center (MCC) at Murphy Dome AFS near Fairbanks exercised control over Kotzebue's radars where the data was analyzed to determine range, direction altitude speed and whether or not aircraft were friendly or hostile.

Communications were initially provided by a high frequency radio system which proved unreliable because of atmospheric disturbances. The Alaskan Air Command, after investigating various options, decided to build the White Alice Communications System, a system of Air Force-owned tropospheric scatter and microwave radio relay sites operated by the Air Force Communications Service (AFCS). The Tatalina site (62°55′40″N 156°01′29″W) was activated in 1957. It was inactivated in 1979, and replaced by an Alascom owned and operated satellite earth terminal as part of an Air Force plan to divest itself of the obsolete White Alice Communications System and transfer the responsibility to a commercial firm.

Over the years, the equipment at the station was upgraded or modified to improve the efficiency and accuracy of the information gathered by the radars. In 1983, Tatalina received a new AN/FPS-117 minimally attended radar under Alaskan Air Command's SEEK IGLOO program. It was designed to transmit aircraft tracking data via satellite to the Alaskan NORAD Regional Operations Control Center (ROCC) at Elmendorf AFB.

No longer needed, the 717th AC&W Sq was inactivated on 1 November 1983 and the station redesignated as a Long Range Radar (LRR) Site. This left only contractor personnel to maintain the site radar. In 1990, jurisdiction of the Tatalina LRR Site was transferred to Pacific Air Forces (PACAF)'s Eleventh Air Force with the redesignation of AAC.

In 1998 PACAF initiated "Operation Clean Sweep", in which abandoned Cold War stations in Alaska were remediated and the land restored to its previous state. After years of neglect when the site was closed, the facilities at the station had lost any value they had. The site remediation was carried out by the 611th Civil Engineering Squadron at Elmendorf AFB, and remediation work was completed by 2005.

== Demographics ==
Historical population
Census	Pop.	Note	%±
1980	46		—
U.S. Decennial Census

Tatalina Air Force Station appeared once on the 1980 U.S. Census as a census-designated place (CDP). With its closure in 1983, it did not appear again on the census.

== Current status ==
Today very little of the former Tatalina Air Force Station remains. The site is controlled by the PACAF 611th Air Support Group, based at Elmendorf AFB. Contractor access to the site to support the FPS-117 is by the Tatalina LRRS Airport. It is generally unattended; a few civilian contractors access the site for maintaining the facilities.

== Air Force units and assignments ==
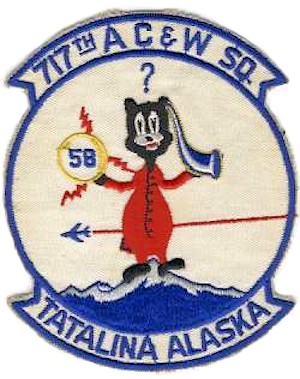
Emblem "A" of the 717th Aircraft Control and Warning Squadron

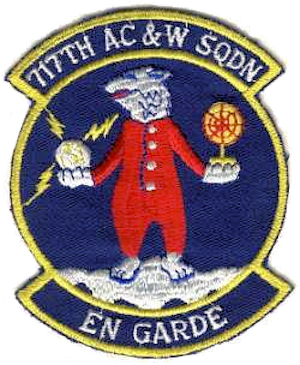
Emblem "B" of the 717th Aircraft Control and Warning Squadron

=== Units ===
- 717th Aircraft Control and Warning Squadron

Activated on 8 December 1952
Inactivated on 1 November 1983

=== Assignments ===
- 531st Aircraft Control and Warning Group, 8 December 1952
- 10th Air Division, 13 April 1953
- 5060th Aircraft Control and Warning Group, 1 November 1957
- 11th Air Division, 1 July 1959
- 5070th Air Defense Wing, 1 August 1960
- Alaskan Air Command, 1 November 1961
- 531st Aircraft Control and Warning Group (later 11th Tactical Control Group, 11th Tactical Control Wing, 11th Air Control Wing, 611th Air Operations Group, 611th Air and Space Operations Center) 15 July 1977

== See also ==
- Alaskan Air Command
- List of White Alice Communications System sites, a list of sites in the White Alice system
- Distant Early Warning Line
- Ballistic Missile Early Warning System
- Elmendorf Air Force Base Command site for the Air Force in Alaska
- Radio propagation
- Tropospheric scatter
- White Alice Communications System
