= King Salmon Long Range Radar Site =

US military site in Alaska

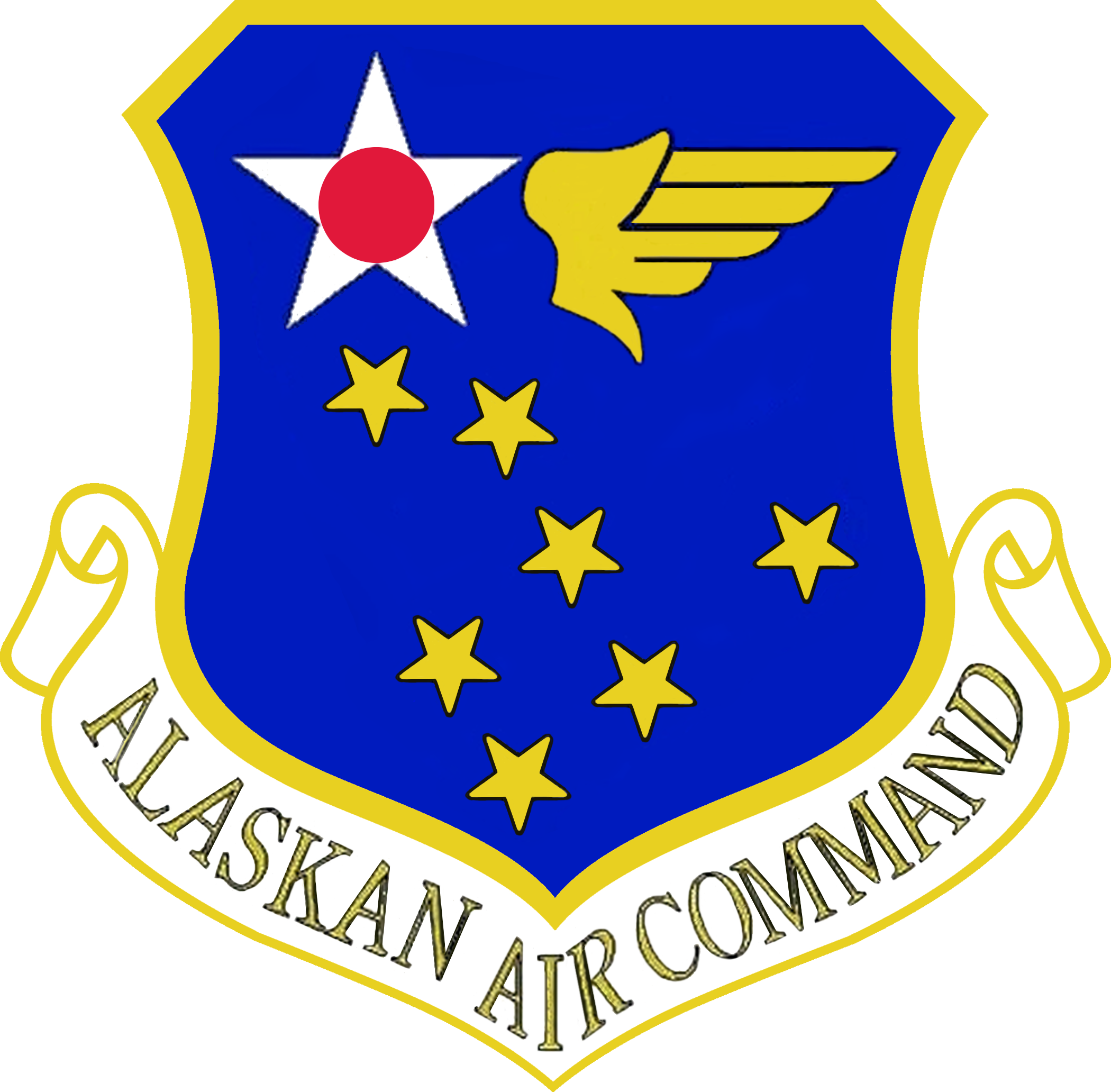
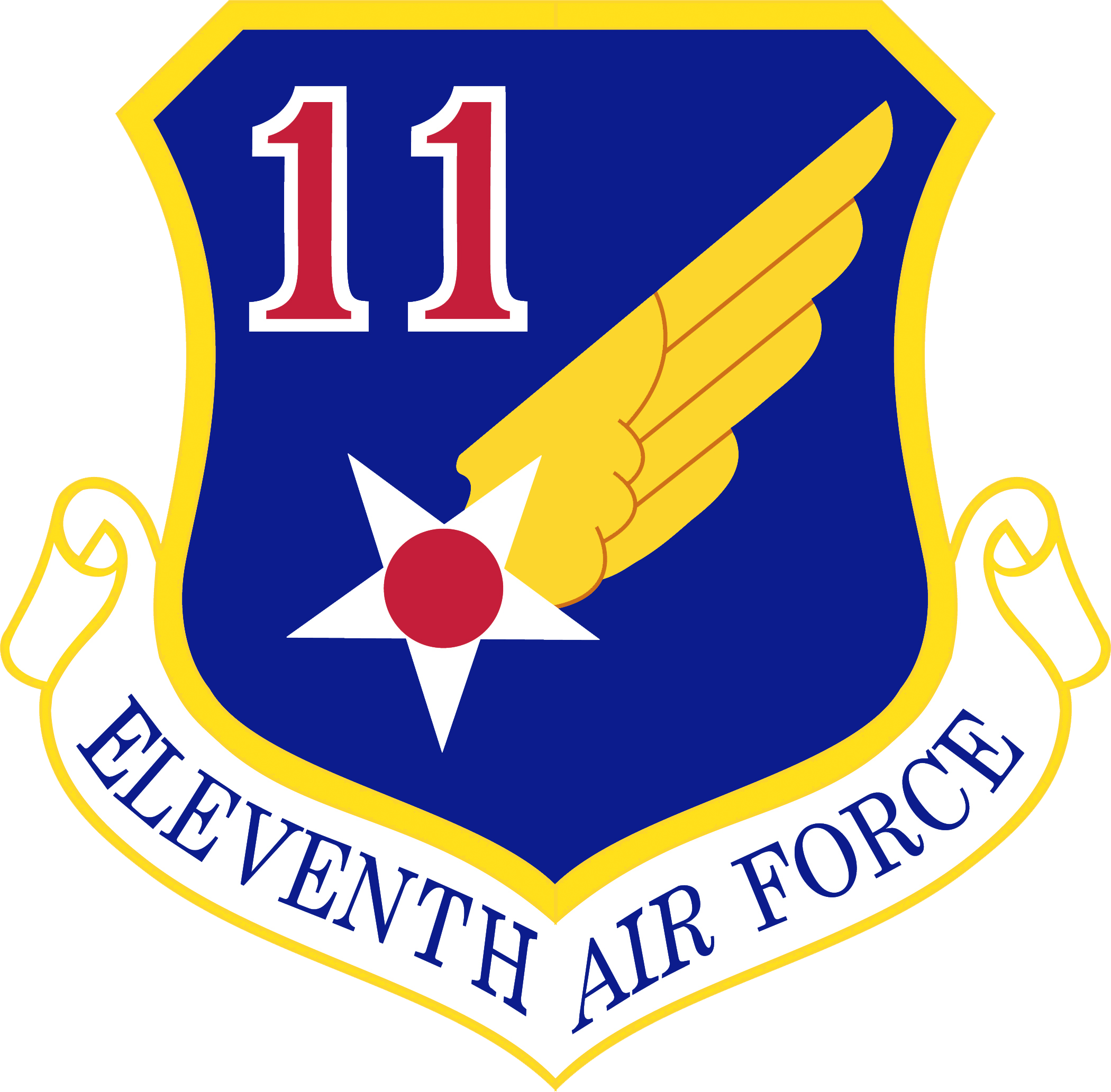
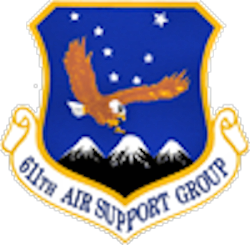
King Salmon Air Force Station King Salmon Long Range Radar Site
- Part of Eleventh Air Force (PACAF)

Site information
- Type: Air Force Station
- Controlled by: United States Air Force

Location
- Location of King Salmon AFS, Alaska
- Coordinates: 58°41′33″N 156°40′11″W

Site history
- Built: 1951
- In use: 1951-Present

Garrison information
- Garrison: 705th Aircraft Control and Warning Squadron (1951–1983)

King Salmon Air Force Station (AAC ID: F-03, LRR ID: A-07) is a closed United States Air Force General Surveillance Radar station. It is located 0.4 miles (0.64 km) west of King Salmon, Alaska.

The control center station was closed on 1 November 1983, and was re-designated as a Long Range Radar (LRR) site as part of the Alaska Radar System. Today, it remains active as part of the Alaska NORAD Region under the jurisdiction of the Pacific Air Forces Regional Support Center, Joint Base Elmendorf-Richardson, Alaska.

== History ==
King Salmon AFS was a continental defense radar station constructed to provide the United States Air Force early warning of an attack by the Soviet Union on Alaska. The Air Force awarded a contract to construct the radar site to Gaasland & Company on 12 April 1950. Construction began shortly afterward and was completed the following year at a cost of approximately $3,667,372.

King Salmon became operational as a ground controlled intercept (GCI) site in November 1951 and initially the station functioned as a GCI and warning station. As a GCI station, the squadron's role was to guide interceptor aircraft toward unidentified intruders picked up on the unit's radar scopes. Radars operated were am AN/FPS-3, AN/FPS-20A, AN/FPS-6, AN/CPS-5 (Bkup), and an AN/FPS-6B.

It converted to an Air Defense Direction Center (later renamed NORAD Control Center) on 4 March 1953, and exercised control over Cape Newenham AFS and Cape Romanzof AFS. Control of the other aircraft control and warning sites in the southern sector was transferred to King Salmon when the Fire Island AFS NORAD Control Center was closed in July 1969.

Initially, King Salmon AFS was maintained and operated by Detachment F-3, 531st Aircraft Control and Warning Group (AC&W Gp). In 1952, Alaskan Air Command (ACC) decided to upgrade all the aircraft control and warning detachments to squadrons. The 705th Aircraft Control and Warning Squadron was activated on 8 December 1952 and assigned to the 531st AC&W Gp. Following the Group's inactivation on 13 April 1953, the squadron was assigned to various other headquarters, including AAC. On 15 November 1977, the squadron was reassigned to the 531st AC&W Gp when the latter was reactivated at Elmendorf AFB. The Group was redesignated the 11th Tactical Control Group on 1 July 1981.

Communications were initially provided by a high frequency radio system which proved unreliable because of atmospheric disturbances. AAC, after investigating various options, decided to build the RCA Corporation's White Alice Communications System, a system of Air Force-owned tropospheric scatter and microwave radio relay sites operated by the Air Force Communications Service (AFCS). The AFCS's 1930 Comm Sq., Det. 2 operated and maintained the facility's communications including teletype, crypto, radar tracking, and the Ground Radio and Aircraft Radio at the site as well as the MARS (Military Affiliate Radio Service). Friendly, Foe, and Unidentified aircraft vector displays were projected on the over all map of Alaska in the Operations Room.

The King Salmon site 58°42′19″N 156°40′08″W was activated on 25 May 1957. It was inactivated on 3 August 1979, and replaced by an Alascom owned and operated satellite earth terminal as part of an Air Force plan to divest itself of the obsolete White Alice Communications System and transfer the responsibility to a commercial firm.

On 1 October 1977, AAC, after a trial period, implemented a base support contract with RCA Services as part of an Air Force-wide effort to reduce remote tours. Twenty-eight positions were eliminated. The remaining 63 positions were primarily in operations.

King Salmon was the first radar site to receive a new AN/FPS-117 minimally attended radar under AAC's "Seek Igloo" program. The unit, a prototype version, was tested at King Salmon in September 1982, then placed in 24-hour operation in December. It was designed to transmit aircraft tracking data via satellite to the Alaskan NORAD Regional Operations Control Center (ROCC), which reached initial operational capability on 15 June 1983. No longer needed, the 705 ACWS was inactivated on l November 1983 and the station re-designated as a Long Range Radar (LRR) Site. This left only contractor personnel to maintain the site radar. In 1990, jurisdiction of the King Salmon LRR Site was transferred to Pacific Air Forces' (PACAF) Eleventh Air Force with the redesignation of AAC.

In 1998 PACAF initiated "Operation Clean Sweep", in which abandoned Cold War stations in Alaska were remediated and the land restored to its previous state. After years of neglect the facilities at the station had lost any value they had when the site was closed. The site remediation of the radar and support station was carried out by the 611th Civil Engineering Squadron at Joint Base Elmendorf-Richardson, and remediation work was completed by 2005.

== Current status ==
Today, very little remains of the former King Salmon Air Force Station. The site is controlled by PACAF's Pacific Air Forces Regional Support Center, based at Joint Base Elmendorf-Richardson, Alaska. The site is generally unattended. Because of its proximity to King Salmon Airport (IATA: AKN, ICAO: PAKN, FAA LID: AKN), only two civilian contractor maintenance and support personnel are needed to maintain the radar system.

== Air Force units and assignments ==
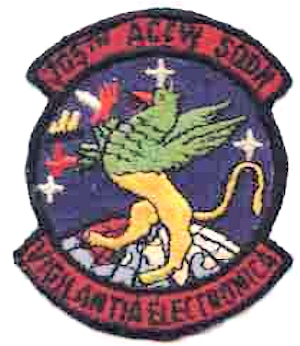
Emblem of the 705th Aircraft Control and Warning Squadron

=== Units ===
- 705th Aircraft Control and Warning Squadron

Activated on 1 November 1951
Inactivated on 1 November 1983

=== Assignments ===
- 531st Aircraft Control and Warning Group, 17 November 1951
- 10th Air Division, 13 April 1953
- 5039th Aircraft Control and Warning Group (later 5040th Aircraft Control and Warning Group, 1 June 1957
- 10th Air Division, 1 November 1959
- 5070th Air Defense Wing, 1 August 1960
- Alaskan Air Command, 1 November 1961
- 531st Aircraft Control and Warning Group (later 11th Tactical Control Group, 11th Tactical Control Wing, 11th Air Control Wing, 611th Air Operations Group, 611th Air and Space Operations Center) 15 July 1977

== See also ==
- Alaskan Air Command
