= Fort Yukon Long Range Radar Site =

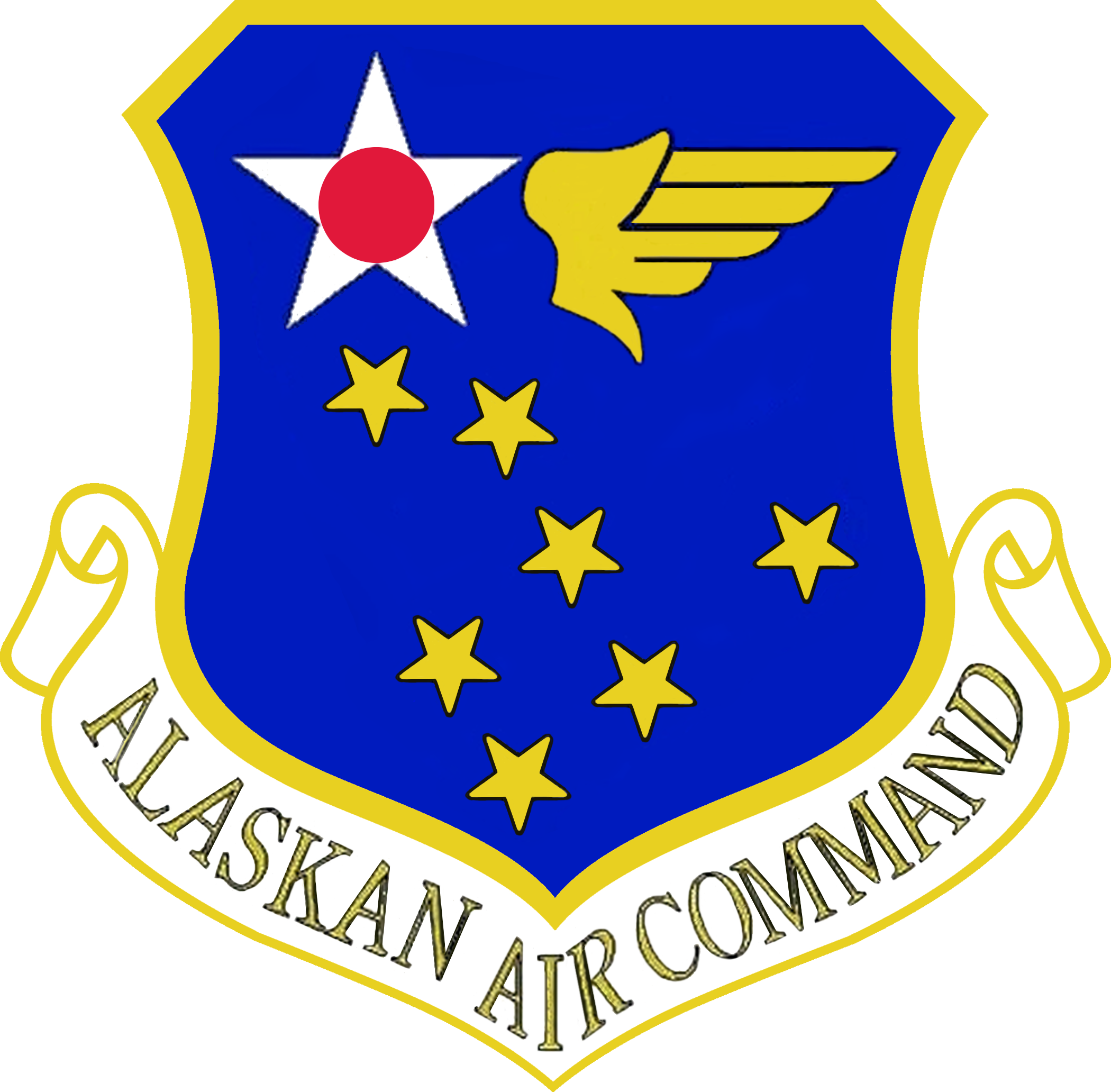
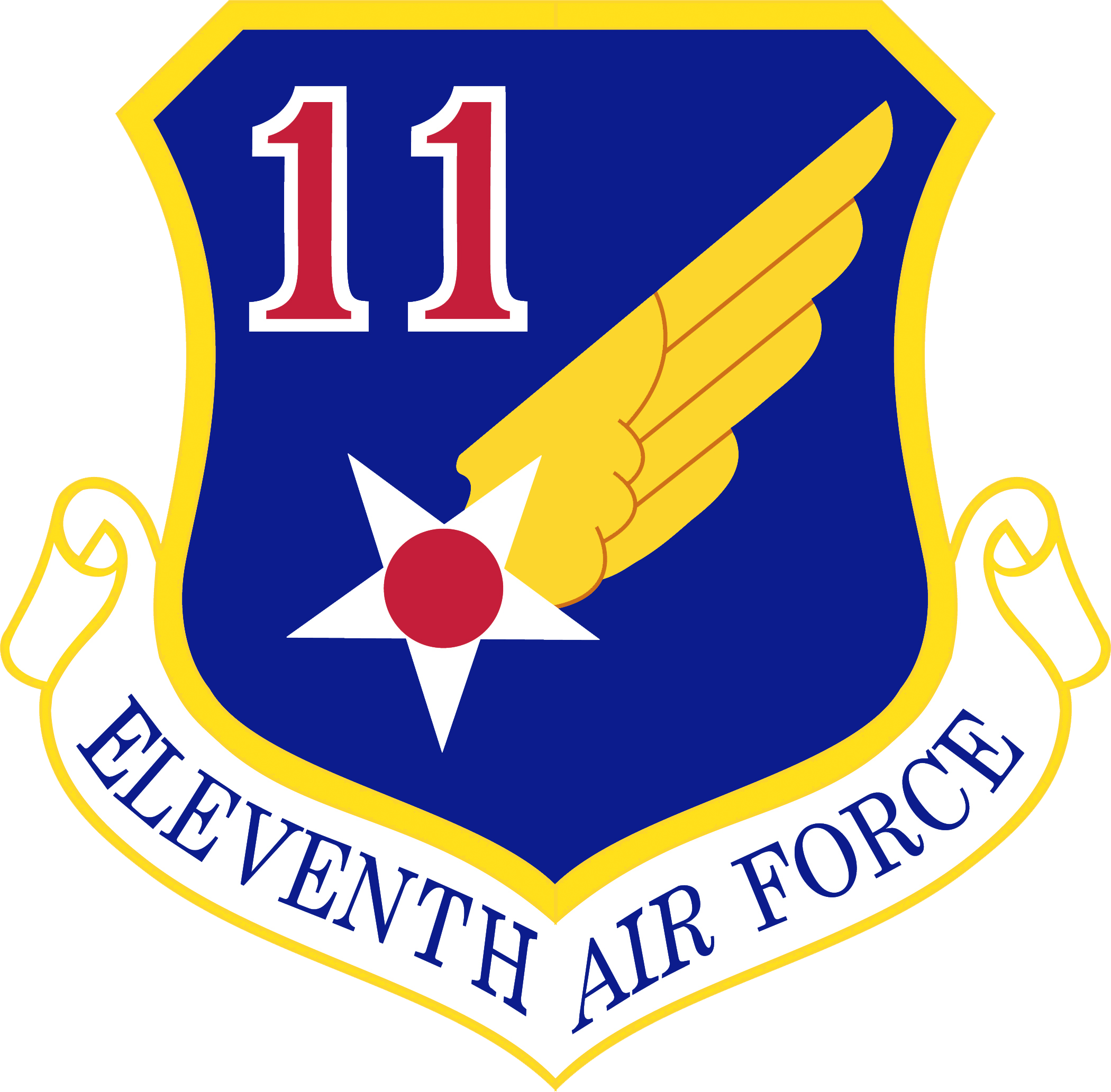
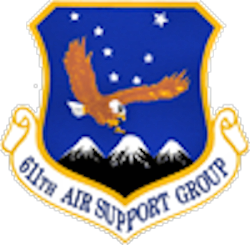
Fort Yukon Air Force Station Fort Yukon Long Range Radar Site
- Part of Eleventh Air Force (PACAF)
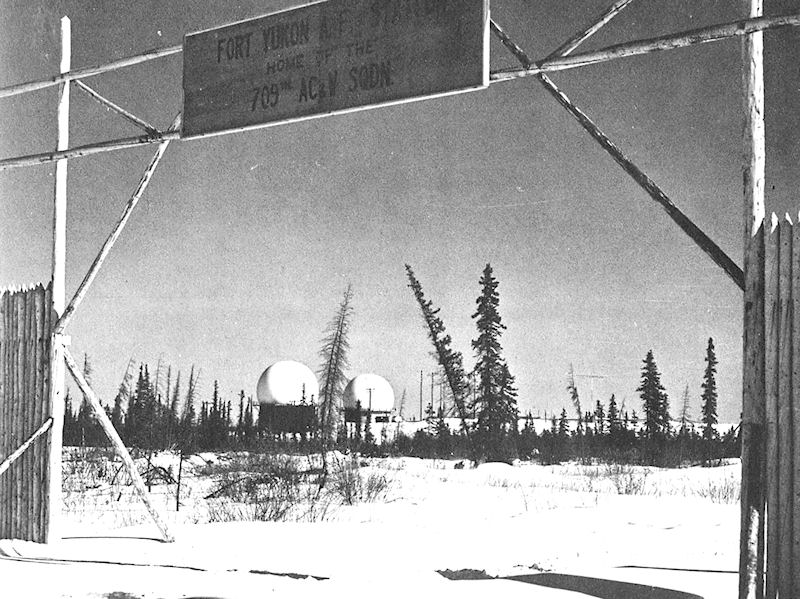
- Fort Yukon Air Force Station

Site information
- Type: Air Force Station
- Controlled by: United States Air Force

Location
- Location of Fort Yukon AFS, Alaska
- Coordinates: 66°33′39″N 145°12′34″W

Site history
- Built: 1958
- In use: 1958-Present

Garrison information
- Garrison: 709th Aircraft Control and Warning Squadron (1958-1983)

Fort Yukon Long Range Radar Site is a radar site of the United States Air Force. It is located 1.6 miles (2.6 km) east-southeast of Fort Yukon, Alaska.

It was the former Fort Yukon Air Force Station (AAC ID: F-14, LRR ID: A-01), a General Surveillance Radar station. The ground control intercept (GCI) station was closed on 1 November 1983, and was redesignated as a Long Range Radar (LRR) site as part of the Alaska Radar System. Today, it remains active as part of the Alaska NORAD Region under the jurisdiction of the 611th Air and Space Operations Center, Elmendorf AFB, Alaska.

== History ==
Fort Yukon AFS was a continental defence radar station constructed to provide the United States Air Force early warning of an attack by the Soviet Union on Alaska.

The station was opened in 1958 as a Ground-Control Intercept (GCI) and warning station, operated by the 709th Aircraft Control and Warning Squadron (AC&W Sq). The squadron operated AN/FPS-3, AN/FPS-20, and AN/FPS-6 radars.

As a GCI station, the squadron's initial role was to guide interceptor aircraft based at Ladd AFB near Fairbanks toward unidentified intruders picked up on the unit's radar scopes. Later, the station was redesignated as a radar surveillance station, with the squadron providing information 24/7 the Direction Center at Murphy Dome AFS where it was analyzed to determine range, direction altitude speed and whether or not aircraft were friendly or hostile.

The station was known to be the coldest radar station in Alaska, with temperatures sinking as low as -70 degrees Fahrenheit during the winter. Due to the extreme temperatures, most of the site's operations were housed indoors, in a large composite structure consisting of a power/heating plant, water and fuel storage tanks, gymnasium and other support office buildings. Two other buildings contained living quarters, work areas, and recreational facilities plus opportunities for such sports as skiing, skating, horseshoes, and basketball. The buildings were connected by enclosed portals so no one needed to go outside in winter unless absolutely necessary. Tours at the station were limited to one year because of the psychological strain and physical hardships. Mail was usually delivered twice a week. The inaccessibility made the personnel at the site responsible for maintenance if anything went wrong. Water mains occasionally froze and ruptured.

Communications were initially provided by a high frequency radio system which proved unreliable because of atmospheric disturbances. The Alaskan Air Command, after investigating various options, decided to build the White Alice Communications System, a system of Air Force-owned tropospheric scatter and microwave radio relay sites operated by the Air Force Communications Service (AFCS). The Fort Yukon site 66°33′19″N 145°12′13″W was activated in 1957. It was inactivated in 1979, and replaced by an Alascom owned and operated satellite earth terminal as part of an Air Force plan to divest itself of the obsolete White Alice Communications System and transfer the responsibility to a commercial firm.

Over the years, the equipment at the station was upgraded or modified to improve the efficiency and accuracy of the information gathered by the radars. In 1983, Fort Yukon AFS received a new AN/FPS-117 minimally attended radar under Alaskan Air Command's SEEK IGLOO program. It was designed to transmit aircraft tracking data via satellite to the Alaskan NORAD Regional Operations Control Center (ROCC) at Elmendorf AFB.

No longer needed, the 709th AC&W Sq was inactivated on l November 1983 and the station re-designated as a Long Range Radar (LRR) Site. In 1990, jurisdiction of the Fort Yukon LRR Site was transferred to Eleventh Air Force with the re-designation of AAC.

In 1998 Pacific Air Forces (PACAF) initiated "Operation Clean Sweep", in which abandoned Cold War stations in Alaska were remediated and the land restored to its previous state. After years of neglect the facilities at the station had lost any value they had when the site was closed. The site remediation of the radar, support and White Alice communication station was carried out by the 611th Civil Engineering Squadron at Elmendorf AFB, and remediation work was completed by 2005.

== Current status ==
Today very little of the former Fort Yukon Air Force Station remains. The site is controlled by the PACAF's 611th Air Support Group, based at Elmendorf AFB. The site is supported by a few civilian contractors who access the site by the Fort Yukon Airport (ICAO: PAYU, TC LID: FYU) and monitor the system.

== Air Force units and assignments ==
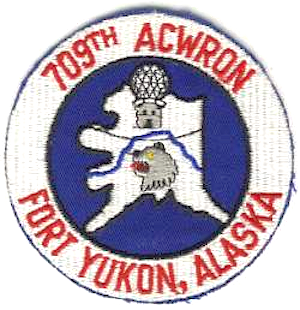
Emblem of the 709th Aircraft Control and Warning Squadron

=== Units ===
- 709th Aircraft Control and Warning Squadron

Activated, ca. 1 Nov 1957
Inactivated, 1 Nov 1983

=== Assignments ===
- 5060th Aircraft Control and Warning Group, 1 November 1957
- 11th Air Division, ca. 1 July 1959
- 5070th Air Defense Wing, 1 August 1960
- Alaskan Air Command, 1 November 1961
- 531st Aircraft Control and Warning Group (later 11th Tactical Control Group, 11th Tactical Control Wing, 11th Air Control Wing, 611th Air Operations Group, 611th Air and Space Operations Center) 15 July 1977
