= Cape Newenham Long Range Radar Site =

US Air Force General Surveillance Radar station in Alaska

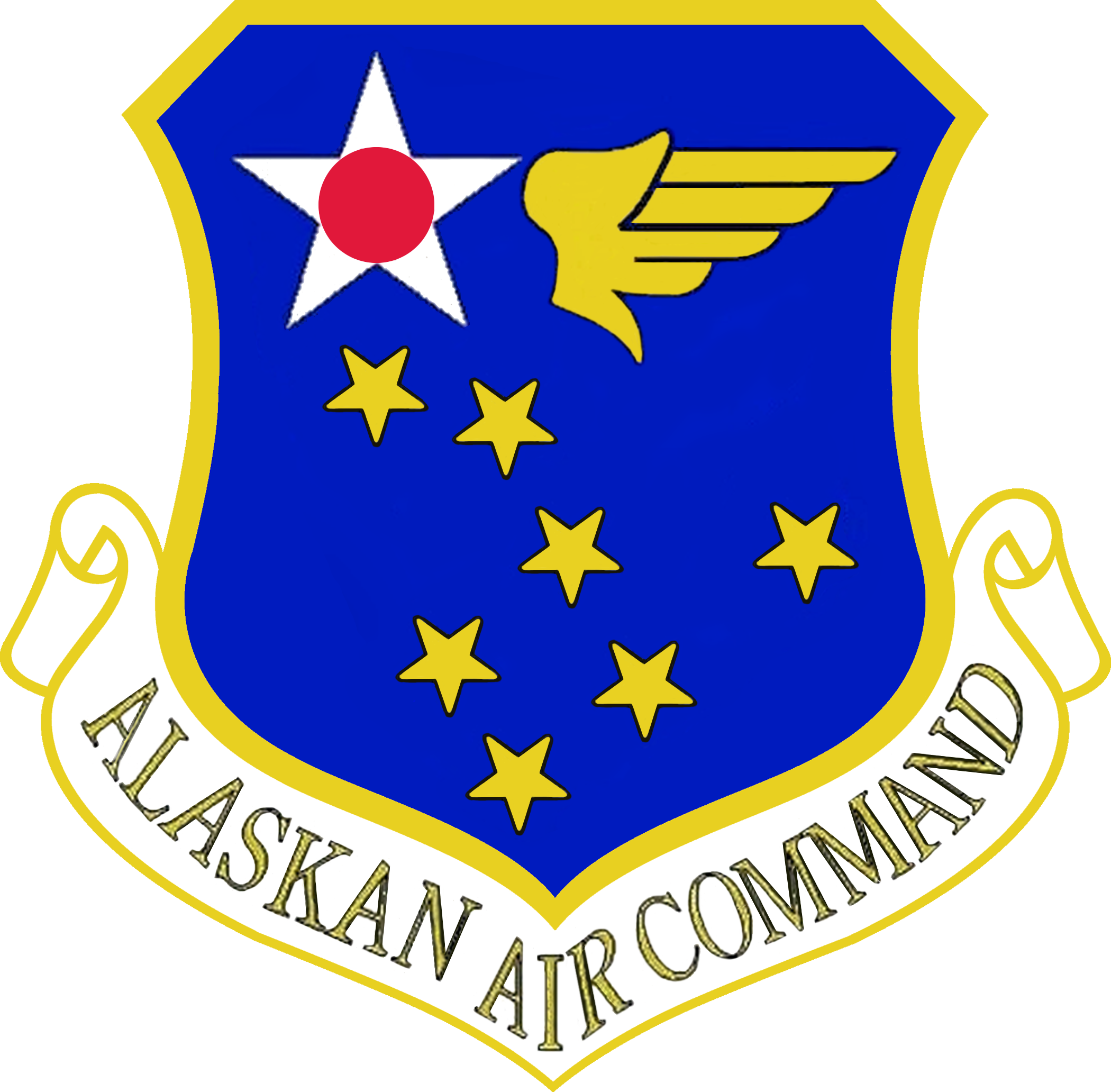
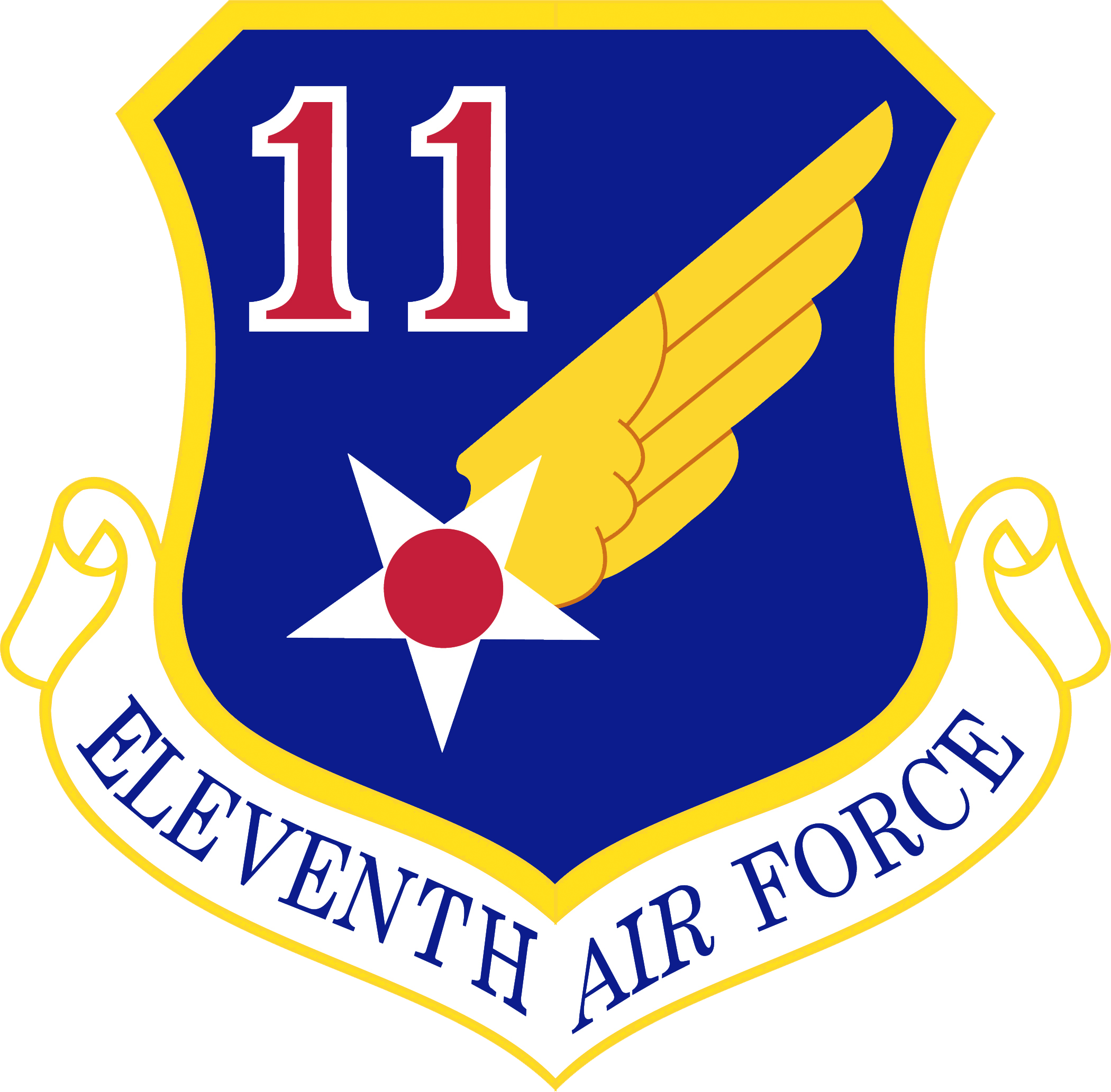
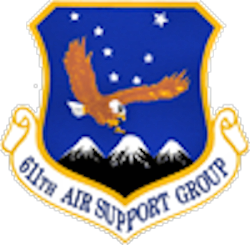
Cape Newenham Air Force Station Cape Newenham Long Range Radar Site
- Part of Eleventh Air Force (PACAF)

Site information
- Type: Air Force Station
- Controlled by: United States Air Force

Location
- Location of Cape Newenham AFS, Alaska
- Coordinates: 58°37′36″N 162°04′34″W

Site history
- Built: 1951
- In use: 1954-Present

Garrison information
- Garrison: 794th Aircraft Control and Warning Squadron (1954-1983)

Cape Newenham Air Force Station (AAC ID: F-05, LRR ID: A-09) is a United States Air Force General Surveillance Radar station. It is located 67.5 miles (108.6 km) west-southwest of Togiak, Alaska.

The radar was upgraded on 1 November 1983, and was re-designated as a Long Range Radar (LRR) site as part of the Alaska Radar System. Today, it remains active as part of the Alaska NORAD Region under the jurisdiction of the 611th Air Support Group, Elmendorf AFB, Alaska. The normal complement of civilian personnel includes two Station Mechanics, one Services Technician and one Radar Technician. There are no USAF personnel stationed at the radar sites, but they visit occasionally to perform inspections.

== History ==
Cape Newenham AFS was a continental defence radar station constructed to provide the United States Air Force early warning of an attack by the Soviet Union on Alaska.

A construction contract was awarded to Haddock Engineers, Ltd., on 13 June 1950. Work was started on 12 September, and considerable construction difficulties ensued. The only means of getting construction materials and supplies to the site was by barge or Navy LSTs, however this was restricted to when the sea was not frozen and had to be unloaded 2.2 miles (3.5 km) north from the proposed site 58°39′32″N 162°04′12″W. Initially, there were no roads, which had to be built as part of the construction effort.

The site became operational in April 1954, two years behind schedule. Cape Newenham was initially maintained by Detachment F-5, 531st Aircraft Control and Warning Group (AC&W Gp). In 1952, Alaskan Air Command (AAC) decided to upgrade the detachments to squadrons. The 794th Aircraft Control and Warning Squadron (AC&W Sq) was activated on 8 December 1952 with 107 military personnel authorized. However, due to delays in construction, the squadron operated at limited manning until the site became operational.

The station 58°38′12″N 162°03′42″W had its main camp in a valley between peaks. Recreational features included hobby shops and recreation rooms, plus opportunities for such sports as skiing, skating, horseshoes, and basketball. The buildings were connected by enclosed portals so no one needed to go outside in winter unless absolutely necessary. Tours at the station were limited to one year because of the psychological strain and physical hardships. Mail was usually delivered twice a week. The station had a tramway connecting the base station with the radar antennas located on a mountain peak at 2,300 feet. The tramway cables were constantly breaking because of high winds and ice, and fog and the extreme cold made repairs hazardous. Ice 16 inches thick built up on the cables in winter. A new riblet type tramway was installed in 1962.

Cape Newenham AFS was originally equipped with an AN/FPS-3 Search Radar which was later modified as the AN/FPS-93A Search Radar. The station provided information 24/7 to the air defense Direction Center at King Salmon AFS where it was analyzed to determine range, direction altitude speed and whether or not aircraft were friendly or hostile. An AN/FYQ-9 Semiautomatic Data Processing and Display System was installed and became operational in July 1965, eliminating the need to pass track data manually.

Cape Newenham AFS was resupplied annually since 1950 by sealift. Bulk cargo was delivered across the beach in landing craft, while fuel was pumped ashore to storage tanks. It was part of the annual Cool Barge remote resupply operations originally known as Mona Lisa. The name was changed to Cool Barge in 1967. A runway was built in 1952 58°38′54″N 162°03′50″W,1.6 miles (2.6 km) north-northeast to facilitate the transportation of personnel and critical cargo.

The squadron was assigned to various headquarters, including AAC. On 15 October 1977, the squadron was reassigned from Headquarters, AAC to the 531st AC&W Gp upon the reactivation of the latter. The Group was redesignated the 11th Tactical Control Group on 1 July 1981.

Communications were initially provided by a high frequency radio system which proved unreliable because of atmospheric disturbances. The Alaskan Air Command, after investigating various options, decided to build the White Alice Communications System, a system of Air Force-owned tropospheric scatter and microwave radio relay sites operated by the Air Force Communications Service (AFCS). The Cape Newenham site 58°39′00″N 162°02′08″W was activated in December 1957. It was inactivated in March 1979, and replaced by an Alascom owned and operated satellite earth terminal as part of an Air Force plan to divest itself of the obsolete White Alice Communications System and transfer the responsibility to a commercial firm.

Construction of a composite building was begun in late 1975. The $11.7 million facility was accepted by the Alaska District Corps of Engineers in October 1980. However, occupancy was delayed until July 1981 because of safety deficiencies and changes in design.

On 1 October 1977, AAC, after a trial period, implemented a site support contract with RCA Services as part of an Air Force-wide effort to reduce remote tours. Eighty military positions were deleted. The remaining 14 were primarily in operations. Over the years, the equipment at the station was upgraded or modified to improve the efficiency and accuracy of the information gathered by the radars. In 1983, Cape Newenham received a new AN/FPS-117 minimally attended radar under Alaskan Air Command's SEEK IGLOO program. It was designed to transmit aircraft tracking data via satellite to the Alaskan NORAD Regional Operations Control Center (ROCC) at Elmendorf AFB.

No longer needed, the 794th AC&W Sq was inactivated on 1 November 1983 and the station redesignated as a Long Range Radar (LRR) Site. This left only contractor personnel to maintain the site radar. The composite building was modified to house personnel and equipment, and the other facilities were disposed of. In 1990, jurisdiction of the Cape Newenham LRR Site was transferred to Eleventh Air Force with the re-designation of AAC.

In 1998 Pacific Air Forces initiated "Operation Clean Sweep", in which abandoned Cold War stations in Alaska were remediated and the land restored to its previous state. After years of neglect the facilities at the station had lost any value they had when the site was closed. The site remediation of the radar, support and White Alice communication station was carried out by the 611th Civil Engineering Squadron at Elmendorf AFB, and remediation work was completed by 2005.

== Demographics ==
Historical population
Census	Pop.	Note	%±
1980	43		—
U.S. Decennial Census

Cape Newenham (Station) appeared once, on the 1980 U.S. Census, as a census-designated place (CDP), just prior to its closure. It has not appeared on the census since.

== Current status ==
Today very little of the former Cape Newenham Air Force Station remains. It is controlled by the Pacific Air Forces 611th Air Support Group, based at Elmendorf AFB. The site is generally unattended; a few civilian contractor maintenance personnel needed for continued operation access the site by the Cape Newenham LRRS Airport (ICAO: PAEH, TC LID: EHM) when needed to maintain the radar system.

== Climate ==
Cape Newenham has the typical subarctic climate of most of Alaska, though owing to the maritime influence of the Bering Sea it borders on a polar climate despite receiving an amount of precipitation one would expect more of an oceanic location.

Climate data for Cape Newenham (1961–1990 normals, extremes 1953–1984)
Month	Jan	Feb	Mar	Apr	May	Jun	Jul	Aug	Sep	Oct	Nov	Dec	Year
Record high °F (°C)	50 (10)	50 (10)	48 (9)	47 (8)	68 (20)	66 (19)	75 (24)	67 (19)	66 (19)	55 (13)	50 (10)	50 (10)	75 (24)
Mean maximum °F (°C)	40.3 (4.6)	38.0 (3.3)	39.7 (4.3)	41.9 (5.5)	53.4 (11.9)	59.9 (15.5)	64.0 (17.8)	61.8 (16.6)	56.9 (13.8)	48.6 (9.2)	42.4 (5.8)	40.8 (4.9)	65.0 (18.3)
Mean daily maximum °F (°C)	23.9 (−4.5)	22.0 (−5.6)	26.4 (−3.1)	31.7 (−0.2)	41.0 (5.0)	49.3 (9.6)	53.2 (11.8)	53.2 (11.8)	49.2 (9.6)	39.0 (3.9)	30.8 (−0.7)	25.5 (−3.6)	37.2 (2.9)
Daily mean °F (°C)	19.2 (−7.1)	16.8 (−8.4)	22.2 (−5.4)	27.2 (−2.7)	37.3 (2.9)	45.3 (7.4)	49.7 (9.8)	50.3 (10.2)	46.7 (8.2)	35.5 (1.9)	29.0 (−1.7)	20.5 (−6.4)	33.3 (0.7)
Mean daily minimum °F (°C)	14.7 (−9.6)	12.9 (−10.6)	17.2 (−8.2)	23.5 (−4.7)	33.3 (0.7)	41.3 (5.2)	45.8 (7.7)	47.0 (8.3)	43.3 (6.3)	33.0 (0.6)	23.8 (−4.6)	16.4 (−8.7)	29.5 (−1.4)
Mean minimum °F (°C)	−8.1 (−22.3)	−8.6 (−22.6)	−3.1 (−19.5)	8.6 (−13.0)	24.1 (−4.4)	34.6 (1.4)	40.8 (4.9)	43.0 (6.1)	35.7 (2.1)	19.9 (−6.7)	9.3 (−12.6)	−4.4 (−20.2)	−15.3 (−26.3)
Record low °F (°C)	−22 (−30)	−28 (−33)	−21 (−29)	−6 (−21)	15 (−9)	29 (−2)	36 (2)	39 (4)	28 (−2)	9 (−13)	−9 (−23)	−19 (−28)	−28 (−33)
Average precipitation inches (mm)	1.83 (46)	1.17 (30)	1.47 (37)	1.54 (39)	2.19 (56)	2.79 (71)	3.65 (93)	5.06 (129)	4.94 (125)	4.62 (117)	3.40 (86)	2.19 (56)	34.84 (885)
Average snowfall inches (cm)	12.4 (31)	8.4 (21)	9.7 (25)	9.0 (23)	3.5 (8.9)	0.0 (0.0)	0.0 (0.0)	0.0 (0.0)	trace	4.6 (12)	10.7 (27)	11.3 (29)	69.6 (177)
Average precipitation days (≥ 0.01 inch)	13.3	11.2	14.1	14.4	11.6	12.7	15.1	18.6	19.4	17.9	17.1	15.5	180.9
Average snowy days (≥ 0.1 inch)	10.9	10.1	12.3	12.5	5.1	0.1	0.0	0.0	0.1	6.1	12.3	13.5	83.0
Source 1: WRCC
Source 2: XMACIS (snowfall)

== Air Force units and assignments ==
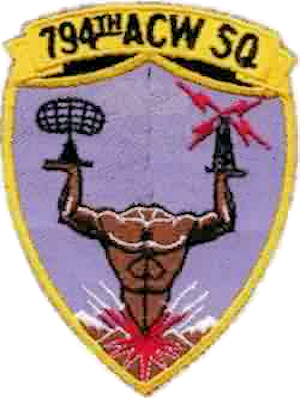
Emblem of the 794th Aircraft Control and Warning Squadron

=== Units ===
- Constituted as the 794th Aircraft Control and Warning Squadron on 3 November 1952
- Activated on 8 December 1952
- Inactivated on 1 November 1983

=== Assignments ===
- 531st Aircraft Control and Warning Group, 8 December 1952
- 10th Air Division, 13 April 1953
- 5039th Aircraft Control and Warning Group (later 5050th Aircraft Control, 1 June 1957
- 10th Air Division, 1 November 1959
- 5070th Air Defense Wing, 1 August 1960
- Alaskan Air Command, 1 November 1961
- 531st Aircraft Control and Warning Group (later 11th Tactical Control Group, 11th Tactical Control Wing), 15 November 1977 - 1 November 1983

== See also ==
- Alaskan Air Command
- List of United States Air Force aircraft control and warning squadrons
