= Pacific Air Forces Regional Support Center =

PACAF Regional Support Center
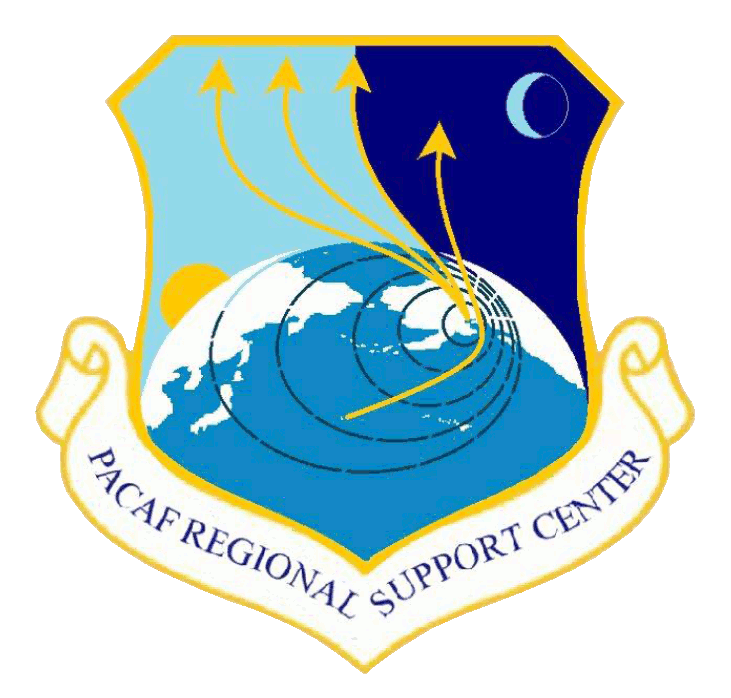
- Pacific Air Forces Regional Support Center
- Country: United States
- Branch: United States Air Force
- Garrison/HQ: Joint Base Elmendorf-Richardson, Alaska
- Motto: Eyes of the Kill Chain!

Commanders
- Current commander: Col Timothy "Steiner" Meerstein (July 2024-Present)
- Notable commanders: Col Breanna D. Fulton (July 2022-July 2024)

The Pacific Air Forces Regional Support Center, formerly the 611th Air Support Group, is a United States Air Force unit. It is assigned to the Eleventh Air Force, stationed at Joint Base Elmendorf-Richardson, Alaska.

The center is responsible for the program management, operation, and quality assurance of the Alaska Radar System, consisting of 17 long-range and 3 short-range radar sites; the forward operation locations at Galena Airport, King Salmon Airport, and Eareckson Air Station; project management for future radar and communications systems; and logistics staff for 11th Air Force and the Alaska NORAD Region.

From October 1, 2010, the 611th Air Support Group added eight tropical locations in the Pacific to the sites it managed around Alaska. Due to the creation of Joint Base Pearl Harbor–Hickam, the management and support of Wake Island Airfield and seven other geographically separated locations were moved from the 15th Wing at JBPHH to the 611th ASG at Joint Base Elmendorf-Richardson.

== Units ==
The group consists of two squadrons and two flights and provides surveillance radars, Arctic infrastructure including airfields, communications and USAF airmen for homeland defense, decisive force projection, and aerospace command and control in Alaska. The Pacific Air Forces Regional Support Center is part of the Eleventh Air Force.

- The 611th Air Support Squadron (611 ASUS) manages three of PACAF's largest operations and maintenance (O&M) contracts worth $82M for Eareckson Air Station, the FOL at King Salmon airport, 15 remote radar sites (including the King Salmon Long Range Radar Site nearby King Salmon airport) and three radio relay stations. The squadron provides/directs quality assurance for logistics, force protection, services, communications and facility engineering efforts at these 19 remote locations. The 611 ASUS also supports 11 AF logistics planning and contingency operations, directs delivery of 8 million US gallons (30,000 m^{3}) of fuel annually to all remote sites and ensures safe and reliable transportation of over 5,000 passengers and 2,700 tons of equipment and supplies annually.
- The 611th Air Communications Squadron (611 ACOMS) serves as the focal point for all command, control, communications, and computers (C4) support for ANR and 11 AF. Key functions include theater long-haul communications, radar systems communications, circuit management, network operations and configuration control. Additionally, the unit performs Meteorological Navigational (METNAV) certifications for airfields throughout the theater, as well as Defense Red Switch Network, Communications Security (COMSEC) and frequency spectrum management support. In addition to providing communications planning and programming support to the three O&M contracts, the 611 ACOMS also manages $22 million in communications requirements. The 611 ACOMS also provides direct communications support to the 611 AOC – 24/7 battle staff crisis action operation center.
- The 611th Civil Engineer Squadron (611 CES) provides engineer service functions at all 40 (active and inactive) sites throughout Alaska. The 611 CES assures environmental compliance within 59,000 square miles (150,000 km^{2}) of military operations air space and provides, as a command resource, specialized capability in aircraft hangar door maintenance and repair; asbestos and lead abatement; depot overhaul and certification of emergency power engine-generator sets and aircraft arresting systems; construction of Super K-Span facilities; as well as crane and hoist repair and certification. The 611 CES provides facility support to the three O&M contracts and also manages $61.8M in facility requirements.
- The Missile Defense Flight or Command Representative for Missile Defense serves as the focal point for all issues related to Ground-based Midcourse Defense in Alaska, in support of Alaska Command, Alaska NORAD Region, and 11 AF.
- The 11 AF/Alaska NORAD Region (ANR) Logistics Flight provides a core group of logisticians to support Air Force and NORAD air operations throughout the theater, including manning the ANR Battlestaff and establishing logistics readiness centers when necessary.

== Alaska Radar System ==
see also: Joint Surveillance System

=== Radar sites ===
- Barter Island Long Range Radar Site
- Cape Lisburne Long Range Radar Site
- Cape Newenham Long Range Radar Site
- Cape Romanzof Long Range Radar Site
- Cold Bay Long Range Radar Site
- Fort Yukon Long Range Radar Site
- Indian Mountain Long Range Radar Site
- King Salmon Long Range Radar Site
- Kotzebue Long Range Radar Site
- Murphy Dome Long Range Radar Site
- Oliktok Long Range Radar Site
- Point Barrow Long Range Radar Site
- Point Lay Long Range Radar Site
- Sparrevohn Long Range Radar Site
- Tatalina Long Range Radar Site
- Tin City Long Range Radar Site
- Bullen Point Short Range Radar Site
- Point Lonely Short Range Radar Site
- Wainwright Short Range Radar Site

=== Military support airports ===
- Barter Island LRRS Airport (ICAO: PABA, TC LID: BTI)
- Cape Lisburne LRRS Airport (IATA: LUR, ICAO: PALU, FAA LID: LUR)
- Cape Newenham LRRS Airport (ICAO: PAEH, TC LID: EHM)
- Cape Romanzof LRRS Airport (ICAO: PACZ, TC LID: CCF)
- Indian Mountain LRRS Airport (ICAO: PAIM, TC LID: UTO)
- Point Lay LRRS Airport (IATA: PIZ, ICAO: PPIZ, FAA LID: PIZ)
- Sparrevohn LRRS Airport (ICAO: PASB, TC LID: SVW)
- Tatalina LRRS Airport (ICAO: PATL, TC LID: TLJ)
- Tin City LRRS Airport (IATA: TNC, ICAO: PATC, FAA LID: TNC)
- Wake Island Airfield (IATA: AWK, ICAO: PWAK)
