= Kotzebue Air Force Station =

Closed US Air Force radar station in Alaska

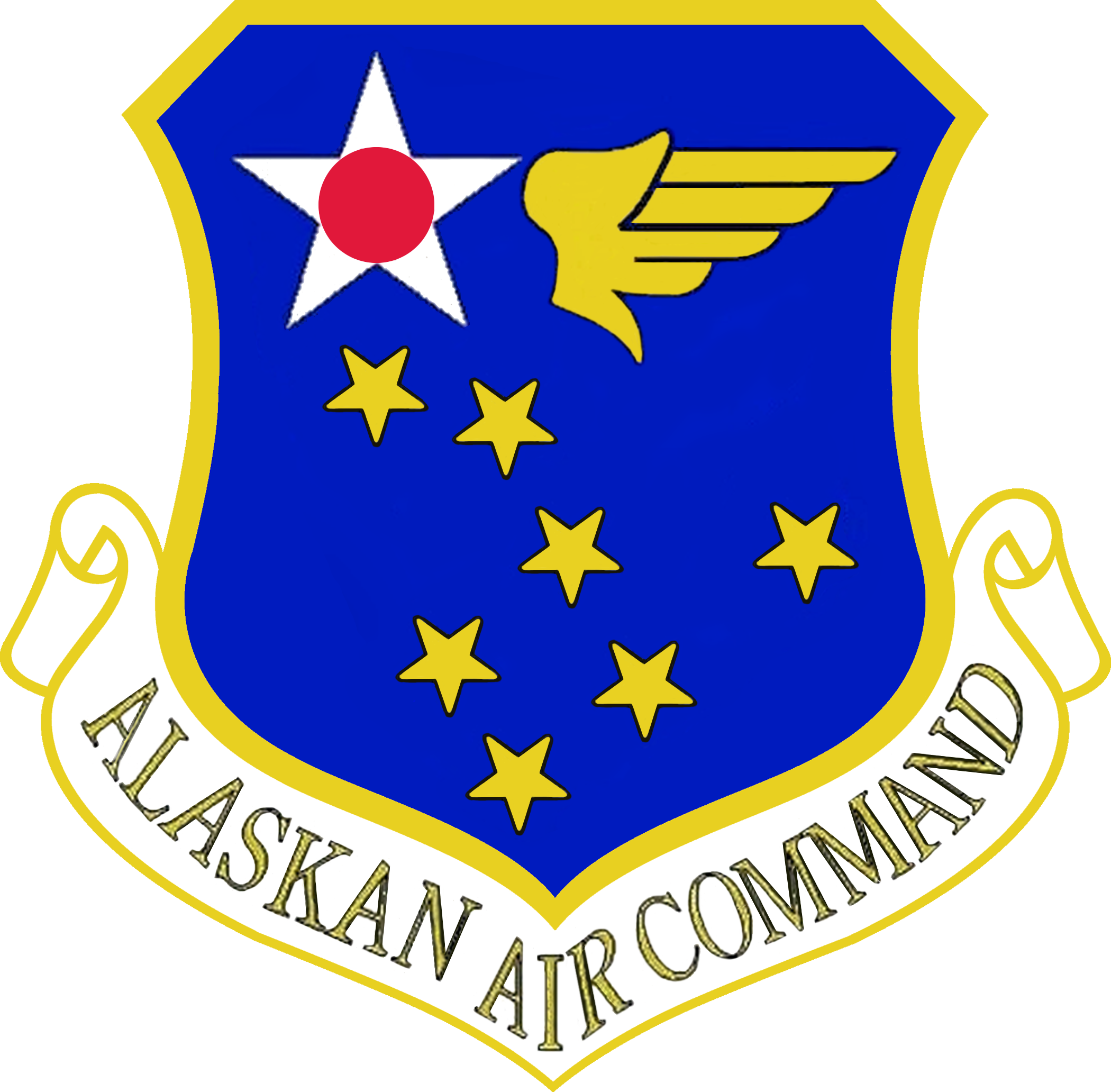
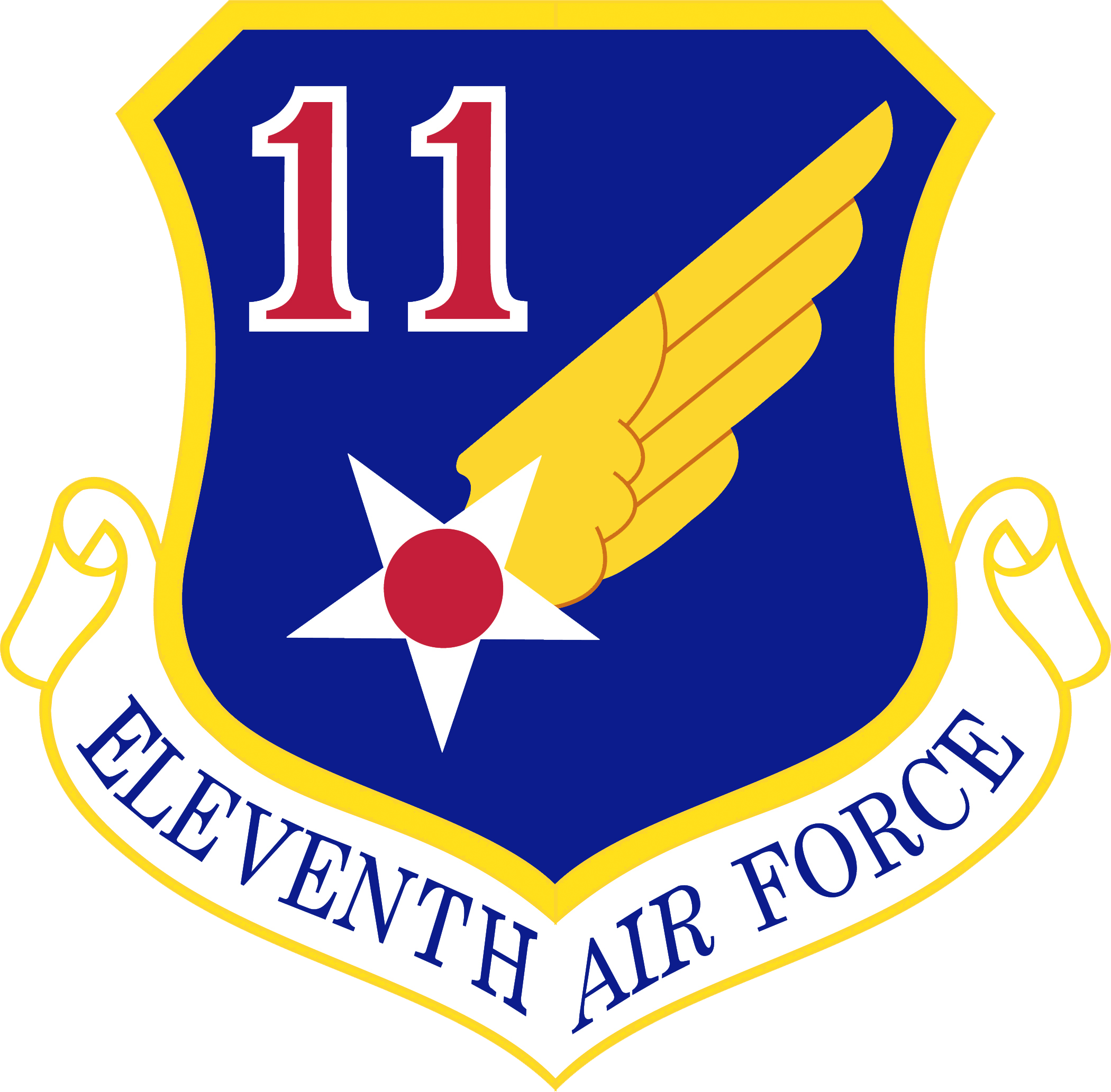
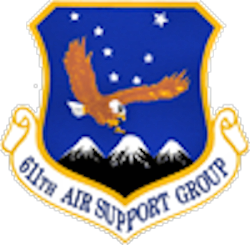
Kotzebue Air Force Station Kotzebue Long Range Radar Site
- Part of Eleventh Air Force (PACAF)
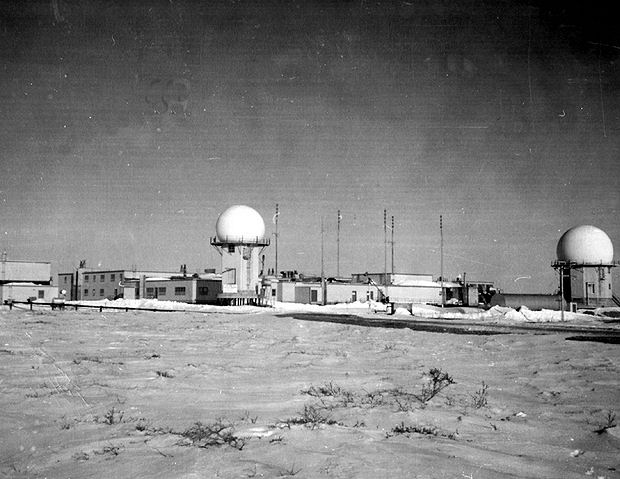
- Kotzebue Air Force Station in the 1960s

Site information
- Type: Air Force Station
- Controlled by: United States Air Force

Location
- Location of Kotzebue AFS, Alaska
- Coordinates: 66°50′35″N 162°35′42″W

Site history
- Built: 1958
- In use: 1958-Present

Garrison information
- Garrison: 748th Aircraft Control and Warning Squadron (1958-1983)

Kotzebue Air Force Station (AAC ID: F-24, LRR ID: A-12) is a closed United States Air Force General Surveillance Radar station. It is located 4 miles (6.4 km) south of Kotzebue, Alaska.

The ground control intercept (GCI) station was closed on 1 November 1983, and was re-designated as a Long Range Radar (LRR) site as part of the Alaska Radar System. Today, it remains active as part of the Alaska NORAD Region under the jurisdiction of the 611th Air Support Group, Elmendorf AFB, Alaska.

== History ==
Kotzebue AFS was a continental defence radar station constructed to provide the United States Air Force early warning of an attack by the Soviet Union via Alaska.

Construction of the station, began in 1957 and was completed in April 1958. The Army Transportation Corps undertook the project. The station site was located on the Kotzebue Sound of Western Alaska, and equipment and construction material was floated by LST or a barge to a dock built on the coast 66°50′18″N 162°35′52″W. Initially, there were no roads, which had to be built as part of the construction effort. Each item had to be hauled up from the port area along the newly constructed road to the permanent station site.

The station consisted of a power/heating plant, water and fuel storage tanks, gymnasium and other support office buildings. Two other buildings contained living quarters, work areas, and recreational facilities plus opportunities for such sports as skiing, skating, horseshoes, and basketball. The station buildings were, except for the civil engineering building connected by heated hallways. As a result, personnel stationed there, with only very few exceptions, were able to wear "summer" uniforms year round, unless they had a need to go outside during the winter season. The coverings of the station's three radar towers were heated from within to keep the covering from becoming brittle from extreme cold, and thus subject to being damaged or destroyed by high winds. Tours at the station were limited to one year because of the psychological strain and physical hardships. A 5-mile road connected the station to Kotzebue, where a civil airport was located and a town, one of Alaska's major tourist attractions.

The 748th Aircraft Control and Warning Squadron, activated in April 1958 operated AN/FPS-8, AN/FPS-4, AN/FPS-6, AN/FPS-20, and AN/FPS-87A Kotzebue AFS operated as a Ground-Control Intercept (GCI) and warning station. As a GCI station, the squadron's role was to guide interceptor aircraft deployed to the forward operating base at Galena AFB toward unidentified intruders picked up on the unit's radar scopes. In March 1953, the Manual Air Defense Direction Center (MCC) at Murphy Dome AFS near Fairbanks exercised control over Kotzebue's radars where the data was analyzed to determine range, direction altitude speed and whether or not aircraft were friendly or hostile.

Communications were initially provided by a high frequency radio system which proved unreliable because of atmospheric disturbances. The Alaskan Air Command, after investigating various options, decided to build the White Alice Communications System, a system of Air Force-owned tropospheric scatter and microwave radio relay sites operated by the Air Force Communications Service (AFCS). The Kotzebue site 66°50′17″N 162°33′24″W was activated in 1958. It was inactivated in 1979, and replaced by an Alascom owned and operated satellite earth terminal as part of an Air Force plan to divest itself of the obsolete White Alice Communications System and transfer the responsibility to a commercial firm.

Over the years, the equipment at the station was upgraded or modified to improve the efficiency and accuracy of the information gathered by the radars. In 1983, Kotzebue received a new AN/FPS-117 minimally attended radar under Alaskan Air Command's SEEK IGLOO program. It was designed to transmit aircraft tracking data via satellite to the Alaskan NORAD Regional Operations Control Center (ROCC) at Elmendorf AFB.

No longer needed, the 748th ACWS was inactivated on l November 1983 and the station re-designated as a Long Range Radar (LRR) Site. In 1990, jurisdiction of the Kotzebue LRR Site was transferred to Eleventh Air Force with the re-designation of AAC.

In 1998 Pacific Air Forces initiated "Operation Clean Sweep", in which abandoned Cold War stations in Alaska were remediated and the land restored to its previous state. After years of neglect the facilities at the station had lost any value they had when the site was closed. The site remediation was carried out by the 611th Civil Engineering Squadron at Elmendorf AFB, and remediation work was completed by 2005.

== Current status ==
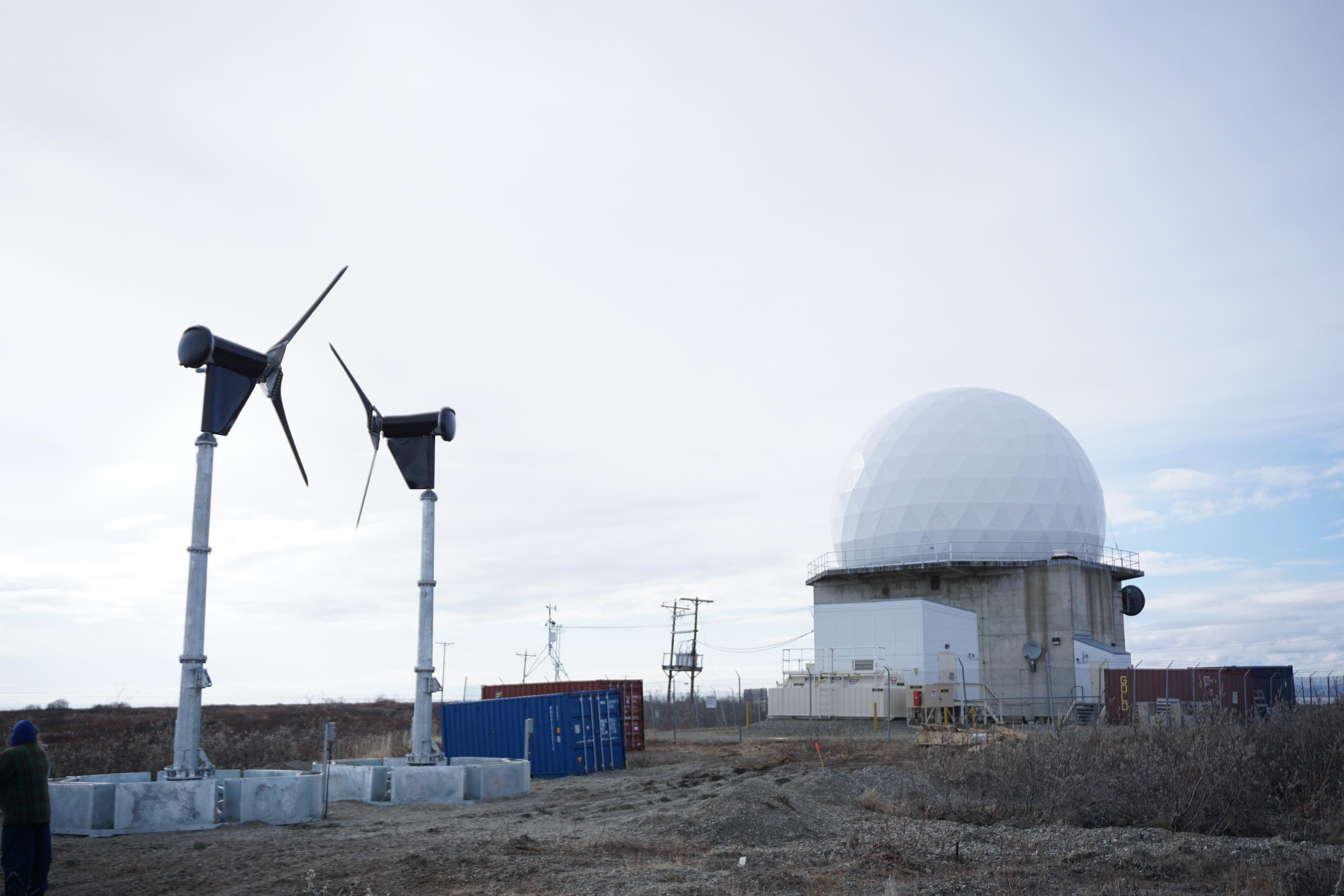
Kotzebue Air Force Station in 2017

Today very little of the former Kotzebue Air Force Station remains. The site is controlled by the Pacific Air Forces 611th Air Support Group, based at Elmendorf AFB. It is generally unattended; a few civilian contractors access the site for maintaining the facilities.

== Air Force units and assignments ==
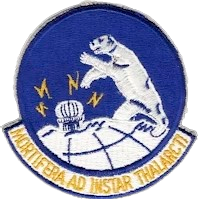
Emblem of the 748th Aircraft Control and Warning Squadron

Units:

- 748th Aircraft Control and Warning Squadron, 1958–1983
- 5059 Air Postal Squadron (Detachment assigned out of Elmendorf A.F.B.)

Assignments:

- 11th Air Division

== See also ==
- Alaskan Air Command
