= Tatalina LRRS Airport =

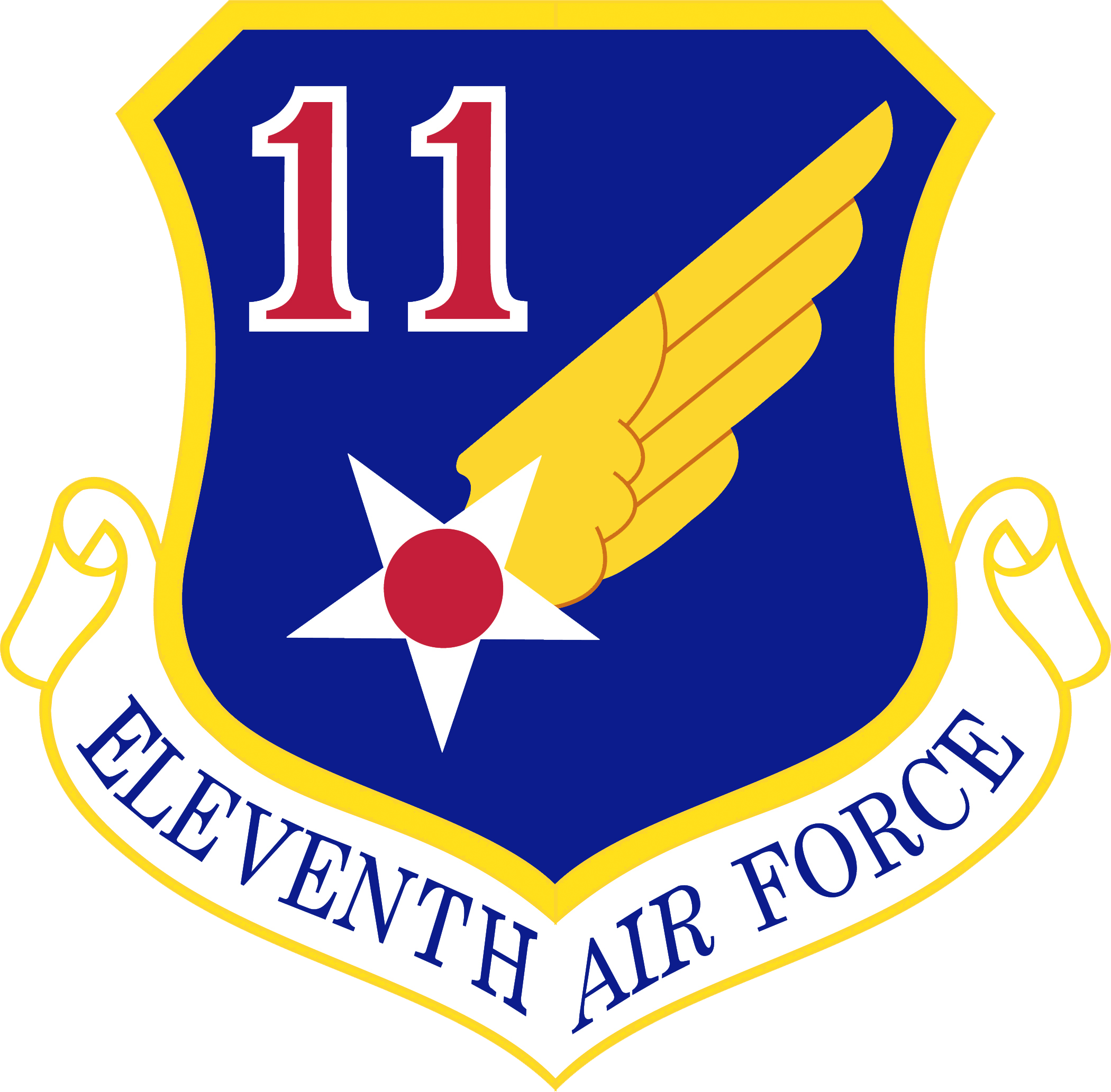
Tatalina LRRS Airport
- IATA: TLJ; ICAO: PATL; FAA LID: TLJ

Summary
- Airport type: Military
- Owner: U.S. Air Force
- Operator: 611th Air Support Group
- Location: Takotna, Alaska
- Elevation AMSL: 964 ft / 294 m
- Coordinates: 62°53′40″N 155°58′35″W

Map
- Location of airport in Alaska

Runways
Direction	Length		Surface
Direction	ft	m	Surface
16/34	3,800	1,158	Gravel

Statistics (1978)
- Aircraft operations: 1,650
- Source: Federal Aviation Administration

Tatalina LRRS Airport (IATA: TLJ, ICAO: PATL, FAA LID: TLJ) is a military airstrip located seven nautical miles (8.1 miles; 13 km) south of Takotna, in the Yukon–Koyukuk Census Area of the U.S. state of Alaska. The airstrip is also located 12.9 miles (20.8 km) west-southwest of McGrath, Alaska. It is not open for public use.

== Overview ==
Tatalina Airport is a United States Air Force military airstrip. Its mission is to provide access to the Tatalina Long Range Radar Site for servicing and other requirements.

The airstrip was constructed as part of the construction of the Tatalina Air Force Station. During the station's operational use as a staffed radar station, it provided transportation for station personnel and for supplies and equipment to be airlifted to the station. With the radar station's closure in 1983, the airstrip now provides access to the unattended site for maintenance personnel and other requirements.

It is not staffed by any support personnel, and is not open to the public. During the winter months, it may be inaccessible due to the extreme weather conditions at the location.

== Facilities and aircraft ==
Tatalina LRRS Airport has one runway designated 16/34 with a gravel surface measuring 3,800 by 150 feet (1,158 by 46 m). For the 12-month period ending July 17, 1978, the airport had 1,650 aircraft operations, an average of 137 per month: 91% air taxi and 9% general aviation.
