= Murphy Dome Air Force Station =

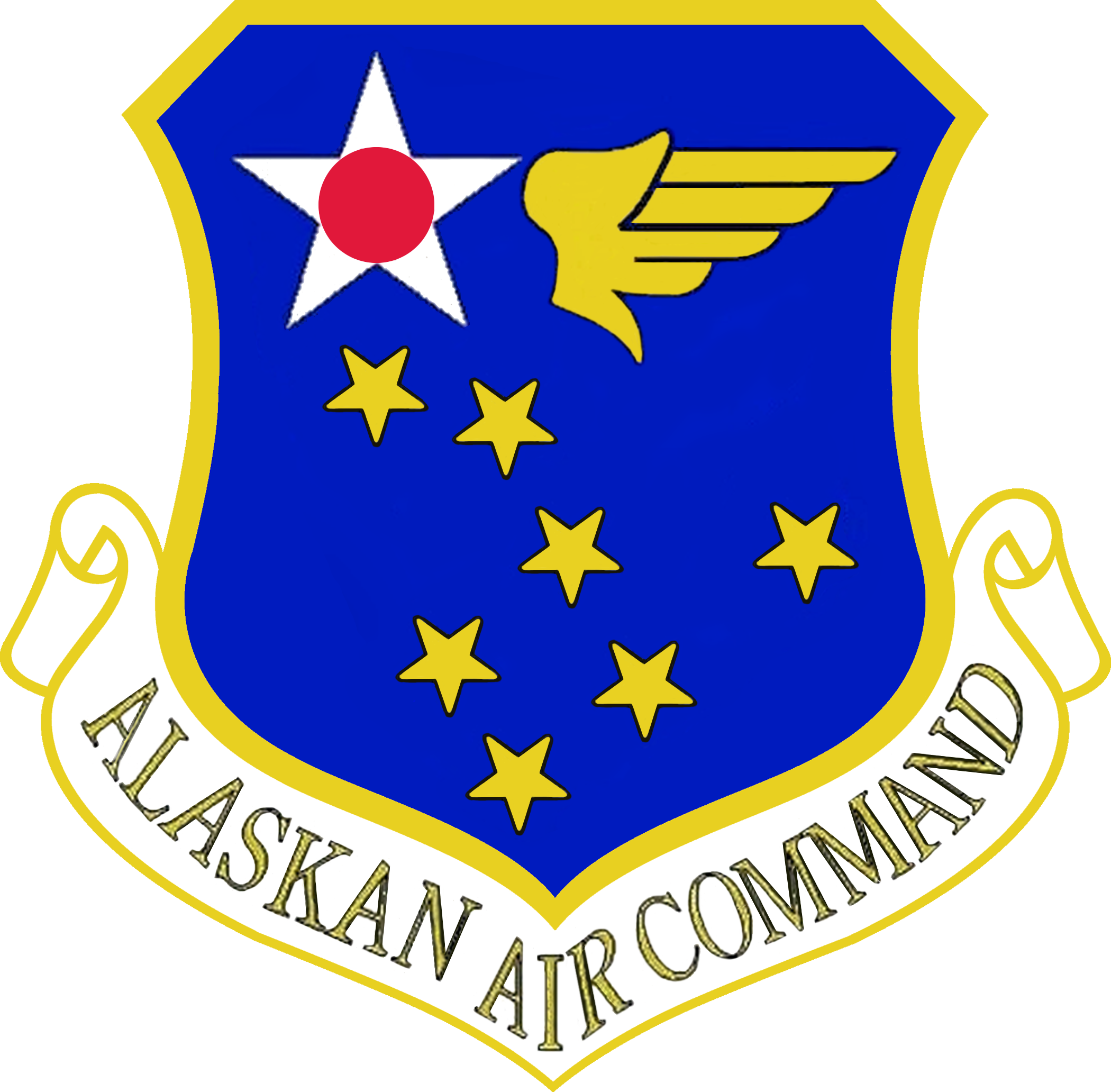
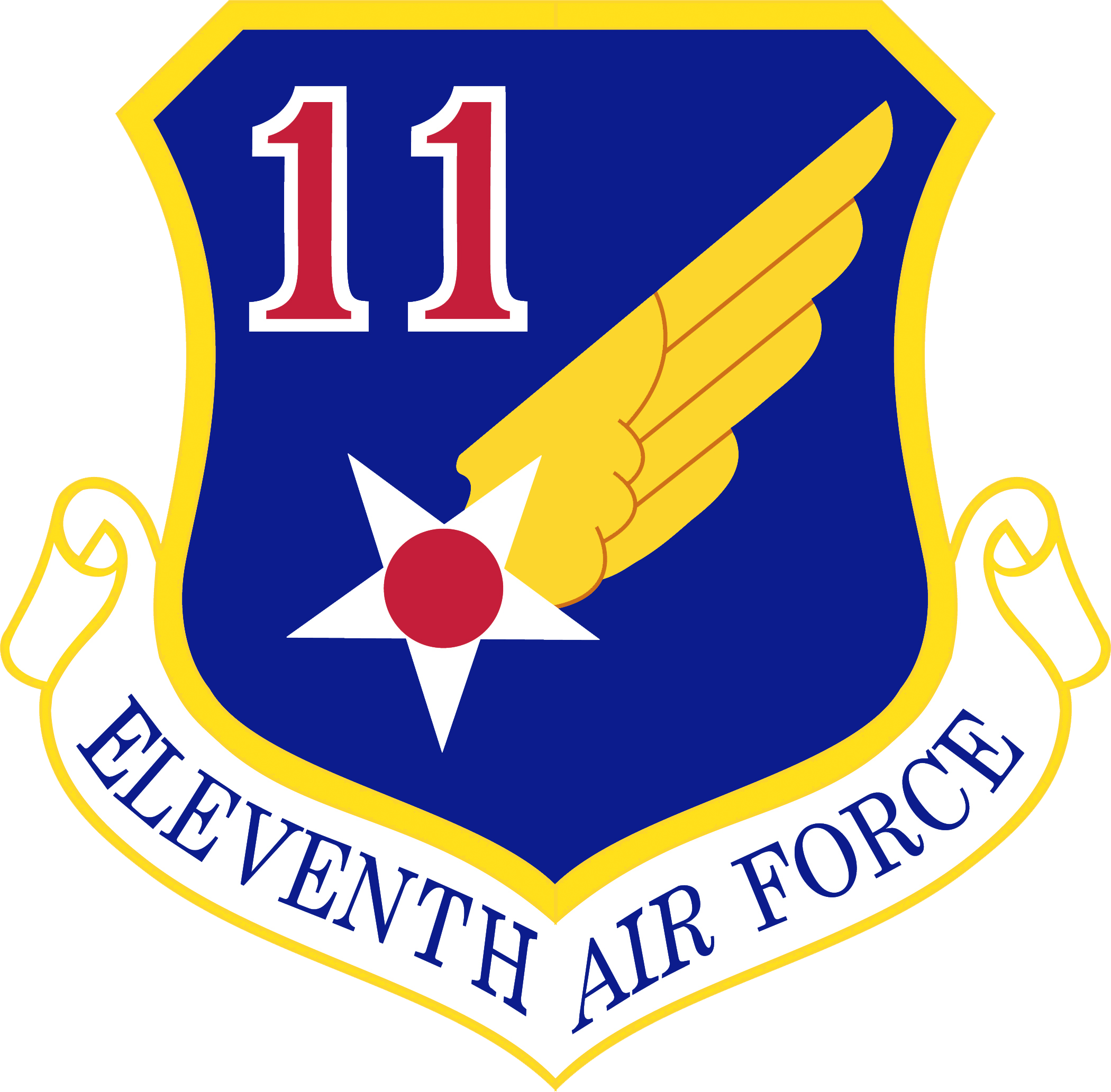
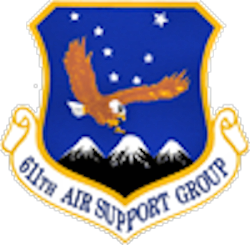
Murphy Dome Air Force Station Murphy Dome Long Range Radar Site
- Part of Eleventh Air Force (PACAF)
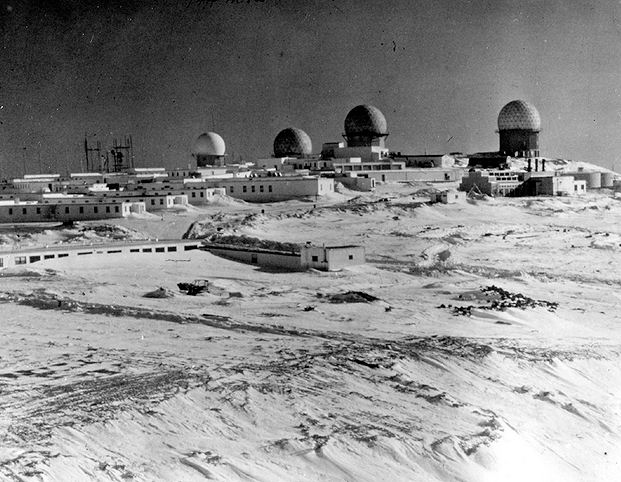
- Murphy Dome Air Force Station

Site information
- Type: Air Force Station
- Controlled by: United States Air Force

Location
- Location of Murphy Dome AFS, Alaska
- Coordinates: 64°57′09″N 148°21′25″W

Site history
- Built: 1951
- In use: 1951-Present

Garrison information
- Garrison: 744th Aircraft Control and Warning Squadron (1953-1983)

Murphy Dome Air Force Station (AAC ID: F-02, LRR ID: A-02) is a closed United States Air Force General Surveillance Radar station 20.4 miles (32.8 km) west-northwest of Fairbanks, Alaska.

The control center station was closed on 1 November 1983, and was re-designated as a Long Range Radar (LRR) site as part of the Alaska Radar System. Today, it remains active as part of the Alaska NORAD Region under the jurisdiction of the Pacific Air Forces Regional Support Center, Joint Base Elmendorf–Richardson, Alaska.

A popular aurora viewing area is located nearby.

== History ==
Murphy Dome AFS was a continental defense radar station constructed to provide the United States Air Force early warning of an attack by the Soviet Union on Alaska. It was one of the ten original aircraft control and warning sites constructed during the early 1950s to establish a permanent air defense system in Alaska.

Murphy Dome was initially operated by a detachment of the 532nd Aircraft Control and Warning Group, Ladd AFB (now Fort Wainwright). The station functioned as a Ground-Control Intercept (GCI) and warning station. As a GCI station, the squadron's role was to guide interceptor aircraft at Ladd AFB toward unidentified intruders picked up on the unit's radar scopes. Radars operated were an AN/CPS-6B, AN/FPS-8, AN/FPS-20, and an AN/FPS-6.

The station site 64°57′12″N 148°21′35″W consisted of a power/heating plant, water and fuel storage tanks, a gymnasium and other support office buildings. Two other buildings contained living quarters, work areas, and recreational facilities plus opportunities for such sports as skiing, skating, pool tables, horseshoes, and basketball. The buildings were connected by enclosed portals so no one needed to go outside in winter unless absolutely necessary. Tours at the station were limited to one year because of the psychological strain and physical hardships. An apartment building, separate from the connected buildings, provided homes for civilian families of civil service employees.

A 4,500' airstrip was constructed on a plateau east of the ground support station, with a gravel runway during 1951 64°56′48″N 148°19′37″W. It appears to have been abandoned when reliable roads were constructed which linked the station into the Alaska highway system. Mail was usually delivered daily after the road connection to Fairbanks was completed. During the 1950s-70s, a ski slope also operated at the site, the trails still visible in aerial photography 64°57′14″N 148°21′27″W. A rope tow was constructed to allow for servicemembers to go up and down the slope.

When the 532nd was inactivated in 1951, the site was then operated by a detachment of the 143rd Aircraft Control and Warning Squadron, Alaska Air National Guard. As part of HQ Alaskan Air Command's (HQ AAC) plan to upgrade all remote sites to full squadrons, the 744th Aircraft Control and Warning Squadron was activated at Murphy Dome on 1 February 1953 with an authorized strength of 249 personnel.

Murphy Dome converted to an air defense Direction Center (later renamed NORAD Control Center) on 4 March 1953, and exercised control over Campion AFS (GCI); Indian Mountain AFS, Tin City AFS and Cape Lisburne AFS (surveillance). Beginning in 1958, the Fort Yukon AFS and Kotzebue AFS Ground Intercept Sites were added when they were activated. As an MCC site, its mission was to feed air defense data to the Alaskan Control Center at Elmendorf AFB where it was analyzed to determine range, direction altitude speed and whether or not aircraft were friendly or hostile. The station also operated a number of radars, including AN/CPS-6B, AN/FPS-8, AN/FPS-20, and AN/FPS-6.

Communications were initially provided by a White Alice TD-2 microwave A Route radio link to Clear AFS operated by the Air Force Communications Service (AFCS) 64°57′16″N 148°21′54″W. It was inactivated in 1979, and replaced by an Alascom owned and operated satellite earth terminal as part of an Air Force plan to divest itself of the obsolete White Alice Communications System and transfer the responsibility to a commercial firm.

With the creation of NORAD in 1957, Murphy Dome AFS became one of four NORAD Control Centers in Alaska. The squadron supported, administered and trained assigned personnel to perform air defense missions, support tactical missions as directed by HQ AAC, and operate and maintain the station. The USAF shared its radars with the United States Army Air-Defense Command Post (AADCP) for Nike missile-defense system (Fairbanks Defense Area). The AN/CPS-6B radar was removed in July 1958, the AN/FPS-8 was active until the Nike sites were inactivated in 1971.

In 1977, the 744 ACWS was assigned to the newly reactivated 531st Aircraft Control and Warning Group (531 ACWG). The 531 ACWG was later redesignated the 11th Tactical Control Group (11 TCG) in 1981.

In the early 1980s, construction began on a new NORAD Region Operations Control Center (ROCC) at Elmendorf AFB, which would be responsible for managing all air defense operations in Alaska, making all staffed remote radar sites redundant. The 744th ACWS was selected to man the ROCC, which achieved full operational status on 15 September 1983.

In 1983, Murphy Dome received a new AN/FPS-117 minimally attended radar under Alaskan Air Command's SEEK IGLOO program. It was designed to transmit aircraft tracking data via satellite to the Alaskan NORAD Regional Operations Control Center (ROCC) at Elmendorf AFB. No longer needed, the 744th ACWS was inactivated on l November 1983 and the station re-designated as a Long Range Radar (LRR) Site. This left only contractor personnel to maintain the site radar. In 1990, jurisdiction of the Murphy Dome LRR Site was transferred to Eleventh Air Force with the re-designation of AAC.

In 1998 Pacific Air Forces initiated "Operation Clean Sweep", in which abandoned Cold War stations in Alaska were remediated and the land restored to its previous state. After years of neglect the facilities at the station had lost any value they had when the site was closed. The site remediation of the radar, support and White Alice communication station was carried out by the 611th Civil Engineering Squadron at Joint Base Elmendorf–Richardson, and remediation work was completed by 2005.

== Demographics ==
Historical population
| Census | Pop. | Note | %± |
|---|---|---|---|
| 1980 | 72 | | — |
U.S. Decennial Census

Murphy Dome appeared once on the U.S. Census in 1980 as a census-designated place (CDP) before its closure in 1983.

== Current status ==
Today very little of the former Murphy Dome Air Force Station remains. The site is controlled by the Pacific Air Forces Regional Support Center, based at Joint Base Elmendorf–Richardson. It is generally unattended; a few civilian contractors access the site for maintaining the facilities.

== Air Force units and assignments ==
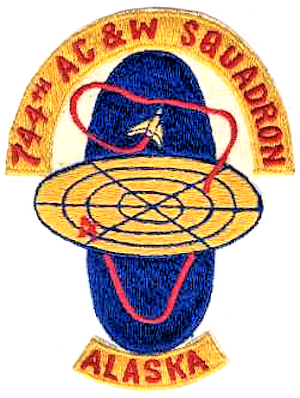
1950s emblem of the 744th Aircraft Control and Warning Squadron

Units:

- 744th Aircraft Control and Warning Squadron, 1 February 1953 – 1 November 1983

Assignments:

- 532d Aircraft Control and Warning Group, 1 February 1953
- 531st Aircraft Control and Warning Group, 1 October 1977
- 11th Tactical Control Group, 1 July 1981 – 1 November 1983

== See also ==
- Alaskan Air Command
