= 176th Air Defense Squadron =

- Active: 2004–present
- Country: United States
- Allegiance: Alaska
- Branch: Air National Guard
- Type: Squadron
- Role: Air defense
- Part of: Alaska Air National Guard
- Garrison/HQ: Joint Base Elmendorf-Richardson, Anchorage, Alaska
- Nickname: Top Rock
- Motto: Eyes of the North

Commanders
- Current commander: Lt Col James W. Fowley

Insignia
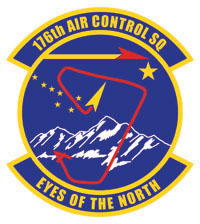
- 176th Air Defense Squadron emblem

The 176th Air Defense Squadron is a unit of the Alaska Air National Guard 176th Wing located at Joint Base Elmendorf-Richardson, Alaska.

== Overview ==
The squadron provides personnel to operate and maintain the Alaskan Region Air Operations Center (RAOC) of the North American Aerospace Defense Command (NORAD). It integrates fixed and airborne radar into the NORAD Global Command and Control System (NGCCS), and conducts 24-hour Alaskan NORAD Region (ANR) and Eleventh Air Force air sovereignty and theater air control operations.

The 176th Air Defense Squadron is unique among the other American sectors in that it controls the only sector within its region, while the Eastern Air Defense Sector and Western Air Defense Sector both comprise the Continental NORAD Region. In addition to this distinction, it is the only sector that has regular reported intercepts of foreign military aircraft, with multiple intercepts of Russian Tu-95 "Bear" aircraft through its lifetime.

== History ==
The 176th Air Defense Squadron traces its lineage, honors and history to Murphy Dome Air Force Station, (originally situated in a mountainous region known as the Yukon-Tanana Upland, 20 miles northwest of Fairbanks, Alaska). It was one of the ten original aircraft control and warning sites constructed during the early 1950s to establish a permanent air defense system in Alaska.

Murphy Dome was initially operated by a detachment of the 532d Aircraft Control and Warning Group, Ladd Air Force Base (now Fort Wainwright). When the 532d was inactivated in 1951, the site was then operated by a detachment of the 13rd

Aircraft Control and Warning Squadron, Alaska Air National Guard. As part of HQ Alaskan Air Command's plan to upgrade all remote sites to full squadrons, the 744th Aircraft Control and Warning Squadron (744th ACWS) was activated at Murphy Dome on 1 February 1953 with an authorized strength of 249 personnel.

The mission of the 744th ACWS was to support, administer and train assigned personnel to perform air defense missions, support tactical missions as directed by HQ AAC, and operate and maintain the Murphy Dome AFS.

In 1977, the 744th ACWS was assigned to the newly reactivated 531st Aircraft Control and Warning Group (531st ACWG). The 531 ACWG was later re-designated the 11th Tactical Control Group (11th TCG) in 1981.

In the early 1980s, construction began on a new NORAD Region Operations Control Center (ROCC) at Elmendorf AFB, which would be responsible for managing all air defense operations in Alaska, making all staffed remote radar sites redundant. The 744th ACWS was selected to staff the ROCC, which achieved full operational status on 15 September 1983. All remote radar squadrons were inactivated by 1 November 1983. Under HQ Alaskan Air Command's SEEK IGLOO program, civilian manning at all remote radar sites was reduced to approximately four civilian personnel per site. n 1989, the 744th ACWS was aligned under the newly established 11th Tactical Control Wing (11 TCW). In 1992, this wing was renamed the 11th Air Control Wing (11 ACW), and the 744 ACWS was renamed the 744th Air Defense Squadron (744th ADS). The 11th ACW was reorganized on 1 July 1994 as the 611th Air Operations Group (611th AOG), and the 744th ADS was renamed the 611th Air Control Squadron (611th ACS).

In 2001, the 611th ACS began a four-year transition to the Alaska Air National Guard. On 1 October 2004, the 611th ACS was officially inactivated and the 176th ACS was ceremonially recognized. Thus, the 176th ACS traces its heritage and honors from the original 744 ACWS/ADS, handed down over the past 50 years. In September 2013, the 176th ACS was re-designated as the 176th Air Defense Squadron (176th ADS).

=== Lineage ===
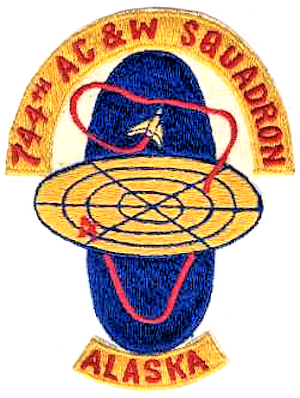
Emblem of the 744th Aircraft Control and Warning Squadron.

- Activated as 744th Aircraft Control and Warning Squadron, 1 February 1953

Redesignated 744th Air Defense Squadron, 1 October 1992
Redesignated 611th Air Control Squadron, 1 July 1994
Inactivated on 1 October 2004

- Established as: 176th Air Control Squadron and allocated to Alaska ANG in 2004

Received federal recognition on 1 October 2004, assuming personnel and equipment of 611th Air Control Squadron (Inactivated)
Reestablished as:176th Air Defense Squadron in August 2013.

Note: No direct lineage or history between 611th ACS and 176th ACS

=== Assignments ===
- 532d Aircraft Control and Warning Group, 1 February 1953
- 531st Aircraft Control and Warning Group, 1 October 1977
- 11th Tactical Control Group, 1 July 1981
- 11th Tactical Control Wing, 1 October 1989
- 11th Air Control Wing, 1 October 1992
- 611th Air Operations Group, 1 July 1994
- 176th Operations Group, 1 October 2004 – present

=== Stations ===
- Murphy Dome Air Force Station, Alaska, 1 February 1953
- Elmendorf Air Force Base, Alaska, 1 November 1983 – 1 October 2004; 1 October 2004
- Joint Base Elmendorf-Richardson, Alaska, 18 February 2011 – present

=== Honors ===
The squadron has earned four Air Force Outstanding Unit Awards for the following periods: 13 August 1967 – 21 August 1967, 1 January 1976 – 31 December 1976, 1 January 1978 – 31 December 1978, 1 July 1982 – 8 November 1983, 1 July 1994 – 30 June 1996, and 1 October 1999 – 30 September 2001

== See also ==
- Southeast Air Defense Sector
- Western Air Defense Sector
- Eastern Air Defense Sector
- Eleventh Air Force
- North American Aerospace Defense Command
