= White Alice Communications System =

US Air Force telecommunications network

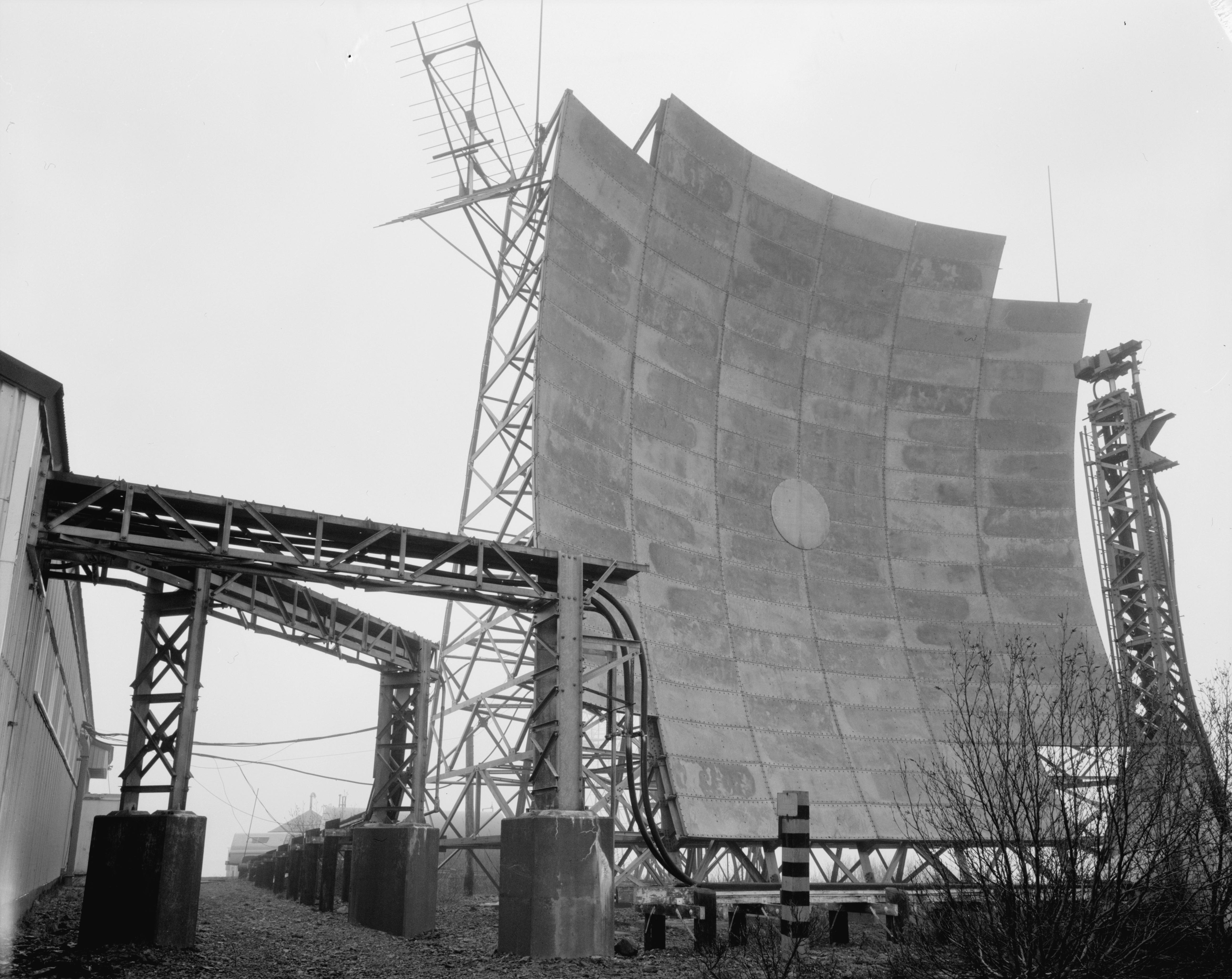
Boswell Bay, Alaska White Alice site, tropospheric scatter antenna and feedhorn

The White Alice Communications System (WACS, "White Alice" colloquially) was a United States Air Force telecommunication network with 80 radio stations constructed in Alaska during the Cold War. It used tropospheric scatter for over-the-horizon links and microwave relay for shorter line-of-sight links. Sites were characterized by large parabolic, tropospheric scatter antennas as well as smaller microwave dishes for point-to-point links.

The system connected remote Air Force sites in Alaska, such as Aircraft Control and Warning (AC&W), Distant Early Warning Line (DEW Line) and Ballistic Missile Early Warning System (BMEWS), to command and control facilities and in some cases it was used for civilian phone calls. The network was originally operated by the USAF, but was turned over to RCA for operations after 1969. The opening of satellite communication links in the 1970s made the system obsolete, and in 1979 it was replaced by an RCA satellite link that connected all of the stations to Anchorage.

The network was sold the same year to a civilian operator for telephone calls. The deteriorating condition of the sites led to its shutdown in the 1980s and most of the facilities have since been removed.

== Background ==
=== Troposcatter ===
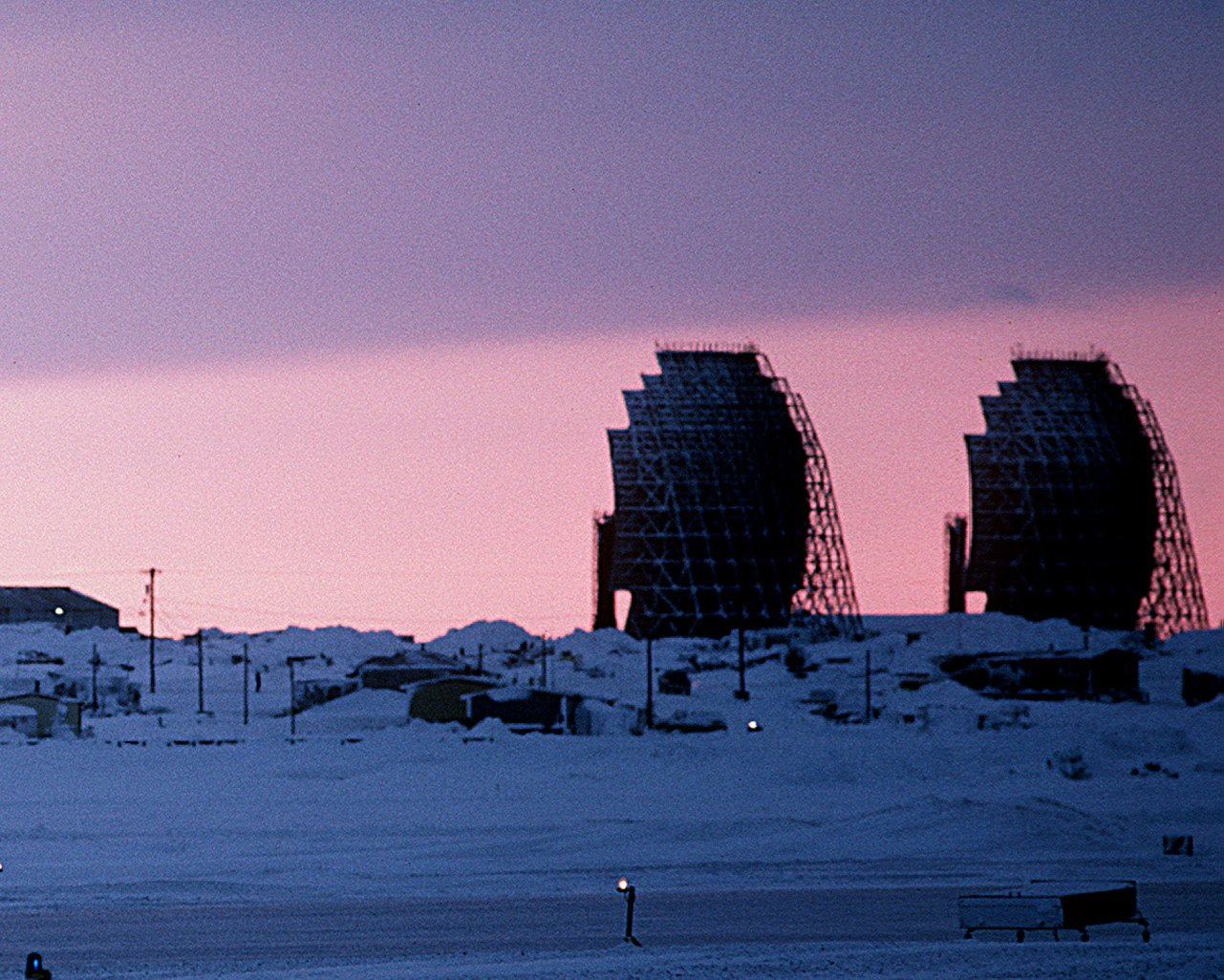
Barter Island, Alaska White Alice tropospheric antennas

White Alice was conceived in the 1950s when Alaska had only basic telephone communication systems. For example, prior to White Alice only one phone call at a time could be placed from Nome to Fairbanks. Communication improved after White Alice was installed, but even in the mid-1960s, Anchorage residents had to go to one location downtown to place a call to the lower 48.

The Air Force built the White Alice Communications System with numerous support facilities around the state to provide reliable communications to far-flung, isolated, and often rugged locales. Construction began in 1955 and the system was dedicated in 1958. In the end, 71 systems were installed throughout Alaska. White Alice was designed by Western Electric, and civilian contractors maintained it. In 1976, the WACS was leased to RCA Alascom. By the end of the 1970s, most of the system was deactivated.

In the 1950s, the Air Force used two-word code names, and White Alice was the code name selected for the project. It is fairly certain that White was used to indicate the snowy Arctic sites that the system would serve. It is unclear where the term Alice originated. Some sources suggest that Alice is an acronym for Alaska Integrated Communications Enterprise. Other sources suggest that the system would have been named Alice White had there not been an actress with that name at the time. Thus it was reversed to White Alice. It is also possible that the code name White Alice was selected for no particular reason.

== Construction ==
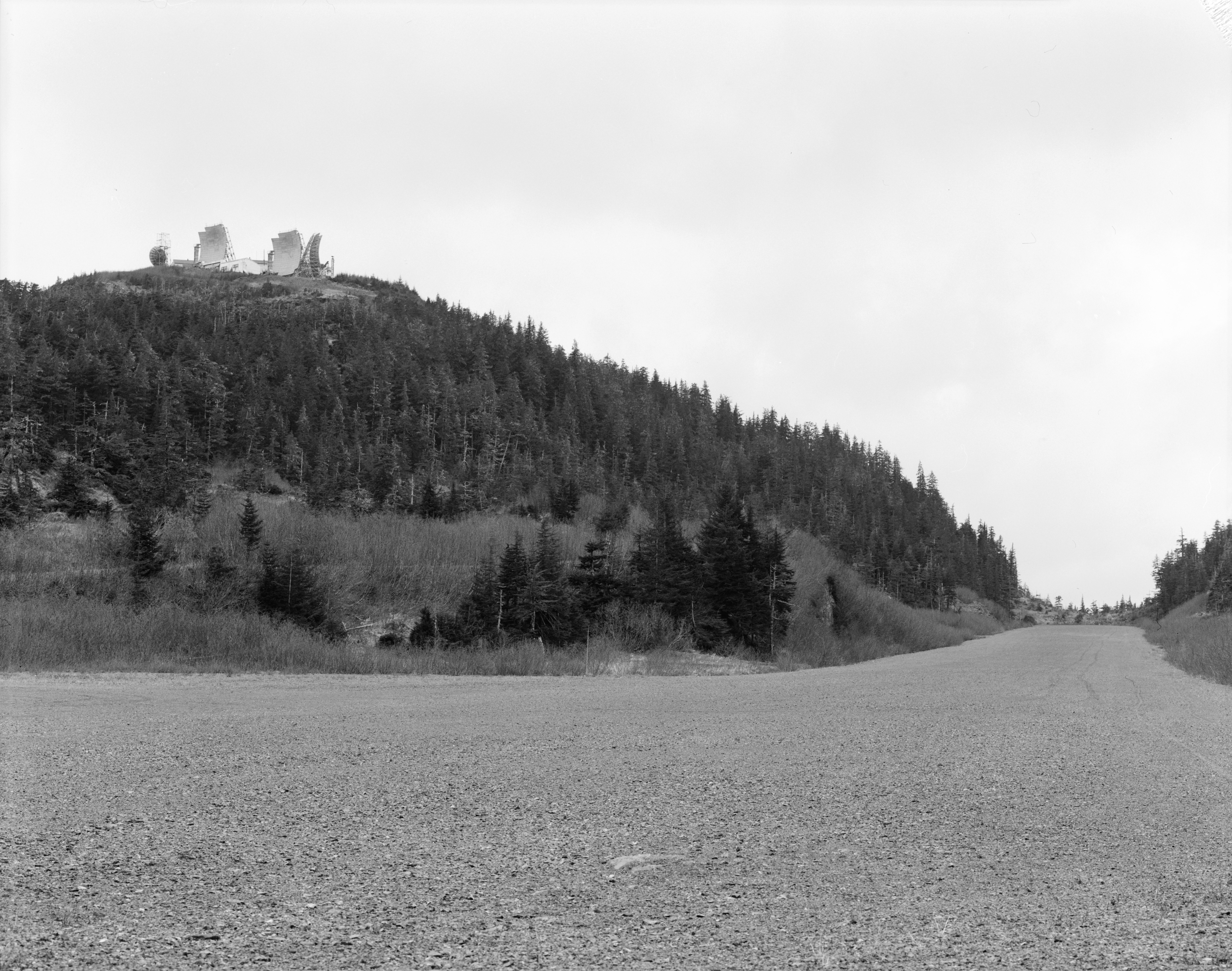
Overview of Boswell Bay, Alaska WACS showing how remote the sites were. Some locations required tram systems to ascend the mountain on which they were located.

The United States Army Corps of Engineers (USACE), Alaska district surveyed and selected each one of the original sites. It also constructed 11 of the original 31 sites. The selection process required that survey teams test the propagation path by setting up communication towers at each remote site during winter months. Some of the sites were easily accessible, but most of the sites were far from civilization on remote mountain peaks. 14 tons of equipment were taken by dogsled or helicopter to survey the sites.

Construction was extremely expensive, with initial estimates around $30 million, but the first phase cost over $110 million. Project Stretchout drove costs over $300 million. Part of this expense was due to Western Electric's underestimate of maintenance requirements. They initially estimated that a single site would require six people and one 25 kW generator. However, each site required 20 people and 120 to 180 kW of electrical power to operate. In remote areas, an airfield was constructed to deliver supplies to the sites. Since electricity was not available at the sites, diesel generators and fuel tanks had to be placed, and quarters for the technicians were also required. Mountain top sites had an upper camp with the electronic equipment and a lower camp with support facilities. These were sometimes connected by a tram system. In addition to the support equipment, a typical White Alice repeater site consisted of four tropospheric dishes, grouped in pairs of two facing opposite directions to receive and transmit information from adjacent sites.

== Operation ==
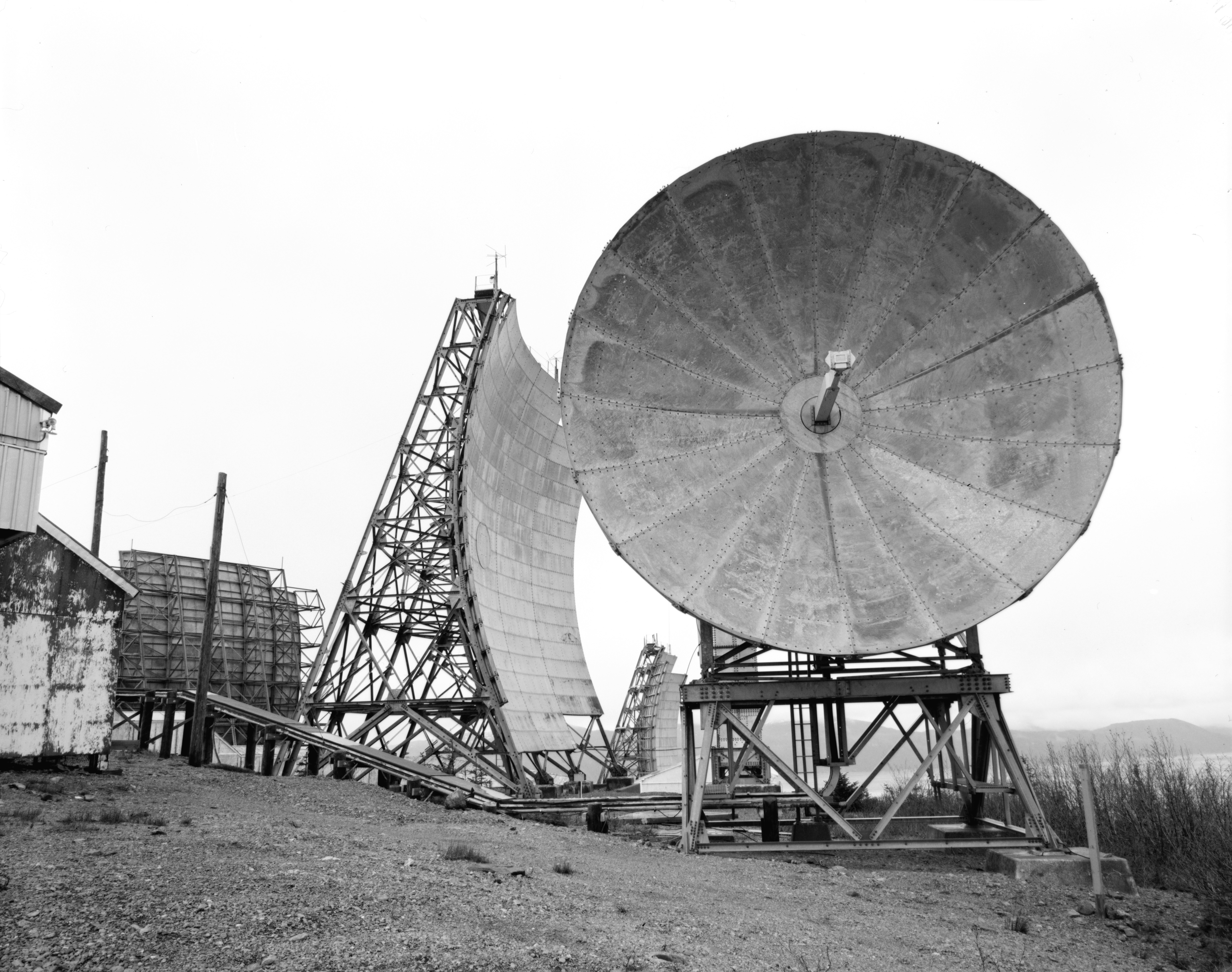
Boswell Bay, Alaska White Alice Site, 30 ft (9 m) antenna for Middleton Island hop foreground, 60 ft (18 m) antenna background

The tropospheric scatter system operated around 4 GHz to 5.5 GHz, and utilized both space diversity and frequency diversity, multiplexing a maximum of 132 simultaneous voice channels. The tropospheric hops used pairs of 60 ft (18 m) or 120 ft (37 m) parabolic, billboard like reflectors pointed at a low angle into the horizon. The radio waves were scattered by the tropopause, returning to Earth beyond the horizon, allowing communication between stations hundreds of miles apart. Having two antennas allowed for space diversity, meaning that if tropospheric conditions degrade on one path the second path might still be clear and communications would not be disrupted. For frequency diversity, each antenna transmitted two separate frequencies. Using both frequency and space diversity was called quad diversity. System power output for most shots was 10 kW and used 60 ft (18 m) antennas. Longer shots used 120 ft (37 m) antennas with 50 kW and shorter shots used 1 kW and 30 ft (9 m), round parabolic dishes.

== Decommissioning and aftermath ==
After 1970, WACS was transferred from Air Force control to RCA Alascom and served civilian use until the late 1970s, when it was superseded by satellite communication earth stations. The last tropospheric link, from Boswell Bay to Neklasson Lake, was used until January 1985 to connect Middleton Island to the network. Vandalism, unsafe conditions and environmental concerns caused the Department of Defense (DOD) to remove physical structures at the sites between the late 1980s to the early 2000s. Several former White Alice sites and collocated facilities became contaminated sites managed by Alaska's Department of Environmental Conservation Contaminated Sites Program and DOD Cleanup programs sites because of PCB usage and fuel leakage from storage tanks. It is likely the cost to clean up some of the sites will far exceed the cost of construction.

== See also ==
- List of White Alice Communications System sites, a list of sites in the White Alice system
- Pole Vault, the first operational tropospheric scatter communications system
- Distant Early Warning Line
- Ballistic Missile Early Warning System
- Western Electric – Designer / maintainer of White Alice
- North Atlantic Radio System (NARS), a similar system used in the GIUK gap area
- ACE High, a NATO communication system in Europe including similar tropospheric systems
- Elmendorf Air Force Base, command site for the Air Force in Alaska
- AT&T Alascom
- Alaskan Air Command, original reason for White Alice
- Radio propagation
- Tropospheric scatter
- Submarine communications cable
