= ALSIB =

Soviet portion of World War II air route

2LT Nikolai de Tolly (USAAF) and Polkovnik Mikhail Machin (Soviet Air Forces) in Fairbanks, Alaska, 1942.

ALSIB (Note: Short for Alaska-Siberia; also called the Northern Trace. Known to the Russians as: Алсиб; Аляска — Сибирь (Alyaska–Sibir); воздушная трасса Красноярск — Уэлькаль, vozdushnaya trassa Krasnoyarsk — Uelkal, 'Krasnoyarsk–Uelkal air route'; Красноярская воздушная трасса, Krasnoyarskaya vozdushnaya trassa, 'Krasnoyarsk air route) was the Soviet portion of the air route from the Territory of Alaska to Siberia, moving Lend-Lease aircraft from the Northwest Staging Route. Aircraft manufactured in the United States were flown over this route for World War II combat service on the Eastern Front.

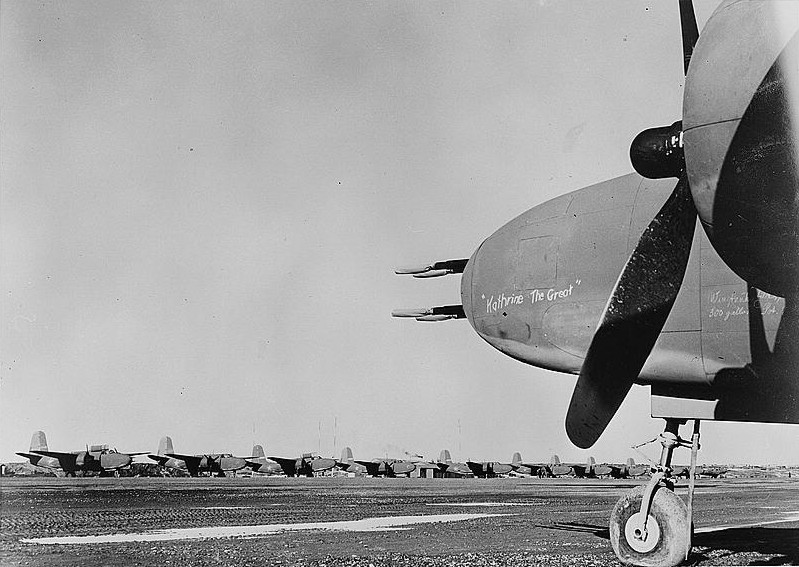
Kathrine the Great and other Douglas A-20 Havocs waiting at Nome to fly west over the ALSIB.

== Routing ==
United States ferry pilots delivered aircraft to Ladd Army Airfield in Fairbanks, Alaska. There each aircraft was serviced by USAAF personnel in preparation for Soviet inspection. After Soviet inspectors accepted the aircraft, five regiments of ferry pilots conveyed aircraft from Fairbanks to Soviet pilot training facilities near Krasnoyarsk. Each regiment was assigned to a specific segment of the route to become familiar with navigation and weather within that segment. Single-seat Bell P-39 Airacobra and Bell P-63 Kingcobra fighters flew in groups with a pair of multi-engine North American B-25 Mitchell or Douglas A-20 Havoc bombers. The lead bomber navigated for the flight and the trailing bomber watched for stragglers. Bombers and Douglas C-47 Skytrains might fly independently, and C-47s transported ferry pilots east for new aircraft.

=== 1st regiment ===
Soviet First regiment pilots accepted the planes at Fairbanks and flew over the Bering Strait via St. Lawrence Island.

- Ladd Army Airfield 64°50′15″N 147°36′51″W
- Galena Airport 64°44′10″N 156°56′04″W
- Marks Army Airfield 64°30′44″N 165°26′43″W
- Gambell Army Airfield 63°46′04″N 171°43′59″W
- Uelkal 65°32′00″N 179°17′00″W

=== 2nd regiment ===
Second regiment pilots flew from Uelkal to Seymchan.

- Uelkal
- Anadyr 64°44′00″N 177°31′00″E
- Markovo 64°40′00″N 170°25′00″E
- Seymchan Airport 62°55′00″N 152°25′12″E

=== 3rd regiment ===
Third regiment pilots flew from Seymchan to Yakutsk.

- Seymchan
- Zyryanka West Airport 65°44′12″N 150°42′18″E
- Susuman Airport 62°46′00″N 148°08′48″E
- Oymyakon 63°27′39″N 142°47′09″E
- Khandyga 62.67°N 135.60°E
- Ust-Maya 60.42°N 134.3°E
- Yakutsk Airport 62°05′36″N 129°46′18″E

=== 4th regiment ===
Fourth regiment pilots flew from Yakutsk to Kirensk.

- Yakutsk
- Aldan 58°40′00″N 125°21′00″E
- Olyokminsk 60°22′00″N 120°26′00″E
- Bodaybo Airport 57°51′59″N 114°14′33″E
- Vitim Airport 59°27′28″N 112°33′46″E
- Kirensk Airport 57°46′12″N 108°03′36″E

=== 5th regiment ===
Fifth regiment pilots flew from Kirensk to Krasnoyarsk.

- Kirensk
- Ust-Kut Airport 56°51′24″N 105°43′48″E
- Krasnoyarsk Northeast 56°02′30″N 92°54′24″E

== See also ==
- North Atlantic air ferry route in World War II
- South Pacific air ferry route in World War II
- West Coast Wing (Air Transport Command route to Alaska)
- Crimson Route (Planned route from North America to Europe, later abandoned)

== Notes ==
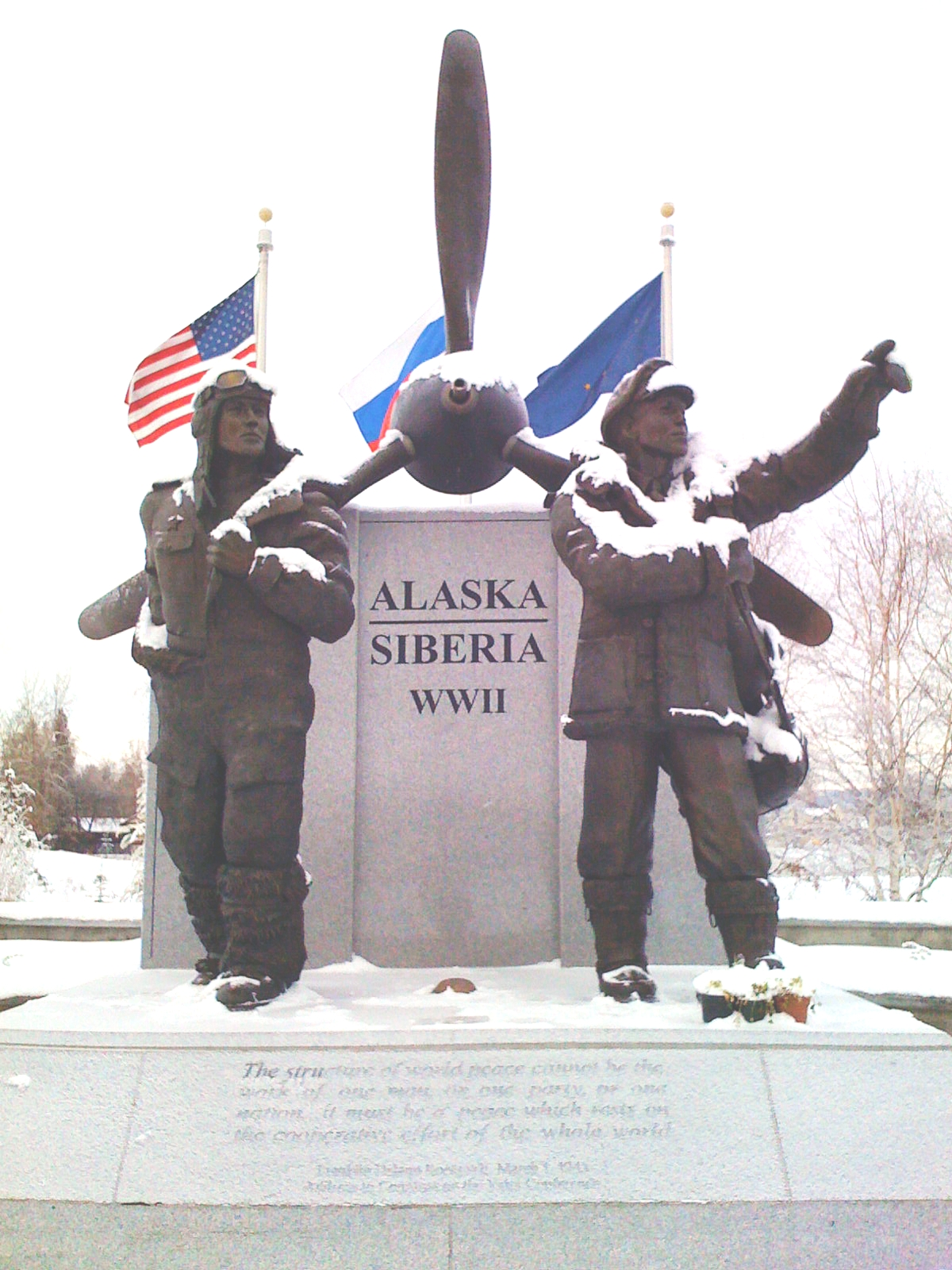
ALSIB memorial in Fairbanks, Alaska.

== Sources ==
- Altunin, Evgenii (1997). "ALSIB: On The History of the Alaska–Siberia Ferrying Route". The Journal of Slavic Military Studies. 10 (2): 85–96. doi:10.1080/13518049708430292.
- Lebedev, Igor (1997). Aviation Lend-Lease to Russia. Commack, New York: Nova Publishers. ISBN 1-56072-417-X.
- Alexander B. Dolitsky, ed. (2016). Pipeline to Russia :the Alaska-Siberia Air Route in World War II. National Park Service. ISBN 978-0-9907252-1-3.
