= Air Transport Command =

United States Army Air Forces command responsible for transport and ferrying aircraft

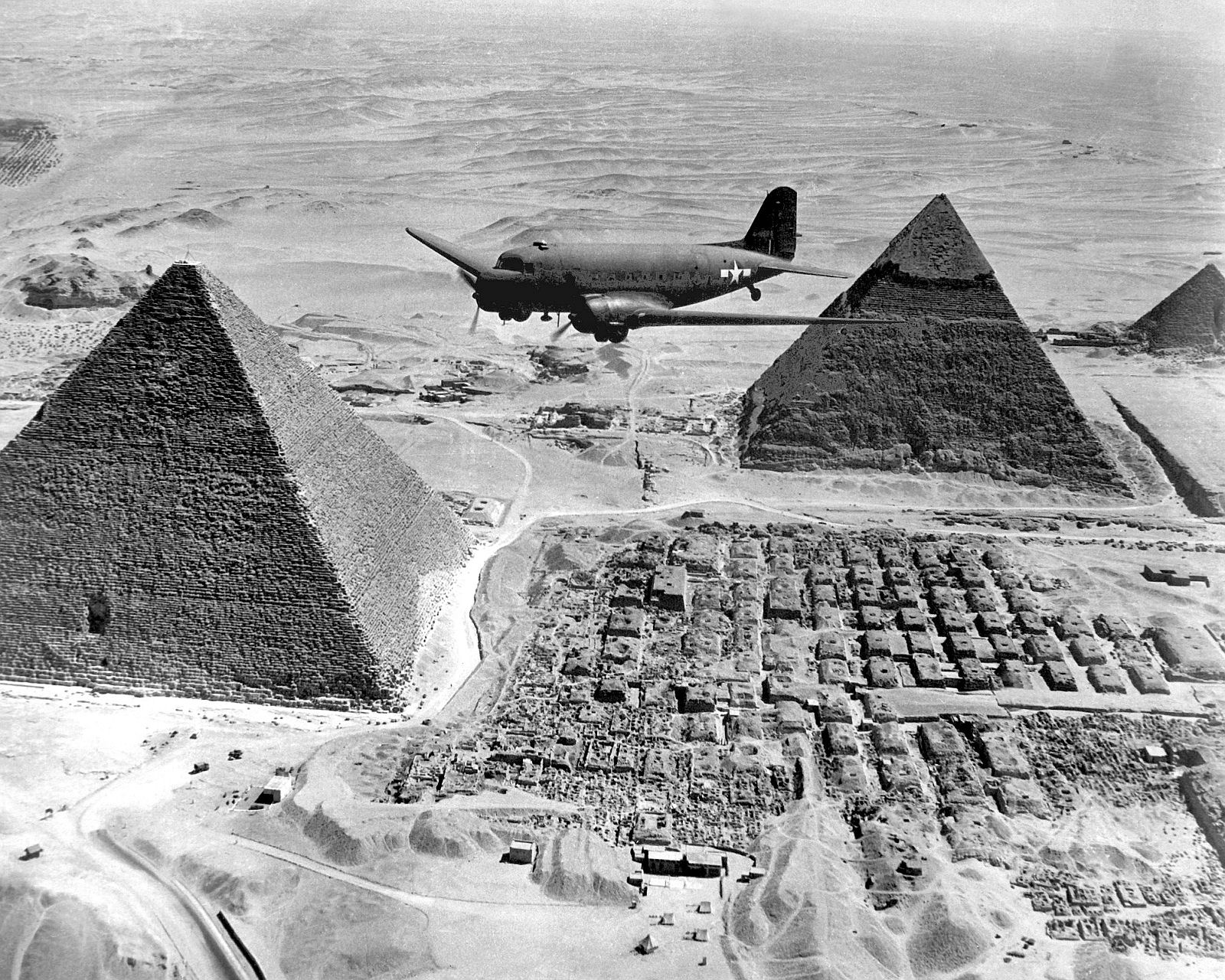
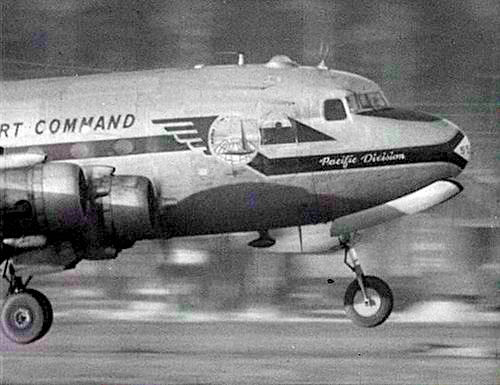
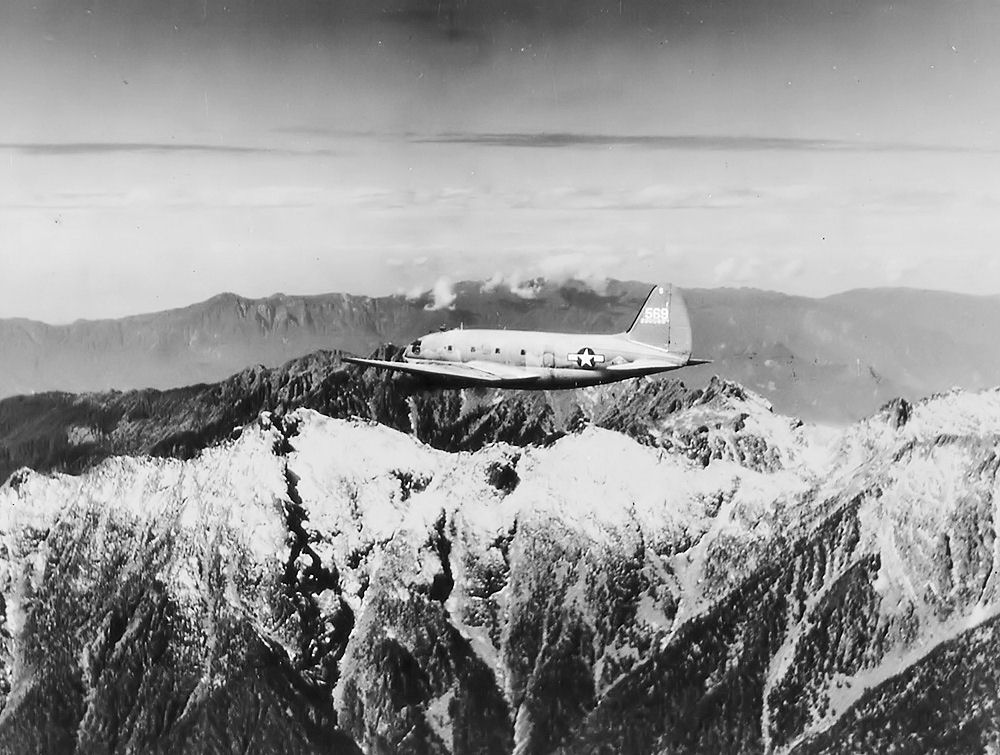
- Air Transport Command C-47 Skytrain flying over the Pyramids, 1944 C-54 Skymaster of the ATC Pacific Division taking off C-46 Commando flying "The Hump" over the Himalayan Mountain Range from Burma to China, 1945
- Active: 1942–1948
- Country: United States
- Branch: United States Army Air Forces
- Role: Worldwide transport of aircraft, personnel and cargo
- Size: 11,000 personnel at creation (June 1942); 30,518 personnel; 346 transports (December 1942); 209,201 personnel; 3,224 transports (August 1945)
- Engagements: World War II: American Theater; Asia-Pacific Theater; EAME Theater

Insignia
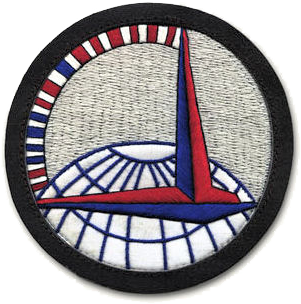
- Patch with Air Transport Command emblem(Approved 30 November 1942)

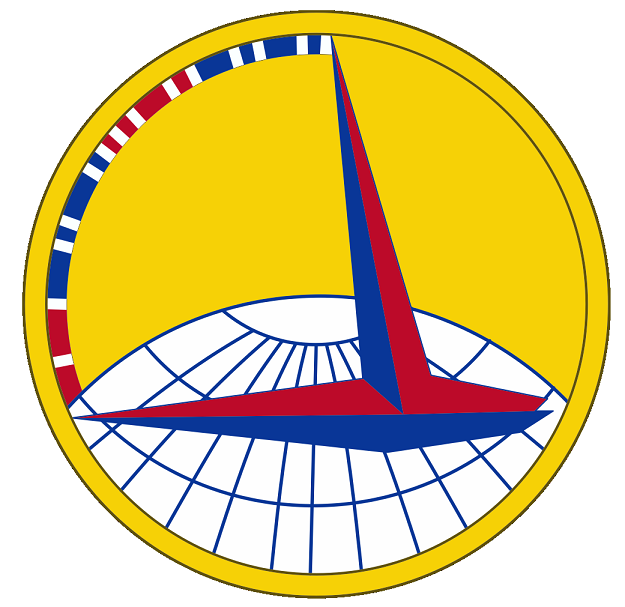
- Air Corps Ferrying Command Distinctive Badge (Approved 14 November 1941)

The Air Transport Command (ATC) was a United States Air Force unit that was created during World War II as the strategic airlift component of the United States Army Air Forces.

It had two main missions, the first being the delivery of supplies and equipment between the United States and the overseas combat theaters; the second was the ferrying of aircraft from the manufacturing plants in the United States to where they were needed for training or for operational use in combat. ATC also operated a worldwide air transportation system for military personnel.

Inactivated on 1 June 1948, the Air Transport Command was the precursor to what became the Military Air Transport Service in 1948 and was redesignated Military Airlift Command (MAC) in 1966. It was consolidated with MAC in 1982, providing a continuous history of long range airlift through 1992 when the mission was transferred to today's Air Mobility Command.

== History ==
By no means least among the achievements of the Army Air Forces (AAF) in World War II was its development of a worldwide system of air transport. The development of transport aircraft in the 1920s and 1930s added a new dimension to the art of warfare, and around its varied capacities the AAF built an air transportation system such as had never before been envisaged. That system, and its functions, soon became synonymous with the organization which controlled it, the Air Transport Command.

=== Origins ===
ATC's origins begin during World War I with the need to transport aircraft supplies and materiel from the aircraft manufacturers to the maintenance facilities supporting the training bases in the United States. Railroads were used to move the equipment and aircraft from one base to another and to the Ports of Embarkation along the East Coast for subsequent sea shipment to the battlefields of France.

It wasn't until the 1920s that the development of cargo and personnel transport aircraft began with aircraft such as the Boeing Model 40. From 1926 until 1942, the Air Corps’ logistical responsibilities were vested in the Office of the Chief of the Air Corps Materiel Division, with headquarters at Wright Field, Ohio and with four major depots (at Sacramento, California; San Antonio, Texas; Fairfield, Ohio; and Middletown, Pennsylvania) distributed over the United States. In the early 1930s, the Air Corps began formally experimenting with the systematic use of air transport for the distribution of aviation supplies. The Materiel Division in 1932 established a provisional 1st Air Transport Group with four transport squadrons, each of them equipped with Bellanca Aircruisers and Douglas DC-2s, intended to serve one of the four major air depots in the distribution of spare parts to Army airbases. The group, redesignated the 10th Transport Group in 1937, also transported supplies from one depot to another.

=== Lend Lease ===
With the outbreak of war in Europe in 1939, several European governments approached the United States for military equipment. They needed immediate help for the battles they might very soon have to fight on their own soil against invading German armies. The French ordered Douglas DB-7 (A-20) two-engine light bombers; Curtiss P-36 Hawks, and some Curtiss P-40D Warhawks, although the P-40s were never delivered. However, it was Britain's Royal Air Force which needed massive reinforcement, especially after the losses it incurred on the continent during the German invasion of the Low Countries and France during May 1940.

The idea of developing a regular military service for ferrying aircraft was the result of several factors. Production of aircraft by United States manufacturers was increasing for both the Army Air Corps and for purchase by the British. As produced and ready for delivery at the factory, these aircraft were flyable but also needed modifications before they were ready for combat service. It was advantageous to fly the aircraft to a separate modification center where changes could be made, rather than implementing these changes on the production line that would interrupt production.

United States civilian pilots, contracted by the British, would pick up their aircraft at the production facility and fly them to designated transfer points in the Montreal area where the modifications could be made. From Montreal, a Canadian civilian agency under contract to the British government began ferrying US-built bombers across the North Atlantic from Newfoundland to Prestwick (near Glasgow) (Scotland / UK) under the auspices of a private British company, set up by the British Government for that purpose. By ferrying these bombers under their own power, vital shipping space was saved and factory-to-combat delivery time was cut from approximately three months to less than ten days.

However, the British Government had limited funds, and was rapidly running out of resources for the purchase of war materiel of all types from the United States. In the spring of 1941, the Roosevelt Administration was committed to give all possible help, short of actual combat, to the United Kingdom and the remnants of her allies against Nazi Germany.

With the passage of the Lend-Lease Act in March 1941 the United States stated its intention to assist the British in its war efforts and was a statement of the desire of Congress and the people of the United States to that effect. With that clear intention, the doors were opened for larger numbers of aircraft to be sent to the Royal Air Force to defend Great Britain. It was also clear that the pioneering efforts of the British would have to be expanded to accommodate the increased number of aircraft. However, the United States was not a belligerent nation and it was also a period of extreme diplomatic delicacy. For example, until late summer in 1940, the United States interpreted the Neutrality Acts of the 1930s as forbidding American pilots from flying the aircraft purchased by the British across the US-Canada border. Instead, they were landed beside the United States side of the border, towed across the border to Canada, and flown away by Canadian pilots.

These shipments to the British caused a shortage in the United States of multi-engine aircraft in particular. Air Corps units were in need of training in long-range navigation, weather and radio-flying that a coast-to-coast ferrying service would give them in the latest models of aircraft. On 12 May 1941 the Office of the Chief of Air Corps (OCAC) was notified by the War Department that he was authorized for training purposes to have military pilots conduct cross-country flights in aircraft destined for use by the British Government for training purposes.

On 12 April 1941 plans were presented to the OCAC for the construction of a landing field on the west coast of Greenland for the staging of aircraft via Newfoundland, Greenland and Iceland to the United Kingdom. This would make possible the ferrying of medium and light bombers across the North Atlantic Ocean.

=== Air Corps Ferrying Command ===
Long Beach Army Air Field California Sixth Ferrying Group book

The British ferrying service was well under way when the Lend-Lease Act became law on 11 March 1941. With the North Atlantic sea lanes vulnerable to German U-boat attacks, Major General Henry H. Arnold established the Air Corps Ferrying Command on 29 May 1941, to deliver lend-lease aircraft overseas from the US. Commanded and organized by Brig. Gen. Robert Olds, the mission of the new command was, first, "to move aircraft by air from factories to such terminals as may be designated by the Chief of the Air Corps," and second, "to maintain such special air ferry services [i.e., air transport services] as may be required to meet specific situations." These were broad powers, and working within them, the Ferrying Command eventually expanded far beyond the limits imagined by those responsible for its creation. The second assignment provided specific authority for the establishment of a military air transport service over the North Atlantic between the US and the United Kingdom, a project which had been under consideration for some months.

Ferrying Command relied initially on two-engine and single-engine pilots detailed from the Air Force Combat Command (formerly GHQ Air Force) for thirty- to ninety-day tours of temporary duty. More highly qualified four-engine pilots of the Combat Command, as well as navigators and other crew members, were borrowed to fly the trans-Atlantic transport shuttle. In the summer and fall of 1941, approximately 200 pilots were trained at Barksdale Field, Louisiana, especially for ferrying duty, although they were assigned to the Combat Command and served, as did the others, on temporary-duty status with the Ferrying Command.

==== ACFC Domestic Wing ====
During the fall of 1941, Ferrying Command had assumed an additional responsibility for delivery of some AAF's own planes from factory to stations within the United States. After the Pearl Harbor attack, the ferry of aircraft within the United States quickly became a major function of the Command.

To ferry aircraft purchased by the Royal Air Force (RAF) from factories in the western and central United States to transfer points on the Atlantic seaboard required the establishment of routes over which the aircraft could be flown. Support stations were set up at civilian as well as military airports for the aircraft to be refueled and any necessary servicing performed. The aircraft factories, particularly the Boeing factory near Seattle and the Southern California plants of Lockheed, Consolidated, Douglas, North American and Vultee required a series of organizations to accept the aircraft from the manufacturer, and provide a ferrying crew to transport the aircraft.

In Southern California, the Long Beach Municipal Airport was leased by the War Department as a concentration point for all aircraft, except for B-24s to be ferried directly from the Consolidated plant. The manufacturers provided civilian pilots to deliver the aircraft from their facilities to Long Beach, where an Air Corps procurement representative inspected the aircraft and turned them over to Ferrying Command. This facility was designated as Headquarters, Western Division, Air Corps Ferrying Command.

Boeing Field, Seattle, was the location of the second concentration center, for planes manufactured by Boeing. Other concentration centers used civilian airfields as they became available, as happened in Detroit and Nashville.

From the West Coast, the ferrying routes (as initially laid down) and their corresponding transatlantic transport method were:

- Route One: Heavy bombers capable of crossing the North Atlantic by flight

Boeing Field to Wayne County Airport (Romulus, Michigan) to Montreal, Quebec.

- Route Two: Heavy bombers capable of crossing the North Atlantic by flight

Boeing Field to Salt Lake City, Utah; then via Omaha, Nebraska and Wayne County to Montreal

- Route Three: Short-range, light bombardment and training aircraft, to cross the North Atlantic by ship

Long Beach to Tucson, Arizona; thence via Midland and Dallas, Texas to New Orleans, Louisiana

- Route Four A: Short-range light bombardment and training aircraft, to cross by ship

Long Beach to Tucson; then via Midland; Tulsa, Oklahoma; Scott Field, Illinois; Patterson Field, Ohio and Wayne County to Montreal

- Route Four B: Short-range light bombardment and training aircraft, to cross by ship

Long Beach to Tucson; then via Midland; Dallas; Jackson, Mississippi; Atlanta, Fort Bragg, North Carolina and Bolling Field, D.C. to Mitchel Field, New York

At the end of each route was the designated transfer point at which final inspections were accomplished and the aircraft transferred from Air Corps jurisdiction to representatives of the RAF Ferry Command or the British Air Commission.

To replace and supplement Montreal as a transfer point, Ferrying Command then initiated development of airfields in northern Maine, some 300 miles nearer the United Kingdom than the Canadian city, at Presque Isle, Houlton and Millinocket. Although Millinocket was abandoned during construction, the Presque Isle Army Airfield and Houlton Army Airfield were completed and opened for service early in 1942. Once the ferried aircraft reached the transfer point, the crew returned to either Seattle or Los Angeles by rail.

After Pearl Harbor, the scope of Ferrying Command's mission within the United States expanded to the domestic ferrying of all multi-engine Army aircraft, all British and Lend-Lease aircraft, and with the air movement of troops by domestic airlines as well. On 3 January 1942, the wing was divided into six geographic sectors. The sectors and headquarters were:

* Northwest Sector, Boeing Field, Seattle, Washington

Responsible for all deliveries from Boeing Aircraft.
Redesignated 7th Ferrying Group, 28 May 1942.

* California Sector, Long Beach Municipal Airport, California

Served the Consolidated, North American, Vultee, Douglas, Lockheed, Ryan, Northrup and Vega factories in California.
Redesignated 6th Ferrying Group, 28 May 1942.

* Middle Western Sector, Hensley Field, Dallas, Texas

Responsible for ferrying the product of the Boeing, Cessna and Beech plants at Wichita, Kansas; the Douglas plant at Tulsa, Oklahoma, and the North American factories at Dallas and Kansas City, the Consolidated plant at Fort Worth, and the Martin factory at Omaha.
Redesignated 5th Ferrying Group, 28 May 1942.

* Nashville Sector, Berry Field, Nashville, Tennessee

Accepted Vultee planes produced in Nashville and Curtiss-Wright aircraft from St. Louis.
Redesignated 4th Ferrying Group, 28 May 1942.

* Detroit Sector, Wayne County Airport, Romulus, Michigan

Accepted deliveries from the Curtiss-Wright plants at Buffalo, New York and Columbus, Ohio; the Ford Willow Run plant (near Ypsilanti, Michigan) and the Bell factory at Buffalo.
Redesignated 3d Ferrying Group, 28 May 1942.

* Northeast Sector, Logan Field, Baltimore, Maryland

Served the Martin plant at Baltimore; the Fairchild factory at Hagerstown, Maryland; Piper plant at Lock Haven, Pennsylvania and the Grumman and Republic plants on Long Island.
Redesignated 2d Ferrying Group, 28 May 1942.

 

==== ACFC Foreign Wing ====
From the domestic ferrying assignment it was only a step to the Command taking over the responsibility for delivering or supervising the delivery of AAF and lend-lease aircraft to theaters of war scattered across the world.

After the US entered World War II, it became clear that the fastest and most economical method of moving combat aircraft from the factory to the front, which might be 10,000 to 15,000 miles away due to the worldwide nature of the conflict, was to ferry them under their own power. Also, to keep aircraft at their highest efficiency, an air transport system for the rapid delivery of spare engines and parts, auxiliary equipment of all kinds, flight crews, and ground personnel became an absolute necessity, and supplementary to the traditional and considerably slower method of surface transport.

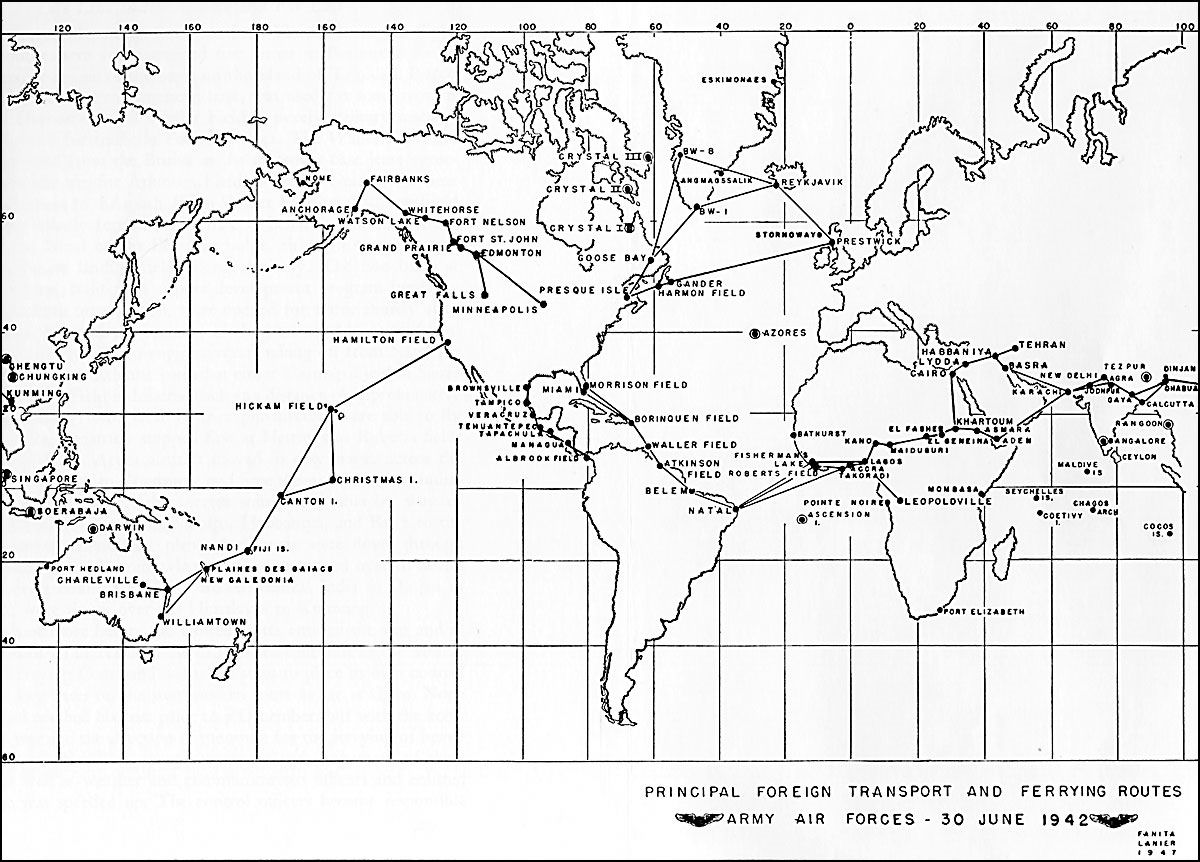
Major trunk air routes of AAF Ferrying Command, June 1942

During 1941, four major air routes were developed. These were:

- The North Atlantic route, earliest to be developed for military purposes, provided an air connection between the Eastern US and Britain, while
- The Northwest Staging Route connected mainland US with Alaska and the Soviet Union via Siberia.
- The South Pacific air ferry route in World War II connected the US via Hawaii with Australia and islands of the Western Pacific.
- The South Atlantic air ferry route linked the US with West Africa via Natal, Brazil, the Middle East, India and China.

Secondary routes between Australia and India, and between Australia and the Philippines were also developed. Later, a Mid-Atlantic route was developed via the Azores to link the US with Europe and North Africa. While this route was not opened until late 1943, the US and Britain were at all times prepared to occupy the Azores, had the security and future use of this route been threatened by the Axis Powers.

By early 1942, it had become clear that the Philippines could not be held, principally because the Japanese had cut the only sea and air lanes over which available reinforcements, such as they were, could reach General MacArthur. By the end of February 1942, the air connection between India and Australia was also cut due to the advance of Japanese forces into Southeast Asia, although some heavy bombers and other reinforcements from the US were able to get through before the Japanese captured Singapore and overran the Netherlands East Indies. Fortunately for the Allies, the five remaining major routes were held.

During 1942, the South Atlantic route to West Africa and beyond assumed an importance far surpassing that of any of the others. In contrast to the slowness of the North Atlantic, South Pacific and Alaskan routes, the South Atlantic airway immediately came to support a heavy volume of air traffic that, because only four former Pan American Clippers, two TWA Stratoliners, and 11 converted B-24 Liberators were capable of hauling cargo on the trans-Atlantic leg during the first six months of 1942, strained its facilities and personnel to the limit. Lend-lease aircraft and supplies were sent over the route to the British forces in Egypt and the Russians through Persia, with a smaller volume going via India into China.

The earliest heavy bomber reinforcements sent to the US Air Forces in the Southwest Pacific following the Japanese attack traveled over the route, prepared, briefed, and supported by the Ferrying Command, as were most of the aircraft and crews that would form the Ninth Air Force in the Middle East and the Tenth Air Force in India. Fighter aircraft for the Ninth and Tenth Air Forces and for the American Volunteer Group in China were shipped by water to the west coast of Africa where they were assembled and flown overland to their destinations. And, while ferrying operations were increasing steadily, the air transport service in support of both ferrying and combat operations was enlarged and extended, albeit in piecemeal fashion.

Later, a Mid-Atlantic route was developed via the Azores to link the US with Europe and North Africa. While this route was not opened until late 1943, the US and Britain were at all times prepared to occupy the Azores, had the security and future use of this route been threatened by the Axis Powers.

During the thirteen months of its existence, Ferrying Command had grown from an original staff of two officers and a civilian secretary to a strength of over 11,000 officers and enlisted men, in addition to its civilian employees and those of the civil air carriers operating under its supervision. As the name implies, ferrying had been its main job, and during the period its pilots ferried 13,595 aircraft to final domestic destinations, while 632 planes were delivered to foreign destinations under the supervision of the command.

=== Air Transport Command ===
==== Change of roles ====
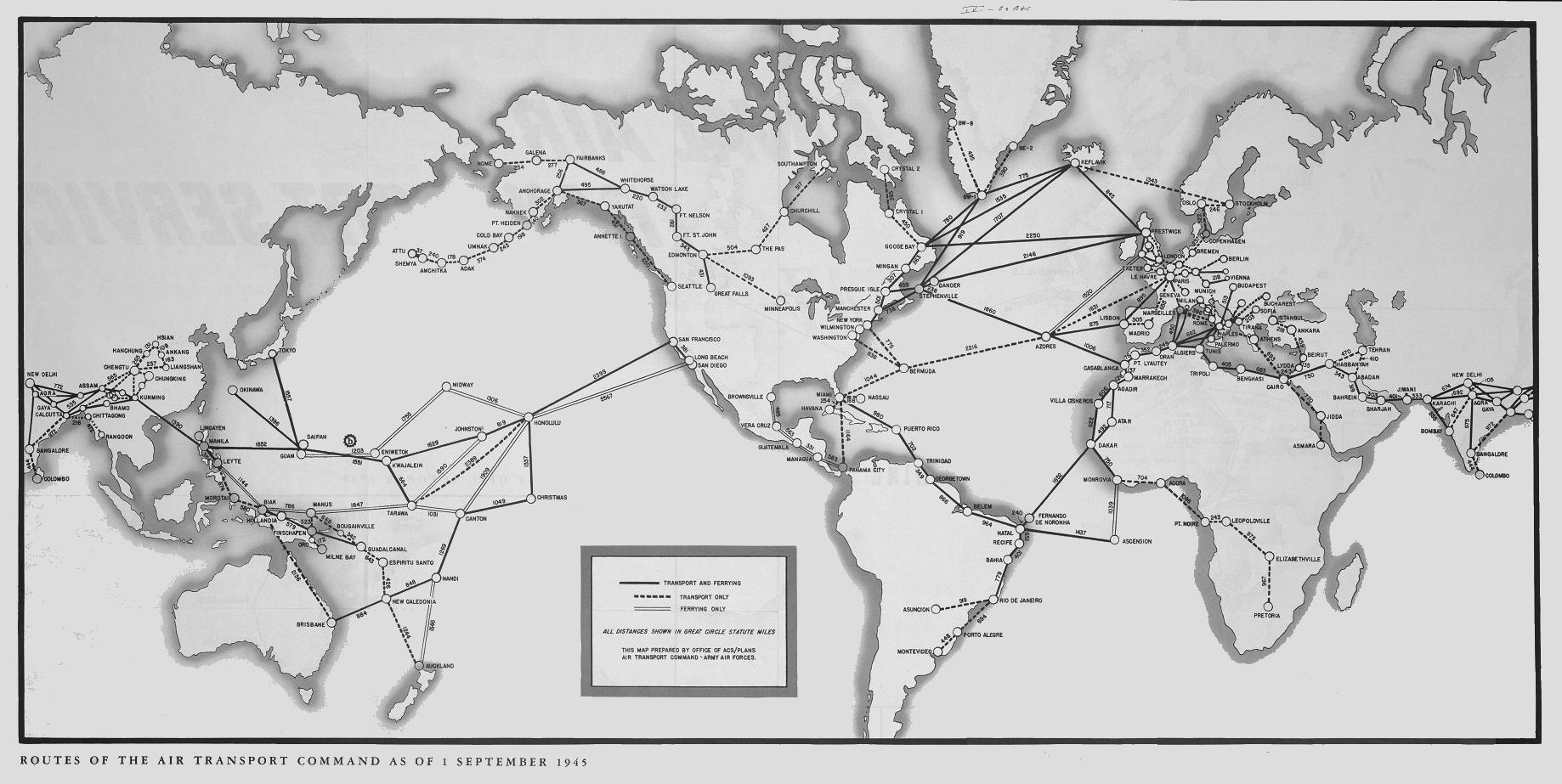
Air Transport Command major routes, 1 September 1945

Air transport services conducted by the Ferrying Command (before the Pearl Harbor attack), were first to Britain beginning July 1941 and later in October to Cairo. They were like courier services and were secondary to the major job for which the command was created, that of ferrying aircraft from US factories to Canada and onward to Britain or to US ports of embarkation. Probably no one then foresaw that a network of long-range transport routes, supporting the daily movement of hundreds of tons of supplies and thousands of passengers, would spread across the world and that daily flights to such remote areas as the Aleutians, Australia, the Philippines, India, and China would become commonplace.

Indeed, a limited view of the role of long-range air transportation in World War II persisted for some months after the US became an active belligerent. Not until the late spring and summer of 1942, when large backlogs of supplies awaiting air shipment to the front began to build up at ports of embarkation and when it became clear that almost unlimited demands would be made in future for the rapid movement of urgently needed materials and personnel, did the idea of air transport as a major instrument of logistics begin to take shape.

In order to operate a worldwide air logistics system, maximum use would have to be made of the planes, men, and facilities of the civil airlines. The Ferrying Command was in no position to expand its own military transport services. The Air Corps and the Air Transport Association of America (ATA), representing the domestic carriers, had developed a mobilization plan between 1936 and 1939 to provide this support through contract services. Roosevelt issued Executive Order 8974 on 13 December 1941, which gave the Secretary of War authority to nationalize the airlines, but except for several instances early in 1942 to meet specific emergencies, the order was not invoked. ATA president Edgar S. Gorrell, a colonel in the Air Service during World War I and the driving force behind pre-war creation of the mobilization plan, delivered immediate full cooperation of the airlines from the first day of the war and is credited with persuading Roosevelt not to nationalize the airlines.

The ferrying activity continued to increase as more aircraft were turned out by the factories, as new combat units became ready for deployment overseas, and as the need for battle replacements grew more and more emphasis came to be placed on the air transportation function. Air transport had passed beyond the stage of being primarily a courier service or an adjunct of ferrying; it was well on the way to becoming a major instrument of logistical support to combat operations on the ground and in the air.

At the time, commercial airlines possessed developed infrastructure, personnel trained previously in the military, and operational experiences. The Army Air Forces (AAF) was, however, a new organisation that did not have the same background in large scale scheduled transport services.

In January 1942, Arnold established the AAF Office of Civil Aviation and recalled the chairman of the Civil Aeronautics Administration, Donald H. Connolly, to military service, appointing him Military Director of Civil Aviation and directing him to use EO 8974 to transfer the CAA and its regulatory control of the airlines to the Army Air Forces. L. Welch Pogue, chairman of the safety agency for civil aviation, the Civil Aeronautics Board, then wrote to the White House advocating the establishment of a civilian air transportation service reporting directly to the President to operate airline contracts for the military, an idea that had been broached during the development period of ATA-Air Corps mobilization plan. In response, General Arnold proposed that the AAF instead control and direct such a service, primarily composed of pilots and aircraft contracted from U.S. civilian airlines.

==== Creation of the Air Transport Command ====
The Air Service Command (before October 1941 known as the Air Corps Maintenance Command) had been operating a well-established air transport service within the continental United States for months before the Ferrying Command was established, using the 50th Transport Wing to move technical cargo between air depots and subdepots. In the first half of 1941 the ASC moved more cargo domestically than all the civilian carriers in the United States. Several months after the war began, demands for materiel forced ASC to use civilian carriers on a contract basis, creating a Contract Air Cargo Division managed by former airline executives, who established routes outside the United States to Alaska, the upper Atlantic, and Central America. Many of the routes and services duplicated those of the Ferrying Command. Expedient attempts by Headquarters AAF to establish a clear division of authority were unsuccessful, particularly after the 50th Transport Wing was transferred at the end of April 1942 to a newly created organization, the "Air Transport Command" (a combat organization). This left ASC with only its civilian carriers, of which considerable friction existed with Ferrying Command which had let conflicting contracts to different carriers.

Arnold saw the need for unified control of air transport and bolstered by Pogue's memorandum, which recommended that at the least all Army air transportation should be unified under one command, submitted the issue to a board of officers with instructions to consider the whole problem. Before the board could make an official report, however, Arnold made a decision on 20 June 1942 which embodied substantially Pogue's second recommendation. The Ferrying Command was renamed the Air Transport Command and the organization already bearing that name became the I Troop Carrier Command to reflect its mission of training crews and units for the combat lifts of parachute and airborne infantry.

A change of command at AAF Ferrying Command took place in the meantime. In March 1942 General Olds was stricken with a heart attack, and was replaced by Colonel (eventually Lieutenant General) Harold L. George, who remained as ATC's wartime commander.

Effective 1 July 1942, the new Air Transport Command was given what the official history of the AAF described as "sweeping responsibilities":

- The ferrying of all aircraft within the United States and to destinations outside of the United States as directed by the Commanding General, Army Air Forces.
- The control, operation, and maintenance of establishments and facilities on air routes outside of the United States.
- The transportation by air of personnel, materiel, and mail for all War Department agencies, except those served by Troop Carrier units.

In addition, before the end of June plans by the Army's Services of Supply to create its own air transportation service were halted when the SOS agreed to transfer to the AAF all of its air transportation responsibilities and its responsibility for setting priorities for travel by military and commercial aircraft. The Contract Air Cargo Division was terminated by ASC and its personnel transferred to ATC to end the division of responsibility.

The new Air Transport Command was initially only a semi-military organization, with most of its leadership coming from the ranks of airline executives who accepted direct USAAF commissions, usually as colonels or majors. Until 1944, ATC also drew heavily on the airlines for manpower, using experienced civil airline pilots, radio operators, and other aircrew personnel from the airlines to crew transports that had been purchased by the Army from civilian sources. ATC's original mission was ferrying airplanes to overseas destinations, a mission that had been originally performed by the AAF Ferrying Command that preceded it and from which ATC headquarters military personnel were drawn. As the war progressed, ATC's air transport division became more and more involved in transporting military personnel and cargo overseas.

At the time it was redesignated and given its enlarged mission, the command was already in the process of reorganization.

==== Operations ====
The newly designated Air Transport Command consisted of two main divisions, the Ferrying Division and the Air Transportation Division, corresponding roughly to the two primary responsibilities of the command. The ATC Ferrying Division was responsible for the transfer of combat aircraft to overseas bases, and their replacement. Thousands of bombers, transport aircraft and fighters flown by combat crews on their way overseas were under ATC control during these movements. Ferrying of combat aircraft by ATC personnel became a major ATC mission to the end of the war as vast numbers of replacement aircraft had to be transferred from factory to combat theaters. The command ferried 30,000 aircraft in 1942, 72,000 in 1943, 108,000 in 1944, and 57,000 in 1945, for a total of more than 267,000 in all.

In addition, five major field organizations, known as wings, were constituted on 12 June 1942 and activated at various dates during the latter part of the month. Initially, they were known as the 23d through the 27th AAF Ferrying wings, but the command quickly requested and secured a change to more descriptive geographical names. On 5 July, they were redesignated the North Atlantic, Caribbean, South Atlantic, Africa-Middle East, and South Pacific wings. Over the course of the war, additional wings and divisions were created as the scope and complexity of the command increased.

More than 130 two- and four-engine transport aircraft had become available to the command by 1 July 1942, of which 10 or 15 were being flown by military crews and the remainder by the contract carriers. Many of these had come from new production, some were acquired from Air Service Command, but others became available as the result of a presidential order of 6 May directing the Secretary of War to commandeer all transports of the DC-3 type operated by the domestic air carriers in excess of 200 and to refit them "for such transport services as will most effectively serve the war purposes of the United Nations." The transfer of the aircraft from the airlines to the War Department made it possible for the former also to release additional crews for employment in military operations.

In the beginning of ATC operations, the Douglas C-47 Skytrain was the primary transport plane in use. At first, the C-47 was often fitted with long-range tanks for long flights, but as larger multi-engine aircraft became available, the C-47 was redeployed for use on shorter routes.

In 1942, the Consolidated C-87 Liberator Express, a transport version of the B-24 Liberator bomber, was adopted for service with the ATC. The C-87 had a much longer range and higher service ceiling, making it a better choice for over-water transport flights, but its hurried conversion from a dedicated bomber design resulted in inevitable compromises that affected its reliability in service.

In 1942, at the personal request of General 'Hap' Arnold, C. R. Smith, formerly president of American Airlines, was commissioned a colonel in ATC and made its executive officer, thereafter assuming the positions of Chief of Staff and Deputy Commander. During his tenure as Chief of Staff, Smith was largely responsible for ATC's considerable expansion in operations. In the same year, Smith proposed that ATC assume responsibility for the Hump airlift operation, as he believed that ATC would do a better job of transporting cargo to China. However, due to a lack of navigation aids, personnel, suitable airfields and maintenance facilities, and above all, sufficient multi-engine transport aircraft suited to the difficult flight conditions, tonnage levels flown to China over The Hump did not appreciably increase until late 1943.

As the war progressed, ATC received improved aircraft types for transport duty, including the Curtiss-Wright C-46 Commando and the Douglas C-54 Skymaster, a militarized transport version of the DC-4. The C-54 in particular took over the C-87's duties in long-distance, over-water transport flights. In the China-India theater, the C-54, with nearly five times the load capacity of the C-47 and twice that of the C-46, significantly increased cargo tonnage levels flown to China, becoming the primary lifter for Hump operations. Even though the C-54 had a service ceiling of only 12,000 feet, plans were made to replace all the C-87s in the Hump operation with Skymasters by October 1945, and have 540 assigned by April 1946 to bring load capability up to 86,000 tons monthly.

ATC transports were used primarily to deliver high value cargo and important personnel to overseas destinations. For example, ATC C-87s delivered new engines to Libya to replace those worn out on the B-24s used on the famous low-level mission against Ploiești. An emergency shipment of artillery fuzes helped win the battle of Tobruk. When the first B-29s were sent to China, advance party personnel and additional combat crew personnel proceeded the bombers aboard ATC C-87s. On return flights, C-87s and C-54s brought back combat crews who had finished their combat tours and were returning to the States. At the end of the war, ATC C-54s transported 11th Airborne Division personnel from Okinawa to Japan.

While little known the Caribbean Division And South Atlantic Divisions of ATC also operated its own small navy for rescue of downed pilots comprising converted submarine chasers and Catalina seaplanes. While not limited to rescuing ATC pilots the main role was that of insuring a rescue of ATC pilots who were downed on the first leg of the southern trans-Atlantic route to Europe and SE Asia. In areas where ATC aircraft flew where there were a possibility of hostile aircraft or ships, other services provided air to sea rescue. ATC rescue services operated only in areas where there was nil chance of armed encounter.

By the end of World War II, Air Transport Command had developed into a huge military air carrier with a worldwide route pattern. From an organization of approximately 37,000 personnel (6,500 of them overseas) in December 1942, it numbered nearly 210,000 in August 1945, the bulk stationed overseas (150,000). By the end of the war the command had 3,090 major transports assigned. Although in the first half of 1944 the C-46 appeared to be headed for ascendancy as the predominant transport type of the command, and ATC more than tripled its inventory of C-54s in the final year of the war to 839 transports, the C-47 remained the workhorse transport of ATC throughout the conflict, never exceeded in total by any other type. Its numbers remained steady throughout 1942 and 1943, but increased dramatically in the last 18 months of the war, rising to a total of 1,341.

Routes had been established to places where aircraft had been unheard of before the war. Airline personnel who had never left the United States before joining the military had become veterans of long over-water flights to the remotest regions of earth. In its final full month of wartime operations (July 1945), ATC carried 275,000 passengers (50,000 domestically) and 100,000 tons of mail and cargo, 96.7% of it overseas.

=== Sports ===
The Air Transport Command fielded the Rockets football team with several notable former college and professional players, such as Vernon Martin of the Pittsburgh Steelers.

=== Postwar era ===
With the end of the war, the Air Transport Command found itself in limbo. Senior USAAF authorities considered ATC to be a wartime necessity that was no longer needed, and expected its civilian personnel, including former airline pilots, to return to their peacetime occupations. Senior ATC officers, on the other hand, thought that ATC should be developed into a national government operated airline, an idea that was soundly opposed by the airline industry. While the war had firmly established the necessity of a troop carrier mission, most military officers believed the role performed by ATC should be provided by contract carriers.

When the United States Air Force was established as a separate service in 1947, the Air Transport Command was not established as one of its missions. The ATC commander and his staff took it upon themselves to convince the new civilian leadership of the newly created Department of Defense (DOD) (and Secretaries of the Army and Air Force) that ATC had a mission. They seized upon testimony by former Troop Carrier Command commander Major General Paul Williams that the Air Force should have a long-range troop deployment capability, and began advocating that ATC transports could be used to deploy troops. Williams had been pressing for the development of a long-range troop carrier airplane when he made his statement.

The DOD believed it should have its own air transport service and decided that ATC should become the Military Air Transport Service, supported by the USAF, even though not listed as a formal military mission. When the ATC commander wrote a mission statement for the proposed new command he inserted "deployment of troops" as a mission, although the change had never been formally requested, the Secretary of the Air Force either allowed it to remain or overlooked it when signing the mission statement.

=== Lineage ===
- Established as the Air Corps Ferrying Command on 29 May 1941

Redesignated Army Air Forces Ferry Command on 9 March 1942
Redesignated Army Air Forces Ferrying Command on 31 March 1942
Redesignated Air Transport Command on 1 July 1942
Discontinued on 1 June 1948

- Consolidated on 13 May 1982 with Military Airlift Command

=== Assignments ===
- Office of the Chief of Air Corps, 29 May 1941
- Headquarters, United States Army Air Forces, 9 March 1942
- Headquarters, United States Air Force, 18 September 1947 – 1 June 1948

=== Headquarters ===
- Gravelly Point, Virginia, 29 May 1941
- The Pentagon, Virginia, 15 January 1943 – 1 June 1948

=== Major Components ===
==== Ferrying Division ====
Established 1 July 1942, to replace the Domestic Wing, Army Air Forces Ferrying Command, established 28 December 1941 as the Domestic Division ACFC and redesignated Domestic Wing, AAFFC on 26 February 1942.

Initially conducted aircraft ferrying operations within the United States ("Zone of the Interior") in six regions. The division was reorganized 22 October 1944 into three component ferrying wings (East, West, and Central). The Ferrying Division absorbed the Domestic Transportation Wing (created March 1943 for military passenger and cargo service within the ZI) on 27 November 1944.

Operated primarily by civilian contract pilots, including the Women Airforce Service Pilots (WASP), the Ferrying Division moved aircraft and parts from manufacturing plants in the United States to and between various training bases within the US and to Ports of Embarkation for overseas shipment (Hamilton Field, California; Morrison Field, Florida; Presque Isle Field, Maine; and Anchorage-Elmendorf Field, Alaska). From the Ports of Embarkation, aircraft were flown to final overseas destinations primarily by contracted civil airline pilots or former airline pilots serving in the AAF. The ATC Ferrying Division was also responsible for the preparation for and movement of combat units overseas and for the movement of replacement aircraft and crews, who were temporarily assigned to the ATC Ferrying Division from the time they left the United States until they arrived at their assigned theater.

==== Air Transportation Division ====
Established 28 December 1941 as the Foreign Division, ACFC; redesignated Foreign Wing, AAFFC on 26 February 1942; redesignated Air Transportation Division 1 July 1942. The division was dissolved in March 1943 and its wings placed directly under command of Headquarters ATC.

North America

- Alaskan Wing (redesignated Alaskan Division on 1 July 1944)

Established October 1942. Supported Eleventh Air Force in Alaska and the Aleutian Islands. Controlled the Alaska-Siberia Route (ALSIB) to transport airborne lend-lease aircraft and support material from the Minneapolis, Minnesota and Great Falls, Montana via Central and Western Canada to Ladd Field, Alaska, where Soviet pilots collected the aircraft to fly them westward to air bases in Siberia. Also operated transport route into Northern Canada.

Central/South America

- Caribbean Wing (established as 27th AAF Ferrying Wing 19 June 1942; redesignated Caribbean Wing on 1 July 1942; redesignated Caribbean Division on 1 July 1944)

Transported aircraft, personnel and cargo from South Florida airfields (Morrison Field) to Waller Field, Trinidad over the South Atlantic Route. During World War II, over 16,000 tactical and cargo aircraft transited this route, carrying over 100,000 crew personnel and passengers. Also operated transport routes to Havana, (Cuba); Nassau, (Bahamas); and Sixth Air Force Caribbean lend-lease bases, and to Panama and Puerto Rico. Also operated an aircraft ferrying route between Brownsville, Texas and the Panama Canal Zone via Mexico and Central America. From Howard Field, Panama Canal Zone, it flew a route to the Galapagos Islands and along the west coast of South America to Salinas, Ecuador and to Talara, (Peru).

- South Atlantic Wing (established as 24th AAF Ferrying Wing 27 June 1942; redesignated South Atlantic Wing on 1 July 1942; redesignated South Atlantic Division on 1 July 1944)

Responsible for operating the South Atlantic Route from Waller Field, Trinidad along the north-eastern coast of South America to Natal (Brazil) and from there across the South Atlantic Ocean via Ascension Island to West Africa. It also operated routes along the eastern coast of Brazil to Montevideo (Uruguay) and to Asunción (Paraguay).

Europe

- North Atlantic Wing (established as 23d AAF Ferrying Wing 20 June 1942; redesignated North Atlantic Wing on 1 July 1942; redesignated North Atlantic Division on 1 July 1944)

Operated North Atlantic Route for aircraft, personnel and cargo from Presque Isle AAF to Prestwick Airport, Scotland, via Greenland, Iceland or directly from RCAF Station Gander and Stephenville Air Base in Newfoundland. Operated transport routes to Goose Air Base in Labrador and onward to bases in Greenland. In 1945, it operated a transport route from Iceland to Oslo, Norway, and to Stockholm, Sweden.

- European Wing (redesignated European Division on 1 July 1944)

Created in July 1941 at Prestwick Airport (Scotland) as a courier service. Received aircraft flown from the United States across the North Atlantic Route. On 19 June 1942, it took over the transatlantic operations from TWA and Northeast Airlines at Prestwick to ferry passengers to the European Theater. Established January 1943 as European Wing. It served as the operational component of ATC in Europe. Initially, it flew transport operations from the United Kingdom to Spain and Portugal, later on also to French Morocco. Clandestine transport operations were also made into Occupied Europe and to Scandinavia in 1943. Routes were established into France in 1944 and throughout Occupied Germany, Italy and to the Balkans and Greece in 1945.

- Atlantic Wing

Operated the Mid-Atlantic Route from the Eastern United States (New York City, Washington DC, Miami) to Bermuda and on to the Azores / Portugal to ferry aircraft to England from early 1943. Later operated routes from the Azores to Portugal and France to provide connections with intra-European routes after 1944 as part of the North Atlantic Division.
Africa/Middle East

- Middle East Wing (established as 26th AAF Ferrying Wing 27 June 1942; redesignated 1 July 1942 as Africa-Middle East Wing; redesignated June 1943 as Middle East Wing)

Delivered lend-lease aircraft, personnel and cargo from Cairo, Egypt to destinations in the Middle East. Operated the Eastern Mediterranean Route via Lydda (British-Mandated Palestine) and Beirut (Lebanon) to Adana (Turkey. It also ferried lend-lease aircraft to Tehran (Iran) for onward shipment to Russia via Baku. A connecting route linked Baghdad (Iraq) with Karachi, India, along the Persian Gulf coast.

- Central African Wing (redesignated Central African Division on 1 July 1944)

Established June 1943 from a split of the Africa-Middle East Wing with headquarters in Khartoum, Sudan. Responsible for moving aircraft, personnel and cargo from West African transport hubs over the Trans-Africa Route via Khartoum to Cairo (Egypt) and to Aden (South Arabia) and on to Karachi (India). This was discontinued when the route along the coast of West Africa from Dakar (Senegal) to French Morocco became available in 1943. Also operated a transport route to Leopoldville (Belgian Congo) for the transport of uranium to the United States. This route was later extended to Pretoria (South Africa Rep.) via Elizabethville (Belgian Congo).

- North African Wing (redesignated North African Division on 1 July 1944)

Established June 1943 from a split of the Africa-Middle East Wing. Moved aircraft, supplies and cargo from West African transport hub supporting Twelfth and Fifteenth Air Forces. Also part of South Atlantic Route transport extension via West Africa to Casablanca (French Morocco) and to Britain. Operated the Mediterranean Air Transport Service from Casablanca (French Morocco) to Cairo (Egypt) and later from Algiers (Algeria) to Naples (Italy) in 1944.

Pacific/CBI Theater

- Pacific Wing (established as 25th AAF Ferrying Wing 27 June 1942; redesignated South Pacific Wing on 1 July 1942; redesignated Pacific Wing in January 1943; redesignated Pacific Division on 24 July 1944)

Operated the South Pacific Air Route from Hamilton Field, California via Hickam Field, Hawaii to either Brisbane or Williamstown, Australia, via Nadi, Fiji and Noumea, New Caledonia for cargo and passengers. Later on, links were established with New Zealand and via Honiara, Solomon Islands with Hollandia and Biak, Dutch East Indies.

- India-China Wing (redesignated India-China Division on 1 July 1944.)

Established 1 December 1942. Responsible for transport operations across the Himalayan Mountains ("The Hump") between airfields in India and China, formerly performed by the 10th AF India-China Ferrying Command, and operated a western Indian sector in Karachi. Responsible for the materiel support of the Fourteenth Air Force in China and of the Tenth Air Force operations. Four component wings in ICD: Assam Wing (activated 1 July 1944); India Wing (1 July 1944); Bengal Wing (1 December 1944); China Wing (1 December 1944)

- West Coast Wing

Established January 1943 from a split of the South Pacific Wing. Operated a transport route from Seattle, Washington to Elmendorf AAF, Alaska, along the coast of British Columbia primarily to deliver Boeing aircraft to Alaska. Component of Pacific Division 1 August 1944.

- Central Pacific Wing (activated 1 August 1944, Pacific Division)

Operated route from Hawaii via Marshall Islands to Mariana Islands for logistical support for Seventh and Twentieth Air Forces in the Marianas. The route was later extended to Manila, Philippines; Okinawa; and lastly to Tokyo, Japan in 1945. A transport route was established from Manila to Kunming, China.

- Southwest Pacific Wing (activated on 1 August 1944, Pacific Division)

Logistical support for Fifth and Thirteenth Air Forces in New Guinea and later to the Philippines.

- Eastern Pacific Wing (activated on 10 April 1946)
- Western Pacific Wing (activated on 10 April 1946)

Postwar reorganization of Pacific transport routes within Far East Air Force connecting Hawaii, Australia, the Philippines, Okinawa and Japan.

=== Installations ===
Gore Field, Great Falls, Montana
7th Ferrying Group
557th Army Air Forces Base Unit
Embarkation Base, Alaska Route
Used for ferrying aircraft to Alaska from western US manufacturing plants.
Note: Nearby Great Falls Army Air Base was Headquarters, ATC Eastern Pacific Wing (Formerly Alaskan Sector, Continental Division, ATC)

Hamilton Field, California
Headquarters ATC Pacific Division, West Coast Wing
18th Ferrying Group
1503d Army Air Forces Base Unit
Embarkation Base, Pacific Route

Morrison Field, West Palm Beach, Florida
Headquarters ATC Caribbean Wing
26th Ferrying Squadron
1103d Army Air Forces Base Unit
Embarkation Base, South Atlantic Route

Presque Isle Field, Maine
Headquarters ATC North Atlantic Wing
23d Army Air Forces Ferrying Wing
1380th Army Air Forces Base Unit
Embarkation Base, North Atlantic Route

Houlton Field, Maine
Opened 1941, transfer point for planes sold to RAF
378th Army Air Forces Base Unit
North Atlantic Route Staging Base

Lunken Airport, Cincinnati, Ohio
Used by ATC for final check and inspection of Foreign Military Sales aircraft (Concentration Command)
586th Army Air Forces Base Unit
Staging Base for RAF Sales

New Castle County Airport, Wilmington, Delaware
2d Ferrying Group
ATC Long-Range Navigation School
552d Army Air Forces Base Unit
North Atlantic Route Staging Base

Wayne County Airport, Romulus, Michigan
3d Ferrying Group
553d Army Air Forces Base Unit
Alaska Route Staging Base, also RAF Sales to Canada. Planned "Crimson Route" Embarkation Base (never developed)

Charleston Army Airfield, South Carolina
To ATC April 1944. Became Sub-Base of Homestead AAF FL Four Engine Pilot Training School
Sub Unit C, 113th Army Air Forces Base Unit (Combat Crew Training School, Heavy)
ATC 5th Replacement Training Unit

Greenwood Army Airfield, Mississippi
To ATC January 1945, became Ferrying Division Single, Two Engine Pilot Training School
590th Army Air Forces Base Unit
ATC 6th Replacement Training Unit

Homestead Army Airfield, Florida
ATC Four Engine Training School
427th Army Air Forces Base Unit
ATC 2d Operational Training Unit

Palm Springs Army Airfield, California
ATC Specialized Fighter Transition School
459th Army Air Forces Base Unit
ATC 4th Operational Training Unit
Moved in the spring of 1944 to Brownsville Army Airfield, Texas.

Reno Army Airfield, Nevada
ATC High Altitude Training School (C-46/C-47 for "Hump" Pilots)
566th Army Air Forces Base Unit
ATC 3d Operational Training Unit

Rosecrans Army Airfield, St. Joseph, Missouri
ATC Specialized Night and Instrument Training School
561st Army Air Forces Base Unit
ATC 1st Operational Training Unit

Wold/Chamberlain Field, Minneapolis, Minnesota
7th Ferrying Group (Detachment)
Embarkation Base, Alaska Route
Used for ferrying aircraft to Alaska from eastern US manufacturing plants.

Ferrying Division found it necessary to provide transition instruction on many planes, so its pilots could qualify on all major U.S. models. A transition school was established at Long Beach Army Air Field ferrying base in California as early as July 1941; others were set up in the spring of 1942 at Boeing Field, Seattle, Berry Field, Nashville (568th Army Air Forces Base Unit), Romulus Army Airfield, Detroit, Baltimore Municipal Airport, Maryland, and at Hensley Field, Dallas.

=== Overseas Stations ===
Overseas ATC stations are listed and described in the following articles:

- Alaska Route

Also known as the Northwest Staging Route. List of ATC stations located in Canada and the Alaska Territory, originating at Great Falls Army Air Base, Montana and Wold/Chamberlain Field, Minnesota; terminating at Ladd Army Airfield, Alaska Territory. Ladd is where Soviet pilots took over the ferrying mission into the Soviet Union

- Caribbean Route

Part of the South Atlantic Air Ferry Route. List of ATC stations in the Caribbean, originating at Morrison Field, Florida; terminating at Atkinson Field, British Guiana.

- Central African Route

Extension of the South Atlantic Air Ferry Route, set up by Pan American pilots prior to the Axis capitulation in Tunisia in 1943. Originated at Roberts Field, Liberia to Khartoum Airport, Khartoum, north to Payne Field, Cairo Egypt.
The ATC Middle East Wing flew from Khartoum across Arabia to RAF Sharjah in the United Arab Emirates; The 14th Ferrying Group flew south to Wonderboom Airport, Union of South Africa, carrying valuable minerals from Central and Southern Africa.
After September 1943, The ATC North Atlantic Division flew from Dakar Airport, Senegal via French Morocco, Algeria, Tunisia, Libya into Payne Field, Cairo Egypt.

- India-China Route

Flown by the India-China Division. Began at RAF Jawani, India, a former British Imperial Airways airport on the Cairo-Karachi route, used by ATC as a refueling field for ferrying aircraft over Middle East or Central African Route to Karachi. Crossed India to Chabua Airfield in the Assam Valley which was used as a transshipment point for supplies, equipment and aircraft ferried to Kunming Airport China over the Himalayas from Northeast India.

- Mid-Atlantic Route

Established in 1943 after the Portuguese government allowed British Leases in the Azores. Flown by long-range C-54s fitted with auxiliary fuel tanks only from Morrison Field, Florida via Kindley Field, Bermuda, across the Atlantic to one of three RAF airfields in the Azores. Then connected to Anfa Airport, Casablanca, French Morocco.

- North Pacific Route

Flown by the West Coast Wing between Gray Army Airfield, Washington along the British Columbian Coast to Elmendorf Field, Alaska then on to Alexai Point Army Airfield in the Aleutian Islands.

- North Atlantic Route

Flown by the North Atlantic Wing, direct ferrying route between the Northeast United States and the United Kingdom. Originated at Presque Isle Army Airfield, Maine, routed to ATC bases in Newfoundland to Greenland to Iceland to Prestwick Airport, Scotland.

- South Atlantic Route

Flown by the South Atlantic Division began at Atkinson Field, British Guiana and went through the easternmost point of Brazil and across the South Atlantic Ocean to Roberts Airfield, Liberia. With the opening of an air base on Ascension Island in July 1942, the ocean crossing was divided into two fairly easy stages and ceased to be a serious operational problem The base on Ascension Island was located on British territory

- South Pacific Route

Flown by the Pacific Division, began at Hamilton Field, California and initially to Hickam Field, Hawaii. Pr-war it went via Midway Island and Wake Island and Guam to Clark Field in the Philippines. With the Japanese conquests in the Western Pacific in 1942, the route was changed into be a supply route to Australia, with several routes cries-crossing the Pacific, and eventually returning to the Philippines and after the end of the war to Tokyo where an extension of the India-China Route allowed a complete circumnavigation of the world.
