= Northwest Staging Route =

Air route in Alaska and northern/western Canada during World War II

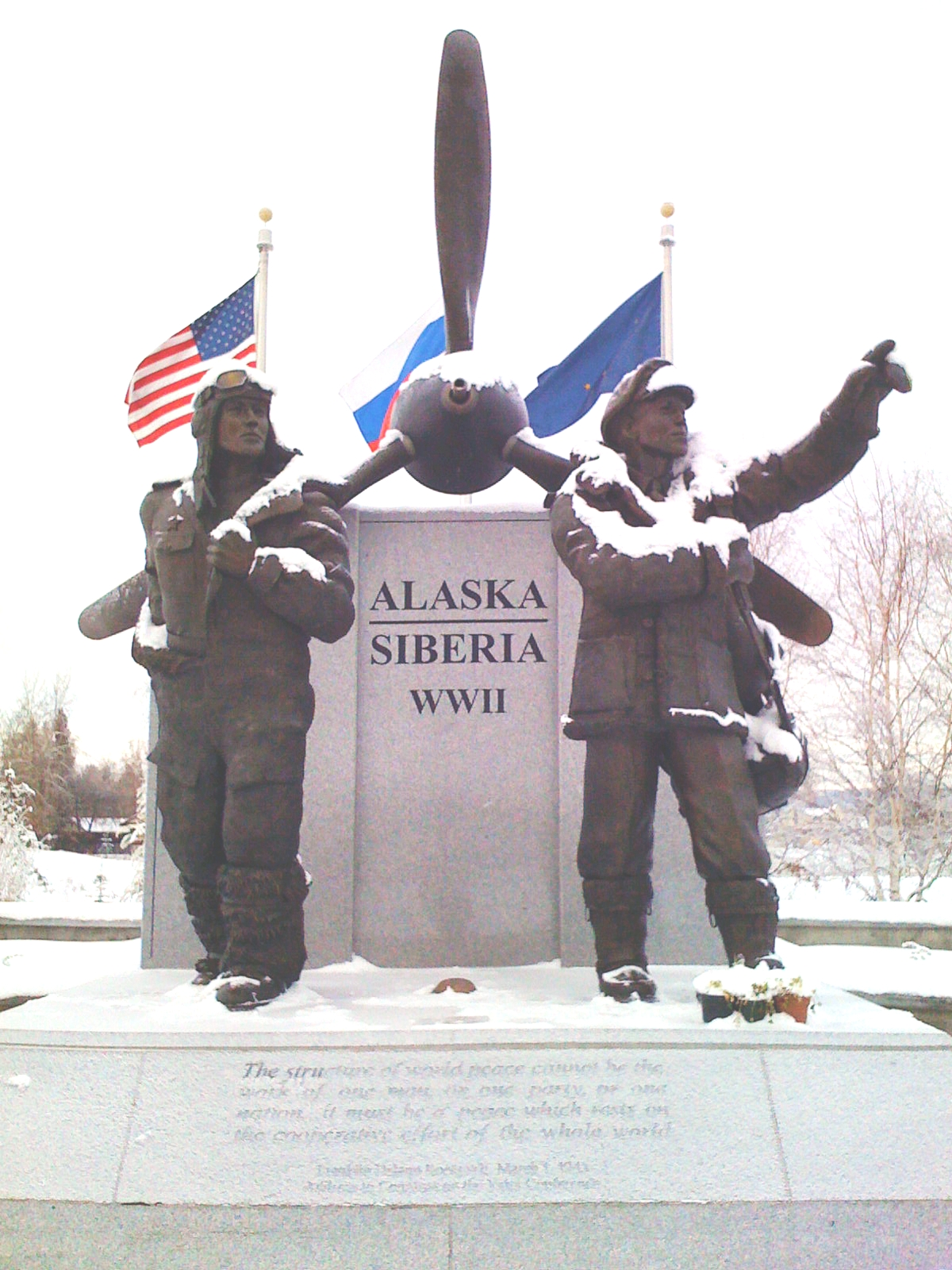
The Lend-Lease Memorial in Fairbanks, Alaska commemorates the shipment of U.S. aircraft to the Soviet Union along the Northwest Staging Route.

The Northwest Staging Route was a series of airstrips, airport and radio ranging stations operating in Alberta, British Columbia, Yukon and Alaska during World War II. It extended into the Soviet Union as the ALSIB (ALaska-SIBerian air road). The Northwest Staging Route carried warplanes to the Soviet Union, at a time when that country was fighting German invaders along the Eastern Front.

== Origins ==
The route was developed in 1942 for several reasons. Initially, the 7th Ferrying Group, Ferrying Command, United States Army Air Corps (later Air Transport Command) at Gore Field (Great Falls Municipal Airport) was ordered to organize and develop an air route to send assistance to the Soviet Union through Northern Canada, across Alaska and the Bering Sea to Siberia, and eventually over to the Eastern Front. The US-Canadian Permanent Joint Board on Defense decided in the autumn of 1940 that a string of airports should be constructed at Canadian expense between the city of Edmonton in central Alberta and the Alaska-Yukon border. Late in 1941 the Canadian government reported that rough landing fields had been completed.

With the outbreak of war, American lines of communication with Alaska by sea were seriously threatened and alternative routes had to be opened. The string of airports through the lonely tundra and forests of northwest Canada provided an air route to Alaska which was practically invulnerable to attack, and it seemed to be in U.S. interests to develop them and open a highway which would at once be a service road for the airports and a means for transporting essential supplies to the Alaskan outposts. In response, the United States Army began building the Alaskan Highway.

Neither the Eleventh Air Force, nor the United States Army, nor the Lend-Lease aid to the Soviet Union could wait for the Alaska Highway to be completed. The long route through the Caribbean to Brazil, Nigeria, Egypt and Iran was unworkable, nor could aircraft be flown via Greenland or Iceland. A huge program of airport construction and road making, therefore, was undertaken.

The Alaska Highway was but a part of the defenses provided for the Northwest North American frontier. Much less is known about the great air route leading from the United States to Alaska through Canada. Airfields were built or upgraded every 100 mi (160 km) or so from Edmonton, Alberta to Fairbanks, Alaska ("the longest hop being the 140 miles or so between Fort Nelson and the Liard River flight strip") The route of the Alaska Highway, which was built to provide a land route to Alaska, basically connected the airfields together. Edmonton became the headquarters of the Alaskan Wing, Air Transport Command.

Two routes were developed from the United States, which met at Edmonton, from which the aircraft were ferried to Ladd Field near Fairbanks where the American-built aircraft were to be turned over to Russian flight crews. Marks Army Airfield, near Nome, Alaska was 500 miles closer to Russia, but was ruled out because the United States feared it was too vulnerable to Japanese attack. One route originated at Great Falls Army Air Base, Montana, where aircraft bound for Russia were ferried from their manufacturing plants in Southern California.

The other route originated at Minneapolis, Minnesota, where Wold-Chamberlain Airport was used as an aircraft staging point for aircraft manufactured in the Midwest and northeastern United States. The Minneapolis-Edmonton route, however was turned into a transport route only by the end of 1943, with aircraft ferrying operations being shifted to Great Falls. In addition to the Lend-Lease aircraft, Alaskan Eleventh Air Force aircraft were also ferried up the NSR, with the aircraft being flown to Elmendorf Field, near Anchorage from RCAF Station Whitehorse upon their arrival.

== Aircraft ==
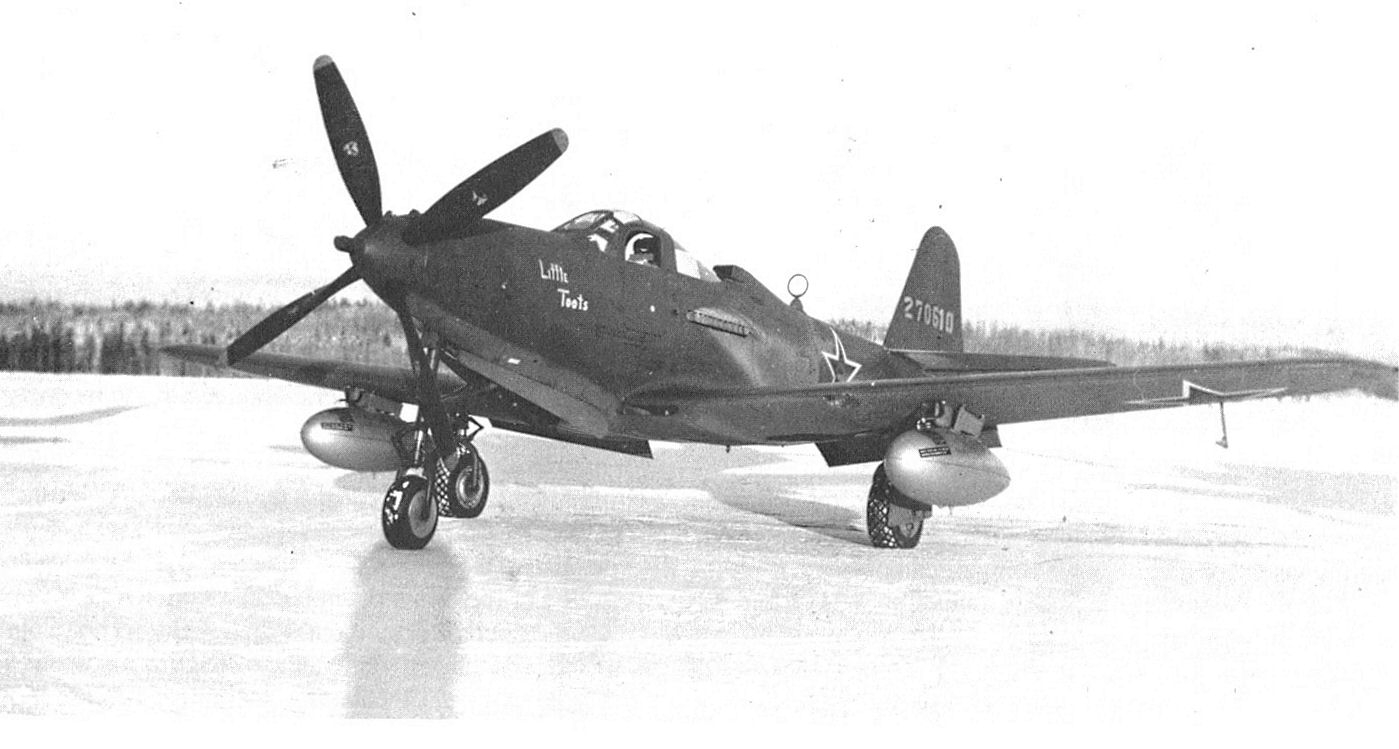
Bell P-63A-10-BE Kingcobra 42-70610 with twin 285-litre drop tanks in Red Air Force markings, 1944 at Ladd Field, Fairbanks Alaska prior to its flight to the Russian front as a Lend-Lease aircraft.

Three main types of combat aircraft were ferried to the Soviet Union under Lend-Lease. Fighter aircraft were Bell P-39 Airacobras, and later its successor, the Bell P-63 Kingcobra, which were favored by the Red Air Force who used the two types with great success. The majority of the P-39s shipped to the Soviet Union were the definitive Q-models. Bombers included the Douglas A-20 Havoc light attack bomber and North American B-25 Mitchell medium bombers that were also sent to the Red Air Force. Transport aircraft were made up of predominantly, the Douglas C-47 Skytrain, also supplied in great numbers.

The Bell fighters and the B-25 Mitchells were flown up to Ladd via Minneapolis; the C-47s and A-20s came up via Great Falls. A handful of other aircraft types, North American AT-6 Texan trainers, some North American Curtiss P-40 Warhawk fighters, three Republic P-47 Thunderbolts and one Curtiss C-46 Commando transport were also ferried to Russia. The aircraft were supplied with Russian language operations and maintenance manuals, as well as painted in Red Air Force camouflage colors and national markings.

The Russians set up a command at Ladd Field and Nome where their pilots were trained to take over the aircraft and fly them to Krasnoyarsk in Siberia and on to various fronts in western Russia. The first group of Russian pilots arrived at Nome on 14 August 1942 on their way to Ladd Field. Along with the pilots were civilians from the Soviet Purchasing Commission and a group of Red Air Force mechanics. Most were located at Ladd, with a secondary group at Marks Field. The first Lend-Lease aircraft, a group of twelve A-20 Havocs, arrived at Ladd on 3 September 1942. The first Russian pilots, after five days of training on the aircraft, took off for Nome and the long trip to the Eastern Front.

Initially the USAAF provided the initial training on how to operate and maintain the Lend-Lease aircraft. Later, after an experienced cadre was developed, the Russians assumed the responsibility. The Russians also meticulously inspected each aircraft, and would reject any aircraft that presented the slightest problem. The USAAF was then left with the chore of correcting them. It was sometimes quite exasperating, as the USAAF would work long hours of overtime to get the aircraft into first-class condition so that all the Russians had to do was fly them from Fairbanks to the Eastern Front.

== Other uses ==
The ALSIB and Northwest Staging Route also provided a diplomatic route between Washington, D.C. and Moscow. Diplomats, high political figures and countless other government officials shuttled back and forth along it in transports during the war. Wendell Willkie, Vice-President Henry A. Wallace, Soviet Foreign Minister Vyacheslav Molotov, and Andrei Gromyko were but a few who used the route. President Roosevelt considered holding a summit in Fairbanks in 1944 to meet with Stalin, however the location was subsequently changed to Yalta in the Soviet Union. Also the route provided a means over which the Russians moved intelligence agents and classified information obtained illegally in the United States. The Soviets, claiming diplomatic immunity, routinely moved large numbers of suitcases in batches of 50 or more, their contents diplomatically sealed.

The Russians who arrived in Alaska also frequently visited shopping areas in Fairbanks and Nome, and contingents visited the aircraft manufacturing plants in the United States. They maintained a strict decorum and politely paid for their purchases, sometimes in old US gold certificates. Many luxury items were bought and shipped back to the Soviet Union on the Lend-Lease aircraft with the hope that they would reach their final destinations in Russia. Most of the Russian pilots were experienced combat veterans who saw the ferrying mission as a respite from their combat missions. They were generally reserved, and political officers were sent to Alaska to ensure their loyalty.

== Termination ==
As the Pacific War wound down, the wartime marriage of convenience between the capitalistic and communist countries was coming to an end. In 1945, the United States and Soviet Union were about to embark on a Cold War and the Soviets departed Fairbanks shortly after the Japanese capitulation in September 1945.

Possibly because of their strict inspection standards, there were remarkably few aircraft accidents. During the 21 months of the program, 7,983 aircraft were delivered to the Soviets with only 133 lost to weather or pilot error. Thirteen Red Air Force pilots were buried in the Fort Richardson cemetery.

== Airfields ==
Primary airfields in BOLD

Name	Location	Coordinates	Notes
Gambell Army Air Field	AK	63°46′04″N 171°43′59″W	Final refueling stop prior to aircraft being flown into Soviet airspace
Marks Field	AK	64°30′44″N 165°26′43″W	Final servicing point for aircraft; 1469th AAFBU ATC Alaskan Division.
Galena Airport	AK	64°44′10″N 156°56′04″W	Refueling/servicing airfield; 1468th AAFBU ATC Alaskan Division.
Ladd Field	AK	64°50′15″N 147°36′51″W	Was main transfer point for Lend-Lease aircraft from United States ATC pilots to Soviet Red Air Force pilots; aircraft then flown to Siberia after transfer.
Mile 26 Field	AK	64°39′55″N 147°06′02″W	Axillary for Ladd AAB
Big Delta Army Air Field	AK	63°59′42″N 145°43′12″W	Refueling/servicing airfield; 1464th AAFBU ATC Alaskan Division.
Tanacross Air Base	AK	63°22′25″N 143°20′00″W	Refueling/servicing airfield; 1464th AAFBU ATC Alaskan Division.
Northway Army Air Field	AK	62°57′40″N 141°55′50″W	Refueling/servicing airfield; 1463d AAFBU ATC Alaskan Division.
Snag	YT	62°21′12″N 140°24′15″W	Abandoned. Emergency landing strip, constructed 1941 by Canadian government
Burwash Landing	YT	61°22′13″N 139°02′22″W	Emergency landing strip, constructed 1941 by Canadian government
Silver City	YT	61°01′49″N 138°24′17″W	Emergency landing strip, constructed 1941 by Canadian government
Aishihik	YT	61°38′56″N 137°29′18″W	Abandoned, Emergency airstrip, constructed 1941 by Canadian government
Pine Lake	YT	60°47′22″N 137°32′33″W	Auxiliary refueling/servicing airfield, constructed 1941 by Canadian government
Champagne	YT	60°47′17″N 136°28′33″W	Emergency landing strip, constructed 1941 by Canadian government
Cousins	YT	60°48′43″N 135°10′57″W	Emergency landing strip
RCAF Station Whitehorse	YT	60°42′45″N 135°04′09″W	Refueling/servicing airfield; 1462d AAFBU ATC Alaskan Division; also known as Whitehorse Army Air Base. Remained as joint RCAF/USAF base until about 1949; hosted Det.3, 1701st Air Transport Wing (MATS)
Squanga Lake	YT	60°29′10″N 133°27′25″W	Emergency landing strip
Teslin Lake	YT	60°10′22″N 132°44′26″W	Emergency landing strip
Pine Lake	YT	60°06′11″N 130°56′00″W	Emergency landing strip (a.k.a. Daughney Aerodrome)
Watson Lake/Liard River	YT	60°06′31″N 128°50′51″W	Refueling/servicing airfield; 1461st AAFBU ATC Alaskan Division.
Smith River	BC	59°53′30″N 126°25′46″W	Emergency landing strip
Fort Nelson	BC	58°50′17″N 122°35′48″W	Was main refueling/servicing point on route; 1460th AAFBU ATC Alaskan Division. Remained as joint RCAF/USAF base until about 1949; hosted Det.2, 1701st Air Transport Wing (MATS)
Prophet River	BC	57°57′47″N 122°47′18″W	Emergency landing strip
Beatton River	BC	57°22′48″N 121°24′41″W	Emergency landing strip
Sikanni Chief	BC	57°05′21″N 122°36′18″W	Emergency landing strip
Fort St. John	BC	56°14′14″N 120°44′24″W	Refueling/servicing airfield; 1459th AAFBU ATC Alaskan Division.
RCAF Station Dawson Creek	BC	55°44′31″N 120°11′06″W	Auxiliary refueling/servicing airfield
Beaverlodge	AB	55°11′04″N 119°26′52″W	Emergency landing strip
Grande Prairie	AB	55°10′55″N 118°52′55″W	Refueling/servicing airfield; 1457th AAFBU ATC Alaskan Division.
DeBolt	AB	55°14′06″N 118°02′19″W	Emergency landing strip
Valleyview	AB	55°01′58″N 117°17′42″W	Emergency landing strip
Fox Creek	AB	54°22′48″N 116°46′00″W	Emergency landing strip
Whitecourt	AB	54°08′37″N 115°47′16″W	Emergency landing strip
Mayerthorpe	AB	53°56′13″N 115°10′41″W	Emergency landing strip
Birch Lake	AB	53°46′16″N 114°33′43″W	Auxiliary airfield; now abandoned and obliterated
RCAF Station Namao	AB	53°40′27″N 113°28′29″W	Opened 1 November 1944. Additional Hub/refueling/servicing airfield in Edmonton. Remained as joint RCAF/USAF base until about 1949; hosted Det.1, 1701st Air Transport Wing (MATS)
RCAF Station Edmonton	AB	53°34′26″N 113°31′30″W	Activated 17 October 1942. Was HQ, Alaskan Wing, ATC; Hub/refueling/servicing airfield; 1450th/1451st/1452d AAFBU.(Repairs performed at Edmonton by Aircraft Repair Ltd., led by Wilfred Leigh Brintnell.)
Great Falls-Edmonton
Ponoka	AB	52°39′07″N 113°36′15″W	Emergency landing strip
Lacombe	AB	52°29′17″N 113°42′42″W	Emergency landing strip
RCAF Station Penhold	AB	52°10′42″N 113°53′21″W	Auxiliary refueling/servicing airfield (now Red Deer Regional Airport)
Innisfail	AB	51°58′42″N 114°00′34″W	Emergency landing strip
Olds	AB	51°42′39″N 114°06′20″W	Auxiliary refueling/servicing airfield
Carstairs	AB	51°34′50″N 114°03′08″W	Emergency landing strip
Airdrie	AB	51°15′52″N 113°56′10″W	Auxiliary refueling/servicing airfield
Calgary	AB	51°07′15″N 114°01′17″W	Refueling/servicing airfield; 1457th AAFBU ATC Alaskan Division.
Okotoks	AB	50°44′06″N 113°56′04″W	Emergency airstrip
High River	AB	50°32′02″N 113°50′36″W	Auxiliary refueling/servicing airfield
Nanton	AB	50°22′19″N 113°39′42″W	2 x 2,000 ft (610 m) runway auxiliary refueling/servicing airfield, now abandoned and obliterated as farmland
RCAF Station Claresholm	AB	50°00′10″N 113°37′38″W	Auxiliary refueling/servicing airfield (now Claresholm Industrial Airport)
RCAF Station Lethbridge	AB	49°37′47″N 112°47′23″W	Auxiliary refueling/servicing airfield (now Lethbridge County Airport)
Shelby	MT	48°32′27″N 111°52′12″W	Auxiliary refueling/servicing airfield
Conrad	MT	48°10′06″N 111°58′33″W	Auxiliary refueling/servicing airfield
Gore Field	MT	47°29′02″N 111°22′21″W	557th AAFBU, Ferrying Division, ATC; Group assembly and dispatch airfield for Lend-lease aircraft (now Great Falls International Airport)
Great Falls Army Air Base	MT	47°30′28″N 111°11′03″W	HQ, Northwest Sector, Domestic Wing, ATC; Group assembly and servicing airfield for Lend-lease aircraft; passenger point of Embarkation (now Malmstrom Air Force Base)
Minneapolis-Edmonton
Vegreville	AB	53°30′45″N 112°01′36″W	Emergency landing airfield
Vermillion	AB	53°21′23″N 110°49′40″W	Emergency landing airfield
Lloydminster	SK	53°17′49″N 110°00′00″W	Emergency landing airfield (closed about 1981 now abandoned, replaced by new airport on Alberta side of border)
RCAF Station North Battleford	SK	52°46′09″N 108°14′40″W	Refueling/servicing airfield (now North Battleford Airport)
RCAF Station Saskatoon	SK	52°10′15″N 106°41′59″W	Refueling/servicing airfield (now Saskatoon John G. Diefenbaker International Airport)
Humboldt	SK	52°10′31″N 105°08′01″W	Emergency landing airfield
Yorkton	SK	51°15′54″N 102°27′42″W	Refueling/servicing airfield
Russell	MB	50°45′55″N 101°17′39″W	Emergency landing airfield
Shoal Lake	MB	50°27′25″N 100°36′34″W	Emergency landing airfield
Minnedosa	MB	50°16′21″N 099°45′50″W	Emergency landing airfield
Neepawa	MB	50°13′56″N 099°30′38″W	Refueling/servicing airfield
RCAF Station Portage la Prairie	MB	49°54′11″N 098°16′26″W	Refueling/servicing airfield (now Portage la Prairie/Southport Airport)
RCAF Station Winnipeg	MB	49°53′20″N 97°14′05″W	Refueling/servicing airfield (now CFB Winnipeg)
Grand Forks	ND	47°55′44″N 097°06′02″W	Refueling/servicing airfield (note: NOT the current Grand Forks International Airport or Grand Forks AFB. This facility was closed after the war, and the land redeveloped)
Fargo	ND	46°55′14″N 096°48′57″W	Refueling/servicing airfield; 575th AAFBU
Alexandria	MN	45°51′56″N 095°23′40″W	Refueling/servicing airfield
St. Cloud	MN	45°32′48″N 094°03′37″W	Refueling/servicing airfield
Wold/Chamberlain Field	MN	44°52′54″N 093°14′01″W	1454th AAFBU, Alaskan Division, ATC (Station 11). Initially group assembly and dispatch airfield for Lend-lease aircraft; after 1943 controlled by Northwest Airlines under contract, coordinated passenger and cargo travelling on Northwest Staging Route. (now Minneapolis-Saint Paul International Airport)

== See also ==
- North Atlantic air ferry route in World War II
- South Atlantic air ferry route in World War II
- South Pacific air ferry route in World War II
- West Coast Wing (Air Transport Command route to Alaska)
- Crimson Route
