= West Coast Wing, Air Transport Command =

West Coast Wing
- Active: 1942–1946
- Country: United States
- Branch: United States Air Force
- Role: Air transport
- Engagements: World War II

The West Coast Wing was the name of two organizations assigned to Air Transport Command during World War II. The first was organized in June 1942 as the 25th AAF Ferrying Wing at Hamilton Field, California. It was redesignated the South Pacific Wing, Air Transport Command in July and the West Coast Wing, Air Transport Command in January 1943. It was inactivated in October 1943.

The second was organized as the 1502nd AAF Base Unit (West Coast Wing) at Hamilton in August 1944. It was replaced by the 1503rd AAF Base Unit (West Coast Wing/1st Air Transport Wing) in December 1945 and was discontinued on 6 September 1946.

== History ==
The ATC West Coast Wing operated a transport route from Gray Army Airfield, Washington to Elmendorf Army Airfield, Alaska Territory during World War II. The route initially operated along the Northwest Pacific Coast providing supplies and equipment to support Eleventh Air Force and United States Army Alaskan Defense Command ground tactical units during the Aleutian Campaign. It later was extended though the Aleutian Islands to Alexai Point Army Airfield on Attu to support long-range bombing operations against the Kurile Islands of Northern Japan.

The wing was initially headquartered at Boeing Field, Washington as part of Ferrying Command, Northwest Sector. Moved to Gray AAF, Washington in late 1942, then to Fairfield-Suisun AAF, California in January 1945.

The route along the Western Pacific coast was closed on 31 December 1945; transport to Alaska being switched to the former Northwest Staging Route. The introduction of long-distance transports after the war made most intermediate stops redundant and the wing was inactivated in 1946, responsibility for transport to Alaska being taken over by the ATC Pacific Division.

=== Stations ===
Name	Location	Coordinates	Notes
Gray Army Airfield	WA	47°04′45″N 122°34′50″W	4131st Army Air Force Base Unit. Connecting hub from the Continental United States for personnel, material and equipment bound for Eleventh Air Force. Jurisdiction transferred to Department of the Army in 1947, now part of Fort Lewis.
Annette Island Army Airfield	AK	55°02′13″N 131°34′21″W	Annette Island Landing Field opened in August 1940. Was used by ATC as an intermediate stop on coastal route to Elmendorf Field. Used as servicing/refueling airfield, also as a coastal patrol base and station for air rescue units. Active duty units inactivated at the airfield in January 1946, was used by MATS (later MAC) Air Rescue Service (ARS) and Air Weather Service (AWS) throughout the Cold War. Still in occasional use by Alaskan Command. Now Annette Island Airport (IATA: ANN, ICAO: PANT, FAA LID: ANN).
Yakutat Army Airfield	AK	59°30′31″N 139°39′35″W	Yakutat Landing Field opened in October 1940. Was used by ATC as an intermediate stop on coastal route to Elmendorf Field. Used as servicing/refueling airfield. Closed December 1945. Now Yakutat Airport (IATA: YAK, ICAO: PAYA, FAA LID: YAK).
Elmendorf Field	AK	61°15′00″N 149°48′00″W	Primary station for ATC in Alaska. Operated large aerial port with passenger and cargo/equipment facilities. Servicing facility operated by Technical Service Command with large warehouses of supplies and equipment for use by Eleventh Air Force during Aleutian Campaign. Was hub for ferrying and transport operations to Ladd Field near Fairbanks and RCAF Station Whitehorse for logistical support of Northwest Staging Route. After the war ended has remained in use by MATS/MAC and current Air Mobility Command as stop on Great Circle Route to Japan and to the Continental United States.
Naknek Army Airfield	AK	58°40′36″N 156°38′57″W	Activated 1 July 1942. Was transport and maintenance airfield for ATC aircraft servicing Alaska airfields; also provided maintenance for transient aircraft in Alaska. Transferred to Eleventh Air Force, then to Alaskan Air Command in 1945. Became King Salmon Airport (IATA: AKN, ICAO: PAKN, FAA LID: AKN) and used during the Cold War as Air Defense interceptor base. Now in reserve status, military components of airport maintained by contractors.
Fort Morrow Army Airfield	AK	56°57′24″N 158°38′18″W	On Kodiak Island, Opened December 1941. Built in secret for defense of Alaskan Territory. Used by ATC as an intermediate stop on Aleutian Route to/from Shemya Army Airfield. Closed October 1946, now Port Heiden Airport (IATA: PTH, ICAO: PAPH, FAA LID: PTH).
Fort Randall Army Airfield	AK	55°11′56″N 162°43′15″W	Also known as Cold Bay. Opened February 1941. Used by ATC as an intermediate stop on Aleutian Route to/from Shemya Army Airfield. After the end of the Aleutian Campaign was used by Air Rescue Service (ARS) as search and rescue airfield. Later renamed Thornbrough Air Force Base, Closed 1953. Now Cold Bay Airport (IATA: CDB, ICAO: PACD, FAA LID: CDB).
Fort Glenn Army Airfield	AK	53°22′39″N 167°53′31″W	On Umnak Island. Opened 1 May 1942 by Eleventh Air Force as a combat airfield for the defense of Alaska. Used by ATC as an intermediate stop on Aleutian Route for transport of supplies and equipment during Aleutian Campaign. Became Cape Air Force Base, 1947, Closed December 1950. Today on U.S. National Register of Historic Places. declared a National Historic Landmark in 1987.
Davis Army Airfield	AK	51°52′40″N 176°38′33″W	On Adak Island, opened September 1942 as a combat airfield for the defense of Alaska. Was HQ, Eleventh Air Force during World War II. Used by ATC as an intermediate stop on Aleutian Route for transport of supplies and equipment during Aleutian Campaign. Later became Davis Air Force Base; Transferred to Department of the Navy, 1949 as Naval Air Station Adak, Closed after the Cold War in March 1997. Now Adak Airport (IATA: ADK, ICAO: PADK, FAA LID: ADK).
Amchitka Army Airfield	AK	51°22′37″N 179°15′23″E	On Amchitka Island, opened in February 1943 as a combat airfield for attacks on Japanese-held territory in the Aleutian Islands. Used for resupply and casualty evacuation operations by ATC during Aleutian Campaign. Became Amchitka Air Force Base in 1947, closed 1948. Now abandoned.
Shemya Army Airfield	AK	52°42′44″N 174°06′43″E	Opened May 1943 on Shemya Island. Terminus of ATC operations on Aleutian Route from Elmendorf Field near Anchorage. Supported Eleventh Air Force combat operations against Northern Japan. Later became intermediate stop on Great Circle route to/From Japan as a servicing/refueling airfield. Operations continued throughout Cold War, used by MATS/MAC/AMC for support of Shemya AFB (later Eareckson AFS). Inactivated as active Air Force station July 1994, occasionally still used by AMC for support of contractor operations ongoing at base.
Alexai Point Army Airfield	AK	52°48′51″N 173°17′51″E	Opened June 1943 on Attu Island as Eleventh Air Force combat airfield during Aleutian Campaign. Later used for very-long range bombardment operations of Northern Japanese Kuril Islands. Closed September 1945, now abandoned.

== Lineage ==
Constituted as the 25th AAF Ferrying Wing
Activated on 23 June 1942
Redesignated South Pacific Wing, Air Transport Command on 5 July 1942
Redesignated West Coast Wing, Air Transport Command on 1 January 1943
Inactivated on 31 October 1943

Designated as the 1502nd AAF Base Unit (Headquarters, West Coast Wing, Air Transport Command) and organized on 1 August 1944
Discontinued on 4 December 1945

Designated as the 1503rd AAF Base Unit (Port of Aerial Embarkation) and organized on 1 August 1944
Redescribed as 1503rd AAF Base Unit (Headquarters, West Coast Wing, Air Transport Command/1st Air Trasnport Wing) on 4 December 1945
Discontinued on 6 September 1946

=== Assignments ===
- AAF Ferrying Command (later Air Transport Command), 23 June 1942 – 31 October 1943
- Pacific Division, Air Transport Command, 1 August 1944 – 4 December 1945
- Pacific Division, Air Transport Command, 1 August 1944 – 6 September 1946

=== Stations ===
- Hamilton Field, California 23 June 1942 – 31 October 1943
- Hamilton Field, California 1 August 1944 – 6 September 1946

=== Components ===
- 11th Ferrying Group, 28 July 1942 – August 1943
- 1504th AAF Base Unit (Port of Aerial Embarkation), 1 August 1944 – 6 September 1946

Fairfield-Suisun Army Air Field, California

- 1505th AAF Base Unit (Port of Aerial Embarkation), 1 August 1944 – 29 December 1945

Mather Field, California

- 1506th AAF Base Unit, 1 August 1944 – 21 February 1945

McClellan Field, California

- 1507th AAF Base Unit, 1 August 1944 – 9 September 1944

Chico Army Air Field, California

- 1508th AAF Base Unit (Foreign Transport Station), 1 August 1944 – 20 March 1946

Mills Field, California

- 1509th AAF Base Unit (Foreign Transport Station), 1 August 1944 – 3 February 1945

Long Beach Army Air Base, California

- 1510th AAF Base Unit, 1 August 1944 – 31 August 1944

Lindbergh Field, California

== See also ==
- North Atlantic air ferry route in World War II
- South Atlantic air ferry route in World War II
- South Pacific air ferry route in World War II
- Crimson Route
