= North Atlantic air ferry route in World War II =

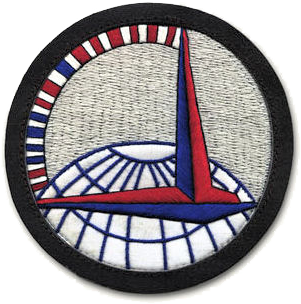
Air Transport Command emblem

The North Atlantic air ferry route was a series of Air Routes over the North Atlantic Ocean on which aircraft were ferried from the United States and Canada to Great Britain during World War II to support combat operations in the European Theatre of Operations (ETO).

The route was developed as one of four major routes along which American and Canadian-built aircraft were ferried to the major combat areas. It originated at several Army Air Bases in New England, which permitted short range single-engined aircraft to be flown to Britain using a series of intermediate airfields in Newfoundland, Labrador, Greenland and Iceland. Long-range multi-engined aircraft could be flown from Newfoundland directly using Great Circle routes to airfields in Ireland and southwest England; or via the Azores to the UK or airfields in French Morocco to support Allied air forces in the Mediterranean Theatre of Operations (MTO). Later in the war, air routes over the North Atlantic were developed from South Florida via Bermuda to the Azores.

== Origins ==
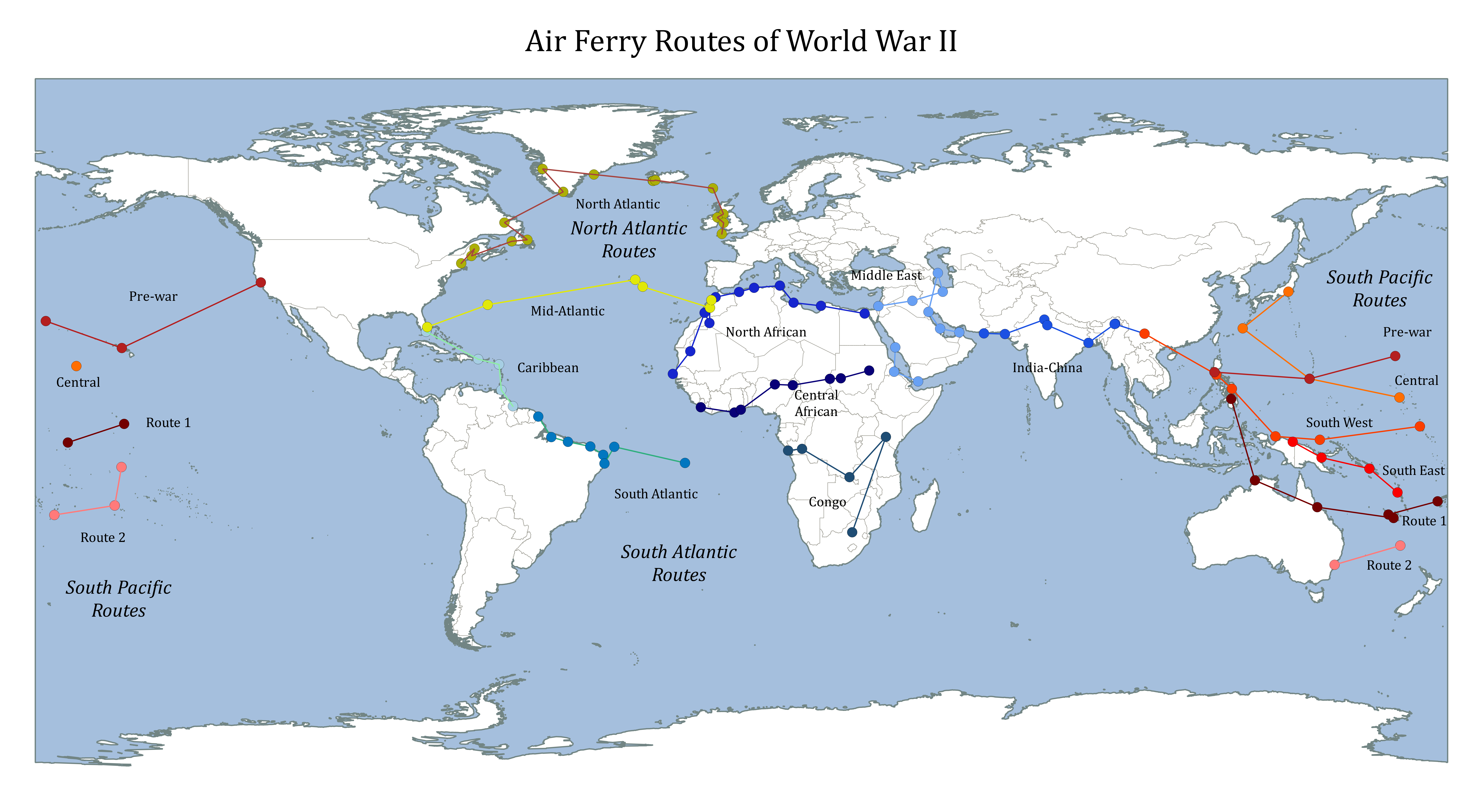
The Air Ferry Routes of WWII, including North Atlantic Route, South Atlantic Route and South Pacific Route

Although many air route surveys of the North Atlantic had been made in the 1930s, by the outbreak of World War II in Europe, civilian trans-Atlantic air service was just becoming a reality. It was soon suspended in favor of military activities. The increasing need for Britain and France to obtain military aircraft in the United States revived interest in intermediate airfields along the "stepping stone" of the North Atlantic. Although airports existed in Newfoundland, and Britain built an airfield in Reykjavik, Iceland (1940), the only practical way to get short-range aircraft to Europe was by cargo ship.

With the Fall of France in June 1940, and the loss of much war materiel on the continent, the need for the British to purchase replacement materiel from the United States was urgent. Aircraft ordered by France and also by the Netherlands were impounded. The aircraft purchased in the United States by Britain were flown to airports in Nova Scotia and Newfoundland, partially dis-assembled and loaded on ships and transported to England where they were unloaded and re-assembled, a process that could take several weeks, not counting repairing any damage to the aircraft incurred in the shipment. In addition, German U-boats operating in the North Atlantic Ocean were a constant menace to shipping routes in the North Atlantic making it very hazardous for merchant shipping between Newfoundland and Great Britain. Larger aircraft could be flown to the UK and the Atlantic Ferry Organization was set up to manage this using civilian pilots.

On 2 September 1940, the Destroyers for Bases Agreement was completed. In exchange for fifty obsolete destroyers, the U. S. got ninety-nine-year leases for air and naval bases in the Dominion of Newfoundland, Bermuda, British Guiana, Antigua, Trinidad, St. Lucia, Jamaica and the Bahamas. (Technically, not all bases were exchanged; some were "gifted.")

Although Iceland was viewed as a part of Europe, Greenland was considered a part of North America and subject to the Monroe Doctrine. President Roosevelt vetoed Canadian and British plans for the occupation of the island. In 1940, Greenland was subject to a U.S. protectorate enforced by the U.S. Coast Guard, and a survey for airfields was made. On 9 April 1941, the United States signed a treaty with the defected Danish Ambassador in Washington, allowing for unlimited U.S. military use of the island. The agreement, after explicitly recognizing Danish sovereignty over Greenland, granted to the United States the right to locate and construct aircraft landing fields and other facilities for the defense of Greenland and for the defense of the North American continent. President Roosevelt then authorized the War Department to build airfields and other facilities in Greenland. The United States had also taken over the defense of Iceland under an agreement with Britain in July 1941, relieving the British Empire troops then in Iceland. United States Army engineers began improving the airstrips previously begun by the British.

Using these new airfields in Newfoundland, Greenland and Iceland, land based air routes were developed to transport United States aircraft, soldiers and war supplies between the United States and the United Kingdom.

=== North Atlantic Route ===
Under the Destroyers for Bases Agreement, the first United States troops arrived in Newfoundland on 29 January 1941. The first USAAF presence in Newfoundland came in May 1941 when six Douglas B-18 Bolos from the First Air Force 21st Reconnaissance Squadron arrived at RCAF Station Gander. Attached to the 21st Recon was Captain Elliott Roosevelt, the son of the president. He made the 1941 surveys that resulted in construction of airports at Goose Bay, Fort Chimo, Frobisher Bay, and Padloping Island. Captain Roosevelt also surveyed Iceland and Greenland and reported to his superiors on the air route development during the Atlantic Conference in August 1941. In September 1941 Canada began the development of Goose Bay in Labrador. The other stations followed in October, but they were built by the United States.

In July 1941, the United States sent construction crews to Narsarsuaq in Greenland to build the air base that came to be known as Bluie West 1 (BW-1), later the headquarters of Greenland Base Command. The following October, work began on Bluie West 8, a much more northerly base at Sondrestrom on the western coast of Greenland. Next year, on the east coast, an airfield was built 50 kilometres northeast of Angmagssalik (Bluie East 2). This air route was known as the North Atlantic Route, and became one of the major transport and supply routes of World War II.

The North Atlantic Route was initially operated by the 23d Army Air Forces Ferrying Wing, Army Air Forces Ferrying Command, initially headquartered at Presque Isle Army Air Field, Maine. Ferrying Command was re-designated Air Transport Command on 1 July 1942. The 23d Ferrying Wing was replaced by the ATC North Atlantic Division, Grenier Army Air Base, New Hampshire on 1 January 1944. The Royal Air Force counterpart organization was RAF Ferry Command (before mid-1941 known as RAF Atlantic Ferry Service and after March 1943 No. 45 (North Atlantic) Group within RAF Transport Command).

The route was inaugurated in the spring of 1942, with large movements of aircraft taking place during the summer. Many serious problems were encountered, and the total loss rate on the route approached 10%. On 22 November Air Transport Command suspended the transportation of passengers across the North Atlantic for the duration of the winter. ATC traffic to Great Britain was diverted to the South Atlantic air ferry route in World War II. The distance to Britain by this route was significantly longer, but operations could be maintained on a year-round basis.

=== Mid-Atlantic Route ===
Efforts on another front were also productive. Prior to 1943 the Portuguese government only allowed German U-boats and navy ships to refuel in the Azores. However, diplomatic efforts in 1943 based on the 570 year old Treaty of Windsor of 1373 helped persuade Portuguese Prime Minister António de Oliveira Salazar to lease bases on Azores Islands to the British. The agreement was signed on 17 August 1943 and represented a key turning point in the Battle of the Atlantic allowing the Allies to provide aerial coverage in the middle of the Atlantic.

The British established RAF Lagens Field at an existing packed earth runway on Terceira Island and given the use of an additional airfield on Sao Miguel Island. On 1 December 1943, British and United States military representatives at RAF Lagens Field signed a joint agreement outlining the roles and responsibilities for the USAAF and United States Navy use of RAF Lagens Field. In return, the US agreed to assist the British in improving and extending existing facilities at Lagens. Air Transport Command transport planes began landing at Lagens Field immediately after the agreement was signed. Prime Minister Salazar gave his consent to the arrangement with the understanding the Americans would be under British control. By the end of June 1944, more than 1,900 American airplanes had passed through these two airfields in the Azores. The Lagens Field name was used by both the British and Americans until it was changed to Lajes Field in 1953.

The air routes established allowed long range multi-engined aircraft fitted with auxiliary fuel tanks to be ferried from Morrison Field, in South Florida through Kindley Field, Bermuda to one of the two airfields in the Azores, then on to RAF St Mawgan in Cornwall throughout the year. Single-engine aircraft, however, had to be ferried on the North Atlantic Route due to their shorter ranges. Also aircraft were ferried from Newfoundland via the Azores to Cornwall. This route was subsequently designated as the Mid-Atlantic Route. In addition, ATC ferried aircraft to French Morocco to support forces in the Mediterranean Theater of Operations (MTO) from the Azores.

=== Crimson Route ===
The Crimson Route was a planned Great Circle route to ferry aircraft from manufacturing plants in Southern California and Seattle via Montana over Canada to Greenland using Arctic air routes. This route had the advantage of avoiding the poor weather over the North Atlantic by flying over the high latitudes of northern Canada to Greenland, then across Greenland to Iceland and on to Great Britain. Aircraft manufactured in the Midwest and Eastern United States could be flown north over Ontario or Quebec to Greenland as well, avoiding the often stormy North Atlantic. Several airfields were developed in northern Canada, and the route was tested by some RAF aircraft, however the project was ended in 1943 by the development of the Mid-Atlantic Route from Florida to the Azores and never fully developed.

== Airfields ==
=== North Atlantic Route ===
Name	Location	Coordinates	Notes
Grenier Army Air Base	New Hampshire	42°55′57″N 071°26′08″W	Initially First Air Force base, jurisdiction assumed by Air Transport Command on 1 January 1944. Grenier became the headquarters of the North Atlantic Division of Air Transport Command (ATC), its primary mission was the ferrying of aircraft from the United States to Great Britain. Operated by 1377th AAFBU, ATC. Approximately 300–400 aircraft transited the airfield each month over North Atlantic Route. Placed on standby status on 30 October 1946.
Presque Isle Air Force Base	Maine	46°41′20″N 68°02′41″W	Presque Isle Airport taken over by the Army Air Corps on 15 September 1941. 23d Ferrying Wing AAC Ferrying Command headquarters was established, later 1380th AAFBU, North Atlantic Division, ATC. June 1942 became HO ATC, North Atlantic Wing. The mission of the wing was to facilitate the transfer of Lend-Lease aircraft to England and act as an embarkation point for movement of Army Air Corps personnel and equipment. From Presque Isle, most ferried aircraft were flown to RCAF Station Gander, Newfoundland, then switching to Goose Bay, Labrador in mid-1942. The airport remained Corporate HQ of Northeast Airlines, and was operated as a Civil/Military airfield throughout the war. Presque Isle remained the primary point of departure on the North Atlantic Route throughout the war. Returned to civil control September 1945.
Dow Army Airfield	Maine	44°48′51″N 068°49′51″W	Commercial airport taken over by USAAC in September 1941. Assigned to Air Service Command. Its initial mission was the maintenance and preparation of Lend-Lease aircraft bound for Great Britain, being transported by AAC Ferrying Command to RCAF Stations in Newfoundland. After American entry into World War II, performed any necessary servicing on aircraft transiting over North Atlantic route. In addition, beginning in early 1943, it acquired the additional mission of training engineer aviation personnel and staging hundreds of 4-engined heavy bombers and preparing them for the overseas flight to European and Mediterranean combat theaters. Jurisdiction transferred to Air Transport Command March 1944. Controlled by 1379th AAFBU, North Atlantic Division, ATC. Over 8,400 aircraft passed through Dow in 1944, and approximately 2,150 in the last five months of the European conflict in 1945. After the end of the European war in May 1945, Dow was a stop on the return leg for aircraft returning to the United States, and remained part of ATC's North Atlantic Transport route for strategic air transportation between the United States and the United Kingdom. Placed on standby status May 1946.
Stephenville Air Base	Newfoundland	48°32′38″N 058°33′12″W	460 miles (740 km) from Presque Isle. Developed by the United States and Newfoundland as a ferrying staging field in mid-1941 as a result of the 1940 Destroyers for Bases Agreement under Newfoundland Base Command. Specifically developed with long runways to accommodate large multi-engined aircraft capable of Trans-Atlantic crossings when equipped with internal auxiliary fuel tanks. Used by Air Transport Command for direct flights to RAF St Mawgan in Cornwall, an air distance of 2,357 miles (3,793 km). Was capable by use of the largest United States aircraft and was the largest military airfield located outside of the Continental United States when constructed. The base became a frequent stopping and refueling point for USAAF aircraft crossing the Atlantic in both directions. Remained active after the war, renamed Ernest Harmon Air Force Base in 1948. Turned over to Canadian national government in 1966 with expiration of United States agreement with Canada for use of military bases.
RCAF Station Gander	Newfoundland	48°56′13″N 054°34′05″W	643 miles (1,035 km) from Presque Isle. Established as civil airport, turned over to RCAF in 1940. Became part of Newfoundland Base Command. Heavily used by Ferrying Command and ATC for transporting military aircraft from Canada and the United States to the European Theater of Operations (ETO) via Greenland and Iceland airfields.
RCAF Station Goose Bay	Labrador	53°19′09″N 060°25′33″W	569 miles (916 km) from Presque Isle. Established in 1941 by RCAF, became joint airfield with United States AAF and Royal Air Force. Became part of Newfoundland Base Command. In 1943, RCAF Station Goose Bay was the busiest airport in the world transiting aircraft being ferried to Greenland by ATC.
Bluie West 1	Greenland	61°10′00″N 045°25′59″W	776 miles (1,249 km) from Goose Bay. Established in 1941 by United States Army, operational in 1942. HQ Greenland Base Command. Primary refueling/servicing stop in Greenland for North Atlantic Route. Remained under United States Air Force control until 1958. Now a civilian airport.
Bluie West 8	Greenland	67°00′38″N 050°42′33″W	1,000 miles (1,600 km) from Goose Bay. Established in 1941 by United States Army; operational in 1942. Alternate refueling/servicing stop in Greenland for North Atlantic Route, also planned for use on Crimson Route over Canada. Used when weather in southern Greenland prohibited ferrying over direct route to Iceland. Remained under United States Air Force control until end of Cold War. Became Greenland's main airport after the war.
Bluie East 2	Greenland	65°56′29.4″N 36°40′30.36″W	375 miles (604 km) from BW-8. Established in 1942 by United States Army; evacuated in 1947 and now abandoned. In limited use as a refueling/servicing stop; also planned for use on Crimson Route over Canada.
Meeks Field	Iceland	63°59′03″N 22°36′24″W	748 miles (1,204 km) from BW-1, 455 miles (732 km) from BE-2. Built in 1941, headquarters of Iceland Base Command. Long runway used for ferrying of multi-engined aircraft. 1386th AAFBU, North Atlantic Division, ATC. Became NATO interceptor base during the Cold War as Keflavik Airport. Turned over to Iceland Government 2006.
Patterson Field	Iceland	63°57′31″N 22°32′58″W	Originally Svidningar field, used by Iceland Base Command as a fighter base for air defense, however also used by ATC as an overflow base for ferrying single-engine aircraft due to its short runways. USAAF air activity ended at the airfield in March 1947.
RAF Reykjavik	Iceland	64°07′48″N 021°56′26″W	Built in October 1940 at Reykjavík Airport by the British Army for the RAF. Used as a civil/military airfield during the war, also used by ATC as an overflow base. Turned over to Icelandic government in July 1946 and since then it has been operated by the Icelandic Civil Aviation Authority (now named Flugstoðir Airport).
RAF Vágar	Faroe Islands	62°03′49″N 007°16′38″W	491 miles (790 km) from Iceland. Used as refueling/servicing/emergency landing base. Built by British Royal Monmouthshire Royal Engineers in 1942 after the pre-emptive occupation by British forces of the Danish Faroe Islands in 1940 following the occupation of Denmark by Nazi Germany. Control of the islands reverted to Denmark following the war.
Prestwick Airport	Scotland	55°30′34″N 004°35′40″W	467 miles (752 km) from RAF Vágar, 852 miles (1,371 km) from Iceland. Initial ATC base in United Kingdom for receiving ferried aircraft from the United States. 1403d AAFBU. Began operations in July 1941 as Eastern Terminus, Atlantic Division, Ferrying Command. Jan 1943 became HQ Air Transport Command, Eastern European Wing. Remained as primary terminus of North Atlantic route throughout the war. Under United States control until 31 May 1945.
RAF Nutts Corner	Northern Ireland, UK	54°37′45″N 06°09′00″W	519 miles (835 km) from RAF Vágar, 863 miles (1,389 km) from Iceland. Opened in 1941, ATC base established in June 1943, 1404th AAFBU, European Division. Detachment also at RAF Langford Lodge, Northern Ireland. Langford Lodge also was used as a servicing facility (403d Air Depot). Closed 30 June 1945.
RAF Valley	Wales, UK	53°14′53″N 04°32′07″W	621 miles (999 km) from RAF Vágar, 979 miles (1,576 km) from Iceland. An established RAF Station, it was brought into use in April 1943 as an ATC base, 1407th AAFBU, European Division. Was the closest ATC controlled airfield to most of the USAAF Eighth and Ninth Air Force stations located in the East Anglia region of eastern England. Sixty to seventy aircraft arrived each day, then forwarded to operational bases. Returned to sole RAF use in September 1945. During the 1950s, MATS operated WB-50 Superfortress weather aircraft (28th Weather Squadron) from the base.
RAF St Mawgan	Cornwall, England	50°26′16″N 05°00′21″W	Pre-war civil airport taken over by RAF initially as a satellite of nearby RAF St Eval. Rebuilt in new location with longer wider runways. Turned over to Air Transport Command, 1 June 1943 for long-distance transports arriving from Stephenville Air Base, Newfoundland and aircraft being ferried to England from the Azores. Operated by 1406th AAFBU, ATC European Division. Served as hub for North African Division, ATC flights from French Morocco, along with ferried aircraft over the South Atlantic Route by ATC South Atlantic Division originating in South Florida. Was also terminal for ferrying of aircraft to Twelfth Air Force in French West Africa and Tunisia from United Kingdom, along with transport of supplies and materiel. From 1943 it was also used by RAF Ferry Command and BOAC. RAF control from February 1946.

=== Mid-Atlantic Route ===
Name	Location	Coordinates	Notes
Morrison Field	Florida	26°41′05″N 080°05′21″W	Initially a Third Air Force Base, reassigned to Army Air Forces Ferrying Command (later Air Transport Command) on 19 January 1942, and for the balance of the war became Headquarters for the Caribbean Wing of ATC. Operated by 1103d AAFBU, ATC. Primary mission was to operate the South Atlantic Transport Route, although when Azores bases became available in the summer of 1943, also handled ferrying of long-range aircraft via Bermuda to United Kingdom. Also operated intermediate emergency refueling/servicing airfield at Grand Bahama Airport (Detachment, 1103d AAFBU), Freeport. Aircraft likely ferried over Mid-Atlantic Route from Homestead AAF (1104th AAFBU) and Miami Army Airfield 1105th AAFBU. Placed in reserve status on 1 July 1947.
Kindley Field	Bermuda	32°21′58″N 064°41′16″W	1,005 miles (1,617 km) from Morrison Field. Built by United States after basing rights obtained via Destroyers For Bases Agreement. Part of Bermuda Base Command, Ferrying operations began 1943 with opening of Mid-Atlantic route. 1389th AAFBU, North Atlantic Division, ATC. Performed servicing/refueling en route to Azores. Remained active after World War II, became Kindley Air Force Base in 1948.
RAF Lagens Field Lajes Field Lajes Air Base	Terceira Island, Azores	38°45′42″N 027°05′17″W	2,145 miles (3,452 km) from Bermuda, 1,698 miles (2,733 km) from Newfoundland, 1,346 miles (2,166 km) from RAF St Mawgan. Usage rights obtained in December 1943 from British, former civil airport. Operated by 1390th AAFBU, North Atlantic Division, ATC, used as servicing/refueling airfield between bases in Bermuda, Great Britain and French Morocco. Air Transport Command traffic increased from approximately 90 planes in January 1944 to more than 600 planes in June 1944. By the end of June 1944 more than 1,900 American aircraft had passed through the base. In order for aircraft to operate on schedule, a 45-minute period was the average time limit allowed to service the aircraft after landing United States granted military rights, September 1946, remained active as Lajes Field, active today as joint Portuguese Air Force/USAF/Civil Airport.
Santa Maria Airport (Azores)	Santa Maria Island, Azores	36°58′28″N 025°10′10″W	Built by United States, early 1944. Operated by 1391st AAFBU, North Atlantic Division, ATC. Used as overflow airfield for RAF Lagans. Later became Azores Air Transfer Station. Turned over to Portuguese Government, 1 September 1946, now civil airport.
Menara Airport	Marrakech, French Morocco	31°36′25″N 008°02′11″W	Seized from Vichy French control as part of Operation Torch, November 1942. Became ATC base, operated by 1257th AAFBU, North African Division, ATC. Received ferried aircraft on South Atlantic route primarily from Roberts Field, Liberia, supporting Twelfth Air Force. Air route to Azores 1,182 miles (1,902 km) established in January 1944.
Anfa Airport	Casablanca, French Morocco	33°33′25″N 007°39′38″W	Seized from Vichy French control as part of Operation Torch, November 1942. Became ATC base, operated by 1251st AAFBU, North African Division, ATC. Received ferried aircraft on South Atlantic route primarily from Roberts Field, Liberia, supporting Twelfth Air Force. Air route to Azores 1,140 miles (1,830 km) established in January 1944.

== See also ==
- South Atlantic air ferry route in World War II
- South Pacific air ferry route in World War II
- Northwest Staging Route
- West Coast Wing (Air Transport Command route to Alaska)
- Crimson Route
