= RCAF Station Whitehorse =

Location
- Coordinates: 60°42′34″N 135°04′02″W

Site history
- Built: 1942
- In use: 1942-1968

Location of RCAF Station Whitehorse, Yukon

RCAF Station Whitehorse was originally opened by the Canadian Department of Transport as "Whitehorse airfield". It is located at what is now the Erik Nielsen Whitehorse International Airport in Whitehorse, Yukon.

The airport was transferred to the Royal Canadian Air Force in 1942 as part of the system called the Northwest Staging Route. Designated as RCAF Station Whitehorse, it had detachments at Teslin, Aishihik, and Snag, Yukon and in 1946, at Watson Lake, Yukon.

After World War II, RCAF Station Whitehorse continued to function primarily as a refueling point on the Alaska route. The Department of Transport took over the operation of the airport, but the RCAF remained. In 1948, the station at Prince Rupert, British Columbia closed and the intercept positions were moved to Whitehorse.

The station's function changed to primarily a Radio Unit, namely, No. 5 Radio Unit. It became part of the Canadian Forces Supplementary Radio System in 1966 and was renamed Canadian Forces Station Whitehorse with the transfer to the Supplementary Radio System (SUPRAD). RCAF operations were limited to radio intercept. It was a short lived operation as CFS Whitehorse closed in 1968.
