= Alaska World War II Army airfields =

History of military facilities in U.S. state of Alaska

Alaska World War II Army Airfields
- Part of World War II

Site information
- Type: Army Airfields
- Controlled by: United States Army Air Forces

Site history
- Built: 1942–1944
- In use: 1942-Present

Garrison information
- Garrison: Eleventh Air Force

During World War II, Alaska was a major United States Army Air Forces (USAAF) location for personnel, aircraft, and airfields to support Lend-Lease aid for the Soviet Union. In addition, it was in Alaska that the Empire of Japan bombed and seized United States soil and as a result the USAAF was actively engaged in combat operations against them.

== Airfields ==
=== Combat airfields ===
- Adak Army Airfield, 51°52′40″N 176°38′33″W

Adak Island, Aleutian Islands, 1942-1945
Transferred to Alaskan Air Command; Became Davis Air Force Base (1947); Transferred to Department of the Navy, 1950 as Naval Air Station Adak

- Amchitka Army Airfield, 51°22′37″N 179°15′23″E

Amchitka Island, Aleutian Islands, 1943-1945
Transferred to Alaskan Air Command; Became Amchitka Air Force Base; Closed 1948, now abandoned

- Alexai Point Army Airfield, 52°48′51″N 173°17′51″E

Attu Island, Aleutian Islands, 1943-1945, Closed 1945, now abandoned.

- Casco Cove Army Airfield, 52°49′52″N 173°10′29″E

Attu Island, Aleutian Islands, 1943-1945
Transferred to Alaskan Air Command, Inactivated 1945; Transferred to United States Coast Guard, 1949 as Casco Cove Coast Guard Station Also known as LORAN Station Attu, the facility was closed on August 27, 2010,[3] but the airfield remains available for emergency use.[1]

- Elmendorf Field, 61°15′00″N 149°48′00″W

Anchorage, Alaska Territory, 1940-1945
Transferred to Alaskan Air Command, Became Elmendorf Air Force Base.The adjacent facilities were officially combined by the 2005 Base Closure and Realignment Commission and subsequently became known as Joint Base Elmendorf - Richardson (JBER). Its mission is to support and defend U.S. interests in the Asia Pacific region and around the world by providing units who are ready for worldwide air power projection and a base that is capable of meeting PACOM's theater staging and throughput requirements.[3] It is the home of the Headquarters, Alaskan Command (ALCOM), Alaskan NORAD Region (ANR), Joint Task Force-Alaska (JTF-AK), Eleventh Air Force (11 AF), the 673d Air Base Wing, the 3rd Wing, the Alaska Air National Guard's 176th Wing; 176th Wing (AK ANG) moved from the former Kulis Air National Guard Base to JBER in 2011.[10] Its new facilities, an area north of the flightline, were unofficially but widely nicknamed 'Camp Kulis'. The area includes a headquarters building, Pararescue facility, the Rescue Coordination Center, and several other installations used by the 176th Wing; and other Tenant Units.[4]

- Fort Glenn Army Airfield, 53°22′39″N 167°53′31″W

Umnak Island, Aleutian Islands, 1942-1947, Closed 1947, now abandoned.

- Fort Morrow Army Airfield, 56°57′24″N 158°38′18″W

Port Heiden, Alaska Territory, 1941-1945, Closed 1945, now Port Heiden Airport

- Fort Randall Army Airfield, 55°11′56″N 162°43′15″W

Cold Bay, Alaska Territory, Opened March 1942
Hosted Project Hula, a secret program to transfer 149 United States Navy warships to the Soviet Navy and train 12,000 Soviet personnel to operate them, during the spring and summer of 1945
Transferred to Alaskan Air Command, 1945. Became Thornbrough Air Force Base in 1948, Closed September 1, 1953

- Shemya Army Airfield, 52°42′44″N 174°06′43″E

Shemya Island, Aleutian Islands, 1943-1945
Transferred to Alaskan Air Command - became Shemya Air Force Base; later, on 6 April 1993, Shemya Air Force Base was renamed Eareckson Air Station. The renaming ceremony was held 19 May 1993. The Eleventh Air Force Association initiated renaming the base to honor their wartime commander, Colonel William O. Eareckson (1900–1966). From 1941 to 1943, Eareckson personally led all of the difficult missions against the Japanese which were located on two other Aleutian Islands, Kiska and Attu. Eareckson also helped plan the successful retaking of Attu.

=== Support/Transferred airfields ===
- Annette Island Army Airfield, 55°02′13″N 131°34′21″W

Annette Island, Alexander Archipelago
Built 1941, opened 1 March 1942. AAF/Civil joint-use airport used as refueling/servicing of transport aircraft between Washington State and Elmendorf. The Royal Canadian Air Force, through its RCAF Western Air Command, operated fighter and bomber aircraft from here, backing up US units closer to the Japanese occupied islands. RCAF 115 Squadron flew Bristol Bolingbroke aircraft; RCAF 118 and 135 Squadrons flew P-40s. 149 Squadron operated Lockheed Ventura torpedo bombers. Closed 1945 and turned over to War Assets Administration for disposition, 1946. Jurisdiction transferred to private ownership in 1947 and now Annette Island Airport.

- Bethel Air Base, 60°46′29″N 161°43′24″W

Bethel, Alaska Territory
Construction began 21 September 1941, activated 4 July 1942; Used by Air Transport Command as auxiliary airfield for Lend-Lease aircraft being flown to Siberia; Transferred to Eleventh Air Force, then to Alaskan Air Command, 1945; became joint-use Bethel Airport, used for construction of AC&W Bethel Air Force Station in the mid-1950s. Full jurisdiction turned over to Alaska Government 1958, now a civil airport.

- Big Delta Army Airfield, 63°59′42″N 145°43′12″W

Fairbanks, Alaska Territory
Built 1942 for Air Transport Command; Host unit was 1465th AAFBU. Alaskan Division, ATC. Was used on Northwest Staging Route ferrying Lend-Lease aircraft; Also used by Eleventh Air Force for staging and emergency use. Transferred to Eleventh Air Force, then to Alaskan Air Command, 1945; transferred to United States Army 1948, now Fort Greely

- Cordova Airport, 60°29′31″N 145°28′32″W

Cordova, Alaska Territory
Construction began 22 June 1941, activated 1 April 1941. Became AAF/Civil joint-use airport used as refueling/servicing of transport aircraft between Washington State and Elmendorf. Closed 1945 and turned over to War Assets Administration for disposition, 1946. Jurisdiction transferred to private ownership in 1949 and now Cordova Municipal Airport.

- Gakona Landing Strip, 62°18′06″N 145°17′29″W

Gakona, Alaska Territory
Emergency 3,000' rolled gravel landing strip bulldozed in 1943, located adjacent to Gakona, Alaska, aligned 03/21. Abandoned after the war, now the right-of-way is a part of Alaska Highway 1.

- Galena Airport, 64°44′10″N 156°56′04″W

Galena, Alaska Territory
Constructed 1942 by Air Transport Command, Host unit was 1468th AAFBU. Alaskan Division, ATC. Was used as refueling/servicing airfield for transfer of Lend-Lease aircraft to Siberia; Also used by Eleventh Air Force for staging and emergency use. Transferred to Eleventh Air Force, then to Alaskan Air Command, 1945

- Gambell Army Airfield, 63°46′04″N 171°43′59″W

Gambell, St. Lawrence Island
Constructed 1943 by Air Transport Command, used as refueling/servicing airfield for transfer of Lend-Lease aircraft to Siberia; Transferred to Eleventh Air Force, then to Alaskan Air Command, 1945 and closed, turned over to War Assets Administration for disposition, 1946. Jurisdiction transferred to private ownership in 1950 and now Gambell Airport.

- Juneau Airport, 58°21′20″N 134°34′29″W

Juneau, Alaska Territory
Opened on 1 July 1941 as a civil airport. Used as a military refueling/servicing stop for transport aircraft between Washington State and Elmendorf.

- Kiska Army Airfield, 51°58′19″N 177°31′12″E

Kiska Island, Aleutian Islands
Captured Japanese airfield under construction at time of liberation, 1943. Completed by AAF Engineers and used as auxiliary transport airfield in Aleutians. Closed 1945 and abandoned.

- Ladd Army Airfield, 64°50′15″N 147°36′51″W

Fairbanks, Alaska Territory
Constructed 1939, prewar mission was cold weather testing of aircraft and equipment; became Air Transport Command airfield in 1942, Host unit was 1466th AAFBU. Alaskan Division, ATC. Was main transfer point for Northwest Staging Route Lend-Lease aircraft from United States ATC pilots to Soviet Red Air Force pilots; aircraft then flown to Siberia after transfer. Transferred to Eleventh Air Force, then to Alaskan Air Command, 1945. In 1961 it was transferred to the Army and re-designated Fort Wainwright in honor of World War II general Jonathan Wainwright. From 1963 to 1972 it was home to the 171st Infantry Brigade, mechanized until 1969, then light. During that time, the 172nd Infantry Brigade was at Fort Richardson, in Anchorage. From 1986 to 1998 Fort Wainwright was the home of the 6th Infantry Division (Light), and served as the division's headquarters from 1990 to 1994. From 1998 to 2006, it was home to the 172nd Infantry Brigade, which was reorganized in 2003 as the 172nd Stryker Brigade Combat Team (SBCT), part of the U.S. Army's transition program to include six SBCTs. In 2006, the 172nd was re-flagged as the 1st Brigade of the 25th Infantry Division. Fort Wainwright is also the home of Task Force 49, an aviation brigade that provides logistical air support for U.S. Army Alaska, Bassett Army Community Hospital and the Bureau of Land Management's Alaska Fire Service.

- McGrath Army Airbase, 62°57′10″N 155°36′18″W

Constructed 1941 by CAA a civil airport. Used as a sub-base of Ladd Army Airbase . Used by Air Transport Command as auxiliary airfield for Lend-Lease aircraft being flown to Siberia; Transferred to Eleventh Air Force, then to Alaskan Air Command, 1945; Full jurisdiction turned over to Alaska Government 1947, now a civil airport. Used as a staging facility for construction of AC&W Tatalina Air Force Station in the mid-1950s.

- Marks Army Airfield, 64°30′44″N 165°26′43″W

Nome, Alaska Territory
Constructed 1942, opened 1 July. Used by Air Transport Command as refueling/servicing airfield for Lend-Lease aircraft being flown to Siberia by Soviet Red Air Force pilots. Host unit was 1469th AAFBU. Alaskan Division, ATC. Renamed Marks Army Airfield, 1942. Transferred to Eleventh Air Force, then to Alaskan Air Command, 1945

- Mile 26 Field, 64°39′55″N 147°06′02″W

Moose Creek, Alaska Territory
Constructed 1943 by Air Transport Command; activated on 20 September as Station #4, Alaskan Wing, was auxiliary to Ladd Army Airfield for Northwest Staging Route Lend-Lease aircraft. Transferred to Eleventh Air Force, then to Alaskan Air Command, 1945.

- Moses Point Airstrip, 64°41′53″N 162°03′26″W

Elim, Alaska Territory.
Constructed 1943 as auxiliary landing strip for Marks AAF; Used as servicing airfield for Lend-Lease aircraft being flown to Siberia by Soviet Red Air Force pilots. Transferred to Eleventh Air Force, then to Alaskan Air Command, 1945 and closed, turned over to War Assets Administration for disposition, 1946. Jurisdiction transferred to private ownership in 1947 and now civil airport.

- Naknek Army Airfield, 58°40′36″N 156°38′57″W

King Salmon, Alaska Territory
Activated 1 July 1942 by Air Transport Command. Was transport and maintenance airfield for ATC aircraft servicing Alaska airfields; also provided maintenance for transient aircraft in Alaska. Transferred to Eleventh Air Force, then to Alaskan Air Command in 1945. Became King Salmon Air Force Base.

- Northway Army Airfield, 62°57′40″N 141°55′50″W

Northway, Alaska Territory.
Constructed 1943 by Air Transport Command; Host unit was 1463d AAFBU. Alaskan Division, ATC. Mission was servicing Northwest Staging Route Lend-Lease aircraft from United States. Also used by Eleventh Air Force for staging and emergency use. Transferred to Eleventh Air Force, then to Alaskan Air Command, 1945 and closed, turned over to War Assets Administration for disposition, 1946. Jurisdiction transferred to private ownership in 1947 and now Northway Airport.

- Ogliuga Island Army Airfield, 51°36′22″N 178°39′23″W

Was forward airfield constructed on Ogliuga Island. Operational between 1943 and 1945, used during Aleutian Campaign between Kiska and Adak. The site included an emergency landing field, parking area, and living quarters. Additional facilities were established at this site, including aircraft warning, airway radio communication, and a weather reporting station. No permanent units assigned, abandoned. Reported hazardous munitions still remaining on island.

- Tanacross Air Base, 63°22′25″N 143°20′00″W

Tanacross, Alaska Territory
Constructed 1943, activated 20 September by Air Transport Command as Station #16, Alaskan Wing, later 1464th AAFBU. Alaskan Division, ATC. Was auxiliary to Ladd Army Airfield for Northwest Staging Route Lend-Lease aircraft. Designated Tanacross Air Base, July 1944. Mission was servicing Northwest Staging Route Lend-Lease aircraft from United States. Transferred to Eleventh Air Force, then to Alaskan Air Command, 1945 and closed, turned over to War Assets Administration for disposition, 1946. Jurisdiction transferred to private ownership in 1947 and now Tanacross Airport.

- Walseth Army Airfield, 60°07′37″N 149°25′08″W

Seward, Alaska Territory
Constructed as part of Fort Raymond; closed 1948, turned over to War Assets Administration for disposition. Jurisdiction transferred to Territory of Alaska and now Seward Airport.

- Yakutat Army Airfield, 59°30′31″N 139°39′35″W

Yakutat City and Borough, Alaska Territory
Constructed 1941 as landing field for transport aircraft between Washington State and Elmendorf; activated on 1 March 1942; closed 1945, turned over to War Assets Administration for disposition, 1946. Jurisdiction transferred to private ownership in 1949 and now Yakutat Airport.

In addition many minor airstrips were built for emergency landings. The mission of these bases primarily was the wartime defense of Alaska and the Aleutian Islands and to support the Aleutian Islands Campaign against Japan.

== See also ==
- Eleventh Air Force
- United States Army Air Forces
