= Alaska Airlines Flight 1866 =

1971 fatal jet airliner crash

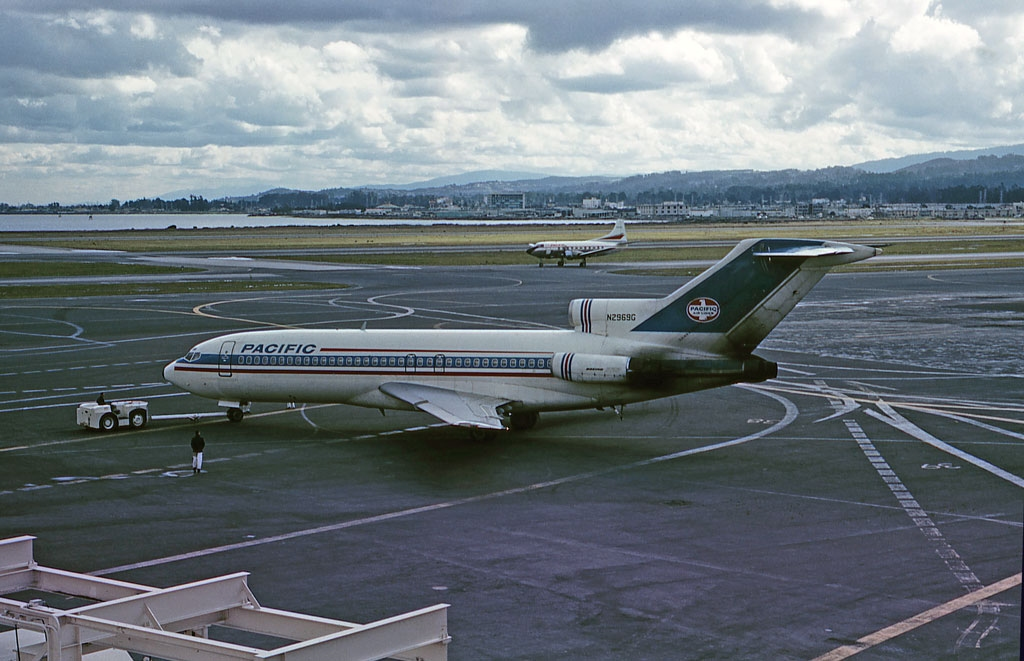
- N2969G, the aircraft involved in the accident, seen in 1967, while still operating with Pacific Air Lines

Accident
- Date: September 4, 1971
- Summary: Controlled flight into terrain due to possible navigational error
- Site: Alexander Archipelago, Haines Borough, Alaska, United States; 58°21′42″N 135°10′12″W

Aircraft
- Aircraft type: Boeing 727-193
- Operator: Alaska Airlines
- IATA flight No.: AS1866
- ICAO flight No.: ASA1866
- Call sign: ALASKA 66
- Registration: N2969G
- Flight origin: Ted Stevens Anchorage International Airport, Anchorage, Alaska
- 1st stopover: Merle K. (Mudhole) Smith Airport, Cordova, Alaska
- 2nd stopover: Yakutat Airport, Yakutat, Alaska
- 3rd stopover: Juneau International Airport, Juneau, Alaska
- Last stopover: Sitka Rocky Gutierrez Airport, Sitka, Alaska
- Destination: Seattle-Tacoma International Airport, Seattle, Washington
- Occupants: 111
- Passengers: 104
- Crew: 7
- Fatalities: 111
- Survivors: 0

Alaska Airlines Flight 1866 was a regularly scheduled passenger flight operated by Alaska Airlines from Anchorage, Alaska, to Seattle, Washington, with several intermediate stops in southeast Alaska. The aircraft was a Boeing 727-100 with U.S. registry N2969G manufactured in 1966. On September 4, 1971, the aircraft operating the flight crashed into a mountain in Haines Borough, about 18 miles west of Juneau, Alaska, while on approach for landing. All 111 people aboard were killed. The subsequent investigation found that erroneous navigation readouts led the crew to descend prematurely. No definitive cause for the misleading data was found. It was the first fatal jet aircraft crash involving Alaska Airlines, and remained the deadliest single-aircraft accident in United States history until June 24, 1975, when Eastern Air Lines Flight 66 crashed. It is still, however, the worst air disaster in Alaska state history.

== Flight crew ==
The captain of the flight was Richard C. Adams, age 41. Adams had 13,870 flight hours, including 2,688 hours on the Boeing 727. Piloting the aircraft at the time of the accident was First Officer Leonard D. Beach, age 32. Beach had 5,000 flight hours, with 2,100 of them on the Boeing 727. James J. Carson, age 30, was the Second Officer and had 2,850 flight hours, including about 2,600 hours on the Boeing 727. Beach and Carson were both hired by Alaska Airlines in 1966, and Adams had been with the airline since 1955. The National Transportation Safety Board (NTSB) later determined that all three flight crew members were current and qualified to operate the flight, and there was no evidence of any conditions which would have adversely affected the performance of their duties.

== Aircraft ==
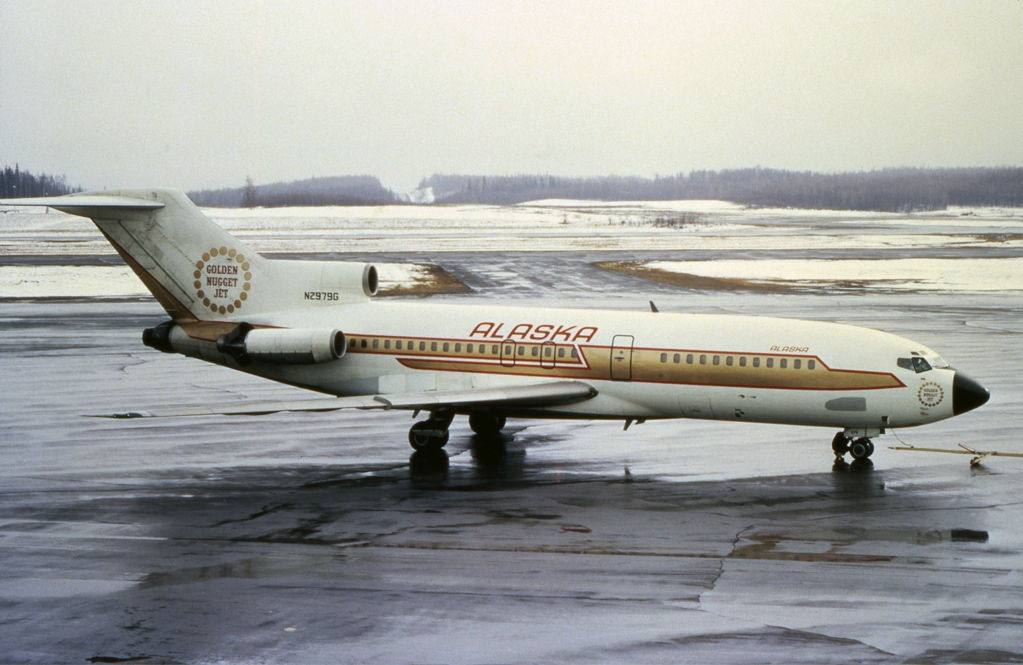
Flight 1866 would have been displayed in a livery similar to this Alaska Airlines Boeing 727-193 at Ted Stevens Anchorage International Airport in April 1971

The aircraft was a Boeing 727-100 with U.S. registry N2969G manufactured in 1966 as c/n 19304 (line number 287). It was initially operated by Pacific Air Lines, which later became part of Hughes Airwest. On April 8, 1970, ownership of the aircraft was transferred to Hughes. Shortly thereafter, on September 25, 1970, Hughes leased it to Alaska Airlines. It had accumulated 11,344 flight hours at the time of the accident. The aircraft was powered by three Pratt & Whitney JT8D-7B turbofan engines. The NTSB determined that the aircraft and engines were properly maintained and in good working order at the time of the accident.

== Accident flight ==
On September 4, 1971, Alaska Airlines Flight 1866 (Air Traffic Control call sign "Alaska 66") was scheduled to depart Anchorage, Alaska (ANC), with intermediate stops in Cordova (CDV), Yakutat (YAK), Juneau (JNU), and Sitka, Alaska (SIT) before continuing to Seattle, Washington (SEA). The flight departed ANC on time at 9:13 a.m. and the first stop at CDV was uneventful, apart from a minor issue with a cargo door which caused a short delay. The aircraft departed CDV at 10:34 and landed at YAK at 11:07. The next leg of the route to JNU, the accident flight, departed YAK at 11:35 a.m. with 104 passengers and 7 crew aboard.

At 11:46 the crew contacted Anchorage air traffic control and reported they were at Flight Level 230 (FL230 or 23,000 feet [7,010 m]), 65 miles (56 nmi; 105 km) east of Yakutat. The controller issued a clearance to descend at pilots' discretion to cross the PLEASANT intersection at 10,000 feet (3,048 m), and gave them a clearance limit of HOWARD intersection. The controller then gave them the current altimeter setting at JNU and requested they report passing 11,000 feet in the descent.

At 11:51 the crew informed the controller they were leaving FL230 descending to be level at 10,000 feet at PLEASANT intersection.

At 11:54 the controller instructed the crew to stop their descent at 12,000 feet and changed the clearance limit to PLEASANT intersection where they could expect to hold. They reported level at 12,000 feet (3,658 m) less than a minute later. The controller explained that he had to change the clearance due to another aircraft in the airspace near JNU. A Piper PA-23 Apache, N799Y, had departed JNU at 11:44 en route to Whitehorse and had reported in the vicinity of HOWARD intersection. The Piper's altitude was unknown and there was some confusion as to the route it was supposed to be flying. Flight 1866 acted as a communication relay between the controller and N799Y for several transmissions.

At 11:58 the flight reported passing PLEASANT and entering the holding pattern there. The controller acknowledged the report and re-cleared them to HOWARD intersection. He then asked them to confirm they were still level at 12,000 feet and asked if they were "on top" of the clouds at that altitude. The crew replied they were level at 12,000, but in the clouds and "on instruments".

At 12:00, the controller repeated the new clearance limit to hold at HOWARD, and told them they could expect to hold there until 12:10. At 12:01 the crew reported entering the holding pattern at HOWARD at 12,000 feet.

At 12:07, the controller asked for their current location in the holding pattern, and direction from HOWARD. The crew reported they were turning on the inbound leg of the hold, joining the localizer course inbound towards HOWARD. The controller then cleared the flight for the straight-in LDA approach to Runway 8 and instructed them to cross HOWARD inbound at or below 9,000 feet (2,743 m). The crew acknowledged the clearance and reported leaving 12,000 feet. The LDA approach consisted of a localizer providing horizontal guidance to the crew. Vertical guidance was provided by instructions on the approach chart; the procedure involved descending to various published altitudes upon crossing specific intersections between the localizer and a nearby VOR station. The localizer was not equipped with distance measuring equipment at the time of the accident.

At 12:08, the Anchorage controller asked them to report their current altitude and the crew responded, "...leaving five thousand five... four thousand five hundred." The crew was then instructed to contact Juneau Tower. The crew acknowledged the transmission and changed to the tower frequency. The flight checked on to the tower frequency, reporting over BARLOW intersection. The tower controller replied, "Alaska 66, understand...I didn't copy the intersection...," and continued his transmission, giving them the current weather conditions and runway in use, and asked them to report over BARLOW. Part of this transmission was recorded on the CVR of the flight, however the recording ended partway through the transmission. There were no further transmissions from Flight 1866.

At approximately 12:15 the aircraft struck the eastern slope of a canyon in the Chilkat Range of the Tongass National Forest at the 2,500-foot (760 m) level, 18.5 miles (16 nmi; 30 km) west of Juneau. The aircraft exploded on impact. According to the CVR and FDR, there was not even "a last-second awareness" among the crew that a collision with terrain was imminent.

When the crew stopped responding, JNU tower notified local authorities in Juneau, who immediately began a search for the aircraft. A few hours later, the wreckage was located on the eastern slope of the Chilkat ridge, west of Juneau airport at the coordinates 58°21′42″N 135°10′12″W. There were no survivors.

Two witnesses in the area of the Chilkat Mountains stated that they heard a low-flying jet aircraft, but could not see it because of clouds and low visibility, which they estimated at 200–300 feet (61–91 m). They described the sound of the engines as normal. A short time later they heard an explosion. A third witness in the area saw a low flying plane disappear into the clouds, but did not report hearing any sound.

== Investigation ==
The U.S. NTSB investigated the accident. The cockpit voice recorder (CVR) and flight data recorder (FDR) were recovered from the crash site and read out. The wreckage was inspected, and pertinent items were removed for further study by both the NTSB and the various manufacturers. After determining that there were no apparent issues with the crew's qualifications or the aircraft, their investigation focused on the navigational equipment and techniques used for the approach. Both navigation radio receivers on the aircraft were found to be in good working order, and all ground-based navigation stations were likewise operating properly. From the CVR recording it was determined that the crew did not use the audio identification features of the navigation radios. Further, they did not use all available navigational aids to help determine their position, though it is noted that the approach they were performing did not specifically require the use of those facilities. In addition the NTSB found there was potentially a lack of crew coordination between the two pilots in their navigation radio tuning procedures. Based on the crew's conversation and the flight's erroneous position report over BARLOW intersection, the NTSB noted that the captain's navigation radio had apparently presented the crew with consistently false information at several points along the approach path. No reason for the false indications could be determined. The NTSB also found that ATC had used proper procedures in handling Flight 1866. The small aircraft that entered the airspace during their descent might have been a distraction for both the controller and the pilots.

The NTSB Final Report was released on October 11, 1972. The investigation found that the following factors contributed to the accident:

The National Transportation Safety Board determines that the probable cause of this accident was a display of misleading navigational information concerning the flight's progress along the localizer course which resulted in a premature descent below obstacle clearance altitude. The origin or nature of the misleading navigational information could not be determined. The Board further concludes that the crew did not use all available navigational aids to check the flight's progress along the localizer nor were these aids required to be used. The crew also did not perform the required audio identification of the pertinent navigational facilities.

— NTSB final report

== Notes ==
The NTSB investigation examined the idea that some sort of military radio jamming technology could have contributed to the apparent false indications of the navigational radios before the accident. The report found no evidence that such interference had taken place and it was discounted as a possible cause. Interestingly, this type of problem is used as a plot device in famed aviation writer Ernest K. Gann's 1973 novel Band of Brothers. In the book, a Boeing 727 crashes after receiving false navigational information as a result of military radio jamming.

== See also ==
- American Airlines Flight 965
- Crossair Flight 3597
- Thai Airways International Flight 311
- Santa Barbara Airlines Flight 518
- Trigana Air Flight 267
- Prinair Flight 277
