= Moses Point Airport =

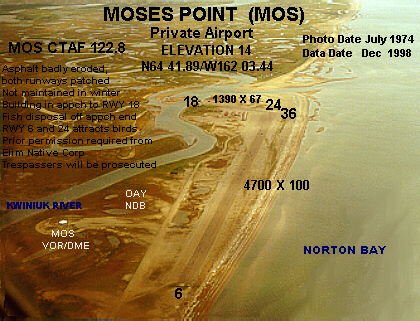
- IATA: MOS; ICAO: none; FAA LID: MOS

Summary
- Airport type: Private
- Owner: Elim Native Corp.
- Serves: Elim, Alaska
- Built: 1943
- Elevation AMSL: 14 ft / 4 m
- Coordinates: 64°41′53″N 162°03′26″W

Map
- Location of airport in Alaska

Runways
Direction	Length		Surface
Direction	ft	m	Surface
6/24	3,000	914	Gravel

Statistics (1988)
- Aircraft operations: 3,510
- Source: Federal Aviation Administration

Moses Point Airport (IATA: MOS, FAA LID: MOS) is an airport located in Elim, a city in the Nome Census Area of the U.S. state of Alaska. It is privately owned by the Elim Native Corporation. Formerly, the field operated as Moses Point Army Airfield during World War II.

== Facilities and aircraft ==
Moses Point Airport has one runway designated 6/24 with a gravel surface measuring 3,000 by 60 feet (914 x 18 m). The runway is badly eroded in spots and is not maintained in the winter. The airport is unattended. Prior permission for use is required from the Elim Native Corp. president or board.

For the 12-month period ending June 16, 1988, the airport had 3,510 aircraft operations, an average of 292 per month: 71% air taxi, 29% general aviation and <1% military.

The runway was damaged by the remnants of Typhoon Merbok in 2022, and cannot be landed on anymore due to severe damage.

== See also ==
- Elim Airport (IATA: ELI, ICAO: PFEL, FAA: ELI), a state-owned public-use airport located three nautical miles (6 km) southwest of the central business district of Elim.
- List of airports in Alaska
