= Annette Island Army Airfield =

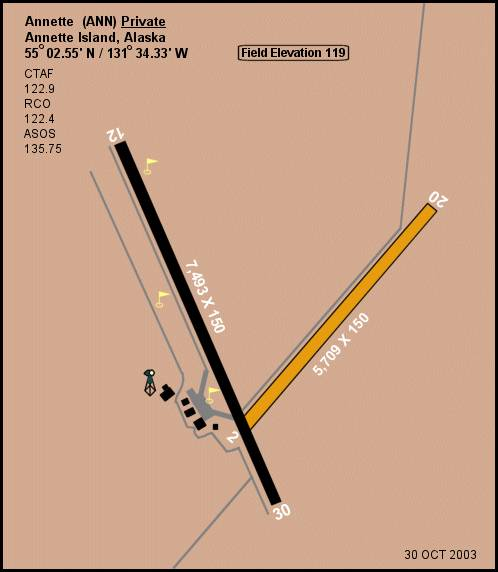
- IATA: none; ICAO: none

Summary
- Airport type: Military
- Owner: United States Army
- Serves: Metlakatla, Alaska
- Location: Annette Island
- Built: 1941
- Elevation AMSL: 119 ft / 36 m
- Coordinates: 55°02′33″N 131°34′20″W

Map
- Location of airport in Alaska

Runways
Direction	Length		Surface
Direction	ft	m	Surface
12/30	7,493	2,284	Asphalt
2/20	5,709	1,740	Gravel

Annette Island Army Airfield is a closed United States Army airfield located on Annette Island in the Prince of Wales – Hyder Census Area of the U.S. state of Alaska. It is located 5 nautical miles (9 km) south of Metlakatla, Alaska. After its closure, it was redeveloped into Annette Island Airport.

== See also ==
- Alaska World War II Army Airfields
