= LT Robert A. Perchard Memorial Trophy =

Outstanding Aircrew Member's Award (LT Robert A. Perchard Memorial Trophy). This award was established in 1963 by the parents and friends of the late Lieutenant Perchard, who died in company with his fellow crewmembers while serving as co-pilot aboard an HU-16E on a rescue mission in Alaska. Through this award, each aviation unit is able to recognize an assigned enlisted aircrew member as having demonstrated exemplary performance and superior technical, aviation, professional, and leadership abilities. The selection of personnel to be honored with the Outstanding Aircrew Member's award is made on a semiannual basis using criteria in keeping with the intent of the award.

== 3 July 1964 ==
Five coast guardsmen were killed when their Grumman HU-16E Albatross, CG Number 7233, crashed on a mountainside near Ketchikan while searching for a grounded fishing vessel. The plane was searching for the fishing vessel Jean, which had grounded on Nunez Rocks and sunk. The aircraft was returning to the Coast Guard Air Station on Annette Island when it apparently crashed on Dall Head on Gravina Island, only three miles from the Air Station. The pilot had radioed for landing instructions just prior to the crash. Crash-related deaths: LCDR Joseph N. Andrassy (CG Aviator #852), LT Robert A. Perchard (CG Aviator #896), AO1 Harry W. Olson, AM2 Don G. Malena, AT3 Edward A. Krajniak

== Notable recipients ==
- Master Chief Petty Officer of the Coast Guard, Eric A. Trent
- Aviation Structural Mechanic First Class, Patrick A. Keller
- Avionics Electrical Technician Second Class, Joanne Cobar
- Aviation Maintenance Technician Third Class, Brett Cox
- Aviation Machinist Mate Senior Chief, Robert C. Crowder
- Aviation Maintenance Technician Second Class, Nathan R. Dodd
- Aviation Survival Technician First Class, Christopher L. Benavidez
- Aviation Electronics Technician First Class, Anthony J. Davern
