= Cordova Army Airfield =

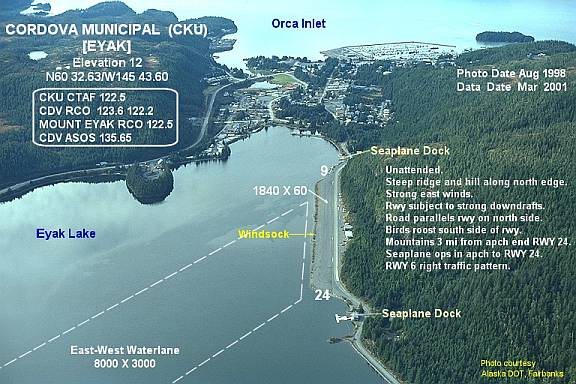
- IATA: none; ICAO: none

Summary
- Airport type: Military
- Owner: United States Army
- Serves: Cordova, Alaska
- Built: 1941
- Elevation AMSL: 12 ft (3.7 m)
- Coordinates: 60°32′38″N 145°43′36″W

Map
- Location of airport in Alaska

Runways
Direction	Length		Surface
Direction	ft	m	Surface
6/24	1,800	549	Gravel

Cordova Army Airfield is a former United States Army airfield located one nautical mile (1.8 km) east of the central business district of Cordova, a city in the Chugach Census Area of the U.S. state of Alaska. Following its closure, it was redeveloped into Cordova Municipal Airport

== See also ==
- Alaska World War II Army Airfields
