= Tanacross Air Base =

- IATA: none; ICAO: none

Summary
- Airport type: Military
- Owner: United States Army
- Location: Tanacross, Alaska
- Built: 1943
- Elevation AMSL: 1,549 ft / 472 m
- Coordinates: 63°22′28″N 143°20′08″W

Map
- Location of airport in Alaska

Runways
| Direction | Length | | Surface |
| Direction | ft | m | Surface |
|---|---|---|---|
| 6/24 | 5,100 | 1,554 |
| 12/30 | 5,000 | 1,524 |
- Source: Federal Aviation Administration

Tanacross Air Base is a former United States Army airfield located one nautical mile (2 km) south of the central business district of Tanacross, in the Southeast Fairbanks Census Area of the U.S. state of Alaska.

== History ==
Constructed 1943, activated 20 September by Air Transport Command as Station #16, Alaskan Wing, later 1464th AAFBU. Alaskan Division, ATC. It was auxiliary to Ladd Army Airfield for Northwest Staging Route Lend-Lease aircraft. The facility was designated Tanacross Air Base in July 1944. Its mission was servicing Northwest Staging Route Lend-Lease aircraft from United States. The facility was transferred to Eleventh Air Force, then to Alaskan Air Command in 1945 and closed; it was turned over to War Assets Administration for disposition in 1946.

Jurisdiction transferred to private ownership in 1947 and redeveloped as Tanacross Airport. One of the hangars at the site later became the Big Dipper Ice Arena in Fairbanks.

== See also ==
- Alaska World War II Army Airfields
- Air Transport Command
- Northwest Staging Route
