= Cordova Municipal Airport =

Airport in Alaska, United States

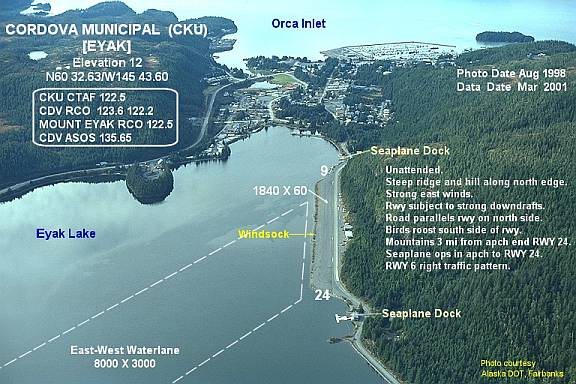
- IATA: CKU; ICAO: none; FAA LID: CKU

Summary
- Airport type: Public
- Owner: State of Alaska DOT&PF - Northern Region
- Location: Cordova, Alaska
- Built: 1941
- Elevation AMSL: 59 ft (18 m)
- Coordinates: 60°32′37″N 145°43′33″W

Map
- Location Cordova Municipal Airport (CKU).

Runways
Direction	Length		Surface
Direction	ft	m	Surface
6/24	1,800	550	Gravel
9W/27W	8,000	2,438	Water

Statistics (2005)
- Aircraft operations: 8,800
- Source: Federal Aviation Administration

Cordova Municipal Airport (IATA: CKU, FAA LID: CKU) is a state-owned public-use airport located one nautical mile (1.8 km) east of the central business district of Cordova, a city in the Chugach Census Area of the U.S. state of Alaska. It is located on Eyak Lake on which it also has a landing area for seaplanes.

Cordova is also served by the Merle K. (Mudhole) Smith Airport which offers scheduled commercial flights including Alaska Airlines jet service.

Formerly, the airport operated as Cordova Army Airfield.

== Facilities and aircraft ==
Cordova Municipal Airport has one runway (6/24) with a 1,800 by 60 ft (549 x 18 m) gravel surface. It also has one seaplane landing area (9W/27W) measuring 8,000 by 3,000 ft (2,438 x 914 m). For the 12-month period ending December 31, 2005, the airport had 8,800 aircraft operations, an average of 24 per day: 60% general aviation and 40% air taxi.

== See also ==
- List of airports in Alaska
