= Tanacross Airport =

- IATA: TSG; ICAO: none; FAA LID: TSG

Summary
- Airport type: Public
- Owner: Bureau of Land Management
- Serves: Tanacross, Alaska
- Built: 1943
- Elevation AMSL: 1,549 ft / 472 m
- Coordinates: 63°22′28″N 143°20′08″W

Map
- Location of airport in Alaska

Runways
Direction	Length		Surface
Direction	ft	m	Surface
6/24	5,100	1,554	Asphalt
12/30	5,000	1,524	Asphalt

Statistics (2005)
- Aircraft operations: 800
- Source: Federal Aviation Administration

Tanacross Airport (IATA: TSG, FAA LID: TSG) is a public use airport located one nautical mile (2 km) south of the central business district of Tanacross, in the Southeast Fairbanks Census Area of the U.S. state of Alaska. It is owned by the Bureau of Land Management.

As per Federal Aviation Administration records, the airport had 80 passenger boardings (enplanements) in calendar year 2008, 32 enplanements in 2009, and 97 in 2010.

This general aviation airport is located 166 miles (267 km) southeast of Fairbanks, Alaska.

== Facilities and aircraft ==
Tanacross Airport has two asphalt paved runways: 6/24 is 5,100 by 150 feet (1,554 x 46 m) and 12/30 is 5,000 by 150 feet (1,524 x 46 m). For the 12-month period ending December 31, 2005, the airport had 800 general aviation aircraft operations, an average of 66 per month.

== History ==
The field was constructed in 1943 as Tanacross Air Base, activated September 20 by Air Transport Command as Station #16, Alaskan Wing, later 1464th AAFBU. Alaskan Division, ATC. Jurisdiction transferred to private ownership in 1947. One of the hangars at the site later became the Big Dipper Ice Arena in Fairbanks.

== See also ==
- List of airports in Alaska
