= Bethel Air Base =

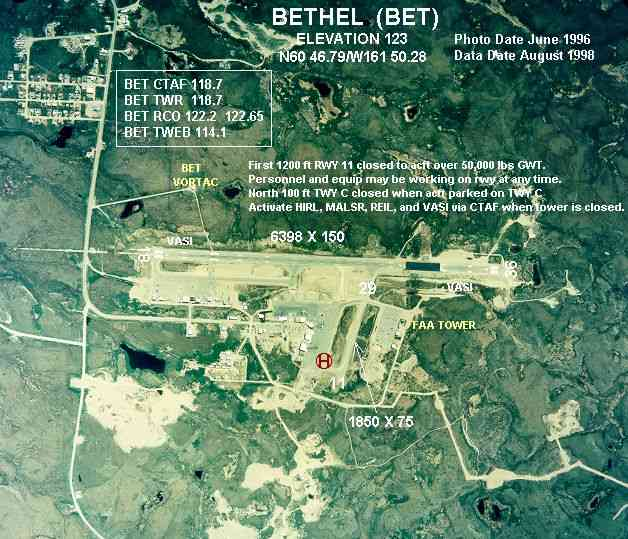
- IATA: none; ICAO: none

Summary
- Airport type: Military
- Owner: United States Army
- Location: Bethel, Alaska
- Elevation AMSL: 129 ft (39 m)
- Coordinates: 60°46′43″N 161°50′14″W

Map
- Location of airport in Alaska

Runways
Direction	Length		Surface
Direction	ft	m	Surface
1L/19R	6,400	1,951	Asphalt
1R/19L	4,000	1,219	Asphalt
12/30	1,858	566	Asphalt/gravel
- Source: Federal Aviation Administration

Bethel Air Base is a former United States Army airfield located three nautical miles (6 km) southwest of the central business district of Bethel, a city in the Bethel Census Area of the U.S. state of Alaska.

== History ==
Construction began 21 September 1941, and the airfield was activated 4 July 1942. It was used by Air Transport Command as auxiliary airfield for Lend-Lease aircraft being flown to Siberia. The facility was transferred to Eleventh Air Force, then to Alaskan Air Command in 1945; it became the joint-use Bethel Airport. It was used for construction of AC&W Bethel Air Force Station in the mid-1950s. Full jurisdiction was turned over to the Alaskan government in 1958.

== See also ==
- Alaska World War II Army Airfields
- Air Transport Command
- Northwest Staging Route
