= Annette Island School District =

School district in Alaska, United States

Location
- Metlakatla, Alaska United States

District information
- Schools: 3
- NCES District ID: 0200525

Students and staff
- Students: 301
- Teachers: 33.8
- Staff: 54.2
- Student–teacher ratio: 8.91

Other information
- Website: www.aisdk12.org

Annette Island School District is a school district headquartered in Metlakatla, Alaska, serving Annette Island Reserve, Alaska's only Indian reservation. As of the 2019–20 school year, it enrolls 310 students across three schools. Around 95% are American Indian or Alaska Native.

In 2007, Richard Johnson Elementary School was named a National Blue Ribbon School.

== Schools ==
- Richard Johnson Elementary School (160 students), PK-5th
- Charles R. Leask Sr. Middle School (82 students), 6th-8th
- Metlakatla High School (68 students), 9th-12th
