= Seward Airport =

Airport in Alaska, United States

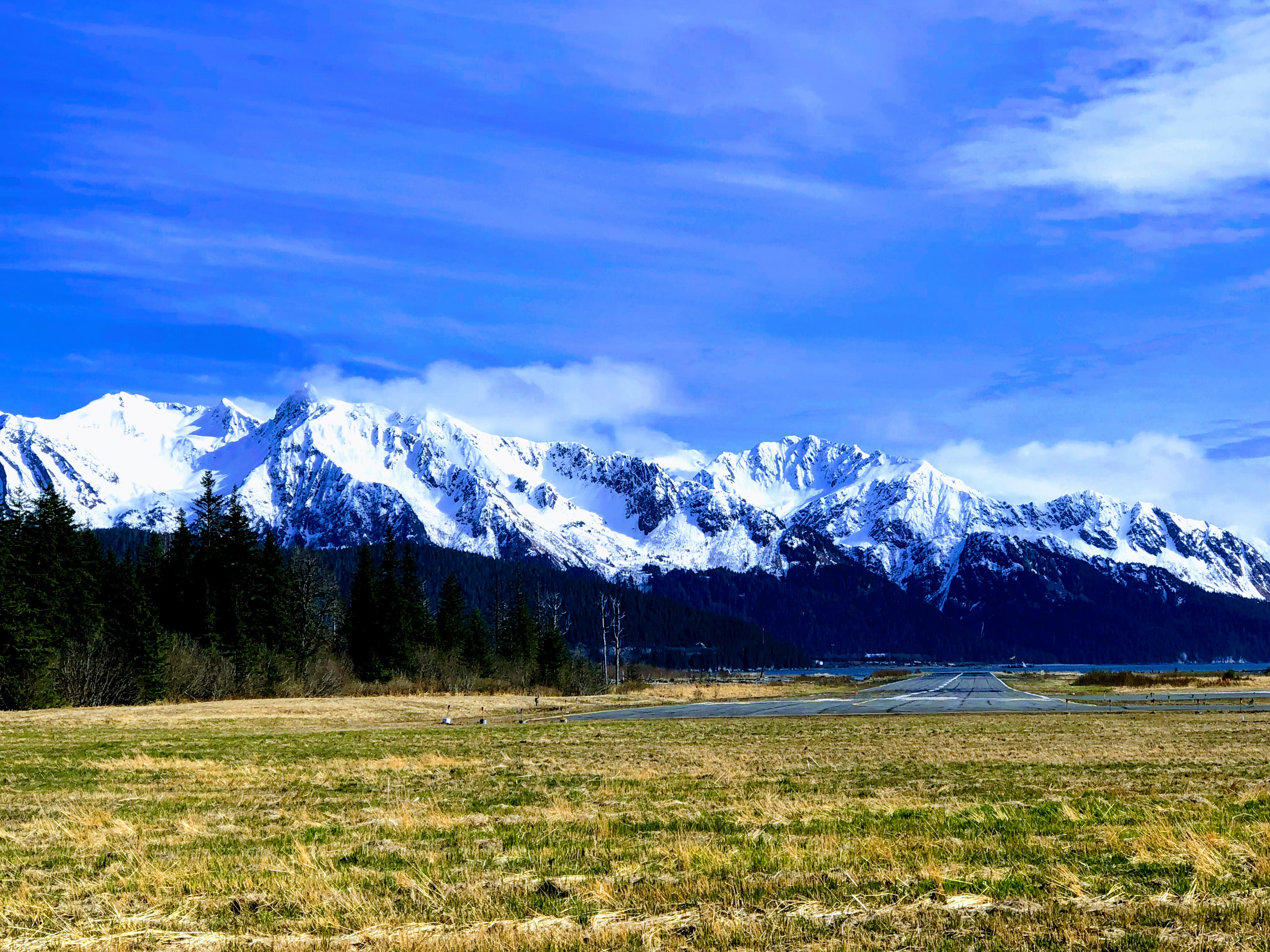
- IATA: SWD; ICAO: PAWD; FAA LID: SWD; WMO: 70277

Summary
- Airport type: Public
- Owner: Alaska DOT&PF - Central Region
- Serves: Seward, Alaska
- Elevation AMSL: 22 ft (6.7 m)
- Coordinates: 60°07′37″N 149°25′08″W

Map
- Location of airport in Alaska

Runways
Direction	Length		Surface
Direction	ft	m	Surface
13/31	4,240	1,292	Asphalt
16/34	2,279	695	Asphalt

Statistics (2009)
- Aircraft operations: 10,510
- Based aircraft: 25
- Source: Federal Aviation Administration

Seward Airport (IATA: SWD, ICAO: PAWD, FAA LID: SWD) is a state-owned, public-use airport located two nautical miles (2.3 miles; 3.7 km) northeast of the central business district of Seward, a city in Kenai Peninsula Borough of the U.S. state of Alaska. This airport is included in the FAA's National Plan of Integrated Airport Systems for 2011–2015, which categorized it as a general aviation facility.

== History ==
The airport was built during World War II. It was named Walseth Air Force Base in honor of Major Marvin E. Walseth, a United States Army Air Forces pilot who died when his aircraft crashed on Umnak in July 1942 while returning from a reconnaissance mission over Kiska. It was closed by the United States Air Force in April 1947. It was excessed to the War Assets Administration and taken over by the Territory of Alaska.

The airport previously had scheduled passenger service to Anchorage (ANC) provided by several commuter air carriers over the years but does not have airline flights at the present time.

== Facilities and aircraft ==
Seward Airport covers an area of 302 acres (122 ha) at an elevation of 22 feet (6.7 m) above mean sea level. It has two asphalt paved runways: 13/31 is 4,240 by 100 feet (1,292 by 30 m) and 16/34 is 2,279 by 75 feet (695 by 23 m).

For the 12-month period ending December 31, 2009, the airport had 10,510 aircraft operations, an average of 28 per day: 57% general aviation, 43% air taxi, and <1% military. At that time there were 25 single-engine aircraft based at this airport.

== See also ==
- Alaska World War II Army Airfields
- List of airports in Alaska
