= Naknek Air Force Base =

US Air Force base in Alaska

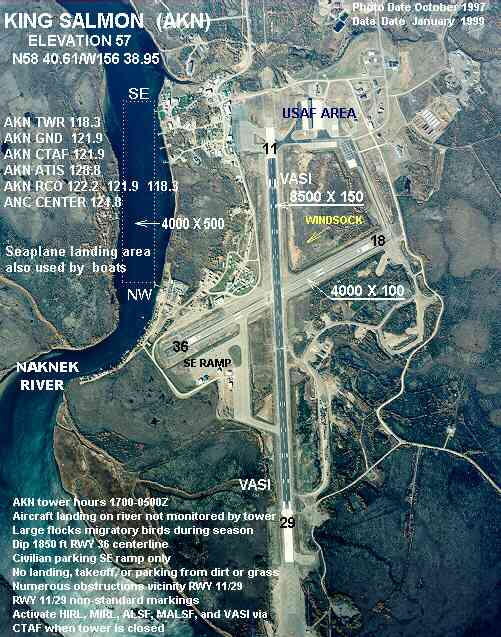
- IATA: none; ICAO: none

Summary
- Airport type: Military
- Owner: United States Air Force
- Location: King Salmon, Alaska
- Elevation AMSL: 73 ft / 22 m
- Coordinates: 58°40′35″N 156°38′55″W

Map
- Location of airport in Alaska

Runways
Direction	Length		Surface
Direction	ft	m	Surface
12/30	8,901	2,713	Asphalt
18/36	4,017	1,224	Asphalt
- Source: Federal Aviation Administration

Naknek Air Force Base is a former United States Air Force base located just southeast of King Salmon, in the Bristol Bay Borough of the U.S. state of Alaska. Following its closure, it has since been redeveloped into King Salmon Airport.

The United States Army Air Corps built Naknek Air Base in 1941. The military established a rest and recreation camp at the Naknek River Rapids called Rapids Camp, and another at the west end of Naknek Lake called Lake Camp. In the 1950s, the base was renamed King Salmon Air Station.

== See also ==
- Alaska World War II Army Airfields
- Air Transport Command
- Northwest Staging Route
