= Gakona Landing Strip =

Abandoned airfield near Gakona, Alaska, U.S.

Gakona Landing Strip
- Part of Eleventh Air Force
- Gakona, Alaska

Site information
- Type: Military airfield
- Controlled by: United States Army Air Forces

Location
- Coordinates: 62°18′06″N 145°17′29″W

Site history
- Built: 1942
- In use: 1943-1944
- Battles/wars: Aleutian Islands Campaign

Gakona Landing Strip is an abandoned airfield located near Gakona in the U.S. state of Alaska.

== History ==
The strip was used by the United States Army Air Forces (USAAF) as an emergency landing field for aircraft assigned to Alaska during World War II. It was closed after the war.

== See also ==
- Alaska World War II Army Airfields
