= Eric A. Trent =

7th Master Chief Petty Officer of the Coast Guard

Rick Trent
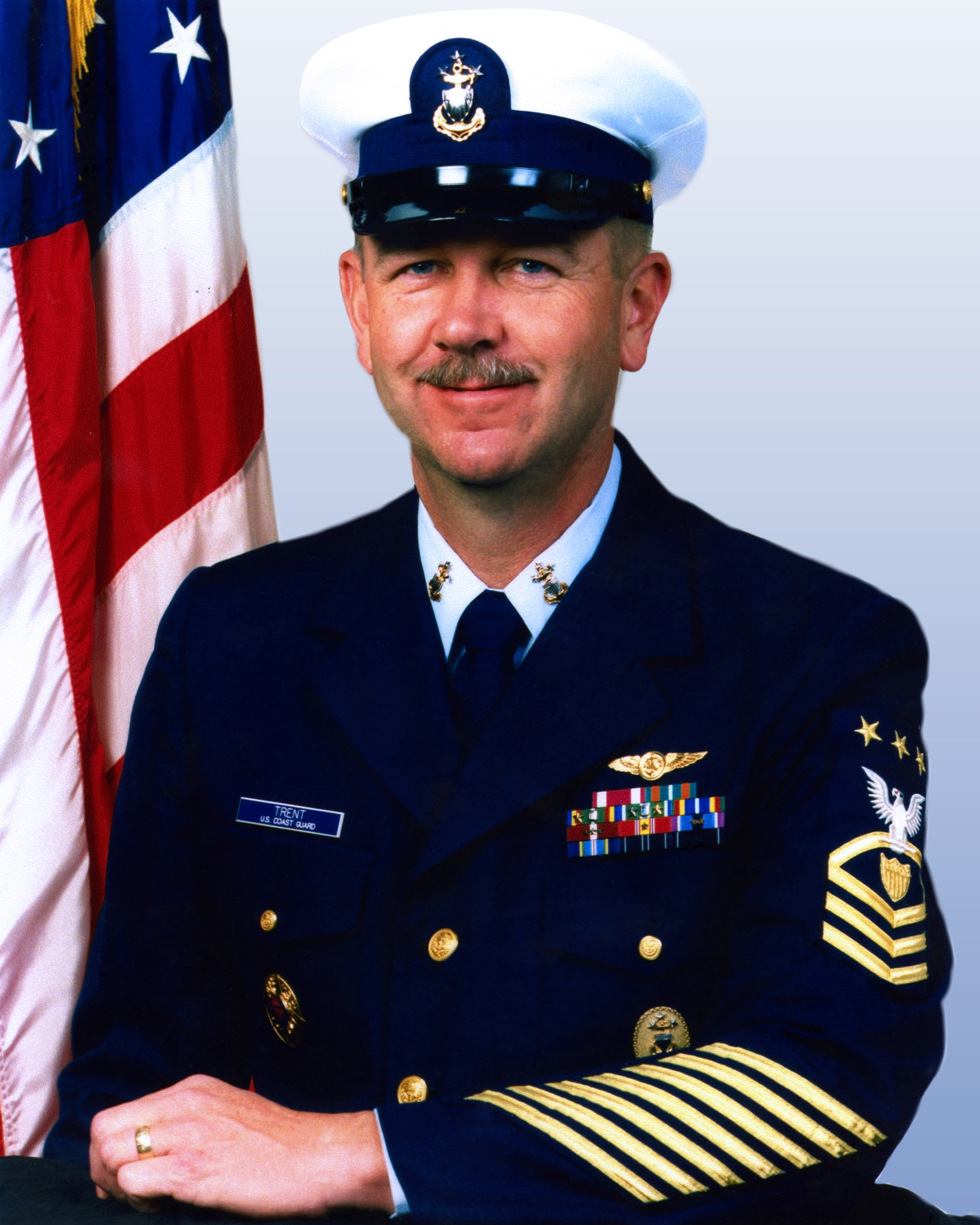
- MCPOCG Eric A. Trent
- Born: June 23, 1944 (age 82); Coronado, California, U.S.
- Military career
- Allegiance: United States of America
- Branch: United States Coast Guard
- Service years: 1963?–1998
- Rank: Master Chief Petty Officer of the Coast Guard
- Nickname: Rick
- Conflicts: Cold War
- Awards: Coast Guard Distinguished Service Medal; Meritorious Service Medal

Master Chief Aviation Electronics Technician Eric Anthony "Rick" Trent (born June 23, 1944) served as the seventh master chief petty officer of the Coast Guard from July 1, 1994, to May 31, 1998.

== Coast Guard career ==
Trent served as the seventh master chief petty officer of the Coast Guard from July 1, 1994, to May 31, 1998. Previous command cadre assignments included Command Master Chief for the Aviation Training Center in Mobile, Alabama and the Coast Guard Pacific Area in Alameda, California.

A Coast Guard veteran of more than 35 years, Trent's assignments included air stations in Massachusetts, Bermuda, Alabama, Hawaii, and Florida. He held search and rescue aircrewman designations on HU-16, HC-130, HH3F, and HH-52 aircraft. In flight, he normally fulfilled the duties of radioman, navigator, and hoist operator. Other experience has included Electronics Technician, Collateral Duty Command Master Chief, Collateral Duty Career Information Specialist and Avionics Leading Chief Petty Officer.

Trent attended more than 20 specialized training courses during his career. He is a graduate of the Coast Guard Senior Leadership and Management School, the Coast Guard Chief Petty Officer Academy, the DEOMI Equal Opportunity Program Managers Course.

While attending the Coast Guard Chief Petty Officer Academy, he was selected by his peers to receive the "Spirit of the Chief Award". Other recognition included the LT Robert A. Perchard Memorial Trophy, the Mobile Chapter Chief Petty Officer Association "Chief of the Year" award; and he was the "Coast Guard Enlisted Ancient Albatross" from December 1, 1995, to June 30, 1998. He is married to Linda.

Prior to becoming the master chief petty officer of the Coast Guard, he was stationed at Coast Guard Air Station San Francisco.

== Awards ==
Trent's military awards include the Coast Guard Distinguished Service Medal (of which he was the first enlisted recipient), two Coast Guard Meritorious Service Medals, the Coast Guard Achievement Medal, the Secretary's Outstanding Unit Award, two Coast Guard Unit Commendations with "O" device, seven Coast Guard Meritorious Unit Commendations with "O" device, the Bicentennial Unit Commendation, ten Coast Guard Good Conduct Medals, two National Defense Service Medals, three Humanitarian Service Medals, the Special Operations Service ribbon, and the Coast Guard Rifle and Pistol Marksmanship ribbons.

=== Coast Guard Distinguished Service Medal citation ===
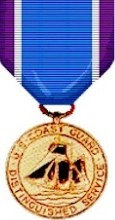

The President of the United States of America takes pleasure in presenting the Coast Guard Distinguished Service Medal to Master Chief Petty Officer Eric A. "Rick" Trent, United States Coast Guard, for exceptionally meritorious and distinguished service in a position of great responsibility to the Government of the United States, as Master Chief Petty Officer of the Coast Guard from July 1994 to May 1998, culminating 35 years of selfless service to the Nation. His superior insights on leadership, command relationships and management effectiveness made him a highly valued advisor to the Commandant of the Coast Guard as well as the Secretary of Defense, Joint Chiefs of Staff, and unit commands throughout the Coast Guard. Master Chief Trent maintained an ongoing dialogue with Coast Guard enlisted personnel by visiting over 300 units throughout the Service. He maximized the use of technology by creating a web site as a means to instantaneously update the fleet on the latest changes in Coast Guard policy. He provided far reaching insight as a member of numerous guidance and senior management teams and as an advisor to the Navy Mutual Aid Association, USO World Board of Governors and the Armed Services YMCA. Master Chief Trent significantly improved the chief's Call to Initiation program by providing policy guidance and standardizing the way initiations are conducted Coast Guard wide. He also enhanced the Enlisted Person of the Year program. Promoting Team Coast Guard, Master chief Trent was a driving force in establishing a Leadership Center of Excellence at the Coast Guard Academy in New London, Connecticut. He has truly been a superb ambassador for the Coast Guard and its enlisted personnel throughout his long and distinguished career. He is the most outstanding "leader" in our enlisted corps. Master Chief Petty Officer Trent's leadership, dedication, and devotion to duty are most heartily commended and are in keeping with the highest traditions of the United States Coast Guard.

Military offices
Preceded by R. Jay Lloyd	Master Chief Petty Officer of the Coast Guard; 1994–1998	Succeeded by Vincent W. Patton III
