= Yakutat Army Airfield =

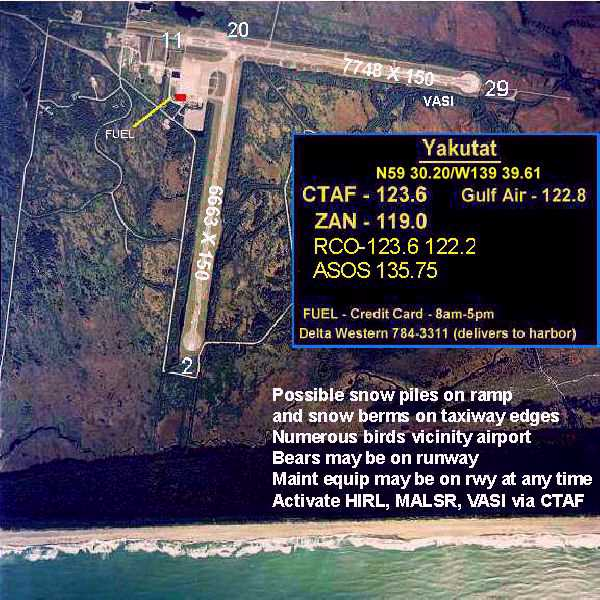
- IATA: none; ICAO: none

Summary
- Airport type: Military
- Owner: United States Army
- Location: Yakutat, Alaska
- Elevation AMSL: 33 ft / 10 m
- Coordinates: 59°30′12″N 139°39′37″W

Map
- Location of airport in Alaska

Runways
Direction	Length		Surface
Direction	ft	m	Surface
2/20	6,475	1,974	Concrete
11/29	7,745	2,361	Asphalt

Yakutat Army Airfield is a former United States Army airfield located three nautical miles (6 km) southeast of the central business district of Yakutat, a city and borough in the U.S. state of Alaska which has no road access to the outside world. After its closure, it was redeveloped into Yakutat Airport.

== History ==
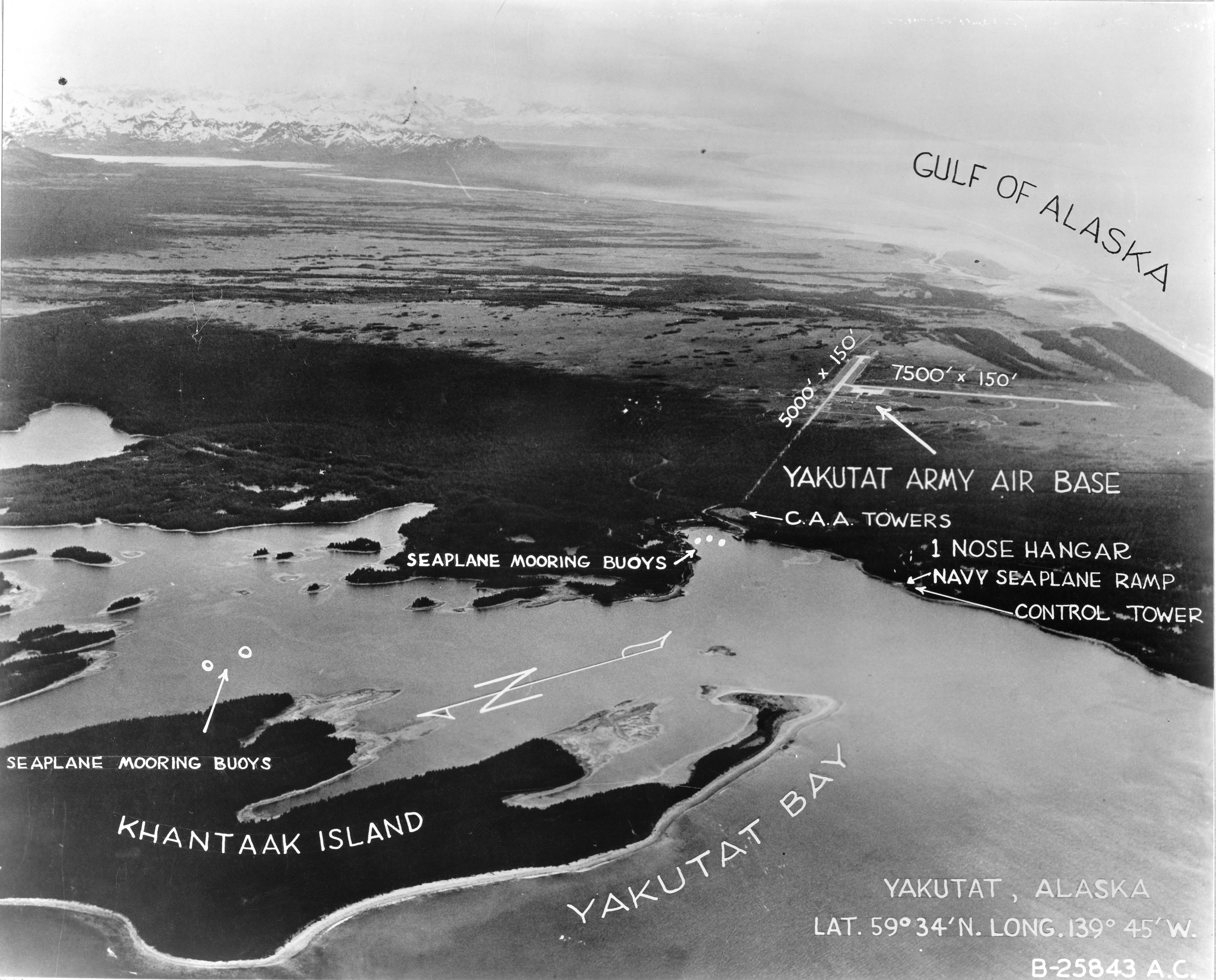
1940s

Yakutat Army Airfield was constructed as part of the United States Army's long-range defense program for Alaska. During World War II the airfield was a key USAAF base during the Aleutian Campaign. It was used in combat by the 406th Bombardment Squadron (June–November 1942) (28th Bombardment Group).

== See also ==
- Alaska World War II Army Airfields
- List of airports in Alaska

== Other sources ==
- This article incorporates public domain material from the Air Force Historical Research Agency
- Maurer, Maurer (1983). Air Force Combat Units Of World War II. Maxwell AFB, Alabama: Office of Air Force History. ISBN 0-89201-092-4.
- Maurer, Maurer (1969), Combat Squadrons of the Air Force, World War II, Air Force Historical Studies Office, Maxwell AFB, Alabama. ISBN 0-89201-097-5
