= Moses Point Army Airfield =

- IATA: none; ICAO: none

Summary
- Airport type: Military
- Location: Elim, Alaska
- Built: 1943
- Elevation AMSL: 14 ft / 4 m
- Coordinates: 64°41′53″N 162°03′26″W

Map
- Location of airport in Alaska

Runways
Direction	Length		Surface
Direction	ft	m	Surface
6/24	3,000	914	Gravel
- Federal Aviation Administration

Moses Point Army Airfield is a former United States Army airfield located in Elim, a city in the Nome Census Area of the U.S. state of Alaska.

== See also ==
- Alaska World War II Army Airfields
- Air Transport Command
- Northwest Staging Route
