= Kiska Army Airfield =

Kiska Army Airfield
- Part of Eleventh Air Force
- Kiska, Aleutian Islands, Alaska

Site information
- Type: Military airfield
- Controlled by: United States Army Air Forces

Location
- Coordinates: 51°58′18″N 177°31′17″E

Site history
- Built: 1942
- In use: 1943-1944
- Battles/wars: Aleutian Islands Campaign

Kiska Army Airfield is an abandoned military airfield, first Japanese and then US, on Kiska island, Aleutian Islands, Alaska, USA.

== History ==
The airfield on Kiska island, and a seaplane base, were built by the occupying Japanese forces during the Second World War in 1942 after the Battle of Dutch Harbor. Thousands of US and 6000 Canadian troops landed on 15 August. The Japanese garrison of 5,183 troops and civilians were evacuated from the island on July 23 under the cover of fog.

After the island was secured, the airfield was used by some transient USAAF aircraft until the end of the war, but no permanent aircraft were assigned. The 119th Army Airways Communications Squadron established a communications site at the airfield on 25 August 1943. The unit operated until 25 October 1945 when it was closed and the base was abandoned.

There are many dumps of US and Japanese material. Right-hand drive Japanese truck frames are piled up, along with Zero aircraft engines and other residue of Japanese occupation. There are extensive support structures, such as a water hydrant. Standing and collapsed US structures remain. US dump sites contain many 3-inch shells and other debris, and aircraft wreckage, which may include a B-17.

== See also ==
- Alaska World War II Army Airfields
