= Northway Army Airfield =

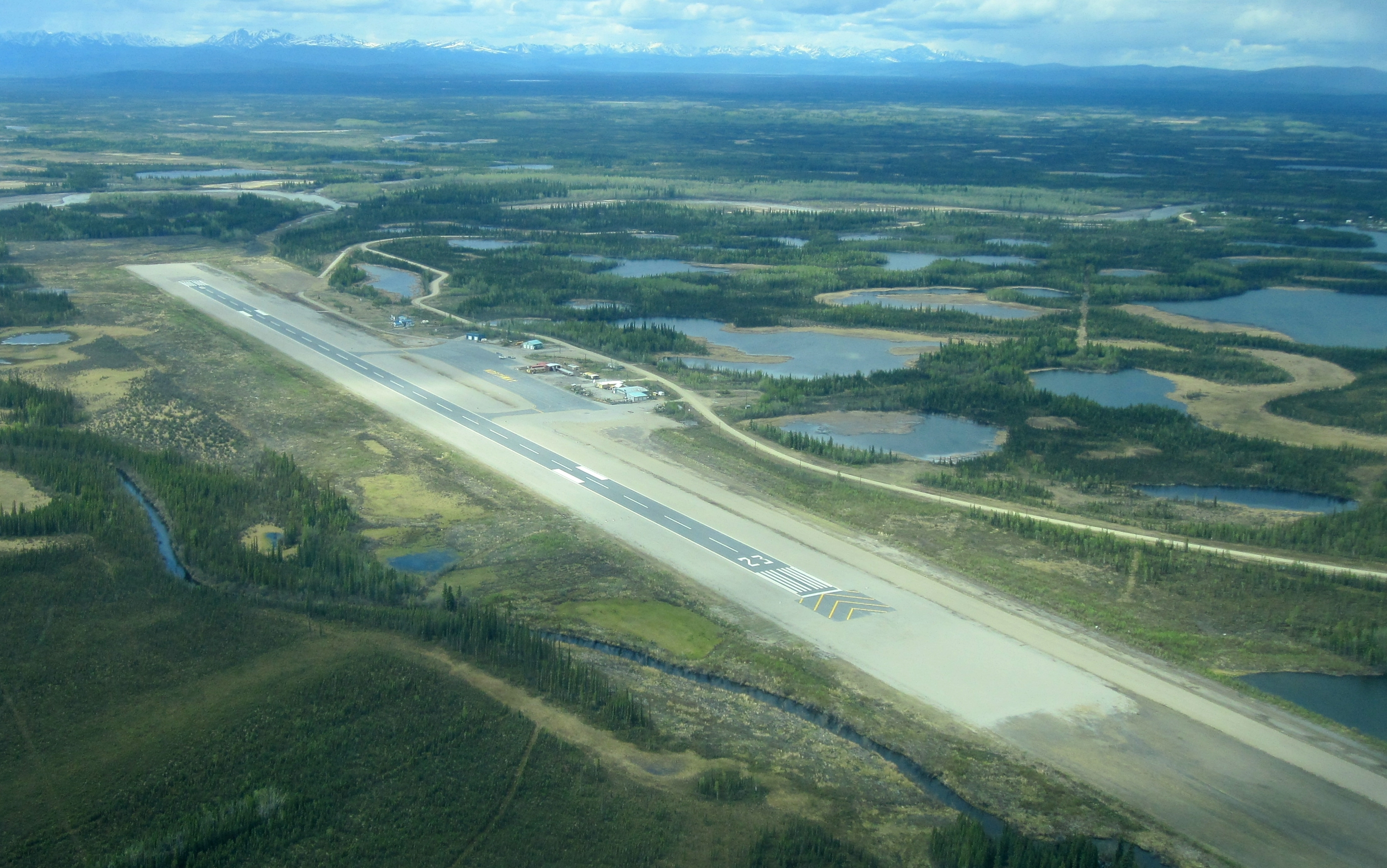
- IATA: none; ICAO: none

Summary
- Airport type: Military
- Owner: United States Army
- Location: Northway, Alaska
- Elevation AMSL: 1,715 ft / 523 m
- Coordinates: 62°57′40″N 141°55′41″W

Map
- Location of airport in Alaska

Runways
Direction	Length		Surface
Direction	ft	m	Surface
5/23	5,100	1,554	Asphalt
- Source: Federal Aviation Administration

Northway Army Airfield is a former United States Army airfield located in Northway, a community located in the Southeast Fairbanks Census Area of the U.S. state of Alaska. During World War II for northbound Lend-Lease aircraft on the Northwest Staging Route, the flight strip at Northway was the first stop in the Territory of Alaska. It is now the state owned Northway Airport.

== See also ==
- Alaska World War II Army Airfields
- Air Transport Command
- Northwest Staging Route
