= Northway Airport =

Airport in Alaska, United States

Northway Airport (former Northway Airfield)
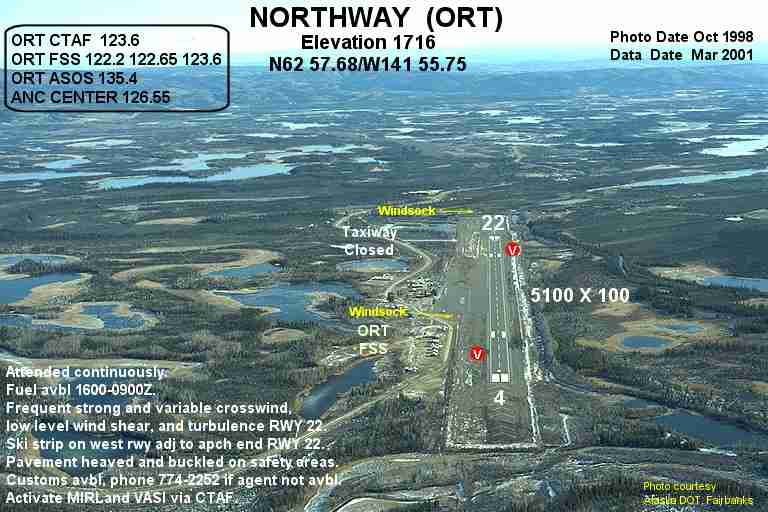
- IATA: ORT; ICAO: PAOR; FAA LID: ORT; WMO: 70291

Summary
- Airport type: Public
- Owner: Alaska DOT&PF - Northern Region
- Serves: Northway, Alaska
- Elevation AMSL: 1,715 ft / 523 m
- Coordinates: 62°57′40″N 141°55′41″W

Map
- Location of airport in Alaska

Runways
Direction	Length		Surface
Direction	ft	m	Surface
5/23	5,100	1,554	Asphalt

Statistics (2005)
- Aircraft operations: 15,800
- Source: Federal Aviation Administration

Northway Airport (IATA: ORT, ICAO: PAOR, FAA LID: ORT) is a state-owned public-use airport serving Northway, a community located in the Southeast Fairbanks Census Area of the U.S. state of Alaska. It is included in the National Plan of Integrated Airport Systems for 2011–2015, which categorized it as a general aviation facility.

During World War II for northbound Lend-Lease aircraft on the Northwest Staging Route, the flight strip at Northway Army Airfield was the first stop in the Territory of Alaska.

== Facilities and aircraft ==
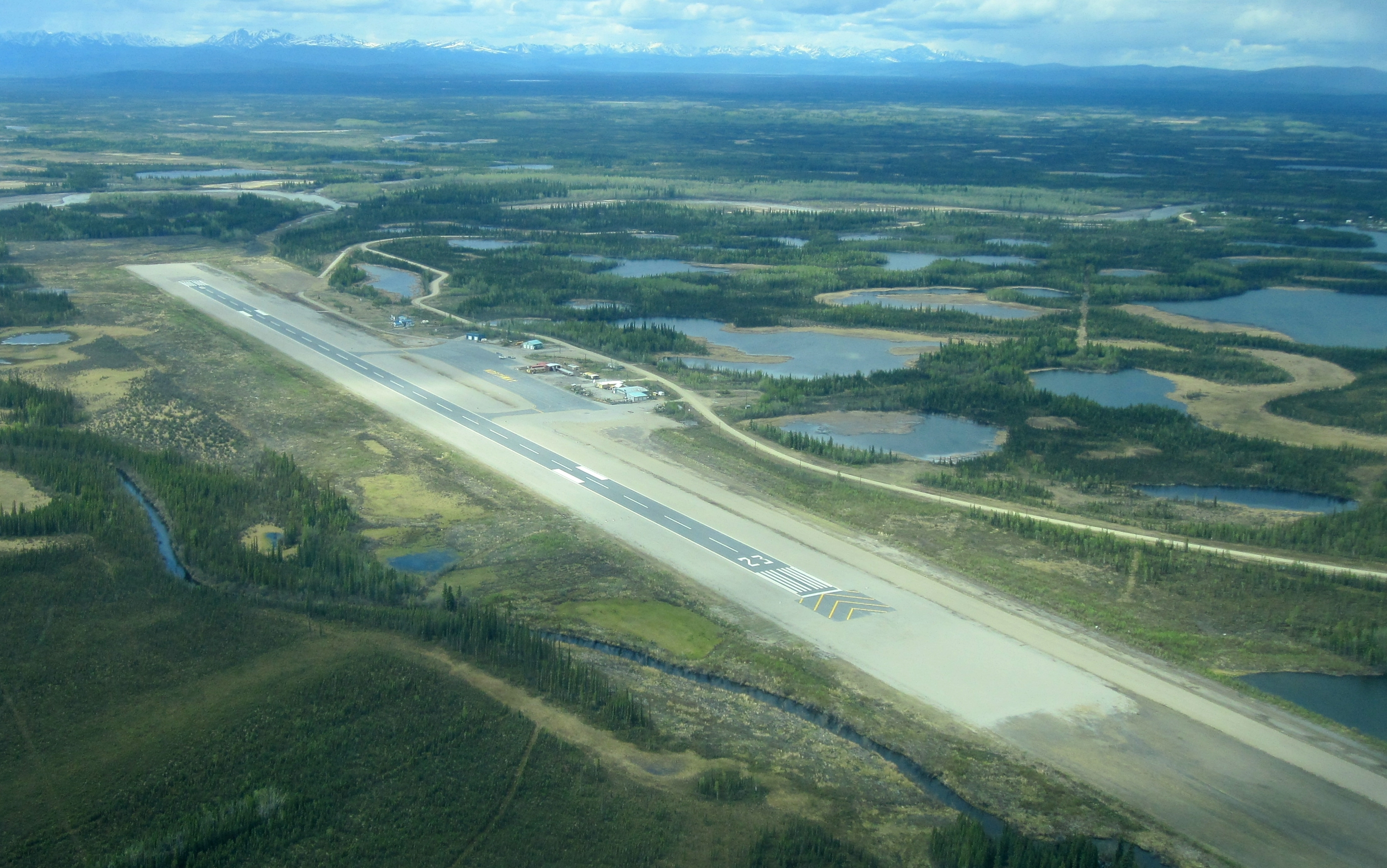
Northway Airport, Northway, Alaska

Northway Airport covers an area of 1,150 acres (465 ha) at an elevation of 1,715 feet (523 m) above mean sea level. It has one runway designated 5/23 with an asphalt surface measuring 5,100 by 100 feet (1,554 x 30 m).

For the 12-month period ending December 31, 2005, the airport had 15,800 aircraft operations, an average of 43 per day: 73% general aviation, 25% air taxi, and 2% military.

== Airlines and destinations ==
Airlines	Destinations
40-Mile Air	Tok

== See also ==
- List of airports in Alaska
