= Annette Island Airport =

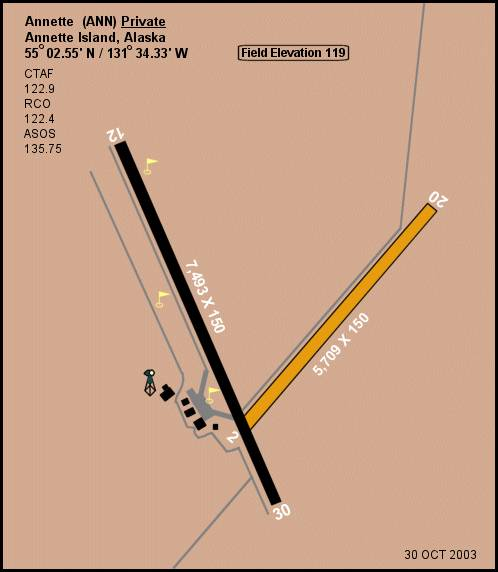
- IATA: ANN; ICAO: PANT; FAA LID: ANN; WMO: 70398

Summary
- Airport type: Private
- Owner: United States Army
- Serves: Metlakatla, Alaska
- Location: Annette Island
- Built: 1941
- Elevation AMSL: 119 ft (36 m)
- Coordinates: 55°02′33″N 131°34′20″W

Map
- Location of airport in Alaska

Runways
Direction	Length		Surface
Direction	ft	m	Surface
12/30	7,493	2,284	Asphalt
2/20	5,709	1,740	Gravel

Statistics (1990)
- Aircraft operations: 8,400
- Source: Federal Aviation Administration

Annette Island Airport (IATA: ANN, ICAO: PANT, FAA LID: ANN) is located on Annette Island in the Prince of Wales – Hyder Census Area of the U.S. state of Alaska. It is located 5 nautical miles (9 km) south of Metlakatla, Alaska. The airport was established as the Annette Island Army Airfield during World War II and initially served as a military airbase.

== Facilities and aircraft ==
Annette Island Airport has two runways: 12/30 is 7,493 by 150 feet (2,284 x 46 m) with an asphalt surface and 2/20 is 5,709 by 150 feet (1,740 x 46 m) with a gravel surface. For the 12-month period ending January 16, 1990, the airport had 8,400 aircraft operations, an average of 23 per day: 64% general aviation, 24% military, and 12% air taxi.

== Historical airline service ==
Prior to the opening of the Ketchikan International Airport (KTN) in 1973, the Annette Island Airport served as the primary airfield for scheduled passenger service for Ketchikan which is located approximately 20 air miles to the north. In 1947, Pan American World Airways was operating daily nonstop service to Seattle and Juneau with Douglas DC-4 prop aircraft with no change of plane flights operated twice a week to Whitehorse in the Yukon Territory of Canada via Juneau and then continuing on to Fairbanks, Galena and Nome in Alaska. Pan Am later operated Douglas DC-6B and Boeing 377 Stratocruiser aircraft into the airport. During the late 1950s, Pacific Northern Airlines (PNA, the successor of Woodley Airways) served the airport with Lockheed Constellation propliners with nonstop service to Seattle and Juneau as well as direct, no change of plane flights to Anchorage, Cordova and Yakutat.

The airport's first jet service arrived during the early 1960s. In 1963, Pan Am was flying Boeing 707 jetliners into the airport with a daily roundtrip routing of Seattle – Annette Island – Juneau. By 1965, Pacific Northern was operating Boeing 720 jetliners on nonstop flights to Seattle and Juneau as well as on direct services to Anchorage via Juneau. In 1967, Pacific Northern was acquired by and merged into Western Airlines which continued to operate jet service into the airport. By 1968, Western was serving the airport with Boeing 720B jetliners with nonstop service to Seattle and Juneau as well as direct, no change of plane flights to Portland, OR, San Francisco and Los Angeles. In 1971, the federal Civil Aeronautics Board (CAB) awarded Alaska Airlines new route authority which enabled this air carrier to begin jet service into Annette Island Airport thus replacing Western.

With the opening of the Ketchikan International Airport in 1973, Annette Island lost all scheduled passenger jet flights as such airline service then moved to the then-new Ketchikan airport. Prior to the opening of the Ketchikan airport in 1973, Alaska Airlines was also operating scheduled flights with Super Catalina and Grumman Goose prop-driven amphibian aircraft on the short hop between Annette Island Airport and the Ketchikan Harbor Seaplane Base serving Ketchikan as well as to other local destinations in southeast Alaska.

== See also ==
- List of airports in Alaska
