= Elim, Alaska =

Elim Neviarcaurluq (Central Yupik) Nivviaqhchauġluq (Inupiaq)
- City
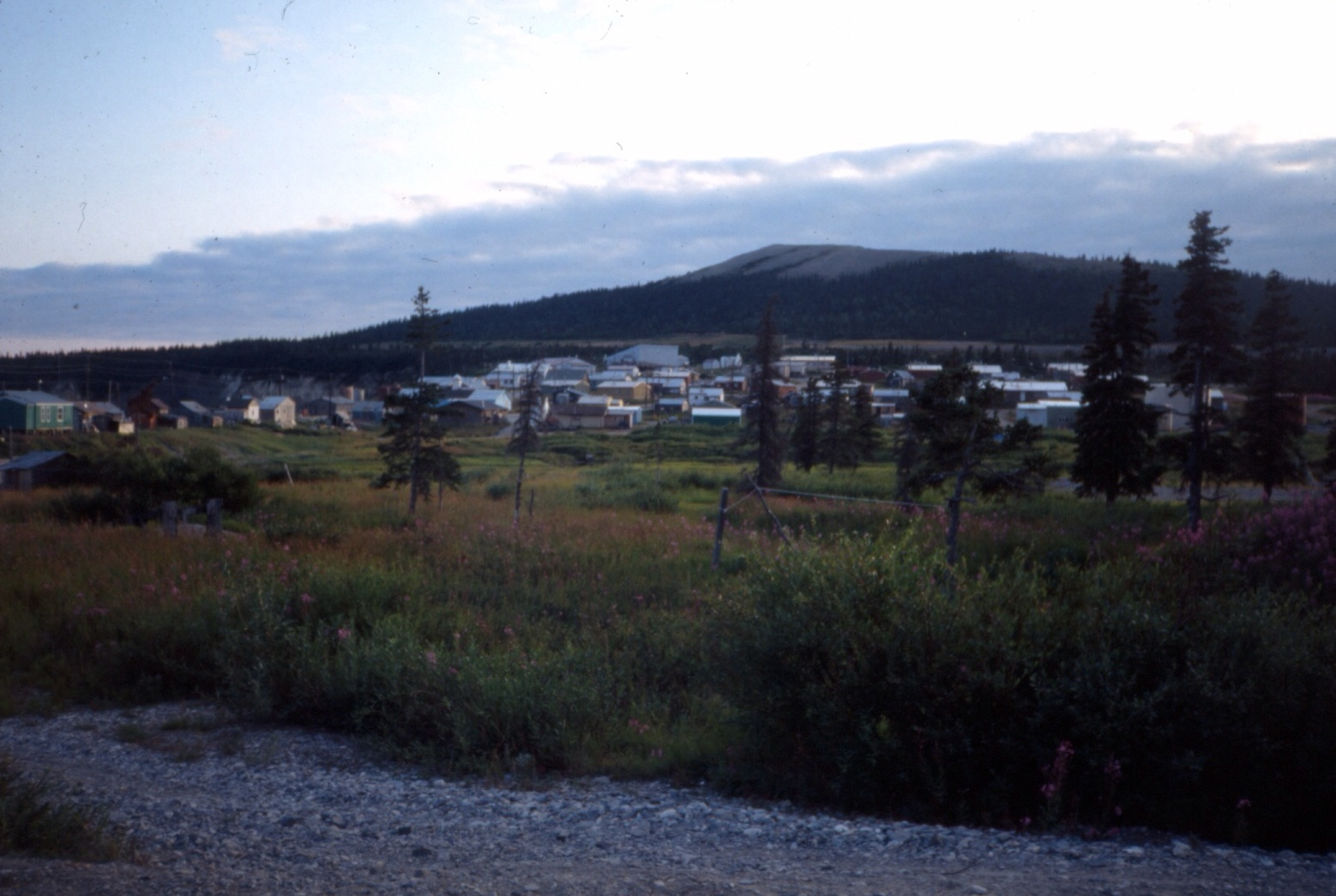
- View of Elim in August 1993

- Location in Alaska
- Coordinates: 64°37′4″N 162°15′24″W
- Country: United States
- State: Alaska
- Census Area: Nome
- Incorporated: October 17, 1970

Government
  - Mayor: Paul Nagurak.
  - State senator: Donald Olson (D)
  - State rep.: Neal Foster (D)

Area
  - Total: 2.66 sq mi (6.89 km^{2})
  - Land: 2.66 sq mi (6.89 km^{2})
  - Water: 0 sq mi (0.00 km^{2})
- Elevation: 36 ft (11 m)

Population (2020)
  - Total: 366
  - Density: 137.6/sq mi (53.14/km^{2})
- Time zone: UTC-9 (Alaska (AKST))
  - Summer (DST): UTC-8 (AKDT)
- ZIP code: 99739
- Area code: 907
- FIPS code: 02-22250
- GNIS feature ID: 1401788

Elim (Central Yupik: Neviarcaurluq; Inupiaq: Nivviaqhchauġluq) is a city in Nome Census Area, Alaska, United States. As of the 2020 census, Elim had a population of 366.

== Geography and climate ==
Elim is located at 64°37′4″N 162°15′24″W (64.617734, -162.256705).

According to the United States Census Bureau, the city has a total area of 2.4 square miles (6.2 km^{2}), all of it land.

Elim has a subarctic climate (Köppen Dfc). Winters are cold and long, and summers are warm and short.

Climate data for Moses Point Airport, Alaska
Month	Jan	Feb	Mar	Apr	May	Jun	Jul	Aug	Sep	Oct	Nov	Dec	Year
Record high °F (°C)	42 (6)	45 (7)	44 (7)	49 (9)	75 (24)	87 (31)	84 (29)	80 (27)	69 (21)	59 (15)	39 (4)	36 (2)	87 (31)
Mean maximum °F (°C)	31.5 (−0.3)	29.4 (−1.4)	33.0 (0.6)	41.0 (5.0)	62.4 (16.9)	73.8 (23.2)	75.8 (24.3)	69.5 (20.8)	59.1 (15.1)	45.6 (7.6)	33.9 (1.1)	30.1 (−1.1)	79.3 (26.3)
Mean daily maximum °F (°C)	8.8 (−12.9)	8.0 (−13.3)	14.7 (−9.6)	26.2 (−3.2)	43.5 (6.4)	57.6 (14.2)	61.2 (16.2)	57.9 (14.4)	49.0 (9.4)	31.7 (−0.2)	19.2 (−7.1)	6.0 (−14.4)	32.0 (0.0)
Daily mean °F (°C)	1.7 (−16.8)	0.8 (−17.3)	6.1 (−14.4)	18.1 (−7.7)	36.3 (2.4)	50.0 (10.0)	54.1 (12.3)	51.9 (11.1)	42.9 (6.1)	26.1 (−3.3)	13.1 (−10.5)	−0.6 (−18.1)	25.0 (−3.9)
Mean daily minimum °F (°C)	−5.4 (−20.8)	−6.5 (−21.4)	−2.4 (−19.1)	10.1 (−12.2)	29.1 (−1.6)	42.4 (5.8)	47.1 (8.4)	46.0 (7.8)	36.8 (2.7)	20.5 (−6.4)	7.0 (−13.9)	−7.2 (−21.8)	18.1 (−7.7)
Mean minimum °F (°C)	−36.0 (−37.8)	−34.9 (−37.2)	−29.2 (−34.0)	−18.6 (−28.1)	11.1 (−11.6)	33.1 (0.6)	37.6 (3.1)	33.6 (0.9)	22.9 (−5.1)	1.6 (−16.9)	−18.5 (−28.1)	−34.0 (−36.7)	−42.5 (−41.4)
Record low °F (°C)	−48 (−44)	−49 (−45)	−43 (−42)	−39 (−39)	−7 (−22)	26 (−3)	32 (0)	28 (−2)	16 (−9)	−14 (−26)	−42 (−41)	−54 (−48)	−54 (−48)
Average precipitation inches (mm)	1.15 (29)	0.92 (23)	1.07 (27)	0.91 (23)	0.59 (15)	0.73 (19)	1.85 (47)	4.20 (107)	3.07 (78)	1.21 (31)	1.51 (38)	1.04 (26)	18.26 (464)
Average snowfall inches (cm)	10.1 (26)	9.2 (23)	10.3 (26)	7.4 (19)	0.8 (2.0)	0.0 (0.0)	0.0 (0.0)	0.0 (0.0)	0.3 (0.76)	4.8 (12)	13.1 (33)	9.8 (25)	65.8 (167)
Source: WRCC

== Natural history ==
A number of flora and fauna are found in the Elim area. This is the westernmost location for the range of Black Spruce, Picea mariana.

== Demographics ==
Historical population
Census	Pop.	Note	%±
1920	162		—
1930	97		−40.1%
1940	100		3.1%
1950	154		54.0%
1960	145		−5.8%
1970	174		20.0%
1980	211		21.3%
1990	264		25.1%
2000	313		18.6%
2010	330		5.4%
2020	366		10.9%
U.S. Decennial Census

Elim first appeared on the 1920 U.S. Census as an unincorporated village. It was formally incorporated in 1970.

=== 2020 census ===
As of the 2020 census, Elim had a population of 366. The median age was 27.1 years. 37.2% of residents were under the age of 18 and 5.5% of residents were 65 years of age or older. For every 100 females there were 117.9 males, and for every 100 females age 18 and over there were 130.0 males age 18 and over.

0.0% of residents lived in urban areas, while 100.0% lived in rural areas.

There were 95 households in Elim, of which 55.8% had children under the age of 18 living in them. Of all households, 50.5% were married-couple households, 26.3% were households with a male householder and no spouse or partner present, and 17.9% were households with a female householder and no spouse or partner present. About 19.0% of all households were made up of individuals and 4.3% had someone living alone who was 65 years of age or older.

There were 109 housing units, of which 12.8% were vacant. The homeowner vacancy rate was 0.0% and the rental vacancy rate was 2.1%.

Racial composition as of the 2020 census
Race	Number	Percent
White	18	4.9%
Black or African American	0	0.0%
American Indian and Alaska Native	325	88.8%
Asian	2	0.5%
Native Hawaiian and Other Pacific Islander	0	0.0%
Some other race	2	0.5%
Two or more races	19	5.2%
Hispanic or Latino (of any race)	5	1.4%

=== 2000 census ===
As of the census of 2000, there were 313 people, 84 households, and 69 families residing in the city. The population density was 128.9 inhabitants per square mile (49.8/km^{2}). There were 106 housing units at an average density of 43.7 per square mile (16.9/km^{2}). The racial makeup of the city was 5.11% White, 92.65% Native American, and 2.24% from two or more races.

Of the 84 households, 60.7% had children under the age of 18 living with them, 57.1% were married couples living together, 15.5% had a female householder with no husband present, and 16.7% were non-families. 14.3% of all households were made up of individuals, and 2.4% had someone living alone who was 65 years of age or older. The average household size was 3.73 and the average family size was 4.16.

In the city, the age distribution of the population shows 41.9% under the age of 18, 10.5% from 18 to 24, 26.2% from 25 to 44, 14.7% from 45 to 64, and 6.7% who were 65 years of age or older. The median age was 24 years. For every 100 females, there were 131.9 males. For every 100 females age 18 and over, there were 122.0 males.

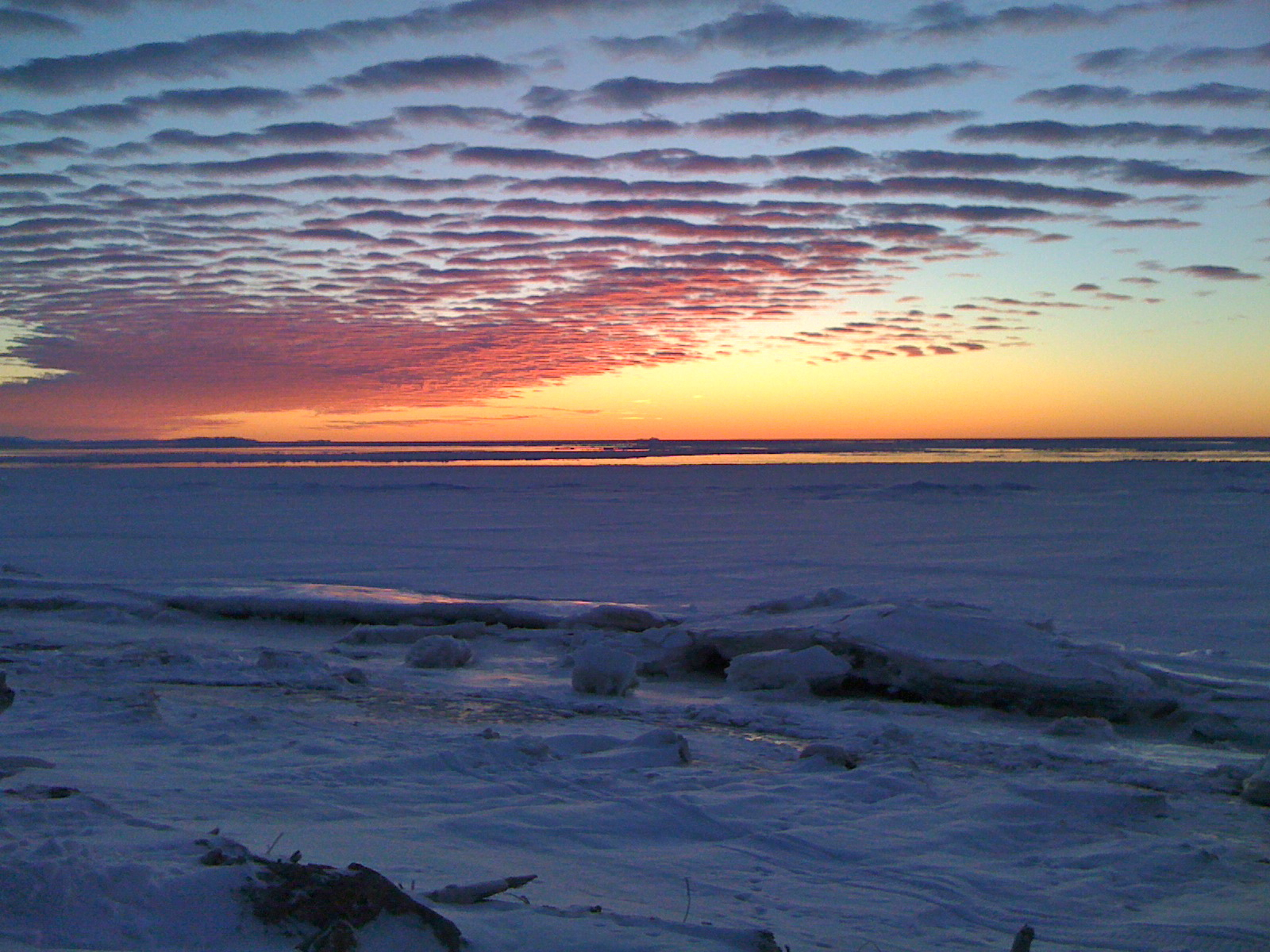
Sunrise of Elim, Alaska

The median income for a household in the city was $40,179, and the median income for a family was $40,893. Males had a median income of $25,938 versus $21,250 for females. The per capita income for the city was $10,300. About 8.0% of families and 7.9% of the population were below the poverty line, including 7.3% of those under age 18 and 12.5% of those age 65 or over.

== Transportation ==
=== Airports ===
The Elim Airport is a state-owned airport with scheduled passenger flights. Also located in Elim is the Moses Point Airport, which is privately owned by the Elim Native Corporation.

== Education ==
Elim is served by the Bering Strait School District. Aniguiin School serves grades Pre-K through 12.

== Boulder Creek uranium mine controversy ==
In 2005, mining company Full Metal Minerals announced a partnership with Triex Minerals Corporation to develop a uranium deposit north of Elim. Development of the site began with survey and exploration work in Sept 2005. Initial drilling exploration was completed in July 2006, confirming deposits of "sandstone-hosted uranium" at the Boulder Creek site in Death Valley, north of Elim.

The Boulder Creek mine site is located on part of the Tubutulik River. Serious water and air pollution risks, including radioactive byproducts, have been identified with "in-situ leeching", the type of uranium mining proposed for the site. Villagers have raised concerns that radioactive by-products of uranium mining would adversely affect the plants, fish, and wildlife on which they rely. In September 2007, Irene Murray of Aniguiin High School in Elim wrote an open letter to Alaska Gov. Sarah Palin, drawing attention to projected impacts on the local environment and human health. Protests led by Elim Students Against Uranium (ESAU) have included demonstrations in 2008 and 2009 at the Iditarod Trail Sled Dog Race ceremonial start, and on the Iditarod trail in Elim.

The village has raised legal concerns over the project that include an alleged failure by the federal Bureau of Land Management to provide adequate public notice and public comment periods regarding the Boulder Creek mine project. Portions of the regulatory process are under the purview of the Nuclear Regulatory Commission.
