= Merle K. (Mudhole) Smith Airport =

Airport in Alaska, United States

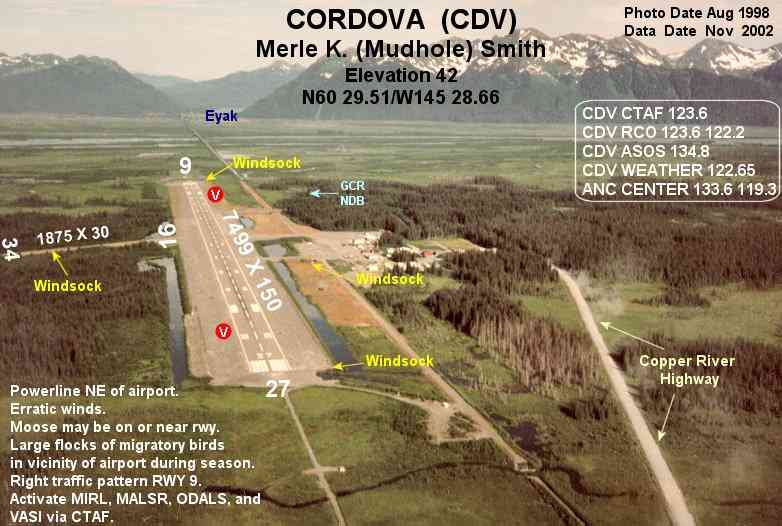
- IATA: CDV; ICAO: PACV; FAA LID: CDV

Summary
- Airport type: Public
- Owner: State of Alaska DOT&PF - Northern Region
- Serves: Cordova, Alaska
- Elevation AMSL: 54 ft (16 m)
- Coordinates: 60°29′30″N 145°28′39″W

Map
- Location of airport in Alaska

Runways
Direction	Length		Surface
Direction	ft	m	Surface
9/27	7,500	2,286	Asphalt
16/34	1,899	579	Gravel

Statistics (2016)
- Aircraft operations: 13,605
- Based aircraft: 29
- Passengers: 36,860
- Freight: 3,467,000 lbs
- Source: Federal Aviation Administration

Merle K. (Mudhole) Smith Airport (IATA: CDV, ICAO: PACV, FAA LID: CDV) is a state-owned public-use airport located 11 nautical miles (13 mi, 20 km) southeast of the central business district of Cordova, a city in the Chugach Census Area of the U.S. state of Alaska which has no road access to the outside world. Airline service is subsidized by the Essential Air Service program.

As per Federal Aviation Administration records, the airport had 16,640 passenger boardings (enplanements) in calendar year 2008, 15,372 enplanements in 2009, and 17,856 in 2010. It is included in the National Plan of Integrated Airport Systems for 2015–2019, which categorized it as a primary commercial service (nonhub) airport (more than 10,000 enplanements per year) based on 16,061 enplanements in 2012. The airport is named after Merle K. Smith, also known as "Mudhole", a pilot who in 1939 became president of Cordova Airlines, which used the airport as a hub between 1934 and 1968. Cordova Airlines was acquired by Alaska Airlines in 1968.

== Facilities and aircraft ==
Merle K. (Mudhole) Smith Airport covers an area of 2,959 acres (1,197 ha) at an elevation of 54 feet (16 m) above mean sea level. It has two runways: 9/27 is 7,500 by 150 feet (2,286 x 46 m) with an asphalt surface; 16/34 is 1,899 by 30 feet (579 x 9 m) with a gravel surface.

For the 12-month period ending January 1, 2011, the airport had 14,040 aircraft operations, an average of 38 per day: 46% general aviation, 29% air taxi, 18% scheduled commercial, and 7% military. At that time there were 30 aircraft based at this airport: 93% single-engine and 7% helicopter.

Alaska Airlines operates Boeing 737 jets to the airport, the largest airplanes flying to Cordova. Alaska is the only jet aircraft operator to the airport.

== Airline and destinations ==
=== Passenger ===
Airlines	Destinations
Alaska Airlines	Anchorage, Yakutat

=== Cargo ===
Airlines	Destinations
Alaska Central Express	Anchorage, Yakutat

=== Statistics ===
Top airlines at CDV (July 2023 - June 2024)
Rank	Airline	Passengers	Percent of market share
1	Alaska Airlines	35,950	100.00%

Top domestic destinations: July 2023 – June 2024
Rank	City	Airport	Passengers	Carriers
1	Anchorage	Ted Stevens Anchorage International Airport	14,680	Alaska
2	Seattle/Tacoma, WA	Seattle–Tacoma International Airport	2,370	
3	Juneau, Alaska	Juneau International Airport	1,080	
4	Yakutat, Alaska	Yakutat Airport	150	Alaska

== See also ==
- List of airports in Alaska

== Other sources ==
- Essential Air Service documents (Docket OST-1998-4899) from the U.S. Department of Transportation:
  - Order 2004-5-5 (May 4, 2004): tentatively reselects Alaska Airlines, Inc., to provide subsidized essential air service at Cordova, Gustavus, Petersburg, Wrangell, and Yakutat (southeast) Alaska, for the period from October 1, 2003, through April 30, 2006, at an annual rate of $5,723,008.
  - Order 2006-3-20 (March 22, 2006): re-selecting Alaska Airlines, Inc., to provide subsidized essential air service at Cordova, Gustavus, Petersburg, Wrangell, and Yakutat (southeast) Alaska, for the period from May 1, 2006, through April 30, 2009.
  - Order 2009-2-3 (February 9, 2009): re-selecting Alaska Airlines, Inc., to provide essential air service (EAS) at Cordova, Gustavus, and Yakutat, for an annual subsidy rate of $5,793,201 and at Petersburg and Wrangell at an annual subsidy rate of $1,347,195, through April 30, 2011.
  - Order 2011-2-1 (February 1, 2011): re-selecting Alaska Airlines, Inc., to provide essential air service (EAS) at Cordova, Gustavus, and Yakutat, for an annual subsidy rate of $4,486,951 and at Petersburg and Wrangell at an annual subsidy rate of $3,415,987, from May 1, 2011, through April 30, 2013.
  - Order 2013-2-10 (February 11, 2013): re-selecting Alaska Airlines, Inc., to provide Essential Air Service (EAS) at Cordova, Gustavus, and Yakutat, Alaska, for $4,827,052 annual subsidy and at Petersburg and Wrangell at an annual subsidy rate of $3,476,579, from May 1, 2013, through April 30, 2015.
