= Yakutat Airport =

Airport serving Yakutat, Alaska, United States

Yakutat Airport Yakutat Army Airfield
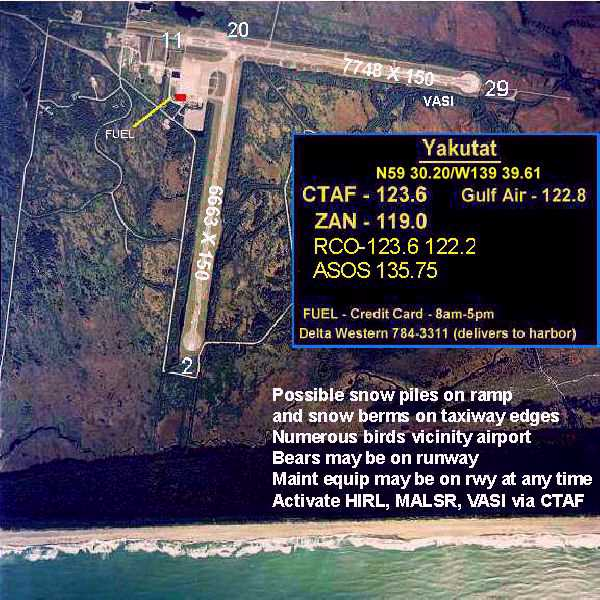
- IATA: YAK; ICAO: PAYA; FAA LID: YAK; WMO: 70361

Summary
- Airport type: Public
- Owner: State of Alaska DOT&PF - Southeast Region
- Serves: Yakutat, Alaska
- Elevation AMSL: 33 ft / 10 m
- Coordinates: 59°30′12″N 139°39′37″W

Map
- Location of airport in Alaska

Runways
Direction	Length		Surface
Direction	ft	m	Surface
2/20	6,475	1,974	Concrete
11/29	7,745	2,361	Asphalt

Statistics (2010)
- Aircraft operations: 19,026
- Based aircraft: 8
- Source: Federal Aviation Administration

Yakutat Airport (IATA: YAK, ICAO: PAYA, FAA LID: YAK) is a state-owned public-use airport located 3 nautical miles (6 km) southeast of the central business district of Yakutat, a city and borough in the U.S. state of Alaska which has no road access to the outside world. Airline service is subsidized by the Essential Air Service program.

As per Federal Aviation Administration records, the airport had 11,028 passenger boardings (enplanements) in calendar year 2008, 12,158 enplanements in 2009, and 10,035 in 2010. It is included in the National Plan of Integrated Airport Systems for 2015–2019, which categorized it as a primary commercial service (nonhub) airport (more than 10,000 enplanements per year) based on 10,100 enplanements in CY 2012.

== History ==
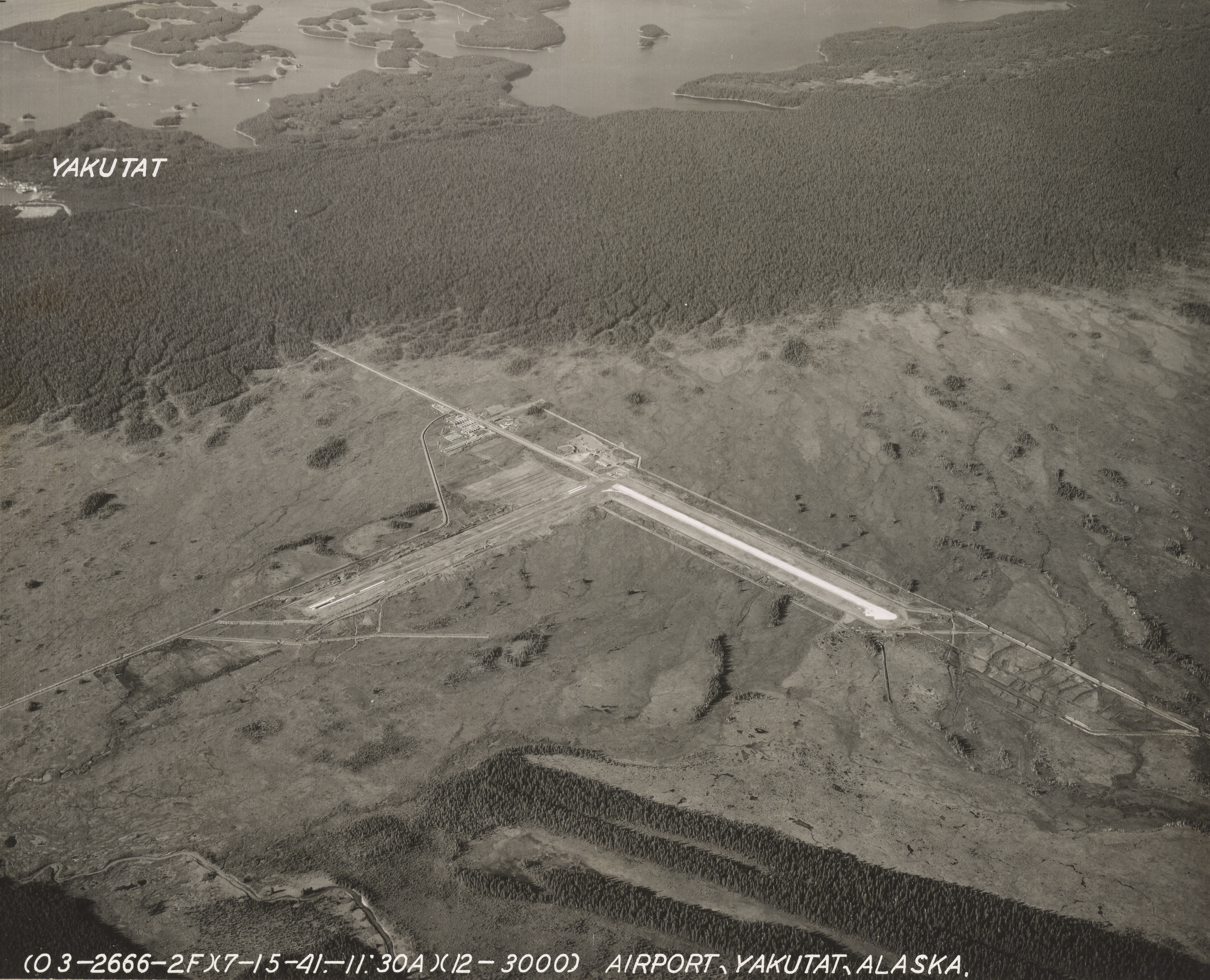
Aerial image, 1942

Yakutat Airport origins date from 1940 when Yakutat Army Airfield was constructed as part of the United States Army's long-range defense program for Alaska.

== Facilities and aircraft ==
Yakutat Airport has two runways: 2/20 is 6,475 by 150 feet (1,974 x 46 m) with a concrete surface; 11/29 is 7,745 by 150 feet (2,361 x 46 m) with an asphalt surface.

For the 12-month period ending May 3, 2010, the airport had 19,026 aircraft operations, an average of 52 per day: 68% general aviation, 26% air taxi, 4% scheduled commercial, and 2% military. At that time there were eight aircraft based at this airport, all single-engine.

== Airline and destinations ==
=== Top destinations ===
Busiest domestic routes out of YAK (July 2019 - June 2020)
Rank	City	Passengers	Carriers
1	Anchorage, AK	3,850	Alaska
2	Seattle/Tacoma, WA	3,210	Alaska
3	Juneau, AK	2,970	Alaska

== Incidents ==
- A Boeing 737-700, flying as Alaska Airlines Flight 66 from Cordova, hit a bear and narrowly missed another as it landed on November 15, 2020. The struck bear was killed, while the other bear as well as all onboard the aircraft were uninjured. The plane suffered damage to its left engine cowling.

== See also ==
- List of airports in Alaska

== Other sources ==
- Essential Air Service documents (Docket OST-1998-4899) from the U.S. Department of Transportation:
  - Order 2004-5-5 (May 4, 2004): tentatively reselects Alaska Airlines, Inc., to provide subsidized essential air service at Cordova, Gustavus, Petersburg, Wrangell, and Yakutat (southeast) Alaska, for the period from October 1, 2003, through April 30, 2006, at an annual rate of $5,723,008.
  - Order 2006-3-20 (March 22, 2006): re-selecting Alaska Airlines, Inc., to provide subsidized essential air service at Cordova, Gustavus, Petersburg, Wrangell, and Yakutat (southeast) Alaska, for the period from May 1, 2006, through April 30, 2009.
  - Order 2009-2-3 (February 9, 2009): re-selecting Alaska Airlines, Inc., to provide essential air service (EAS) at Cordova, Gustavus, and Yakutat, for an annual subsidy rate of $5,793,201 and at Petersburg and Wrangell at an annual subsidy rate of $1,347,195, through April 30, 2011.
  - Order 2011-2-1 (February 1, 2011): re-selecting Alaska Airlines, Inc., to provide essential air service (EAS) at Cordova, Gustavus, and Yakutat, for an annual subsidy rate of $4,486,951 and at Petersburg and Wrangell at an annual subsidy rate of $3,415,987, from May 1, 2011, through April 30, 2013.
  - Order 2013-2-10 (February 11, 2013): re-selecting Alaska Airlines, Inc., to provide Essential Air Service (EAS) at Cordova, Gustavus, and Yakutat, Alaska, for $4,827,052 annual subsidy and at Petersburg and Wrangell at an annual subsidy rate of $3,476,579, from May 1, 2013, through April 30, 2015.
