= Tanacross, Alaska =

Tanacross, Alaska Taats’altęy
- CDP
- Location of Tanacross, Alaska
- Coordinates: 63°22′34″N 143°21′25″W
- Country: United States
- State: Alaska
- Census Area: Southeast Fairbanks

Government
  - State senator: Click Bishop (R)
  - State rep.: Mike Cronk (R)

Area
  - Total: 80.73 sq mi (209.10 km^{2})
  - Land: 79.11 sq mi (204.89 km^{2})
  - Water: 1.63 sq mi (4.21 km^{2})

Population (2020)
  - Total: 144
  - Density: 1.8/sq mi (0.7/km^{2})
- Time zone: UTC-9 (Alaska (AKST))
  - Summer (DST): UTC-8 (AKDT)
- ZIP code: 99776
- Area code: 907
- FIPS code: 02-75050

Tanacross (Tanacross: Taats’altęy) is a census-designated place (CDP) in Southeast Fairbanks Census Area, Alaska, United States. As of the 2020 census, Tanacross had a population of 144. It hosts an air tanker base.

== History ==
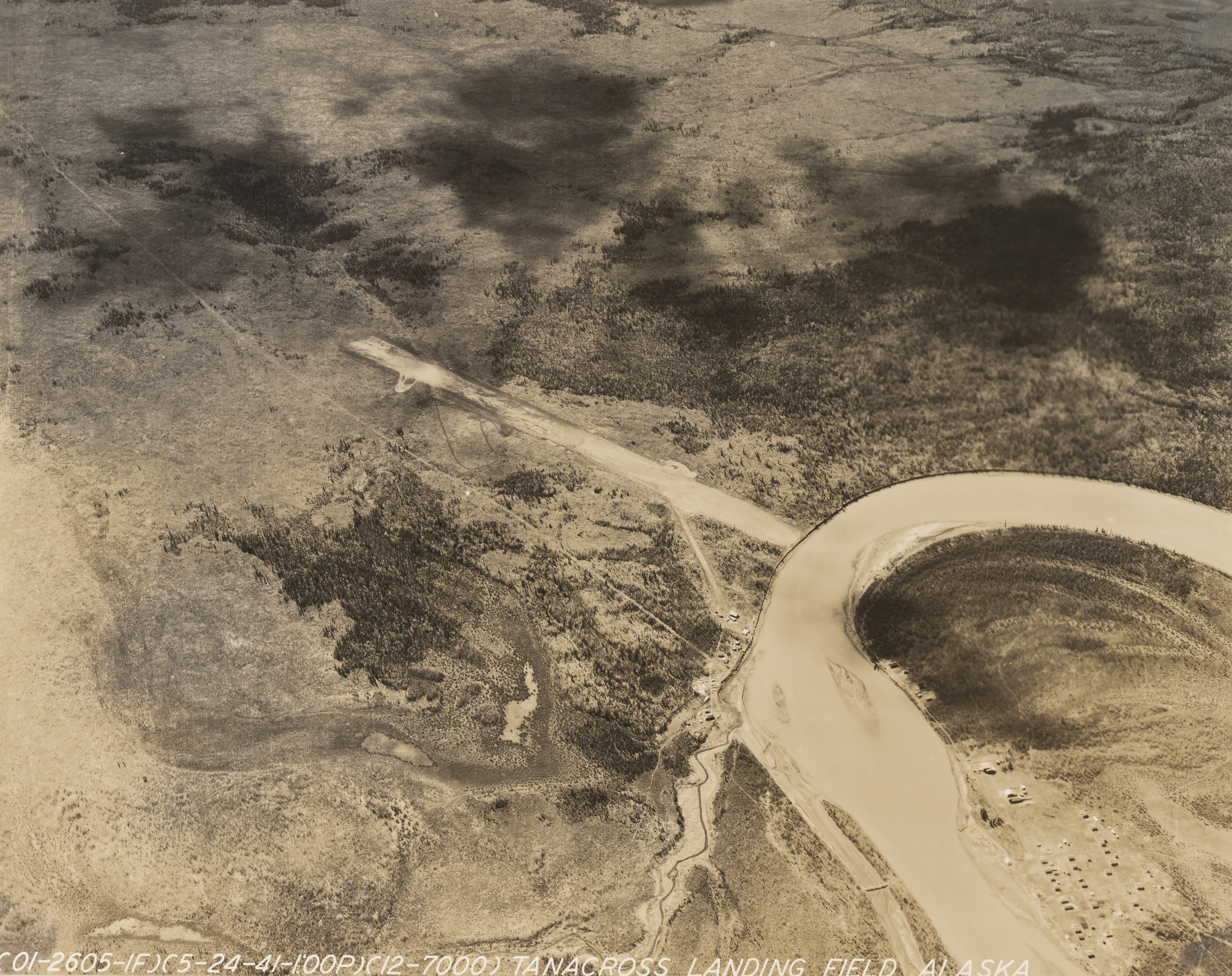
Tanacross airstrip, 1941

Tanacross, initially founded as a telegraph station called Tanana Crossing (also known as St. Timothy's). The name was shortened to Tanacross before 1940. The village was initially located on the north bank of the Tanana River. An airstrip was built on the south bank during the mid-1930s and upgraded for military use during World War II in 1941–42. Thousands of troops deployed through Tanacross during the period. The airfield was closed after the war. In 1972, the town itself relocated south across the river due to water contamination. In 1979, the old village burned due to an uncontrolled grass fire.

== Geography ==
Tanacross is located at 63°22′34″N 143°21′25″W (63.376206, -143.356991).

According to the United States Census Bureau, the CDP has a total area of 81.2 square miles (210 km^{2}), of which, 80.0 square miles (207 km^{2}) of it is land and 1.1 square miles (2.8 km^{2}) of it (1.38%) is water.

== Climate ==
Tanacross has a dry-winter continental subarctic climate (Köppen Dwc).

Climate data for Tanacross
Month	Jan	Feb	Mar	Apr	May	Jun	Jul	Aug	Sep	Oct	Nov	Dec	Year
Record high °F (°C)	43 (6)	44 (7)	52 (11)	70 (21)	82 (28)	91 (33)	90 (32)	90 (32)	78 (26)	62 (17)	40 (4)	45 (7)	91 (33)
Mean daily maximum °F (°C)	−5.1 (−20.6)	8 (−13)	23.5 (−4.7)	41.9 (5.5)	56.6 (13.7)	69.6 (20.9)	71.9 (22.2)	67.9 (19.9)	52.9 (11.6)	32.4 (0.2)	7.1 (−13.8)	−4.6 (−20.3)	35.2 (1.8)
Mean daily minimum °F (°C)	−25.8 (−32.1)	−16.7 (−27.1)	−8.6 (−22.6)	13.6 (−10.2)	29.4 (−1.4)	41.3 (5.2)	43.7 (6.5)	39 (4)	29 (−2)	12.5 (−10.8)	−11.5 (−24.2)	−22.9 (−30.5)	10.2 (−12.1)
Record low °F (°C)	−74 (−59)	−75 (−59)	−60 (−51)	−32 (−36)	0 (−18)	23 (−5)	25 (−4)	21 (−6)	−5 (−21)	−32 (−36)	−56 (−49)	−70 (−57)	−75 (−59)
Average precipitation inches (mm)	0.28 (7.1)	0.34 (8.6)	0.08 (2.0)	0.2 (5.1)	1.04 (26)	2.43 (62)	1.8 (46)	1.66 (42)	1.13 (29)	0.69 (18)	0.51 (13)	0.89 (23)	11.05 (281)
Average snowfall inches (cm)	3.3 (8.4)	3.7 (9.4)	1.5 (3.8)	2.4 (6.1)	0.8 (2.0)	0 (0)	0 (0)	0 (0)	1.4 (3.6)	7 (18)	4.7 (12)	8.2 (21)	33 (84)
Average precipitation days	3	3	1	2	5	9	9	8	6	6	4	4	60

== Demographics ==
Historical population
Census	Pop.	Note	%±
1920	101		—
1930	80		−20.8%
1940	135		68.8%
1950	137		1.5%
1960	102		−25.5%
1970	84		−17.6%
1980	117		39.3%
1990	106		−9.4%
2000	140		32.1%
2010	136		−2.9%
2020	144		5.9%
U.S. Decennial Census

Tanacross first appeared on the 1920 U.S. Census as the unincorporated village of "Tanana Crossing." In 1940, the name was combined to form "Tanacross." It was made a census-designated place (CDP) in 1980.

As of the census of 2000, there were 140 people, 42 households, and 28 families residing in the CDP. The population density was 1.7 inhabitants per square mile (0.66/km^{2}). There were 53 housing units at an average density of 0.7 per square mile (0.27/km^{2}). The racial makeup of the CDP was 8.57% White, 88.57% Native American, 1.43% from other races, and 1.43% from two or more races. 1.43% of the population were Hispanic or Latino of any race.

Of the 42 households, 33.3% had children under the age of 18 living with them, 40.5% were married couples living together, 11.9% had a female householder with no husband present, and 31.0% were non-families. 28.6% of all households were made up of individuals, and none had someone living alone who was 65 years of age or older. The average household size was 3.33 and the average family size was 3.93.

In the CDP, the age distribution of the population shows 30.7% under the age of 18, 10.7% from 18 to 24, 25.0% from 25 to 44, 27.1% from 45 to 64, and 6.4% who were 65 years of age or older. The median age was 33 years. For every 100 females, there were 112.1 males. For every 100 females age 18 and over, there were 110.9 males.

The median income for a household in the CDP was $22,083, and the median income for a family was $31,250. Males had a median income of $71,250 versus $24,583 for females. The per capita income for the CDP was $9,429. There were 22.6% of families and 33.3% of the population living below the poverty line, including 43.6% of under eighteens and none of those over 64.

== Education ==
Tanacross is part of the Alaska Gateway School District. Tanacross School, a K-8 campus, and serves community students.
