= Annette Island =

Island in Alaska, USA

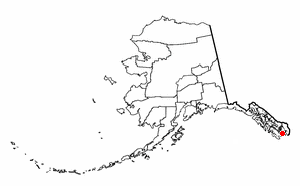
Annette Island location in southeast Alaska

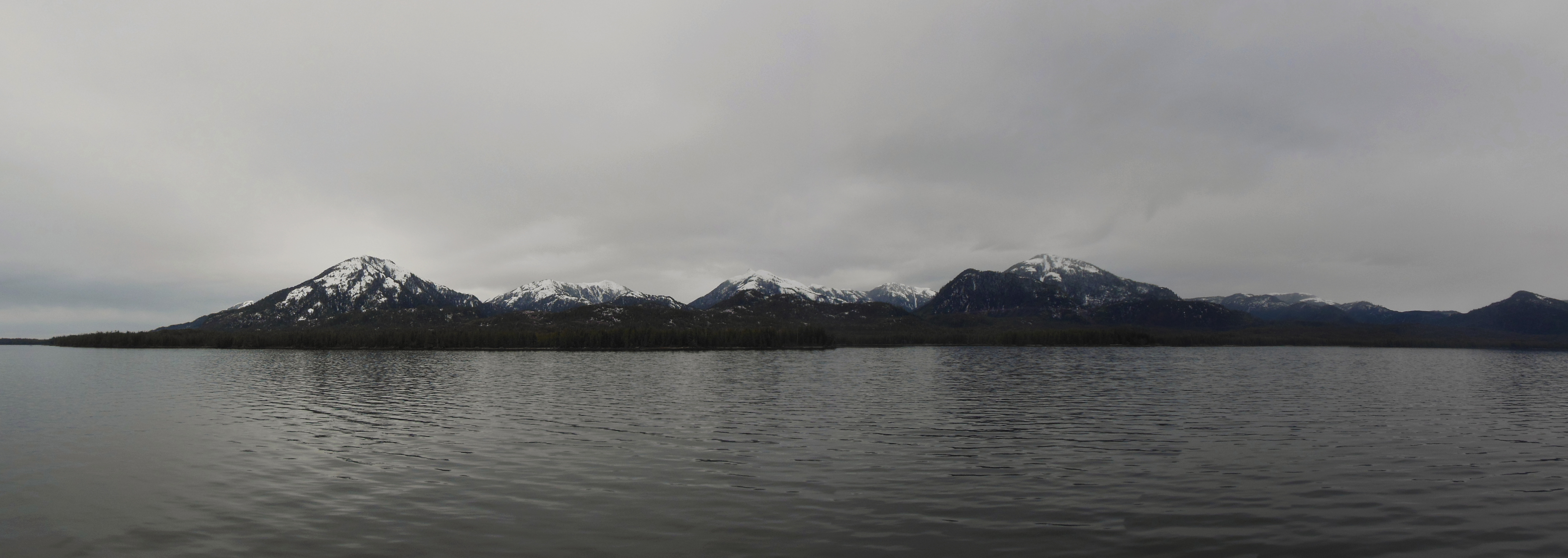
Annette Island Panorama

Annette Island or Tàakw.àani (Tlingit) is an island in the Gravina Islands of the Alexander Archipelago of the Pacific Ocean on the southeastern coast of the U.S. state of Alaska. It is at 55°08′06″N 131°27′21″W. It is about 18 km (11 mi) long and about 18 km (11 mi) wide. The land area is 332.573 km^{2} (128.407 sq mi). Annette Island is located west across the Revillagigedo Channel from the Alaska mainland and south of Revillagigedo Island. The Island was named in 1879 by William Healey Dall, an American naturalist and explorer in Alaska, in honor of his wife Annette Whitney Dall.

The meaning of the Tlingit name for the island is Winter Town. Since the late 19th century, it has been the base of the Annette Island Reserve of the Metlakatla Alaska Native Community, composed mostly of Tsimshian people. This is the only Indian reservation in Alaska as Metlakatla voted to opt out of giving up their lands under the Alaska Native Claims Settlement Act of the 1970s. In 2016 they elected Audrey Hudson as their first Tribal Chairwoman.

== Community and demographics ==
The largest settlement on the island is Metlakatla. The federally recognized Metlakatla Indian Community was founded by an unordained Anglican missionary, William Duncan, and Tsimshian followers who moved with him from their community of Metlakatla in British Columbia after he developed new doctrine and schismatized from his church.

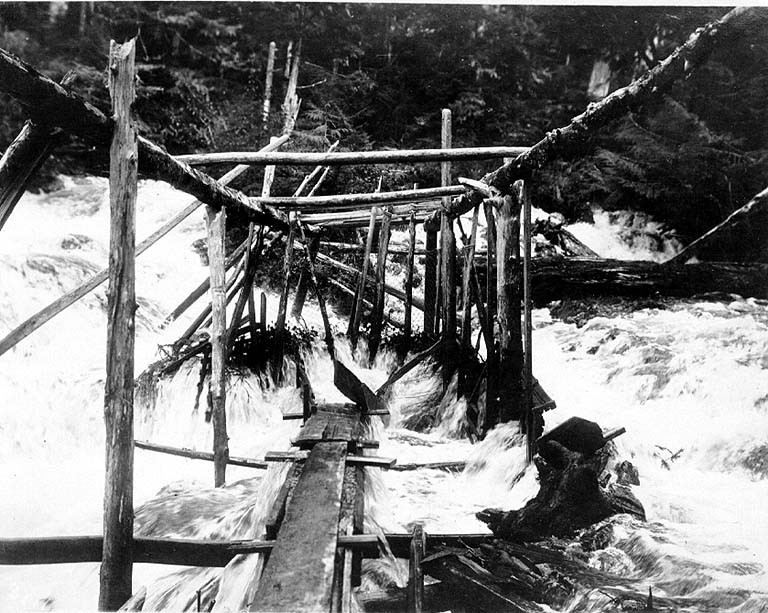
Fish trap on Tamgas Stream, Annette Island, July 1910

Since the late 19th century, the entire island has been an Indian reserve, a status enacted by Congress when the Tlingit agreed to let the Tsimshian use this territory.

== Government ==
The Tsimshian set up their government under the Indian Reorganization Act (1934), writing a constitution for electoral government. They have a twelve-person Council. "The mayor, secretary, and treasurer are elected by the general voting membership of the community. Each of these is elected for a two-year term. Council seats are staggered, resulting in the election of six Council seats each year and three executives every second year."

Since the late 1970s, this has been the only remaining reservation in Alaska, as the Metlakatla opted out of giving up their lands for payment under the Alaska Native Claims Settlement Act.

In 2016 its Tribal Chairwoman is Audrey Hudson, the first woman to be elected to this role. She also serves as mayor, city manager, and police commissioner of the Metlakatla Indian Community.

The island's population was 1,447 at the 2000 census. The island population is composed mainly of Tsimshian people. It is a cultural crossroads for Tlingit and Haida Natives as well.

== Infrastructure ==
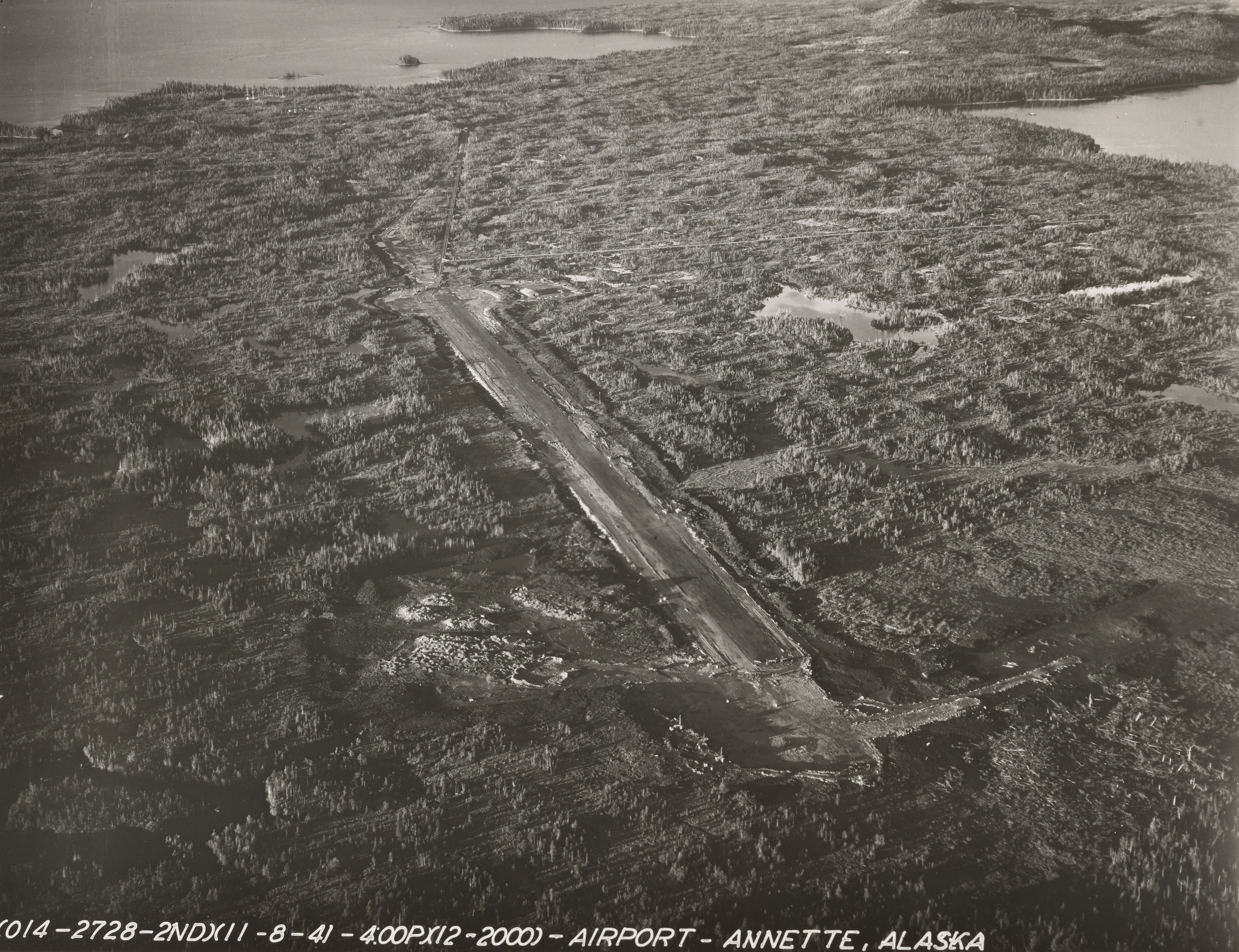
Annette Island Airfield, 1941

A network of unimproved roads and trails on the island were developed during years of logging. More than 50 years after the United States made a treaty with the Metlakatla Community that promised a cross-island road in exchange for their allowing construction and operation of an airfield on the island, it made good on its word. A joint armed forces task force constructed a 15-mile road across the island, completed from 1997 to 2007, which connected Metlakatla on the ocean side to the side facing Ketchikan, where a ferry landing has been built. This has not improved access by ferry to the mainland.

After the Second World War, the airfield was used as a United States Coast Guard Search and Rescue base. It served commercial aircraft as well until the 1970s, when the new Ketchikan Airport was built at Gravina Island in the Inside Passage.

== Climate ==
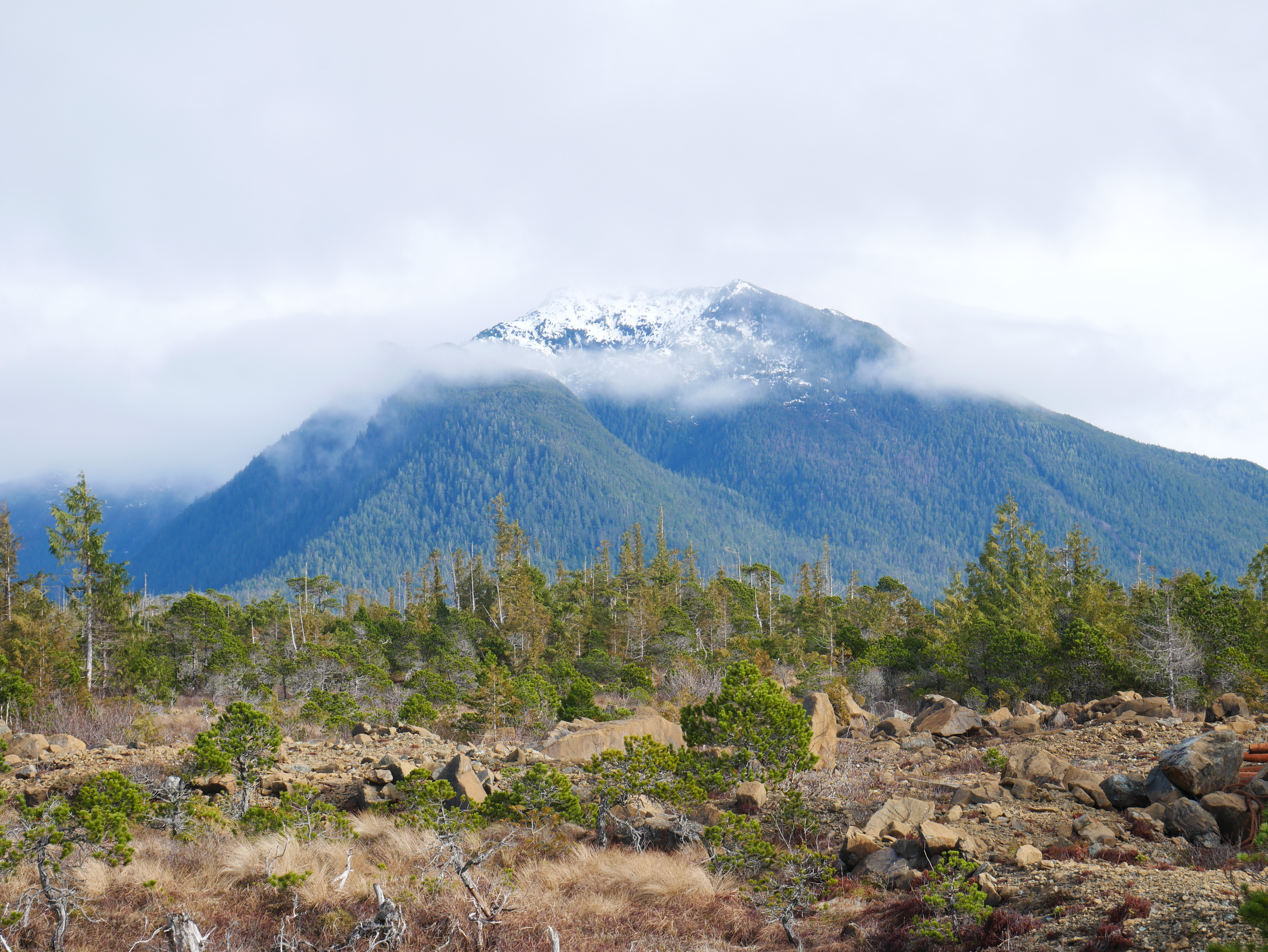
Annette Island landscape

The lower elevations of Annette Island have a Marine west coast climate (Köppen Cfb), with windy and wet weather year-round, cool winters, and mild summers, and straddle the border between USDA Plant Hardiness Zones 7 and 8. Due to its southerly and maritime location, with an annual mean temperature of 47.7 °F (8.7 °C), the Annette Island Airport is one of the warmest locations statewide. Precipitation falls on most days during the winter, and the seasonal total snowfall of 33.5 inches (85 cm) occurs mostly from November to March, with some accumulation during April. Snowfall in May and October is relatively rare; warm spells raise the high to 50 °F (10 °C) for several days each month. During summer, there is an average of 17 days with 70 °F (21 °C)+ highs, and rain still falls on around half of the days. Precipitation averages more than 103 inches (2.62 m) annually, with June and July being the driest months and October and November the wettest. Extreme temperatures have ranged from −4 °F (−20 °C) on January 30, 1947, up to 93 °F (34 °C) on June 19, 2004, with the temperature having fallen below 0 °F (−18 °C) only on a handful of occasions. In addition, the Annette Island Airport holds the Alaska state monthly record high temperatures for January (66 °F or 19 °C on January 14, 2017), April (82 °F or 28 °C on April 29, 1976), and November (67 °F or 19 °C on November 1, 1970).

Climate data for Annette Island Airport, Alaska, 1991–2020 normals, extremes 1941–2019
Month	Jan	Feb	Mar	Apr	May	Jun	Jul	Aug	Sep	Oct	Nov	Dec	Year
Record high °F (°C)	66 (19)	65 (18)	65 (18)	82 (28)	88 (31)	93 (34)	90 (32)	90 (32)	82 (28)	71 (22)	67 (19)	62 (17)	93 (34)
Mean maximum °F (°C)	51.6 (10.9)	51.9 (11.1)	53.5 (11.9)	64.0 (17.8)	71.2 (21.8)	77.5 (25.3)	77.8 (25.4)	78.3 (25.7)	69.2 (20.7)	60.2 (15.7)	53.3 (11.8)	50.7 (10.4)	82.0 (27.8)
Mean daily maximum °F (°C)	42.9 (6.1)	44.1 (6.7)	46.0 (7.8)	51.8 (11.0)	58.6 (14.8)	62.9 (17.2)	65.9 (18.8)	66.3 (19.1)	61.1 (16.2)	53.6 (12.0)	46.8 (8.2)	43.1 (6.2)	53.6 (12.0)
Daily mean °F (°C)	37.7 (3.2)	38.3 (3.5)	40.1 (4.5)	45.4 (7.4)	51.7 (10.9)	56.4 (13.6)	59.7 (15.4)	60.0 (15.6)	55.1 (12.8)	47.9 (8.8)	41.7 (5.4)	38.3 (3.5)	47.7 (8.7)
Mean daily minimum °F (°C)	32.5 (0.3)	32.6 (0.3)	34.1 (1.2)	38.9 (3.8)	44.8 (7.1)	49.9 (9.9)	53.5 (11.9)	53.8 (12.1)	49.1 (9.5)	42.3 (5.7)	36.5 (2.5)	33.5 (0.8)	41.8 (5.4)
Mean minimum °F (°C)	16.8 (−8.4)	19.9 (−6.7)	24.1 (−4.4)	30.7 (−0.7)	36.3 (2.4)	43.2 (6.2)	47.7 (8.7)	46.9 (8.3)	39.3 (4.1)	30.8 (−0.7)	23.2 (−4.9)	18.4 (−7.6)	10.0 (−12.2)
Record low °F (°C)	−4 (−20)	2 (−17)	1 (−17)	21 (−6)	30 (−1)	37 (3)	40 (4)	40 (4)	30 (−1)	18 (−8)	−3 (−19)	1 (−17)	−4 (−20)
Average precipitation inches (mm)	10.43 (265)	7.71 (196)	7.88 (200)	7.18 (182)	5.55 (141)	5.09 (129)	5.17 (131)	7.92 (201)	10.16 (258)	12.87 (327)	12.55 (319)	11.00 (279)	103.51 (2,628)
Average snowfall inches (cm)	7.0 (18)	7.3 (19)	7.8 (20)	1.0 (2.5)	0.0 (0.0)	0.0 (0.0)	0.0 (0.0)	0.0 (0.0)	0.0 (0.0)	0.0 (0.0)	3.6 (9.1)	8.1 (21)	34.8 (89.6)
Average precipitation days (≥ 0.01 in)	21.9	17.9	22.0	19.1	15.3	15.5	15.4	15.8	19.5	22.5	23.3	23.2	231.4
Average snowy days (≥ 0.1 in)	4.7	4.2	5.4	1.4	0.1	0.0	0.0	0.0	0.0	0.0	2.9	4.9	23.6
Average relative humidity (%)	77.1	78.1	75.4	75.4	74.9	77.0	78.6	80.8	81.6	81.5	79.1	78.8	78.2
Average dew point °F (°C)	27.0 (−2.8)	30.6 (−0.8)	30.6 (−0.8)	34.3 (1.3)	39.7 (4.3)	45.7 (7.6)	50.2 (10.1)	51.3 (10.7)	47.7 (8.7)	40.8 (4.9)	33.3 (0.7)	29.1 (−1.6)	38.4 (3.5)
Mean monthly sunshine hours	49.6	70.6	105.4	147.0	186.0	162.0	148.8	145.7	108.0	68.2	51.0	34.1	1,276.4
Mean daily sunshine hours	1.6	2.5	3.4	4.9	6.0	5.4	4.8	4.7	3.6	2.2	1.7	1.1	3.5
Source 1: NOAA (humidity and dew point 1961–1990, mean maxima/minima 1981–2010)
Source 2: Deutscher Wetterdienst (sun 1961–1990)

== Demographics of the village of Annette ==
Historical population
Census	Pop.	Note	%±
1950	302		—
1960	337		11.6%
1970	195		−42.1%
1980	139		−28.7%
1990	43		−69.1%
U.S. Decennial Census

Annette first appeared on the 1950 U.S. Census as an unincorporated village. In 1980, it was made a census-designated place (CDP). It last returned in 1990 and was dissolved as a CDP effective as of the 2000 census.
