= MS Torrens =

Cargo motor ship

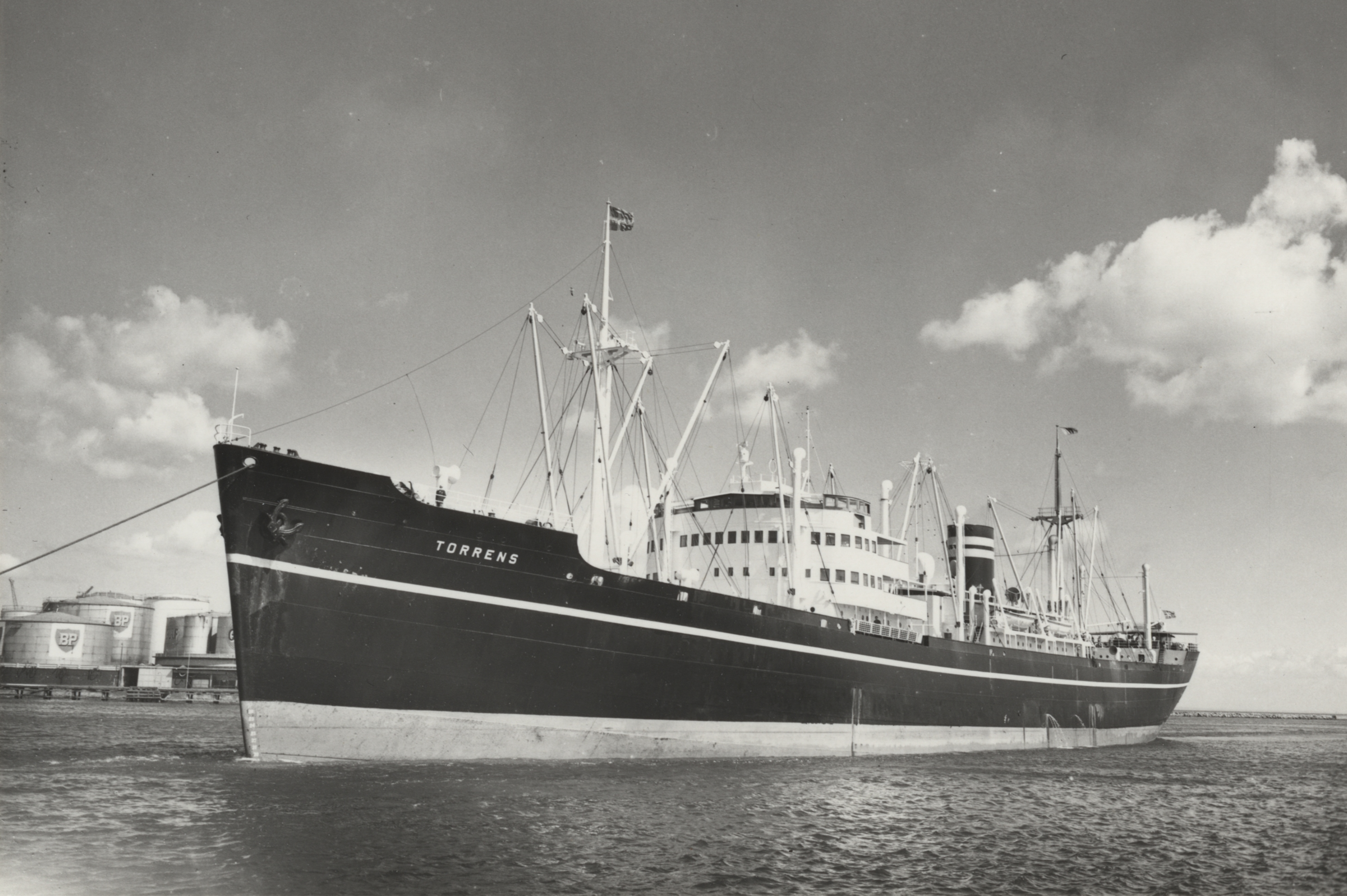
- Torrens at Copenhagen, 1960

History

(Norway)
- Name: Torrens (1939-1966); Georgios M (1966-1970) (Greece)
- Owner: Wilhelm Wilhelmsen, Tønsberg, Norway (1939-1966); Dimitra Cia. Nav. S. A., Piraeus, Greece (1966-1970)
- Operator: Wilhelm Wilhelmsen, Tønsberg, Norway (1939-1940); Norwegian Shipping and Trade Mission (1940-1942); U.S. War Shipping Administration (1942-1946); Norwegian Shipping and Trade Mission (1946); Wilhelm Wilhelmsen (1946-1966); Dimitra Cia. Nav. S. A., Piraeus, Greece (1966-1970)
- Builder: Kockums Mek.Verksted AB., Malmö, Sweden
- Yard number: 209
- Launched: 5 April 1939
- Acquired: Delivered 31 May 1939
- In service: 1939
- Out of service: 1970
- Identification: Signal: LKFA
- Fate: Scrapped China 1970
- Notes: Ownership and registry remained unchanged during wartime operation by Norwegian Shipping and Trade Mission and U.S. War Shipping Administration. (Lloyd's 1940-1945)

General characteristics
- Tonnage: 6,692 GRT, 4,000 NRT, 10,300 DWT
- Length: 498.6 ft (152.0 m) (LOA); 479.1 ft (146.0 m) (Registry)
- Beam: 62.3 ft (19.0 m)
- Draught: 27 ft 7.75 in (8.4 m)
- Depth: 28.8 ft (8.8 m); 31 ft 7 in (9.6 m) (molded)
- Propulsion: 2 X M.A.N. BHK 9700 diesel engines 11,600 i.h.p., 2,722 n.h.p.; 2 X screws
- Speed: 17 kn (20 mph; 31 km/h); Range: 21,420 nmi (24,650 mi; 39,670 km)
- Notes: Wartime armament: 76 mm (3.0 in) cannon forward; 10 cm (3.9 in) cannon aft; 20 mm Oerlikon (multiple)

MS Torrens was a Norwegian cargo motor ship built in 1939 by Kockums Mek.Verksted AB., Malmö, Sweden, for Wilhelm Wilhelmsen, Tønsberg, Norway. In 1940, after the German invasion of Norway, the ship operated for the Norwegian Shipping and Trade Mission (Nortraship) in London. Voyages in early 1940 involved U.S. Atlantic ports and the Philippines, China and Japan. By mid 1940 the operations tended to be out of U.S. Pacific coast ports, with occasional visits to the Atlantic, to the same destinations. The same pattern repeated in 1941.

With entry of the United States into the war Torrens was transferred to the U.S. War Shipping Administration (WSA) on 23 January 1942. The ship was allocated to Army requirements until 22 January 1946. The ship first operated as a cargo ship but was converted into a troop ship with a capacity for 1,702 passengers. Until June 1945 Torrens operated in the Southwest Pacific theater. After June 1945 the ship operated to Europe until January 1946 when released from troop transport service and returned to Nortraship on 22 January 1946.

After return to owners the ship was eventually sold in 1966 to a firm in Piraeus, Greece and renamed Georgios M. The ship was sold to Chinese breakers in 1970 and scrapped in April of that year.

== Construction and characteristics ==
Torrens was built by Kockums Mek.Verksted AB., Malmö, Sweden, as yard number 209 for the Norwegian shipping company Wilhelm Wilhelmsen, Tønsberg, Norway. The ship was launched 5 April 1939 and delivered to the owner on 31 May 1939. The ship was registered at Tønsberg, signal LKFA, as a twin screw motor ship of 6,692 GRT, 4,000 NRT, 10,300 DWT. Registered dimensions were 479.1 ft (146.0 m) registry length, 62.3 ft (19.0 m) beam and 28.8 ft (8.8 m) depth, 31 ft 7 in (9.6 m) molded depth and 27 ft 7.75 in (8.4 m) draught. Length overall was 498.6 ft (152.0 m). Two 7-cylinder M.A.N. BHK 9700 SCDA diesel engines of 11,600 i.h.p., 2,722 n.h.p., drove twin screws for a speed of 17 kn (20 mph; 31 km/h). (Note: Bakgrunn shows 16 kn (18 mph; 30 km/h) and others up to 18 kn (21 mph; 33 km/h). 17 kn (20 mph; 31 km/h) is used in multiple references and probably a sound service speed.) The ship's range was 21,420 nmi (24,650 mi; 39,670 km).

== Service history ==
=== Background ===
Torrens was delivered to the owner on 31 May 1939 and Germany invaded Poland on 1 September 1939 then Norway on 9 April 1940. The ship thus had a very brief peacetime commercial service. Unlike vessels of occupied countries with no government in exile Norwegian ships that escaped the occupation were not subject to seizure of the belligerents and later by the United States. (Note: Denmark was such a case with 40 ships seized by the United States in 1941 after they sought refuge in neutral ports to avoid seizure by Britain and France. See MS Tunis and USAT Sicilien for fates of two Danish ships.) The Norwegian government in exile in London established the Norwegian Shipping and Trade Mission (Nortraship) and requisitioned all Norwegian ships to maintain the Norwegian flag at sea. Torrens operated under Nortraship until on 23 January 1942, with the United States entering the war, the ship was delivered by Nortraship to the War Shipping Administration.

=== Before Pacific War ===
The ship's schedule for 1940 shows continual voyages between U.S. Atlantic ports, with occasional visits to U.S. Pacific coast ports, and western Pacific Ports. Such a sequence is seen with the ship departing Manila on 28 February for New York arriving on 6 April. From New York on 17 April the ship put into Boston, back to New York, to Hampton Roads, Savannah then through the Panama Canal to Los Angeles and arriving back in Manila 9 June 1940. From June until return to Los Angeles on 20 August Torrens made trips between Manila, Shanghai, Hong Kong and Yokohama. The ship departed Los Angeles 21 August bound for the U.S. Atlantic coast ports of New York, Philadelphia and Hampton Roads before heading for Manila by way of Los Angeles. After an 18 October 1940 departure from Los Angeles Torrens repeated the western Pacific port calls arriving in Yokohama on New Year's Day 1941. On 3 January 1941 the ship again headed for New York by way of Los Angeles. The pattern was similar during 1941 until 4 December 1941 with the ship's arrival in Los Angeles from New York. The next voyage, departing Los Angeles on 7 February 1942 was a wartime voyage for Brisbane after Torrens was transferred from Nortraship to the War Shipping Administration (WSA) on 23 January at San Pedro, California.

=== War in the Pacific ===
==== Transfer to War Shipping Administration (WSA) ====
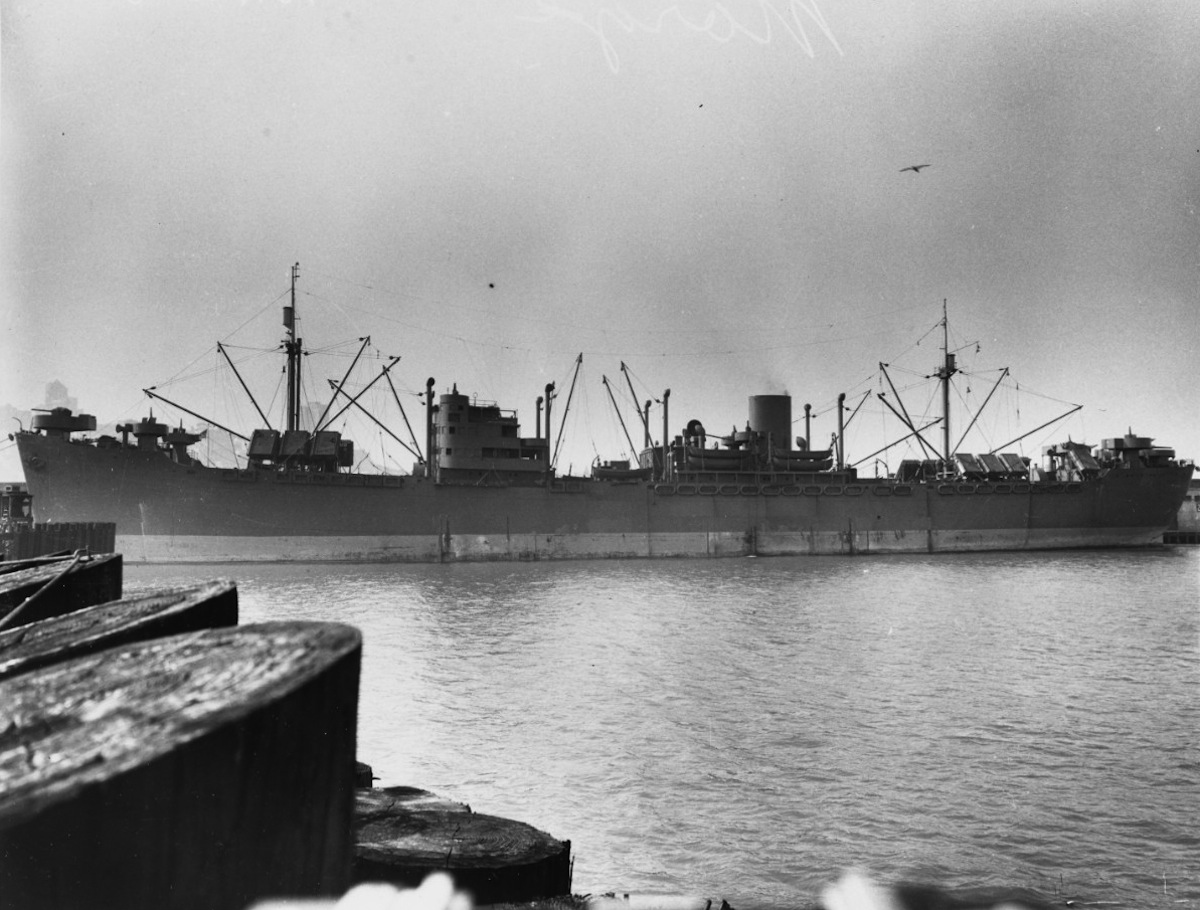
Torrens at San Francisco, California, 1943

Torrens was one of WSA's foreign registered vessels. Many had been seized while others with friendly governments in exile were cooperatively incorporated into the effort, including operation of the ship by the ship's normal crew or other nationals. (Note: Lloyd's Register throughout the war years shows no change in flag, ownership or port of registration. Seized vessels were usually registered in Panama. Torrens and some other Norwegian vessels apparently retained their national registry and ownership via the Norwegian Government in Exile. Contrast Lloyd's Register 1941-42 for the seized Danish ship that operated as USAT Sicilien where the Danish owner and registry is stricken.) Torrens was placed in operation under a U.S. Army Transportation Corps Agreement (TCA) and management by WSA agents; from 23 January 1941 to 17 October 1944 by Barber Steamship Lines, Inc. and from then until 22 January 1946 and release to Nortraship by American West African Line.

A description of the ship's company is given by members of the Fifth Special Naval Construction Battalion, elements of which embarked at Port Hueneme, California on 26 October 1944, for Milne Bay. The ship's company was "cosmopolitan" under the ship's peace time Captain, Thor Bruu, who held a commission in the Royal Norwegian Naval Reserve and held command from 30 May 1930 to 20 October 1945. The ship's officers and gun crews were regular Norwegian Navy or Naval Reserve. (Note: Norwegian references, some here, use the abbreviation "SSH" regarding gun crews. The full title is Sjøforsvarets skytteravdeling for handelsflåten (Shooting Department for the Merchant Navy). It was set up by Nortraship with training at Helenslee House in Dumbarton, outside Glasgow.) The Norwegian contingent manning the guns, a 76 mm (3.0 in) cannon forward, 10 cm (3.9 in) cannon aft and plentiful Oerlikon 20 mm cannon, consisted of one officer, a quartermaster and twelve gunners. U.S. Navy Armed Guard furnished communications and crew was supplemented by members of the U.S. Merchant Marine.

Ships operating either as Army assets or allocated to Army under charter arrangements carried Transportation Corps officers representing the Army's Port of Embarkation Commander through which the ship operated. On troop ships the individual was designated the "transport commander" who represented the Port Commander. The transport commander was in command of all Army personnel assigned to the transport and all military personnel embarked as passengers, but not of the ship or ship's personnel. (Note: This combined with the troop ships operating out of Army Ports of Embarkation at times led embarked personnel and others to term any such ships "United States Army Transport" (USAT). The term officially applied to ships owned or under bareboat charter and crewed by Army or Army contract personnel. In soldier or press accounts Torrens is sometimes seen mistakenly as U.S.A.T. Torrens. The photo of the officer's bunkroom below is so miscaptioned in the original by the Signal Corps.)

==== WSA operations ====
The first voyage under WSA was bound for the Southwest Pacific where the United States was building up forces in Australia as the Philippines were cut off. The Pensacola Convoy had been diverted there while at sea on 7 December 1941. Departing Los Angeles on 7 February Torens joined a convoy at San Francisco bound on 12 February for the Australian ports of Brisbane, Townsville, Australia, Sydney, Hobart and Wellington, New Zealand. That convoy, 2033 escorted by the cruiser New Orleans, included the other merchant ships Cape Alva, Cape Flattery, Japara, (Note: Often confused with a much smaller Dutch ship, SS Japara (1930) active in the Army's permanent local fleet in the Southwest Pacific.) Pennant, Perida and the Navy tanker USS Kaskaskia. (Note: Charles covers Pennant (6,576 GRT) and Perida (6,579 GRT) on pages 297 and 298 respectively. Both were Danish motor ships seized by the United States and turned over to WSA. Both were converted to troop transports.) Torrens had included in the cargo 40 P-400 Airacobras, 30 P-40E Warhawks and 3 A-20A Havocs.

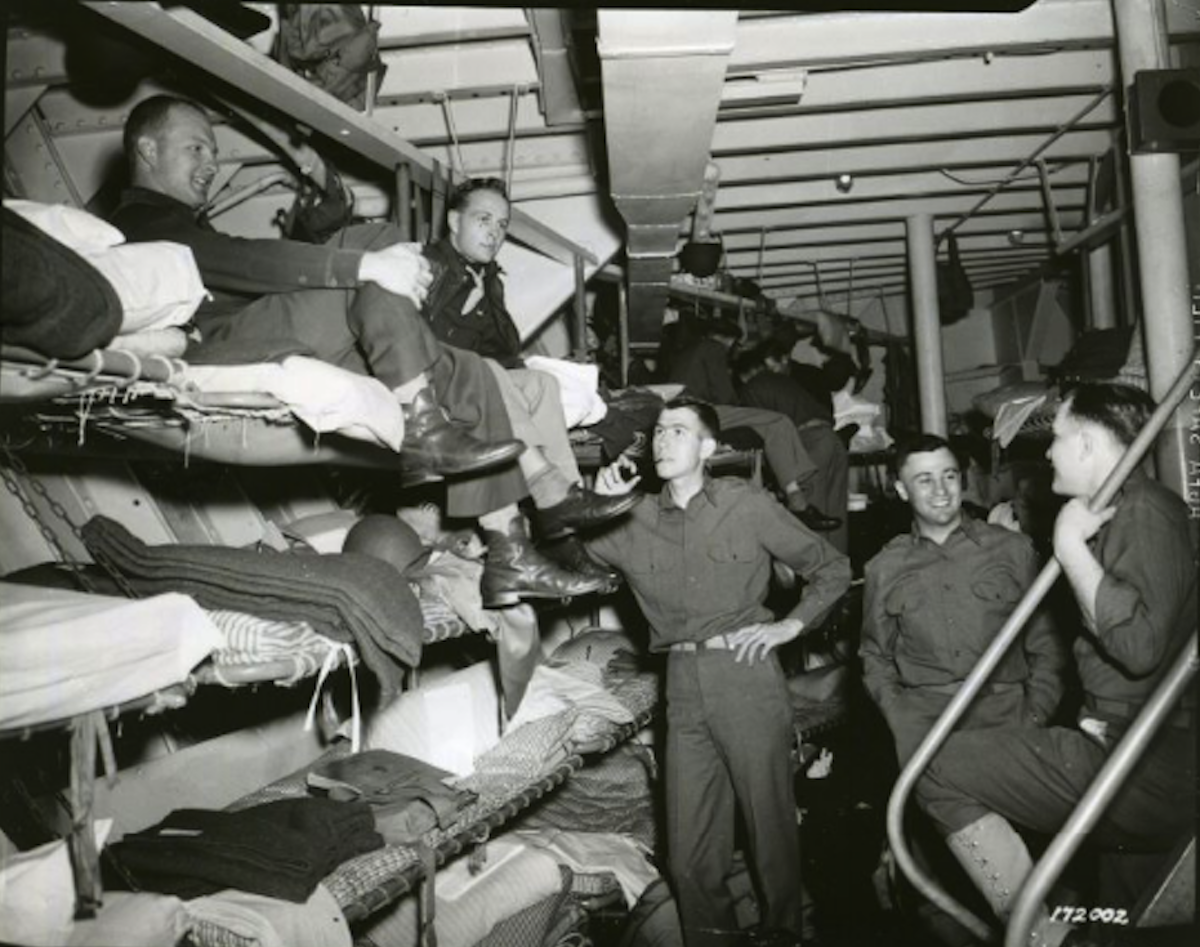
Bunkroom assigned to Officers embarking at San Francisco Port of Embarkation on Torrens. (26 October 1942)

The ship was converted in six weeks at Bethlehem Steel Company, San Francisco, to serve as a troop transport with a capacity for 1,702 passengers. (Note: No date is given. A check of Warsailors' M/S Torrens Voyages 2 shows an unusual gap in dates with an arrival in San Francisco 7 May and departure on 22 June 1942.) It also had a remaining 285,800 cu ft (8,093.0 m^{3}) cargo capacity. After that conversion Torrens made a voyage with troops from San Francisco, location of the San Francisco Port of Embarkation, in October 1942 to Townsville with return to San Francisco on 20 December. From that point all Pacific voyages began and ended at San Francisco.

Torrens made a 9 January 1943 voyage to Nouméa, New Caledonia, Lautoka, Fiji and Apia, Samoa returning early in March. Two more voyages only to Nouméa were followed by returns in July to Australian and New Guinea ports. A final 1943 voyage, departing in October, saw a return to Nouméa with additional ports at Espiritu Santo then Auckland and Wellington in New Zealand before returning in December 1943. By 1944 the ship was sailing independently of convoy schedules. In early February 1944 Torrens made a voyage to Espiritu Santo, Guadalcanal and Auckland with return to San Francisco before beginning a five month stay in the Southwest Pacific. During that stay Torrens made ports recently opened during the New Guinea campaign including Milne Bay, Finschhafen, Oro Bay, Lae, Hollandia, Wakde, Humboldt Bay before return to San Francisco in September by way of New Zealand and Nouméa.

In a deviation from the usual sailing from San Francisco directly for destinations across the Pacific Torrens made a stop to embark elements of Naval Construction Battalions at Port Hueneme, California on 26 October 1944. That voyage eventually included Milne Bay, two calls at Hollandia, Biak and Lae but also the still active war zone of Leyte in the Philippines where landings had begun on 17 October. The voyage is described by the embarked members of the Fifth Special Naval Construction Battalion, destined for Milne Bay, and the Thirty-Third Special Naval Construction Battalion destined for Leyte. (Note: Referenced accounts include shipboard photographs.) The accounts note there were about 1,700 aboard with the usual duties supplementing the ship's crew at the 20mm antiaircraft armament, communications, the long lines for two meals and lunch sandwiches. The ship crossed the Equator on 4 November with the usual ceremonies for first timers. The ship then crossed the International Date Line on 6 November. The route skirted Guadalcanal and passed through the Bismarck Archipelago giving sight of the small islands with arrival at Milne Bay 11 November for disembarkation. The Fifth Special NCB remained at Milne Bay but the 33rd reboarded Torrens after a few days bound in convoy for Leyte. with air attacks expected.

The convoy of some 40 ships came under air attack during 5 and 6 December, some ships were damaged and Torrens was credited with shooting down one attacker. Embarked personnel collected money "in appreciation of their excellent performance shooting down the Jap dive bomber yesterday". The funds were then donated by Captain Bruu to the Norwegian consulate in San Francisco to be used for the Norwegian Destroyer Foundation. (Note: Captain Bruu also collected funds for children of lost Norwegian merchant sailors. The "Captain Bruu's Children's Fund" existed after the war until those children reached maturity.) The ship remained at the arrival point landing stores until 9 December when it moved about 30 nmi (35 mi; 56 km) north landing remaining troops and stores until 19 December 1944. The ship departed Leyte on 22 December stopping at Hollandia and Biak where some 1,000 members of the 55th NCB and some pilots returning to the United States embarked. With another stop at Lae where 300 wounded embarked, Torrens departed the Southwest Pacific for San Francisco on 5 January 1945 arriving 21 January. Torrens made a final voyage in the Pacific beginning in February that included some of the old ports but the newly liberated Manila by April 1945 with a return to San Francisco with stops in the by then backwaters of the Pacific war on 14 May 1945.

On 15 June 1945 the ship departed San Francisco and the Pacific, transiting the Panama Canal, for Le Havre, France returning to New York City in July. Torrens then went to Livorno and Naples, Italy, back to New York, apparently by the Suez Canal, the Pacific and Panama Canal on a voyage from 7 August to 19 August. (Note: The schedule in the last reference notes 7 August departure from Naples "For Cristobal & Pac." with arrival in New York 19 August.) Two more trips were made to Le Havre returning to New York and then Marseille, France with return to Hampton Roads before a voyage from Hampton Roads to the Suez and Karachi with return to New York. On 20 December 1945 the ship departed New York for the Panama Canal and Okinawa with a return to San Francisco on 7 January 1946. Torrens was released from troop transport duties at San Francisco on 9 January and on 22 January 1946 returned to the Norwegian Shipping and Trade Mission.

=== Return to commercial service ===
On 9 March Torrens departed San Francisco for New York, arriving 23 March. The ship served again with Wilhelm Wilhelmsen until sold 3 June 1966 to Dimitra Cia. Nav. S. A. of Piraeus, Greece and transferred to Greek registry as Georgios M. The ship was sold in 1970 and delivered to a Chinese firm for scrapping 13 April 1970 at Hsin Kang, People's Republic of China.

== See also ==
- Norwegian Shipping and Trade Mission (Nortraship)
- MS Klipfontein (1939)

== Bibliography ==
- Alnutt, John G. (1945). Contrast — The Story of the Fifth Special Naval Construction Battalion (PDF). Navy unit cruise book, Naval History and Heritage Command collection. Archived from the original (PDF) on June 3, 2019.
- "Shiphistory: M/S Torrens". Bakgrunn for sjøhistorie.no (Background for Sea History Norway).
- Charles, Roland W. (1947). Troopships of World War II (PDF). Washington: The Army Transportation Association. LCCN 47004779. Archived from the original (PDF) on April 2, 2015.
- Dunn, Peter (12 August 2021). "US and Dutch Aircraft That Arrived In Australia by Ship During WWII". Australia@War.
- Hirschman, H (1 October 1945). The Log of the Thirty-Third (Special) U.S. Naval Construction Battalion. Thirty-Third (Special) U.S. Naval Construction Battalion.
- Lloyds. "Lloyd's Register 1938-39" (PDF). Lloyd's Register.
- Lloyds. "Lloyd's Register 1943-44" (PDF). Lloyd's Register.
- Maritime Administration. "Torrens". Ship History Database Vessel Status Card. U.S. Department of Transportation, Maritime Administration.
- Rosendahl, Bjørn Tore; Zernichow, Simen; Andersen, Thorbjørn Solberg (2021). "Thor Bruu". Krigsseilerregisteret.no (Centre for the History of Seafarers at War).
- Rosendahl, Bjørn Tore; Zernichow, Simen; Andersen, Thorbjørn Solberg (2021). "M/S Torrens". Krigsseilerregisteret.no (Centre for the History of Seafarers at War).
- "M/S Torrens — "The Ship of Good Cheer"". Tidsskriftet Krigsseileren. 1972.
- War Department (1944). FM55-10 Water Transportation: Oceangoing Vessels (PDF). War Department Field Manual. Washington, DC: United States Department of War.
- "M/S Torrens". Warsailors.com. January 14, 2011.
- "M/S Torrens Voyages 1". Warsailors.com. January 14, 2011.
- "M/S Torrens Voyages 2". Warsailors.com. January 14, 2011.
- "M/S Torrens Voyages 3". Warsailors.com. January 14, 2011.
- "M/S Torrens Voyages 4". Warsailors.com. January 14, 2011.
- Williford, Glen M. (2010). Racing the Sunrise—Reinforcing America's Pacific Outposts 1941–1942. Annapolis, Maryland: Naval Institute Press. ISBN 978-1-59114-956-9. LCCN 2010030455.
