= USAT Sicilien =

- Sicilien on the river Scheldt

History

DenmarkUnited States Army
- Name: Sicilien
- Owner: Det Forenede Dampskibs Selskab (DFDS), Copenhagen, Denmark (1938—1941); United States Maritime Commission (1941—1942)
- Operator: Det Forenede Dampskibs Selskab (1938—1941); United States Army (1941—1942)
- Port of registry: Copenhagen, Denmark
- Builder: Helsingørs Jernskibs og Maskinbyggeri A/S, Elsinore, Denmark
- Yard number: 252
- Launched: 21 June 1938
- Completed: 25 August 1938
- In service: 1938
- Out of service: 7 June 1942
- Fate: Torpedoed and sunk by German submarine U-172

General characteristics
- Tonnage: 1,654 GRT, 910 NRT, 2,520 DWT
- Length: 271.7 ft (82.8 m) (registry)
- Beam: 40.4 ft (12.3 m)
- Depth: 16.6 ft (5.1 m)
- Decks: 1
- Propulsion: 1 X 5 cylinder, 338 n.h.p. diesel engine, single screw
- Speed: 13 kn (15 mph; 24 km/h)

USAT Sicilien was the Danish motor vessel MS Sicilien built in 1938. After Germany occupied Denmark 9 April 1940 Danish ships were considered enemy ships by Britain and France and subject to seizure. Sicilien was one of forty that sought refuge in the neutral United States. On 30 March 1941 those ships were seized by the United States and requisitioned on 23 July 1941. The ship was then turned over to the United States Army for operation as a United States Army Transport.

As an Army transport the ship made a notable contribution to establishment of a system of weather stations, designated Crystal stations, in the Arctic starting in late September 1941. Sicilien and a fleet of small vessels established stations first proposed as bases on the Crimson air ferry route but first established as weather stations. In June 1942 the ship was transporting Army cargo and troops from Kingston, Jamaica to San Juan, Puerto Rico when torpedoed and sunk by U-172 with loss of 46 of the 77 persons aboard.

== Construction ==
Sicilien, yard number 252, was constructed in 1938 by Helsingørs Jernskibs og Maskinbyggeri A/S, Elsinore, Denmark for Det Forenede Dampskibs Selskab (DFDS), Copenhagen, Denmark. The company had delivered two nearly identical ships for DFDS, Tunis (hull #231) and Marocco (hull #232), in 1936 that were nominally 100 DWT less in capacity than the later ships but with identical dimensions. Algier (hull #251) and Sicilien were delivered in 1938. (Note: Reference "Poulsen" contains a list of ships built by the shipyard, pages 155-161. Page 158 shows the two 1936 ships at 1,641 GRT, 2,400 DWT, 2,000 BHP with speed of 13 kn (15 mph; 24 km/h). The 1938 ships are respectively 1,654 GRT, 2,524 DWT (Algier)/2,525 DWT (Sicilien), 1,600 IHP with speed of 13 kn (15 mph; 24 km/h))

Sicilien, signal OYWY, was a one deck vessel with a cruiser stern, 1,654 GRT, 910 NRT, 2,520 DWT 271.7 ft (82.8 m) registered length, 40.4 ft (12.3 m) beam and 16.6 ft (5.1 m) depth. Sicilien was powered by a single 5 cylinder, 338 n.h.p. diesel engine driving one screw for a speed of 13 kn (15 mph; 24 km/h). A shipyard photo of the apparent launch is dated 21 June 1938.

== History ==
Sicilien was one of four similar cargo ships in commercial service for Det Forenede Dampskibs Selskab (DFDS), Copenhagen, operating between northwest Europe and the Mediterranean. After war began in Europe Sicilien and the three other new ships Tunis, Marocco, Algier were put into Atlantic service. The change was due to a surge in freight to North and South America. The ship arrived in New York on the day before Germany occupied Denmark on 9 April 1940. Sicilien and a similar company ship, Tunis, were in New York when the United States government seized Danish ships on 30 March 1941.

There was no Danish government in exile, the government completely subject to German influence, and Danish ships were thus considered by Britain and France to be enemy ships subject to seizure. Danish ships not seized by the belligerents sought refuge in neutral ports, particularly the United States. In New York a Danish Shipping Committee, without government powers, attempted to negotiate an "understanding" with representatives of the British and French governments without success. Under German pressure the Danish government ordered the ships in neutral ports to remain there and their crews to refuse any service including a law in Denmark prohibiting crews in neutral ports to sign on with other ships. The shortage of ships and crews among the Allied belligerents and neutral United States led to the United States seizing Danish ships on 30 March 1941. Denmark officially protested the seizure as against international law and demanding immediate return to no avail.

Sicilien was one of forty Danish merchant vessels, totaling 142,641 GRT, seized by the United States Coast Guard and then requisitioned for use or transfer of title under the Ship Requisition Act. (Note: Public Law 101, Acquisition of Domestic or Foreign Merchant Vessels.) Most of the Danish ships were delivered to the War Shipping Administration (WSA), registered in Panama for diplomatic reasons, and operated under new names by commercial companies as WSA agents. (Note: The United States Maritime Commission in a letter dated August 20, 1941 appealed to Danish seamen "to serve the cause of democracy" by remaining with the vessels as crew.) Sicilien was delivered to WSA in New York on 12 July 1941 and delivered under Executive Order by WSA to the Army under bareboat charter on 23 July for operation as an Army Transport.

Sicilien was the main transport for establishment of an air ferry route that would allow shorter range aircraft to fly from Newfoundland to Scotland by way of Greenland and Iceland. Surveys made during June and July 1941 selected sites for the route, designated the Crimson Route, but winter would preclude any construction. Instead the Army established weather stations designated at Crystal I at Fort Chimo, Labrador, Crystal II at the upper end of Frobisher Bay and Crystal III off the northeast coast of Baffin Island on Paallavvik Island.

Sicilien loaded a small detachment with arctic equipment, housing, fuel and weather and communications equipment for each of the CRYSTAL weather stations at the Boston Port of Embarkation and departed 21 September 1941. The sites were accessible only with smaller vessels and extreme caution was required due to poor charts, ice, snow and tides up to 42 ft (12.8 m). Sicilien made a stop at Halifax, Nova Scotia picking up five trawlers and three Norwegian vessels for the mission. Some of the ship's cargo was transferred to the smaller vessels at Halifax with a later transfer at Port Burwell, Nunavut near Crystal 1.

Sicilien transiting unescorted from Kingston, Jamaica to San Juan, Puerto Rico with Army personnel was torpedoed and sunk on 7 June 1942 (Note: MARAD date. Web sites give 8 June.) by Germany's U-172 about 10 nautical miles (19 km) south of Cape Beata, Dominican Republic (17°30′N 71°20′W). The Lives lost included 27 of the ships complement, including the master, and 19 Army passengers. The 31 survivors made it to rafts, were questioned by Germans and made Barahona, Dominican Republic a few hours later.

In 1958 the United States offered Denmark $5,396,202 in settlement of claims for use and loss of all forty vessels including Sicilien.

== Bibliography ==
- "Foreign Passenger and Cargo Ships Taken Over by U.S Maritime Commission during World War II". American Merchant Marine at War (USMM.org). 21 March 2011.
- Bykofsky, Joseph; Larson, Harold (1990). The Technical Services—The Transportation Corps: Operations Overseas (PDF). United States Army In World War II. Washington, DC: Center Of Military History, United States Army. LCCN 56060000. Archived from the original (PDF) on September 27, 2012.
- Grover, David (1987). U.S. Army Ships and Watercraft of World War II. Naval Institute Press. pp. 27, 28, 64. ISBN 0-87021-766-6. LCCN 87015514.
- Kauffmann, Henrik (May 22, 1941). "The Danish Minister (Kauffmann) to the Secretary of State". United States Department of State, Office of the Historian, Foreign Service Institute.
- Lloyds (1938). "Lloyd's Register 1937-38" (PDF). Lloyd's Register.
- Lloyds (1942). "Lloyd's Register 1941-42". Lloyd's Register.
- "M/S SICILIEN (DFDS)". M/S Museum of Maritime Image Archive. 2021.
- Maritime Administration. "Sicilien". Ship History Database Vessel Status Card. U.S. Department of Transportation, Maritime Administration.
- Priolo, Gary P. (2021). "USAT Sicilien". NavSource.
- Perkins (September 11, 1941). "The Chargé in Denmark (Perkins) to the Secretary of State". United States Department of State, Office of the Historian, Foreign Service Institute.
- Poulsen, Hanne (2016). "HELSINGØR VÆRFT 1882-1982" (PDF). M/S Museet for Søfart. Helsingør, Denmark: Museet for Søfart.
- Plannthin, Mikkel (Apr 18, 2021). "Jørgen Ryhl Bineau". Danish WW2 Pilots.
- Roberts, Stephen S. (10 Jan 2010). "Class: AQUILA (AK-47)". ShipScribe.
- "Sicilien". Uboat net.
- Denmark, Claims: Compensation for Requisitioning and Use or Loss of Danish Vessels During World War II. United States Treaties and Other International Agreements. Vol. 9. Washington, D.C.: United States Department of State. 1958. pp. 1088–1089.
- "USAT Sicilien (+1942)". The Wrecksite. 2007.
