= YFB =

YFB may refer to:

- Iqaluit Airport (IATA: YFB, ICAO: CYFB)
- Yves-François Blanchet, leader of the Bloc Québécois
