= MS Klipfontein (1939) =

Dutch ocean liner

- Klipfontein

History

Netherlands
- Name: Klipfontein
- Owner: N.V. Vereenigde Nederlandsche Scheepvaartmaatschappij
- Operator: Vereenigde Nederlandsche Scheepv Mij.
- Port of registry: The Hague
- Builder: Machinefabriek en Scheepswerf van P. Smit Jr. N.V., Rotterdam, Netherlands
- Yard number: 517
- Launched: 4 March 1939
- Acquired: 29 July 1939
- Identification: Signal: PFKC
- Fate: Sank in 1953 off Ponta Zavora, East Africa after striking an unidentified object

General characteristics
- Type: Cargo/passenger liner
- Tonnage: 10,544 GRT, 6,329 NRT, 9,933 DWT
- Length: 520 ft (158.5 m) LOA; 499.3 ft (152.2 m) LBP
- Beam: 62 ft 9 in (19.1 m)
- Depth: 33 ft 1 in (10.1 m)
- Decks: 3
- Propulsion: 2 × 5 cyl Smit – Burmeister & Wain diesel, 12,000 bhp, 2,052 nhp; 2 screw
- Speed: 17.5 knots (32.4 km/h; 20.1 mph)
- Capacity: Passengers: 198: 130 first class, 68 steerage; Cargo: 445,000 cu ft (12,601.0 m^{3}) (bale); 481,000 cu ft (13,620.4 m^{3}) (grain)

MS Klipfontein was a Dutch ocean liner launched in March 1939 and delivered 29 July intended for South African service. Declaration of war in Europe, including Britain and South Africa declaring war on Germany, resulted in the ship being transferred to service between the Dutch East Indies and the west coast of North America. After the German invasion of the Netherlands in May 1940, with the Dutch government in exile in London, the ship supported the Allied war effort. After entry of the United States into the war the ship was operated by Dutch agents of the U.S. War Shipping Administration (WSA) from February 1942 to February 1946 as a troopship from the U.S. West Coast to Pacific war zones.

The ship was lost 8 January 1953 in the vicinity of Inhambane during a voyage from Lourenco Marques to Beira, Mozambique. All passengers were saved and the cargo was later in part salvaged.

== Construction ==
Klipfontein was built as a passenger and cargo vessel by Machinefabriek en Scheepswerf van P. Smit Jr. N.V., Rotterdam, Netherlands for N.V. Vereenigde Nederlandsche Scheepvaartmaatschappij, (United Netherlands Shipping Company) The Hague, Netherlands as hull 517. The steel hull, three deck ship, built for the company's Holland-Africa Line's South African service, was launched 4 March 1939 and delivered on 29 July as the first of three sister ships. (Note: Sister ship MS Oranjefontein (1940) was launched 21 March 1940 and was delivered 20 December 1940 after the German invasion of the Netherlands in May 1939. That ship was seized by Germany, survived the war and was returned to the Netherlands in 1945.)

== History ==
In October 1939, after the German Invasion of Poland and war was declared by Britain and South Africa, Klipfontein was transferred to the Java-Pacific Line for operation between the Dutch East Indies and the west coast of North America.

=== World War II ===
Klipfontein, which had been operating for the Allied war effort before the U.S. entry, was one of the Dutch ships taken over by the War Shipping Administration (WSA) 23 February 1942, allocated to U.S. Army with the nature of the operating agreement with the Netherlands Ministry of Shipping changed 23 May 1942 to a time charter extending until 1 February 1946. The operating agreement was with the Army Transportation Corps with the ship sometimes seen as the USAT Klipfontein though it was never under Army administration. The ship was one of the WSA troopships operated by agents, in this case for most of the war by the Dutch operating company Stoomvaart Maatschappij Nederland.

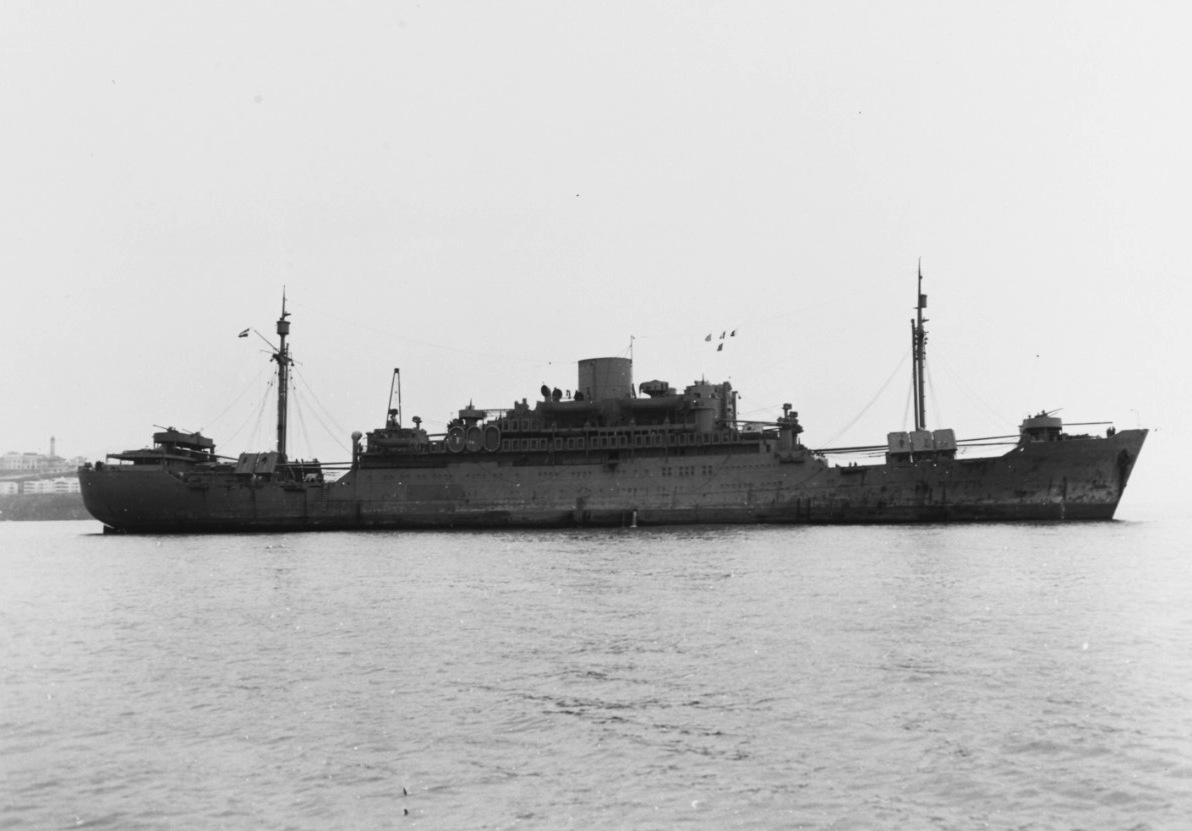
Klipfontein off Alcatraz Island, San Francisco, California about 1943.

Klipfontein departed San Francisco with cargo for Australia in March 1942 returning by way of New Zealand in May before alterations required to become a troop transport had been made. Subsequent to those alterations the ship made regular trips to the South West Pacific operation area with some operations in the Central Pacific operation areas. As an example of the ships originating in Allied and occupied nations is a convoy escorted by USS Chester departing 2 September 1942 from Nouméa, New Caledonia with the transports Klipfontein, Noordam, Tjisdane and Torrens. Noordam and Tjisdane were as Klipfontein Dutch ships while Torrens was Norwegian.

The ship made multiple, routine trips from San Francisco to Australia and the islands on the route into 1943 as the Allies advanced in the region. From October 1943 until the end of 1944 the route began to include ports recently secured during the New Guinea campaign such as Milne Bay, Oro Bay where on one trip the ship as aground for 72 hours, Buna and Finschhafen.

Among those the ship transported was the U.S. Army X Army Corps headquarters departing from San Francisco on 14 July 1944 on the way to Oro Bay. Those troops ultimately reached the Philippines.

Later in 1944 Klipfontein began transport to areas in the central Pacific with some departures from Seattle to include Guam, Saipan, Ulithi and Eniwetok. In 1945 the ship's destinations included Leyte and Manila in the Philippines and eventually Yokohama and Nagoya, Japan. On return from Japan on 2 January 1946 the ship was released from transport duties.

The ship was returned to civilian use 1 February 1946.

=== Postwar fate ===
Klipfontein sinking.

Klipfontein was lost during a voyage from Amsterdam to South and East Africa. During passage departing Lourenco Marques on 8 January 1953 for Beira, Mozambique the ship had passed Ponta Zavora some 2.5 nmi (2.9 mi; 4.6 km) distant when some 22 minutes later a vibration followed by three impacts was felt. The ship was abandoned an hour later, with the passengers and crew getting rescued by the ocean liner Bloemfontein Castle.

The wreck of Klipfontein lies between two reef systems, an inshore and offshore reef, near Zavora. The exact nature of the cause is still a matter of question. There is speculation the ship struck the reef in which the wreckage now lies. Others note shipwrecks in the area including a possible German submarine.

The cargo consisted of 1000 tons of copper and manganese ore and 100 bales of wool. The copper was later recovered.

== Wreck ==
The wreck, the exact cause still a mystery, lies at 53 m (174 ft) and is a critical habitat for giant groupers. Manta rays may also be seen.
