= Paallavvik =

Island in Nunavut, Canada

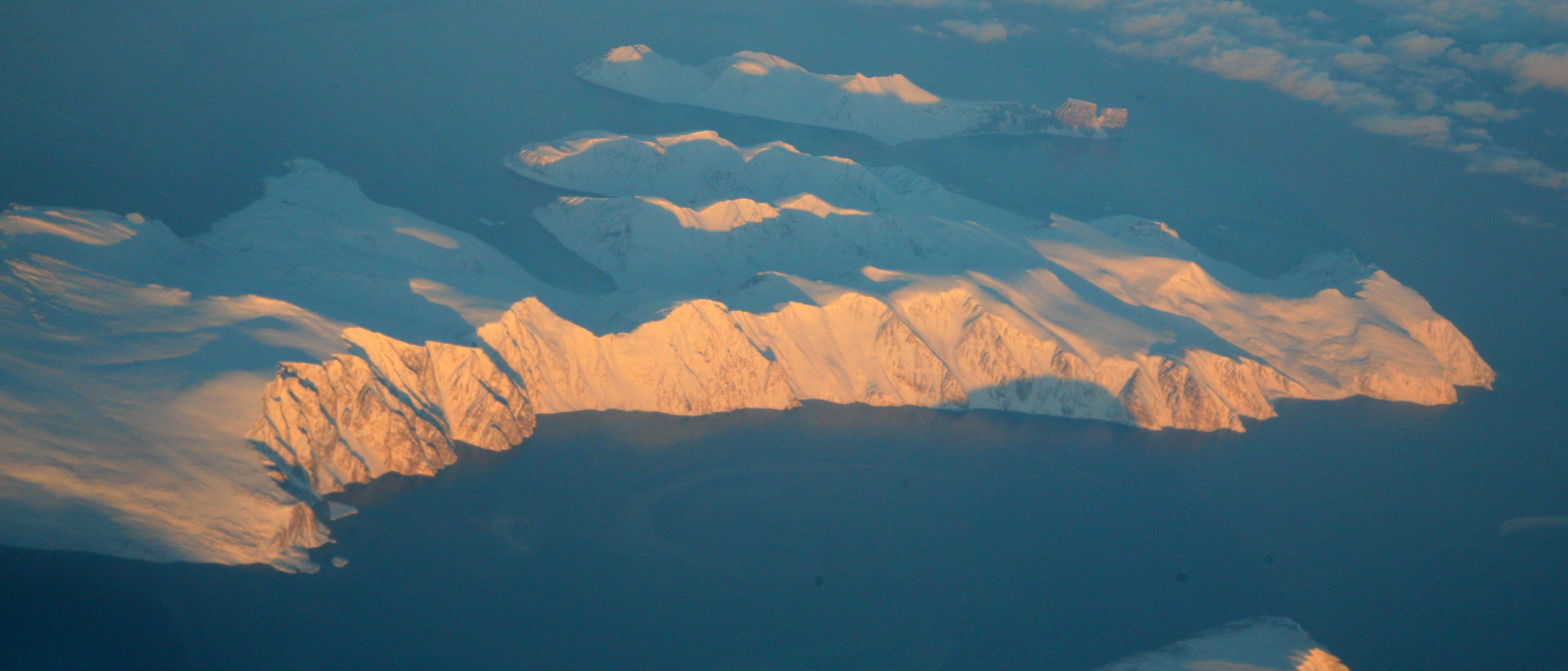

- Location within Nunavut Location within Canada

Geography
- Location: Davis Strait
- Coordinates: 67°06′17″N 062°37′20″W
- Archipelago: Arctic Archipelago
- Length: 6 km (3.7 mi)
- Width: 1–2 km (0.62–1.24 mi)

Administration
- Canada
- Territory: Nunavut
- Region: Qikiqtaaluk

Demographics
- Population: Uninhabited

Paallavvik (Inuktitut syllabics: ᐹᓪᓚᕝᕕᒃ, Paallavvik means 'the place where one stumbles', from paallat 'to stumble' + -vik 'place for X-ing', or paallakpuq 'to fall down (forward), trip, fall forward') formerly Padloping Island is an uninhabited island in the Qikiqtaaluk Region of Nunavut, Canada. It is located in Merchants Bay, just to the south of Davis Strait, and off the eastern coast of Baffin Island. The smaller Aggijjat (formerly Durban Island) is approximately 7 km (4.3 mi) to the east, while Auyuittuq National Park is to the west.

== Geography ==
It measures 4–6 km (2.5–3.7 mi) long, by 1–2 km (0.62–1.24 mi) wide.

== History ==
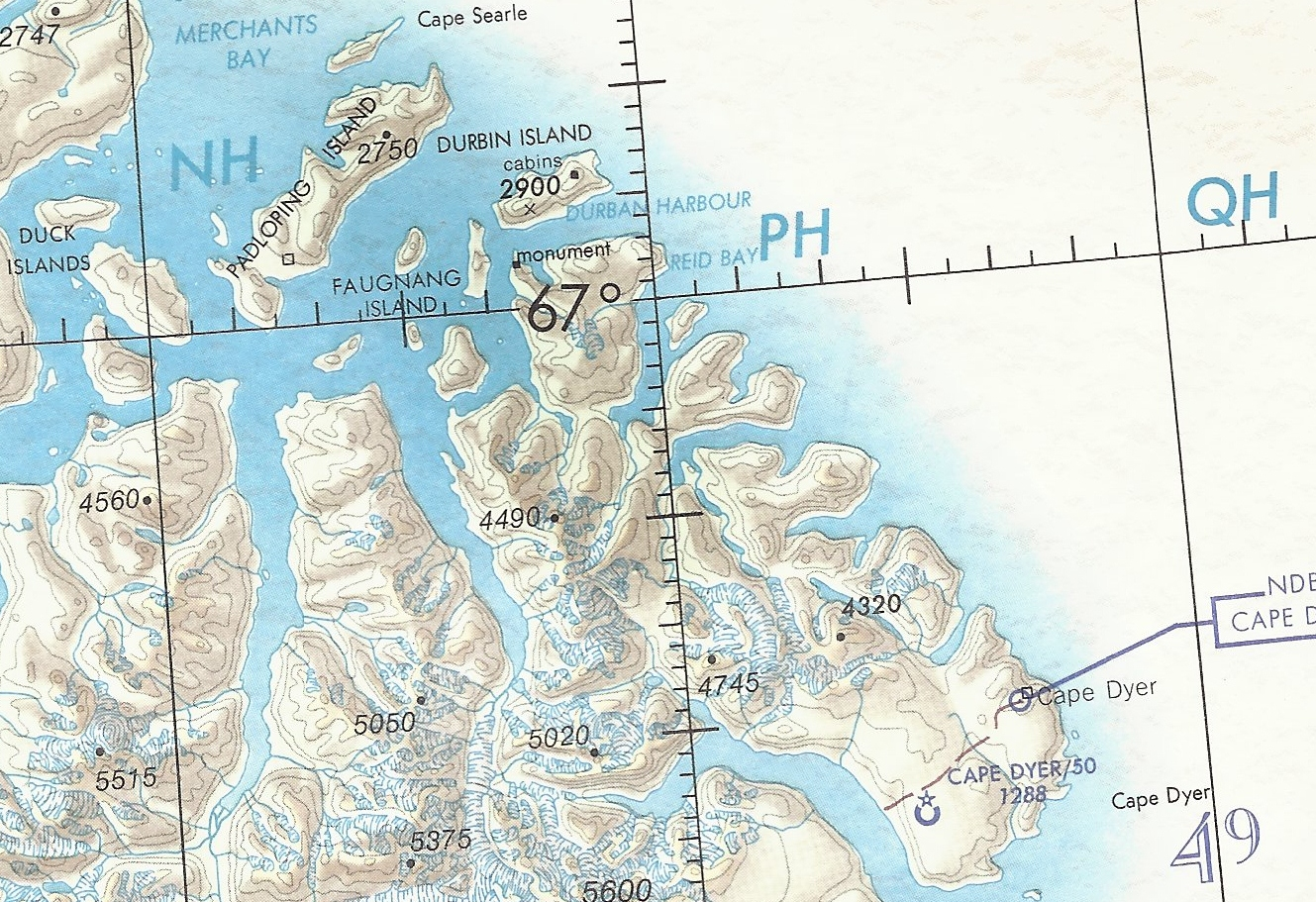
The Padloping Island station relative to later station at Cape Dyer. US DOD ONC C-12/Aug 1972

Padloping was originally an Inuit community on the island by the same name. In July 1941, a United States Army Air Forces (USAAF) team headed by Captain Elliott Roosevelt conducted aerial reconnaissance for an airport site in the region of Baffin Island closest to Greenland. Roosevelt selected the southern edge of Paallavvik as the most promising, there being no better places between there and Cape Dyer. His report recommended the construction of a 1,200 m (4,000 ft) airstrip on the island. A 10-man radio/meteorological team under the command of United States Army Air Corps (USAAC) Captain J. Glenn Dyer landed at Padloping on 16 October 1941 from the transport USAT Sicilien (assisted by trawler Cormorant and sealer Quest), and commenced routine meteorological reporting after the ships left on 30 October. A local Inuk called "Vee-Vee" served as a guide for the task force and returned to Pangnirtung aboard it.

Padloping was intended to be third node of the Crimson East air ferry route and was labelled Crystal III. The station was referred to by the coded reference "Delight." It was found that it was impractical to construct a landing strip on land, and instead a 1,829 m × 76 m (6,000 ft × 250 ft) ice runway was laid out, usable from December until June. Ski-equipped aircraft inaugurated the field in February 1942, but it never saw any use for its intended purpose, and the Crimson project was cancelled in 1943. Weather reporting by the 8th Weather Squadron continued for the duration of the war.

In January 1947, the Cabinet of Canada approved the transfer of the Padloping weather station from the United States to the Canadian Department of Transportation, effective 1949–1950. However, by 1949, the transfer date had been postponed to summer of 1951 as there were insufficient Department of Transport personnel available to staff Padloping's combined meteorological and radio range station. But in June 1951, with the Department of Transportation still unable to assume the commitment, the United States agreed to continue the Padloping operation.

In 1953, the Royal Canadian Navy took over operations, establishing weather station VFU8. Operations were abandoned by 1956.

Per the U.S. National Climatic Data Center, the original Padloping station (67°06′N 062°21′W) provided weather from 1 November 1941 to 31 December 1956. Padloping Site 40 (67°06′N 062°09′W) then reported weather from 1 December 1955 to 28 February 1958.

It is currently listed as a contaminated site, to be remediated in the future by the government.
