= Crimson Route =

Planned allied transport routes during World War II

The Crimson Route was a set of joint United States and Canada transport routes planned for ferrying planes and material from North America to Europe during World War II. The project was ended in 1943 and never fully developed.

== Overview ==
The 1940 fall of France and the Battle of Britain alarmed Americans who feared that Great Britain might also fall, bringing the Axis one step closer to the United States. Eschewing direct involvement in the war, in 1940, the United States concentrated on "hemisphere defense" and began planning for airfields and air routes in the Arctic. With the fall of Denmark in April, Greenland came under U.S. protection, and an inconclusive survey for airfields was made there that summer.

With the passage of the Lend-Lease act in March 1941, large numbers of American-built aircraft were to be ferried to the United Kingdom. Joint American-British-Canadian-Free Danish efforts resulted in airfields being built or expanded on Newfoundland (Argentia, Gander, Stephenville, St. John's, and Torbay), in Labrador (Goose Bay), and by that summer, Greenland (Bluie West One). The British airfield in Reykjavík, Iceland, was expanded and supplemented by the American built airfield at Keflavík.

Because of the urgency of the situation and heavy losses at sea, interest developed in creating an alternate air ferry route further north. It would have better weather conditions and would be on a great-circle route from the aircraft factories on the west coast. It could also serve as overflow or alternate destinations for air traffic on the southern route. For this purpose the Crystal stations (Fort Chimo, Frobisher Bay, and Padloping Island) were surveyed in northern Quebec and Baffin Island and airfields put into operation. That October, the important airport at Bluie West Eight (Sondrestrom) was founded in Greenland.

During the Argentia conference in August, USAAF Captain Elliott Roosevelt (who had surveyed the Crystal stations) briefed the top decisionmakers on the concept for the alternate route, which was accepted and given high priority. The network was now extended to include Crimson West, extending from Edmonton to Frobisher, and Crimson East, which used new bases east of Hudson Bay.

This meant that the aircraft could be flown across the United States and Canada, where they would then be flown across the North Atlantic via Greenland and Iceland, never exceeding about 700 nautical miles in needed range.

A much shorter route from Southern California could be used by flying a Great Circle Route north through central and northern Canada from Southern California, the distance to Iceland might be cut by almost 600 miles. It was expected that much more favourable flying weather would be found than in Northeastern North America, that valuable experience with Arctic conditions of flight would be acquired, and that the experiment might lead to the development of a shorter airway into Russia (see: Northwest Staging Route).

In practice, the northern alternate route suffered from extended darkness and extreme cold in winter, and difficult resupply and sparse infrastructure in both winter and summer. With the greater success of the southern route and the defeat of Germany's U-boats in 1943, the Crimson concept fell into disfavor, but not until the fields and considerable support facilities had been constructed.

== Planned routes ==
First referred to as the "North East Staging Route" it eventually became known as the "Crimson Project" or "Crimson Route", with Crimson being the code-name for Canada. [Many have suggested that the Crimson moniker referred to the sanguinary expectation of a back-flow of killed and wounded from battlefields in Europe. However, while this was expected and base hospitals built on many fields, it does not account for the name.] The project came under the jurisdiction of the Air Transport Command North Atlantic Division. Originally there were to be three routes making up the Crimson Route: Eastern, Western and Central.

=== Eastern route ===
Name	Location	Coordinates	Notes
Presque Isle Army Airfield	ME	46°41′20″N 68°02′41″W	Chief port of embarkation for U.S. aircraft flying the North Atlantic. Headquarters, 23d AAF Ferrying Wing, Ferrying Command 12 June 1942; re-designated North Atlantic Wing, Air Transport Command, 11 February 1944; Redesignated North Atlantic Division, ATC, 27 June 1944. After Crimson Route project cancelled, was used as part of the Northern Transport Route through Goose Bay until 1945. Closed as an ATC base on 20 September 1945.
Goose Air Base	NF	53°19′09″N 60°25′33″W	1383d AAFBU, North Atlantic Division, ATC, part of Newfoundland Base Command. After Crimson Route project cancelled, was used as part of the Northern Transport Route through Greenland until 1945. ATC operations ended 1945. Was major USAF base in the Cold War, housing units of Strategic Air Command and Aerospace Defense Command. The base was turned over to the Canadian Government in 1966. It was later home to permanent detachments of the Royal Air Force, Luftwaffe, Aeronautica Militare, and Royal Netherlands Air Force.
Crystal I	QC	58°05′45″N 68°25′36″W	Planned Hub with Central Route originating at Detroit, Michigan; reduced to a weather station in 1943, closed 1945. Now Kuujjuaq Airport
Crystal II	NWT	63°45′20″N 68°32′22″W	Planned Hub with Western Route originating at Great Falls, Montana; 1384th AAFBU, North Atlantic Division, ATC; reduced to a weather station in 1943. During the Cold War was used as a radar station and as a base for construction of the DEW Line. Closed by USAF in 1963, now Iqaluit Airport.
Crystal III	NWT	67°06′13″N 062°37′08″W	Abandoned 1943.
Bluie West 8	GL	67°00′41″N 50°42′50″W	Part of Greenland Base Command. After Crimson Route project cancelled, was used as part of the Northern Transport Route through Greenland until 1945. Became SAC base during the Cold War. Closed 1992 now civilian community (Kangerlussuaq) and airport (Kangerlussuaq Airport),
Bluie East 2	GL	65°34′59″N 37°37′00″W	Part of Greenland Base Command. After Crimson Route project cancelled, was used as part of the Northern Transport Route through Greenland until 1945 then closed.
Meeks Field	IS	63°59′03″N 22°36′24″W	Part of Iceland Base Command. 1386th AAFBU, North Atlantic Division, ATC; After Crimson Route project cancelled, was used as part of the Northern Transport Route. Became NATO interceptor base during the Cold War as Keflavik Airport. Turned over to Iceland Government 2006.
Prestwick Airport	UK	55°30′28″N 04°35′25″W	Main arrival point for USAAF aircraft ferried to UK over various North Atlantic Transport Routes. 1403d AAFBU, European Division, ATC. Used by the USAF until the mid-1950s, now commercial airport.

This route was referred to by the American military as the "North Atlantic Ferrying" or "Staging Route."

=== Central route ===
Name	Location	Coordinates	Notes
Romulus Army Airfield	MI	42°13′01″N 83°21′13″W	553d AAFBU, Ferrying Division, Domestic Wing, ATC (Detroit) Embarkation Point, also HQ, 2d Ferrying Group. Opened April 1940. Initial mission of base was delivery of military aircraft to British in Canada prior to United States Entry into the war; later coordinated WASP ferrying activities in Upper Midwest, and movement of B-24 Liberators from Ford Willow Run plant for shipment to ETO and MTO. Turned over to civil control, 1945 now Detroit Metropolitan Wayne County Airport
RCAF Station North Bay	ON	46°21′46″N 79°25′16″W	Prewar RCAF station, after 1945 became major air defense installation during the Cold War. Today CFB North Bay is NORAD ROCC for both Canada East and West NORAD regions.
Kapuskasing	ON	49°24′51″N 82°28′15″W	Became Kapuskasing Airport providing regional airline service in Northern Ontario.
Moosonee	ON	51°17′26″N 80°36′33″W	Became Moosonee Airport providing regional airline service in Northern Ontario.
Richmond Gulf	QC	56°15′00″N 76°16′59″W	Planned, no airfield constructed
Crystal I	QC		Hub with Eastern Route; followed to Prestwick Airport, Great Britain (see eastern route)

Most of the Canadian airfields were newly and expressly constructed for the purpose of the Crimson Route.

=== Western route ===
Name	Location	Coordinates	Notes
Great Falls Army Air Base	MT	47°30′15″N 111°11′13″W	Principal mission of base was preparing Lend-Lease aircraft for shipment to USSR 1944–1945; base served as aerial port for personnel and cargo moving between CONUS and Alaskan bases. Postwar became major SAC bomber and missile base. Malmstrom AFB today Minuteman ICBM missile base part of Air Force Strike Command.
Regina	SK	50°25′55″N 104°39′57″W	Prewar airport, opened about 1930. Today major airport in Midwestern Canada, providing airline service throughout country and to the United States.
The Pas	MB	53°58′17″N 101°05′31″W	Constructed 1943 by United States engineers for Crimson Route. Completed facility turned over to Canadian government 1944. Now regional airport in northern Manitoba.
Churchill	MB	58°44′49″N 094°04′26″W	Constructed 1943 by United States engineers for Crimson Route. Completed facility turned over to Canadian government 1944. Now regional airport in northern Manitoba.
Southampton	NWT	64°30′00″N 084°30′00″W	Constructed 1943 by United States engineers for Crimson Route. Completed facility turned over to Canadian government 1944. Now Coral Harbour Airport in Nunavut.
Crystal II	NWT		Hub with Eastern Route; followed to Prestwick Airport, Great Britain (See Eastern Route)

This was the route that the American military directly referred to using the term Crimson Route.

== History ==
A directive issued by the United States Chief of Staff on 24 May 1942 ordered construction of landing strips at The Pas and Churchill in Manitoba, at Coral Harbour Southampton Island on Hudson Bay, along with weather stations and runways at Fort Chimo Quebec (CRYSTAL I), on Frobisher Bay (CRYSTAL II), and on Padloping Island (CRYSTAL III) to begin during the summer of 1942.

The project received a severe setback in late summer (27 August 1942) when an enemy U-boat operating off the Labrador coast sank a ship carrying some 6,000 tons of cargo, including vital construction equipment intended for use at CRYSTAL I, CRYSTAL II, and Coral Harbour on Southampton Island Hudson Bay.

The winter of 1942-43 presented major problems all along the North Atlantic Transport Route. A high accident rate due to weather was experienced beginning in September 1942 and it continued to climb. On 22 November Air Transport Command suspended the transportation of passengers across the North Atlantic for the duration of the winter. The operation of two-engine transports beyond Iceland already had been forbidden. Some ferrying, chiefly of long-range aircraft, continued into December, as did the transport operations of C-54 Skymasters and C-87 Liberators under contract with TWA and American Airlines, but by mid-December the North Atlantic Transport Route had been virtually closed down for the winter

ATC traffic to Great Britain was diverted to the South Atlantic Transport Route. The distance to Britain by this route was double that of the projected CRIMSON route, but distance dis-advantage was eclipsed by the fact that operations that could be maintained on a year-round basis.

Efforts on another front were also productive. Prior to 1943 the Portuguese government only allowed German U-boats and navy ships to refuel in the Azores. However diplomatic efforts in 1943 persuaded Portuguese dictator Salazar to lease bases on Azores Islands to the British. This represented a change in policy and was a key turning point in the Battle of the Atlantic allowing the Allies to provide aerial coverage in the middle of the Atlantic. This helped allies to hunt U-boats, protect vital convoys and support mid-Atlantic Air Transport Command ferry efforts.

This new prospect in 1943 that a transatlantic route through the Azores would soon be possible brought the expensive and unlucky CRIMSON ROUTE project to an early end. On the recommendation of ATC, the Army Air Force in the spring of 1944 abandoned the airfields at The Pas, Churchill and Southampton Island while those at the CRYSTALS and Mingan were reduced to emergency status. Save for five RAF planes which followed the CRIMSON routes to the United Kingdom in the summer of 1943, virtually no other use was of the route by either ferried or transport United States aircraft.

== See also ==
- North Atlantic air ferry route in World War II
- South Atlantic air ferry route in World War II
- South Pacific air ferry route in World War II
- West Coast Wing (Air Transport Command route to Alaska)
- Northwest Staging Route
