= MS Tunis =

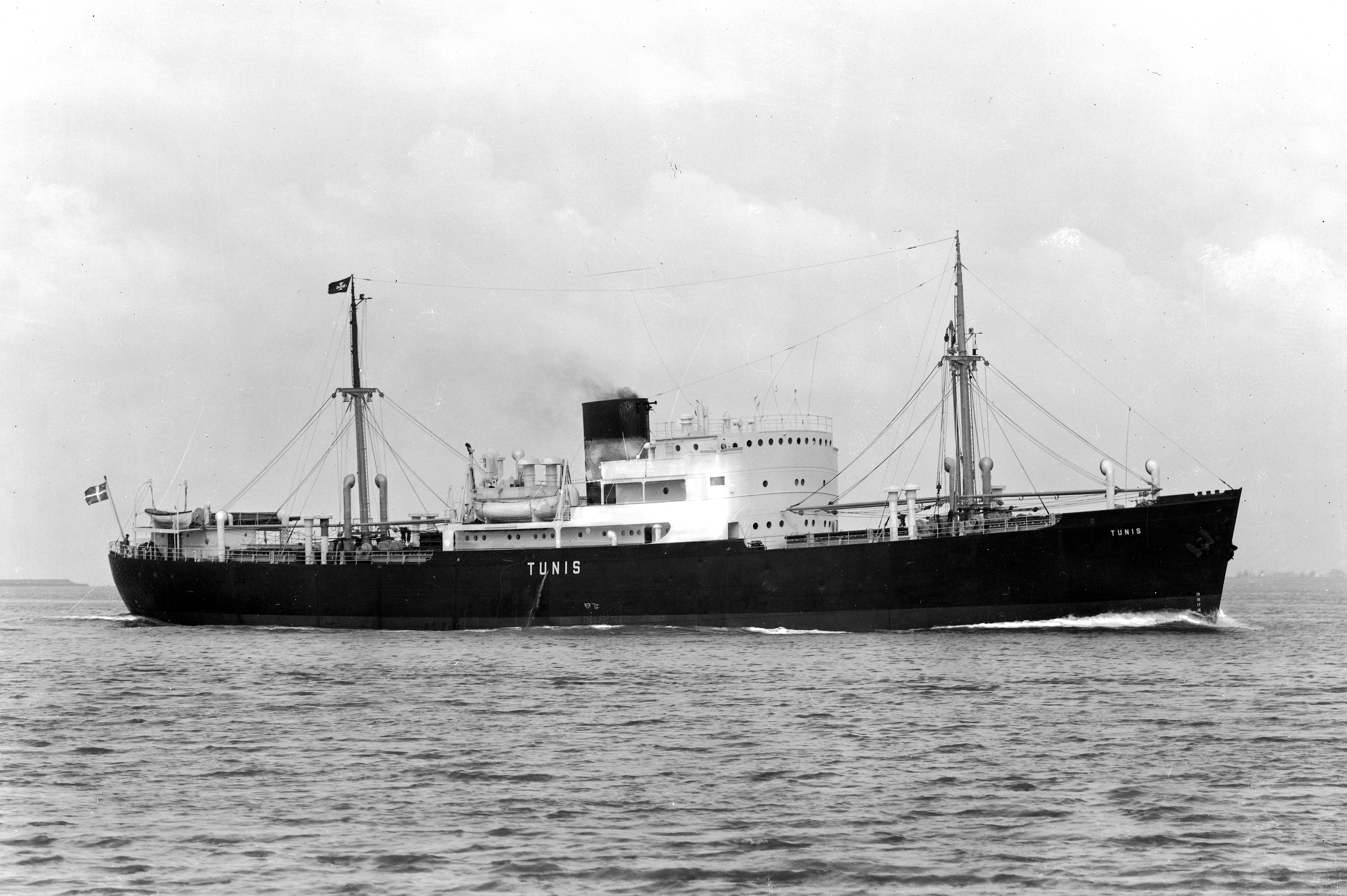
- Tunis on the river Scheldt

History
- Name: Denmark Tunis (1936—1941); United States Aquila (1941—1945); United States Bonanza (1945—1946); Denmark Tunis (1946—1966); Greece Maria T (1966—1972); Greece Mathios (1972—1975)
- Owner: Det Forenede Dampskibs Selskab (DFDS), Copenhagen, Denmark (1936—1941); United States Maritime Commission (1941—1946); DFDS (1946—1966); Eletson Maritime Corp., Piraeus, Greece (1966—1972); Rigas Bros. & Dinos Mitropoulis, Piraeus (1972—1978)
- Operator: Det Forenede Dampskibs Selskab (DFDS) (1936—1941); Marine Operating Company, Inc. (July–August 1941); United States Navy (1941—1945); Alcoa Steam Ship Co. (1945—1946); DFDS (1946—1966); Eletson Maritime Corp., Piraeus (1966—1972); Rigas Bros. & Dinos Mitropoulis, Piraeus (1972—1978)
- Port of registry: Copenhagen, Denmark; Baltimore; Copenhagen; Piraeus (probable)
- Builder: Helsingørs Jernskibs og Maskinbyggeri A/S, Elsinore, Denmark
- Yard number: 231
- Laid down: 10 August 1935
- Launched: 8 November 1935
- Completed: Trial: 14 January 1936
- Acquired: Delivered: 15 January 1936; To USN: 11 August 1941
- Commissioned: (USN) 24 October 1941
- Decommissioned: (USN) 9 October 1945
- Maiden voyage: 18 January 1936 (Copenhagen to Antwerp)
- In service: 1936
- Out of service: 1978
- Fate: Scrapped in Greece in 1978

General characteristics
- Tonnage: 1,641 GRT, 925 NRT, 2,545 DWT; 1,559 GRT, 821 NRT (1946)
- Displacement: 2,054 tons light, 4,075 tons loaded
- Length: 288.1 ft (87.8 m) (LOA); 271.7 ft (82.8 m) (registry)
- Beam: 40.4 ft (12.3 m)
- Draft: 18.3 ft (5.6 m)
- Depth: 16.6 ft (5.1 m)
- Decks: 1
- Propulsion: 1 X 5 cylinder, 338 n.h.p. Burmeister & Wain diesel engine, single screw
- Speed: 12.5 kn (14.4 mph; 23.2 km/h)
- Notes: Navy armament: 2 X 3 in (76 mm) guns, 4 X 20mm

MS Tunis was a Danish motor ship in commercial service for Det Forenede Dampskibs Selskab (DFDS), Copenhagen, Denmark, as a cargo ship delivered to DFDS on 15 January 1936. Tunis was the first of four sister ships, two built in 1936 and two in 1938, that operated for DFDS. The ship's normal service was Copenhagen to the Mediterranean until war in Europe when all four of the ships were put into Atlantic service.

The United States seized Danish vessels in its ports in 1941 after Germany occupied Denmark on 9 April 1940. Tunis was seized in New York and delivered by the War Shipping Administration to the U.S. Navy under bareboat charter and commissioned USS Aquila (AK-47) for service in World War II. Aquila operated in the North Atlantic delivering general cargo and equipment to ships and stations in the war zone.

After Danish ships were returned to Denmark the ship resumed service from June 1946 to April 1966, largely on its prewar route of Denmark and the Mediterranean, but including some periods of service to Britain. In April 1966 Tunis was sold to Eletson Maritime Corp., Piraeus, Greece then registered in Greece as Maria T. The ship was sold in 1972 to Rigas Bros. & Dinos Mitropoulis, Piraeus and renamed Mathios operating until 1978. The ship was scrapped in 1978.

== Construction ==
Tunis was constructed in 1935 by Helsingørs Jernskibs og Maskinbyggeri A/S, Elsinore, Denmark for Det Forenede Dampskibs Selskab (DFDS), Copenhagen, Denmark. The ship was the first of four almost identical ships built for DFDS. Tunis, hull 231 was followed by Marocco, hull 232, in 1936. In 1938 Algier, hull 251, and Sicilien, hull 252, were delivered. The later ships were nominally 100 DWT greater in capacity than the first two ships but with identical dimensions. (Note: Reference "Poulsen" contains a list of ships built by the shipyard, pages 155-161. Page 158 shows the two 1936 ships at 1,641 GRT, 2,400 DWT, 2,000 BHP with speed of 13 kn (15 mph; 24 km/h). The 1938 ships are respectively 1,654 GRT, 2,524 DWT (Algier)/2,525 DWT (Sicilien), 1,600 IHP with speed of 13 kn (15 mph; 24 km/h))

Laid down 10 August 1935 as yard hull number 231 the ship was launched 8 November 1935. Trials took place on 14 January 1936 with delivery to the company on 15 January. Tunis, signal OYJH, was a one deck vessel with a cruiser stern, 1,641 GRT, 925 NRT, 2,545 DWT 271.7 ft (82.8 m) registered length, 40.4 ft (12.3 m) beam and 16.6 ft (5.1 m) depth. Tunis was powered by a single 5 cylinder, 338 n.h.p. Burmeister & Wain 550-VF-90 type diesel engine driving one screw for a speed of 12.5 kn (14.4 mph; 23.2 km/h).

== Commercial service ==
Tunis was one of four similar cargo ships in commercial service for Det Forenede Dampskibs Selskab (DFDS), Copenhagen, operating between northwest Europe and the Mediterranean. On 18 January 1936 Tunis made a maiden voyage from Copenhagen to Antwerp. The ship then operated on a route from Copenhagen and Antwerp to the Mediterranean until beginning a Copenhagen to North America route in 1939/1940. The change was due to a surge in freight to North and South America at the start of war in Europe. All four of the new DFDS ships, Tunis, Marocco, Algier and Sicilien were put into Atlantic service. When Germany occupied Denmark on 9 April 1940 Tunis departed Copenhagen for New York arriving on 15 April 1930, days after the United States had declared seizure of Danish ships.

There was no Danish government in exile, the government completely subject to German influence, and Danish ships were thus considered by Britain and France to be enemy ships subject to seizure. Danish ships not seized by the belligerents sought refuge in neutral ports, particularly the United States. In New York a Danish Shipping Committee, without government powers, attempted to negotiate an "understanding" with representatives of the British and French governments without success. Under German pressure the Danish government ordered the ships in neutral ports to remain there and their crews to refuse any service including a law in Denmark prohibiting crews in neutral ports to sign on with other ships. The shortage of ships and crews among the Allied belligerents and neutral United States led to the United States seizing Danish ships on 30 March 1941. Denmark officially protested the seizure as against international law and demanding immediate return to no avail. In 1958 the United States offered Denmark $5,396,202 in settlement of claims for use and loss of all forty vessels including Tunis.

Tunis was one of forty Danish merchant vessels, totaling 142,641 GRT, seized by the United States Coast Guard and then requisitioned for use or transfer of title under the Ship Requisition Act. (Note: Public Law 101, Acquisition of Domestic or Foreign Merchant Vessels.) Most of the Danish ships were delivered to the War Shipping Administration (WSA), registered in Panama for diplomatic reasons, and operated under new names by commercial companies as WSA agents. (Note: The United States Maritime Commission in a letter dated August 20, 1941 appealed to Danish seamen "to serve the cause of democracy" by remaining with the vessels as crew.) Tunis was delivered to WSA in New York on 21 July 1941 and simultaneously chartered to Marine Operating Company, Inc. for operation. On 11 August 1941 WSA delivered the ship under Executive Order to the Navy under bareboat charter for operation as an transport.

== U.S. Navy service ==
The War Shipping Administration delivered the ship to the Navy under bareboat charter on 11 August 1941. The ship was renamed Aquila, designated AK-47, on 3 September 1941. After conversion for naval service by the Sullivan Drydock and Repair Corporation Aquila was commissioned on 24 October 1941.

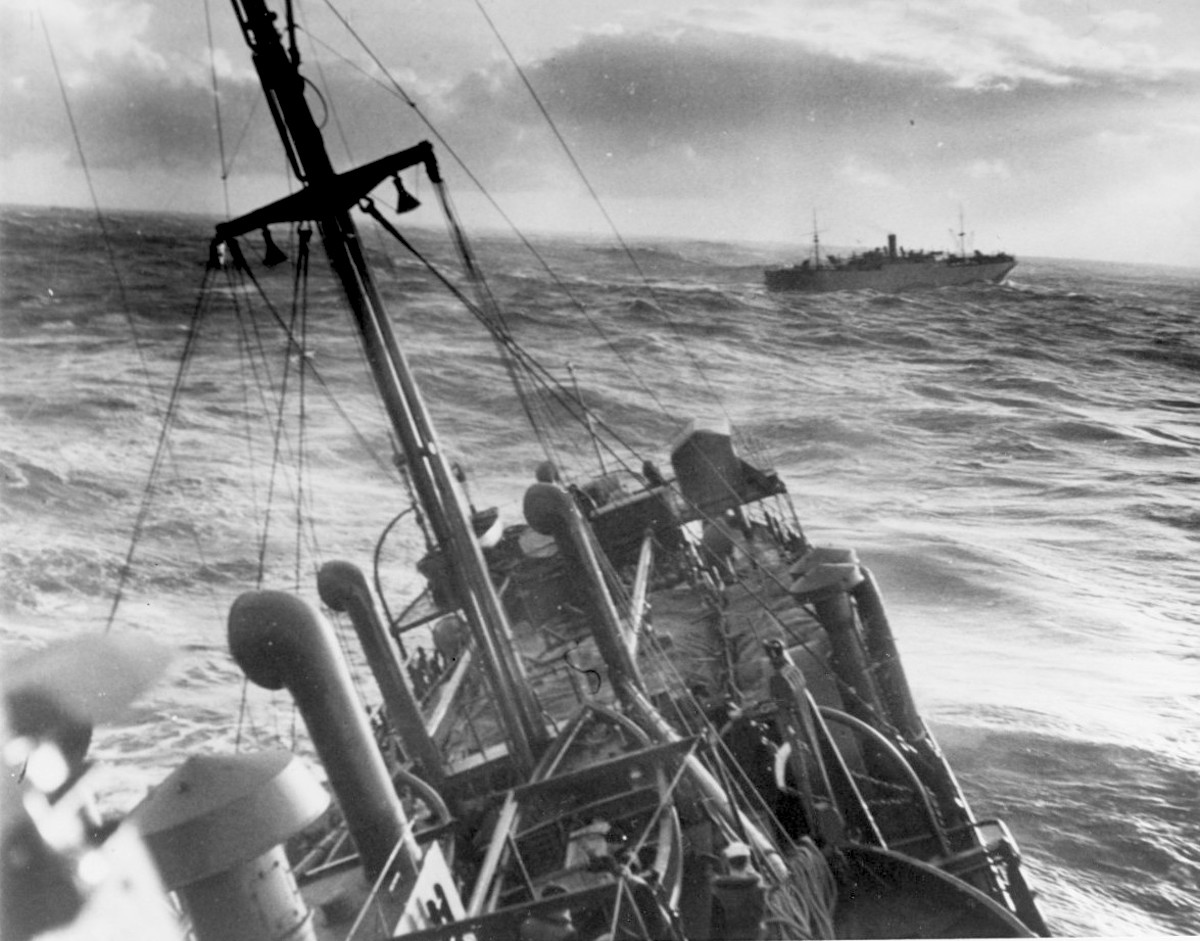
Aquila in convoy leaving Halifax, Nova Scotia, December 1941, view from sky lookout position. A Soviet transport is seen astern.

Aquila began a series of convoy runs from New York and Boston, Massachusetts, to Reykjavík, Iceland making five round-trips between 1 December 1941 and 10 October 1942. On 7 November 1942, she arrived at Norfolk, Virginia, to begin operations with the Naval Transportation Service assigned to supply operations between ports in the Eastern, Panama, Gulf, and Caribbean Sea Frontiers. Aquila followed this routine until she was placed out of commission at Norfolk, on 9 October 1945 with the name struck from the Navy list on 24 October 1945. The ship was returned to the Maritime Commission for disposal. Aquila's crew members were eligible for the following medals:

- American Defense Service Medal with "A" device
- American Campaign Medal
- European–African–Middle Eastern Campaign Medal
- World War II Victory Medal

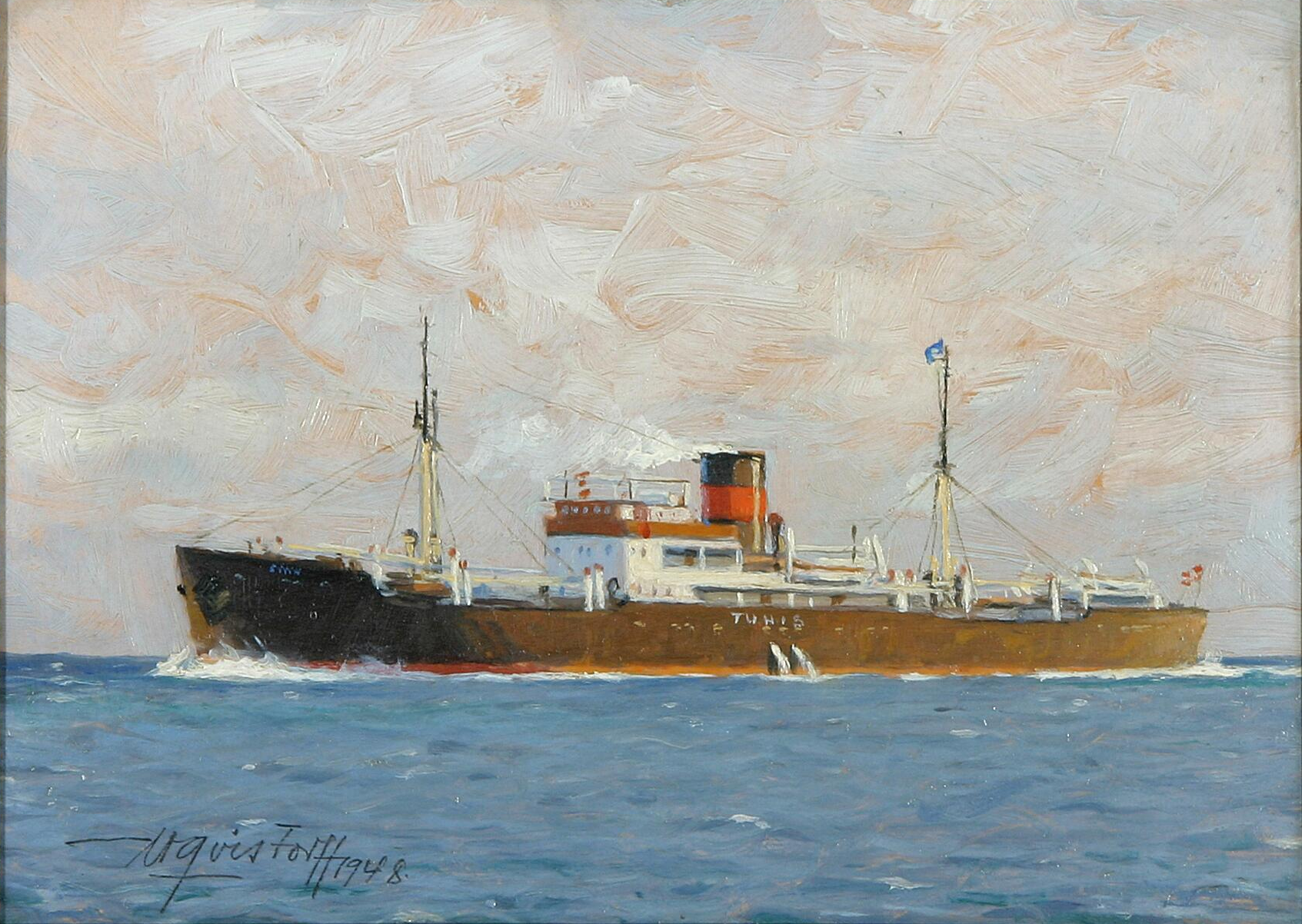
The Tunis back in service with DFDS. Painting by Victor Qvistorff from 1948.

== Return to commercial service ==
The ship was then placed under charter by Alcoa Steam Ship Co., at Portsmouth, Virginia, 9 October 1945, renamed Bonanza. Bonanza registration shows changes with 1,559 GRT, 821 NRT and signal WHXI owned by the War Shipping Administration registered in Baltimore.

The ship was returned at New York to DFDS, Denmark, on 25 June 1946, and resumed the name Tunis. On 28 June the ship departed New York for Newport News, Bremen and Copenhagen to resume pre-war routes. During the 1950s and early 1960s the ship included voyages between Copenhagen and Britain.

On 5 April 1966 Tunis was sold to Eletson Maritime Corp., Piraeus, Greece, delivered to the new owner on 13 April and renamed Maria T. In 1972 the ship was sold to Rigas Bros. & Dinos Mitropoulis, Piraeus and renamed Mathios. In 1978 the ship was scrapped in Greece by Kyriazis Brothers in 1978.

== See also ==
- USAT Sicilien

== Bibliography ==
- "Foreign Passenger and Cargo Ships Taken Over by U.S Maritime Commission during World War II". American Merchant Marine at War (USMM.org). 21 March 2011.
- Kauffmann, Henrik (22 May 1941). "The Danish Minister (Kauffmann) to the Secretary of State". United States Department of State, Office of the Historian, Foreign Service Institute.
- Lloyds (1938). "Lloyd's Register 1937-38" (PDF). Lloyd's Register.
- Lloyds (1942). "Lloyd's Register 1941-42" (PDF). Lloyd's Register.
- Lloyds (1946). "Lloyd's Register 1945-46" (PDF). Lloyd's Register.
- Lloyds (1942). "Lloyd's Register 1941-42". Lloyd's Register.
- Maritime Administration. "Bonanza". Ship History Database Vessel Status Card. U.S. Department of Transportation, Maritime Administration.
- Naval History And Heritage Command (18 June 2015). "Aquila I (AK-47)". Dictionary of American Naval Fighting Ships. Naval History And Heritage Command.
- Priolo, Gary P. (5 March 2021). "USS Aquila (AK-47)". NavSource.
- Perkins (11 September 1941). "The Chargé in Denmark (Perkins) to the Secretary of State". United States Department of State, Office of the Historian, Foreign Service Institute.
- Poulsen, Hanne (2016). "HELSINGØR VÆRFT 1882-1982" (PDF). M/S Museet for Søfart. Helsingør, Denmark: Museet for Søfart.
- Roberts, Stephen S. (10 January 2010). "Class: AQUILA (AK-47)". ShipScribe.
- Skjøtt, Bernt (2021). "M/S Tunis". Færgejournalen.
- Denmark, Claims: Compensation for Requisitioning and Use or Loss of Danish Vessels During World War II. United States Treaties and Other International Agreements. Vol. 9. Washington, D.C.: United States Department of State. 1958. pp. 1088–1089.
