= Iqaluit Airport =

Airport serving Iqaluit, Nunavut, Canada

Iqaluit Airport ᐃᖃᓗᖕᓂ ᒥᑦᑕᕐᕕᒃ
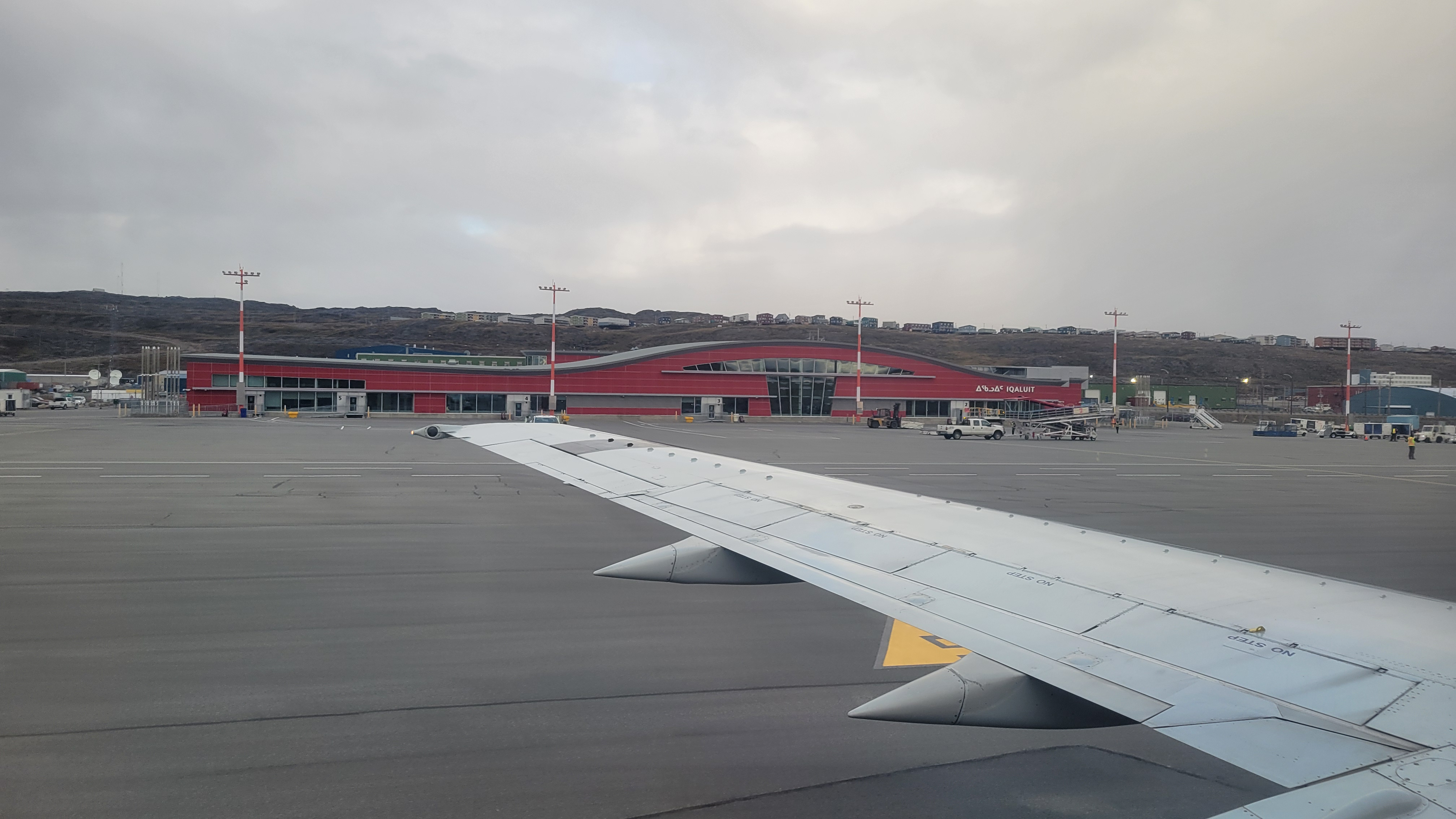
- Terminal building
- IATA: YFB; ICAO: CYFB; WMO: 71909

Summary
- Airport type: Public
- Owner: Government of Nunavut
- Operator: Nunavut Airport Services Ltd.
- Location: Iqaluit, Nunavut
- Hub for: Canadian North
- Time zone: EST (UTC−05:00)
  - Summer (DST): EDT (UTC−04:00)
- Elevation AMSL: 110 ft (34 m)
- Coordinates: 63°45′24″N 068°33′22″W

Map
- Location within Nunavut

Runways
Direction	Length		Surface
Direction	m	ft	Surface
16/34	2,623	8,605	Asphalt

Statistics (2019)
- Passengers: 172,000
- Aircraft movements (2025): 18,249
- Sources: Canada Flight Supplement; Environment Canada; Movements from Statistics Canada

Iqaluit Airport (Inuktitut: ᐃᖃᓗᖕᓂ ᒥᑦᑕᕐᕕᒃ) (IATA: YFB, ICAO: CYFB) is an airport in Iqaluit, Nunavut, Canada. It hosts scheduled passenger service from Ottawa, Rankin Inlet, and Kuujjuaq on carriers such as Canadian North, and from smaller communities throughout eastern Nunavut. It is also used as a forward operating base by the Royal Canadian Air Force (RCAF). In 2011, the terminal handled more than 120,000 passengers.

The airport is classified as an airport of entry by Nav Canada and is staffed by the Canada Border Services Agency (CBSA). CBSA officers at this airport can handle general aviation aircraft only, with no more than 15 passengers.

The airport serves as a diversion airport on polar routes.

The airport is owned by the Government of Nunavut (GN) and operated, under a 30-year contract, by Nunavut Airport Services. The company is a subsidiary of Winnipeg Airport Services Corporation, which in turn is a subsidiary of Winnipeg Airports Authority.

== History ==
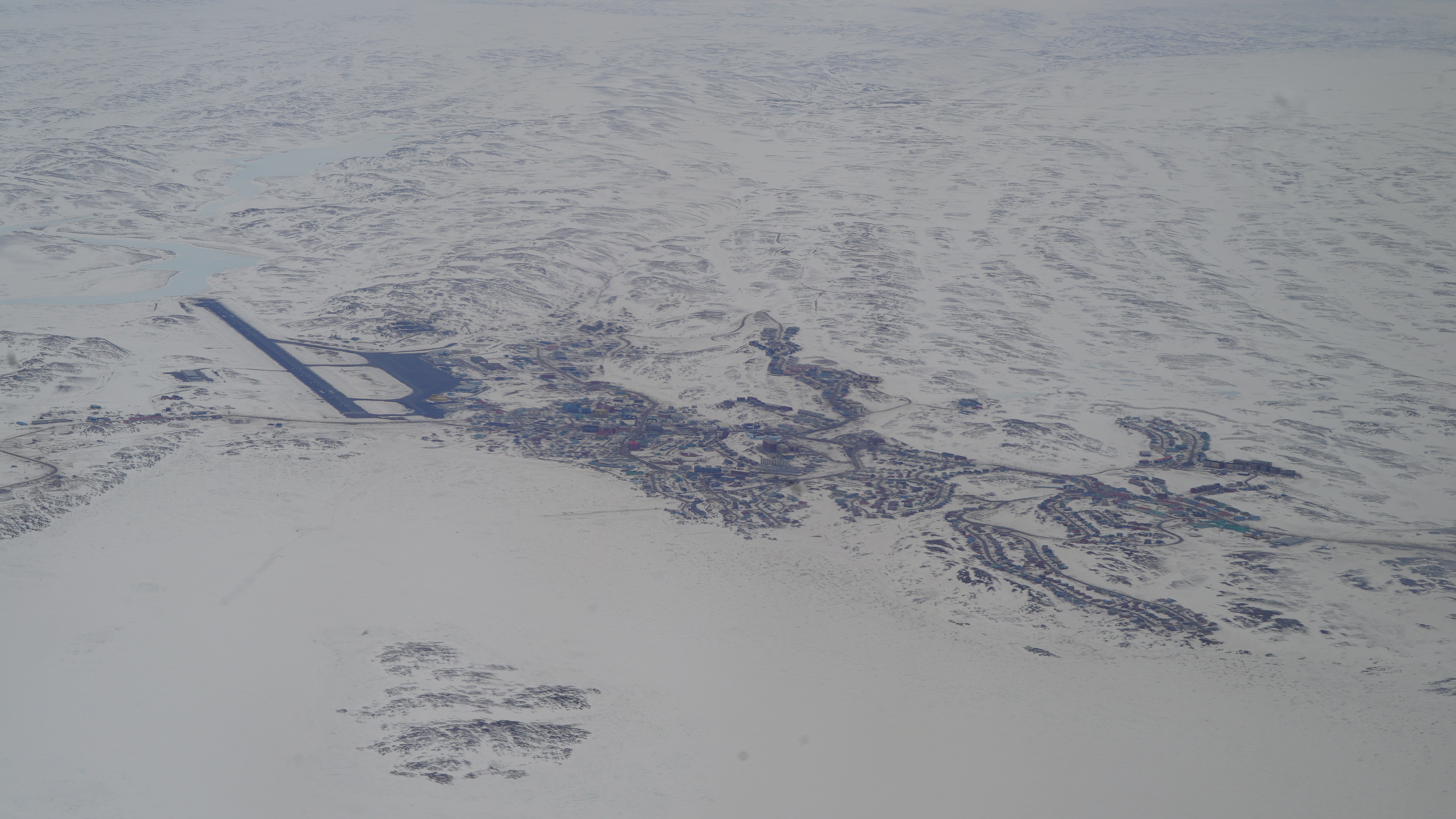
Aerial view

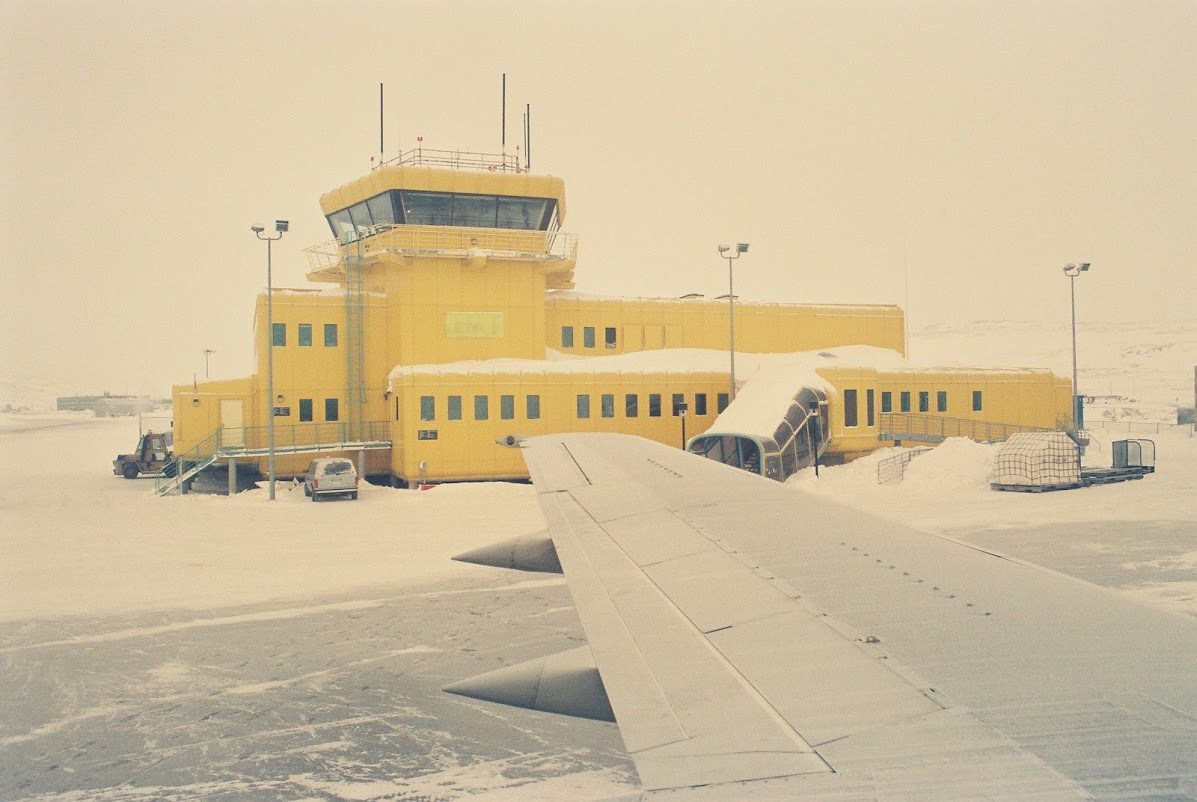
Old terminal which was closed in 2017

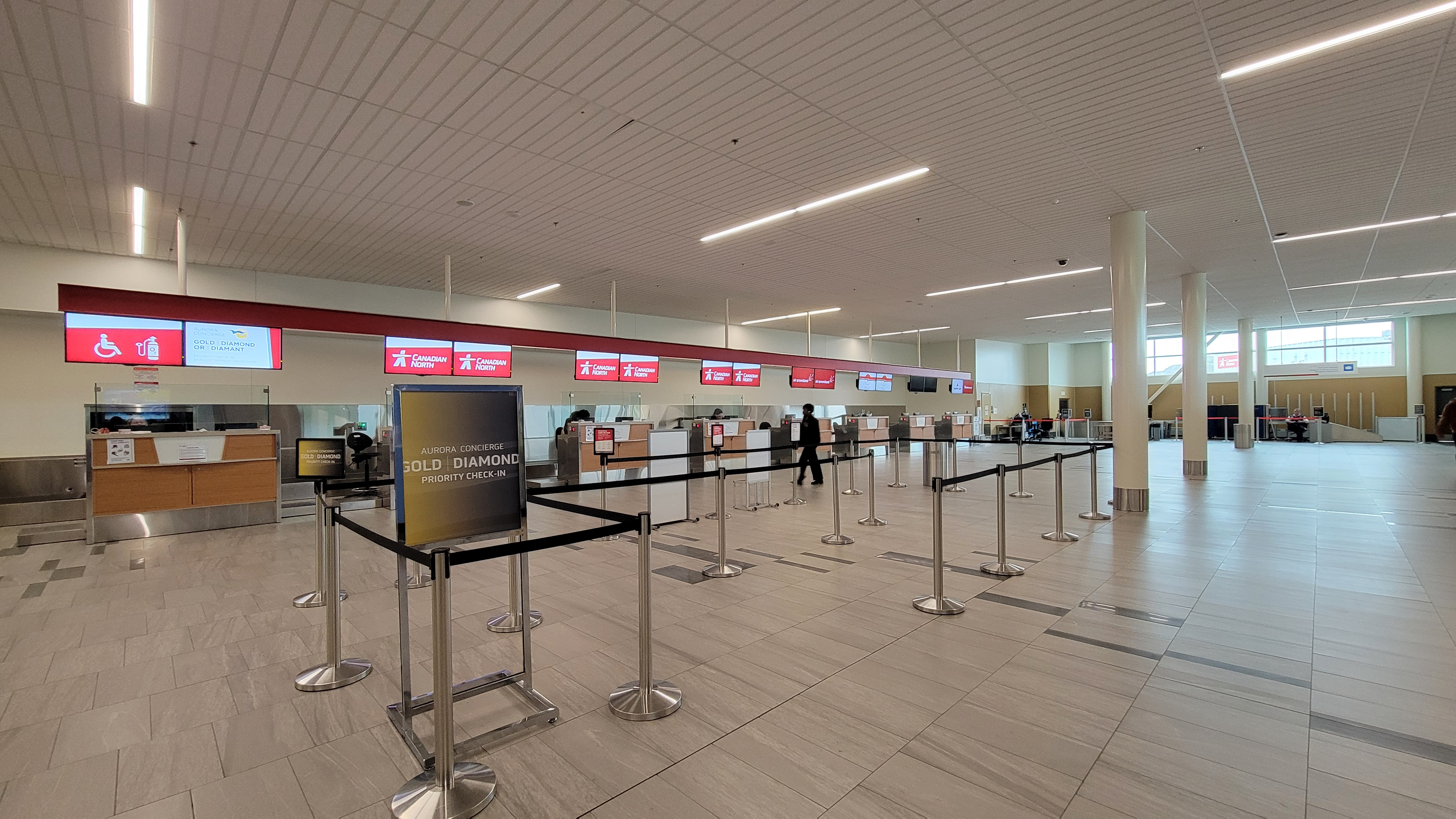
Check in area

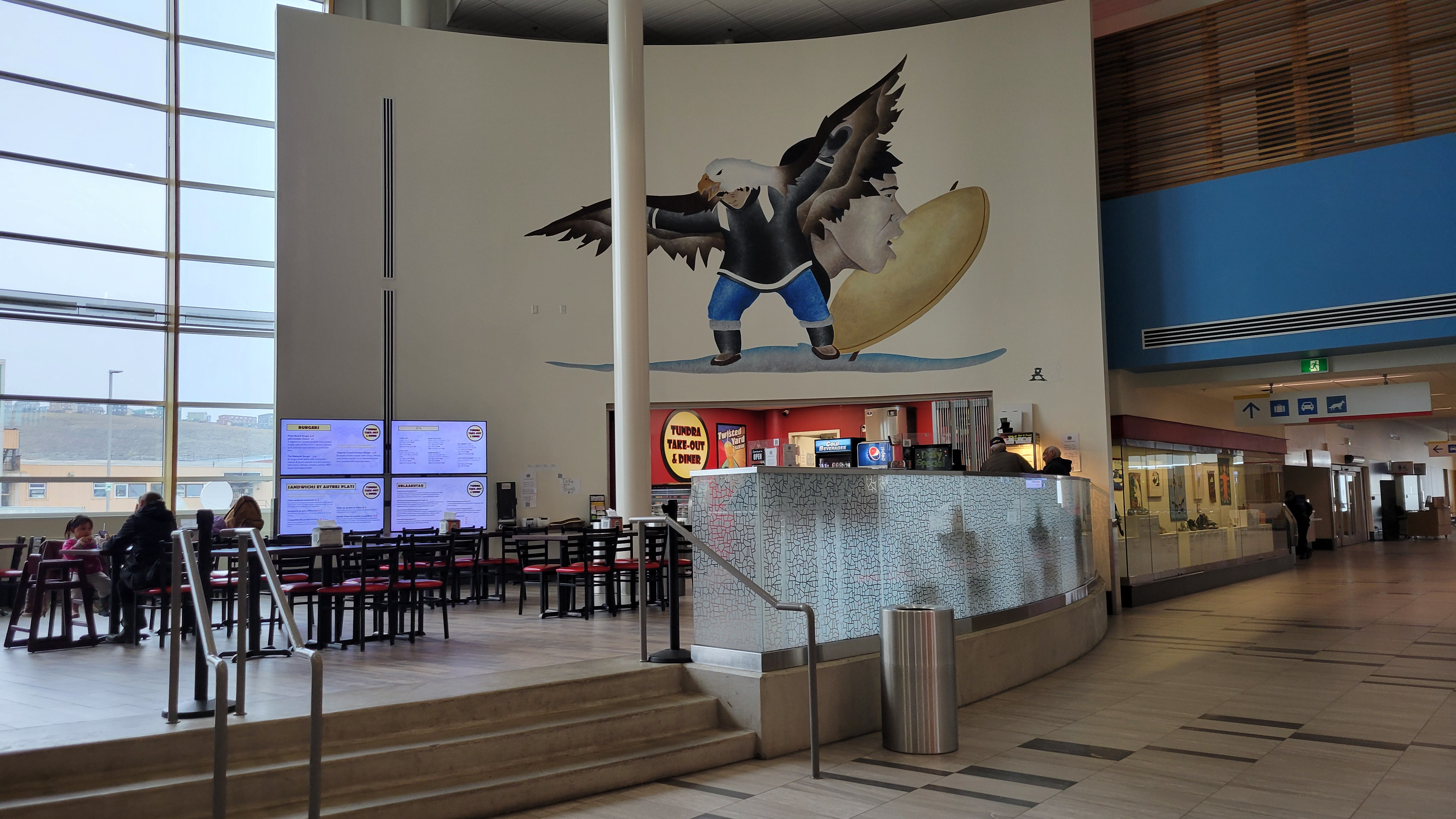
Dining area

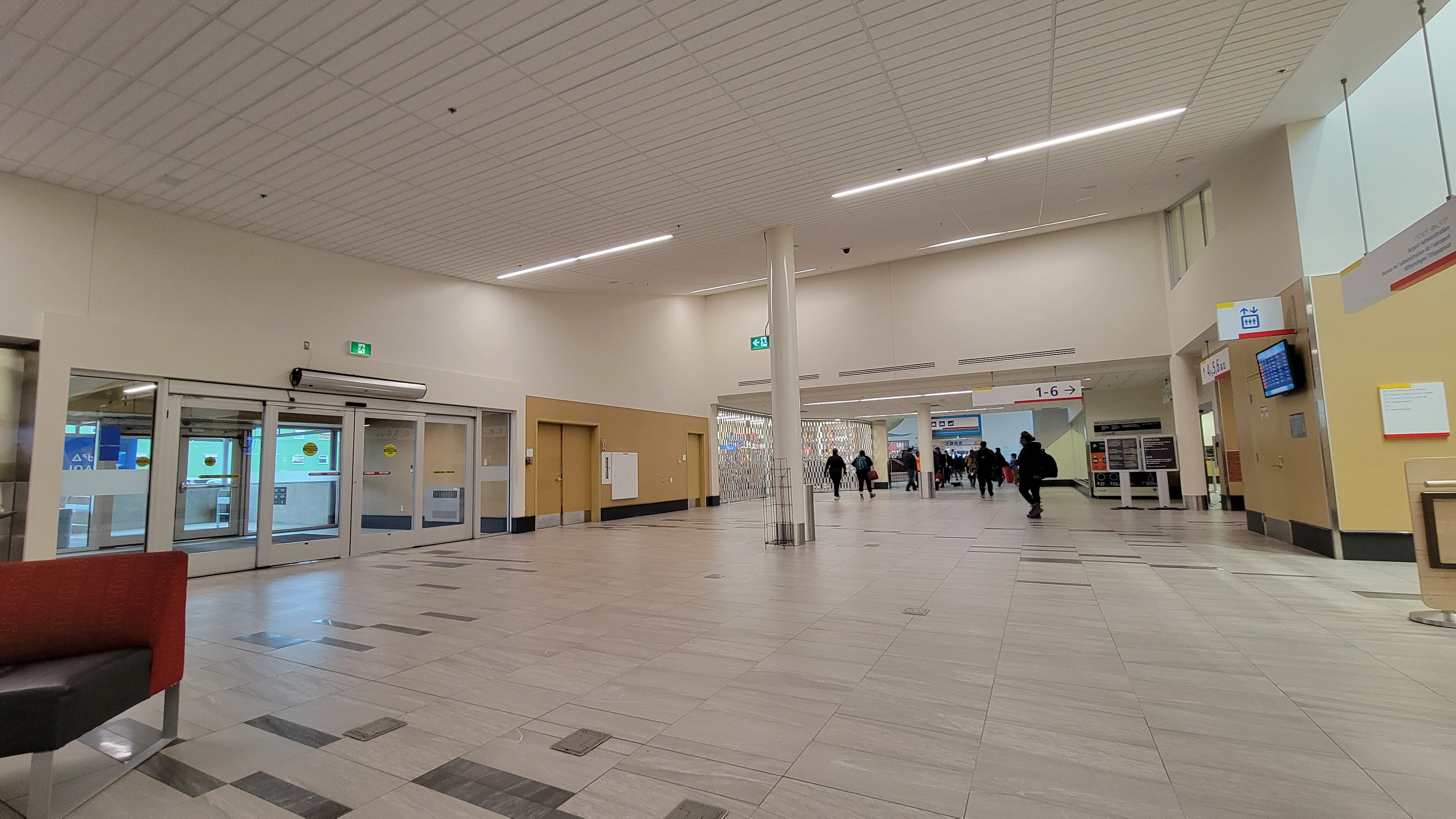
Departure area

=== Military use ===
During late July 1941, a United States Army Air Forces (USAAF) team headed by Captain Elliott Roosevelt investigated the Frobisher Bay region for a potential airport for use in trans-Atlantic air traffic. Roosevelt's report designated a marginal site at Cape Rammelsberg for later construction. In mid-October, trawlers Lark, Polarbjoern, and Selis reached the vicinity, but owing to inaccurate charts (dating from the 1865 expedition of Charles Francis Hall) could not find the Roosevelt site. Instead, an eight-man crew commanded by USAAF Captain John T. Crowell was offloaded on a smaller island "about eight miles southeast of the headland Captain Roosevelt had recommended." They operated a weather/radio station over the winter. The expedition reported that "this island is reported to be some 400 feet high and very level on top providing a natural runway of more than a mile in length." The ships left on 5 November.

When the station relief and base construction expedition arrived next July, both the Crowell and Roosevelt sites were rejected in favour of a level meadow discovered along the Sylvia Grinnell River on mainland Baffin Island. On 30 July, ships Polaris and Effie M. Morrissey anchored in what was then called Koojesse Inlet and began surveying the area: "The terrain was excellent, with level ground extending nearly the entire 6,000 feet needed for an ample runway...The harbor, readily accessible from the bay, offered a good anchorage for ships of any size that would come in." The expedition consisted further of the USCGC Bear, equipped with a seaplane, the transports Fairfax and Eleanor and some smaller vessels. Having offloaded the airport construction crews and materials, the expedition left at the end of September.

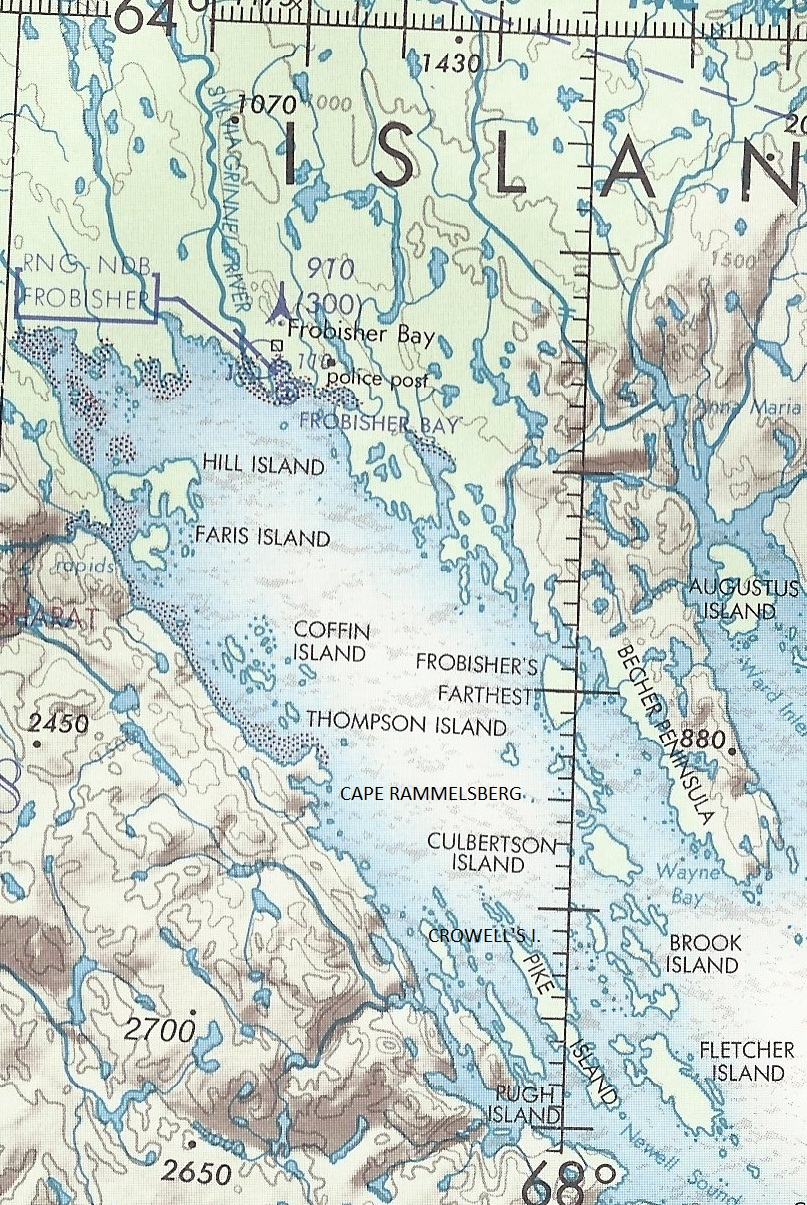
Frobisher Bay airport approaches with original station sites noted. USDOD ONC D-15, 1971

=== World War II ===
By summer of 1943, the airbase at Koojesse Inlet had "grown to look like a populous village" and was in use by many aircraft. It was designated Crystal II and referred to as Chaplet in coded communications. It was one of three "Crystal" weather sites in the Canadian Arctic Region, Fort Chimo (now Kuujjuaq), Quebec, being "Crystal I", and a station on Padloping Island being "Crystal III". A detachment of the 8th Weather Squadron, Air Transport Command (ATC), took up residence at the station on October 1, 1942. The initial mission of the Crystal sites was to provide long-range weather information to the combat forces then building up in the United Kingdom.

As part of the Crimson East air route network, the airfield at Crystal II was referred to by USAAF Air Transport Command as ATC Station #10. It was intended to be a transport hub between the Eastern Route, which originated at Presque Isle Army Airfield, Maine, and the Central Route, which originated at Romulus Army Airfield (Detroit Metropolitan Airport), Michigan. The original plan, briefed by Captain Roosevelt to USAAF Chief Henry "Hap" Arnold and others at the Atlantic Conference in August 1941, called for Frobisher Bay to be a node in a northern alternate air route, running from Churchill, Manitoba, via Southampton Island over Frobisher to Bluie West Eight and Bluie East Two in Greenland, rejoining the main route in Iceland. The later success of the main air route via Bluie West One and the spring 1943 victory in the Battle of the Atlantic led to cancellation of the Crimson project in late 1943, and the associated airfields were reduced to weather, communications, and logistics duties.

The air base initially had 2 runways, first was 6,000 feet (1,800 m) paved and the second was 5,000 feet (1,500 m) gravel. The shorter of the two was used briefly and decommissioned by 1944 for use as storage. Today the former runway is a commercial area along Akilliq roadway.

The use of Frobisher Bay declined with the end of World War II, with jurisdiction of the facility being transferred to Military Air Transport Service (MATS) in 1948, under its Air Weather Service. During the 1950s it continued to be used as a transit point by the United States and Canada as RCAF Frobisher Bay Station. The base was closed in 1963 and converted into a civilian airport.

=== Civilian use ===
Beginning in 1957, Pan American and Trans World Airlines used Frobisher Bay as a refueling stop for flights between the U.S. West Coast and London. There were plans at the time to make the airport into a hub for air traffic between North America and Europe. However, with the introduction of the intercontinental Boeing 707 and Douglas DC-8, fewer airlines stopped at the airport. Frobisher Bay remained prominent as a regional airport, continued in its strategic role of sustaining the Distant Early Warning Line (DEW), supported the occasional military exercise or scientific expedition, and was a key stopover on the North Atlantic ferry route.

Through the 1960s, Nordair was the main airline serving Frobisher Bay from Montreal, 1,100 nautical miles (2,000 km; 1,300 mi) to the south. Douglas DC-4s operated into the 1970s and Lockheed Super Constellations between 1964 and 1969. In 1968, Nordair introduced the Boeing 737-200 on the Frobisher Bay run. At the same time, Bradley Air Services had been expanding. By the 1970s, the company's fleet of de Havilland Canada DHC-6 Twin Otters and Douglas DC-3s was serving many small Arctic communities from YFB, carrying passengers, mail, groceries, and other essentials. Bradley became known as First Air in 1973 and soon added BAe 748s.

In the 1980s, Canada's airline industry was in transition, with Air Canada and Canadian Airlines rapidly buying up regional operators. Air Canada acquired Nordair in 1977, and then sold it in 1984 to Canadian Airlines. Jet service to Iqaluit Airport continued, but under the Canadian North banner, which was, after the buyout of Canadian Airlines by Air Canada, to continue operations as an independent airline, jointly owned by the Inuit of the Northwest Territories and Nunavut. Between 1985 and 1988, First Air added four Boeing 727s to link Montreal and Ottawa with Iqaluit. Meanwhile, Canadian Airlines failed, and was taken over by Air Canada in 2000. In 1995, First Air purchased the small Yellowknife-based carrier, Ptarmigan Airways; then, in 1997, Northwest Territorial Airways (NWT Air), Air Canada's Yellowknife subsidiary. In acquiring NWT, First Air obtained two 737-200 Combis and a Lockheed 382 Hercules.

== Facilities ==
- 2 hangar/cargo terminals (Canadian North) - hangar was terminal building until 1986
- 1 two-storey terminal building c. 1986
- 1 main runway
- three aprons
- 1 FBO (Frobisher Bay Touchdown Services)
- administration and control tower (former terminal)

Iqaluit International Airport Fire Department operates one crash tender for local fire suppression and has support from Iqaluit Fire Department when needed.

== Terminal ==
The main terminal was constructed c.1986 and had become outdated as a result of increased traffic, limited airside waiting area and subsiding taxiway, the Nunavut government planned an overhaul of the airport that was expected to cost $250–300 million. The project was a public–private partnership with the GN borrowing their half of the cost. Nunavut Airport Services will operate the airport for 30 years. Upgrades included:

- new 100,000 ft^{2} (9,300 m^{2}) terminal building constructed by Bouygues
- retrofitting the current terminal which will become solely an administration building and control tower
- expanding parking lots
- new combined services building to house all airport and safety vehicles
- a second taxiway
- apron and repaving the runway.

The construction began in 2014 and was completed on August 8, 2017, with flight service beginning the following day. On September 5, 2015, during construction, a large fire caused major damage to the roof of the new terminal, costing an estimated $1 million. Aside from the fire, other challenges encountered in the construction include thawing permafrost, electricity demands, housing for construction workers, extreme cold temperatures and short daylight hours in winter, and advanced planning to take advantage of summer sea lifts to lower the delivery cost of construction materials.

== Other information ==
Over the years several international flights have been diverted to Iqaluit due to technical reasons, air rage or on-board medical emergencies with no deaths being reported. On 31 May 1996, Virgin Atlantic flight 7 from London to Los Angeles made an emergency landing at Iqaluit after a passenger had a heart attack. The landing was executed safely – the first Boeing 747 ever to attempt to land at Iqaluit – but one of the 747's engines hit a fuel pump on the ramp as it was taxiing, causing serious damage to the aircraft and a potentially dangerous fuel spill. The 397 stranded passengers, including singer Gary Barlow, were flown out after Virgin Atlantic chartered two jets. The passengers, after spending 16 hours in a local curling rink, were taken to New York to catch connecting flights to Los Angeles. Prince Michael of Kent, who had also been on the flight, was given a Royal Canadian Mounted Police escort and departed on an earlier scheduled flight. The original aircraft had its engines repaired and left four days after the accident. The heart-attack victim survived.

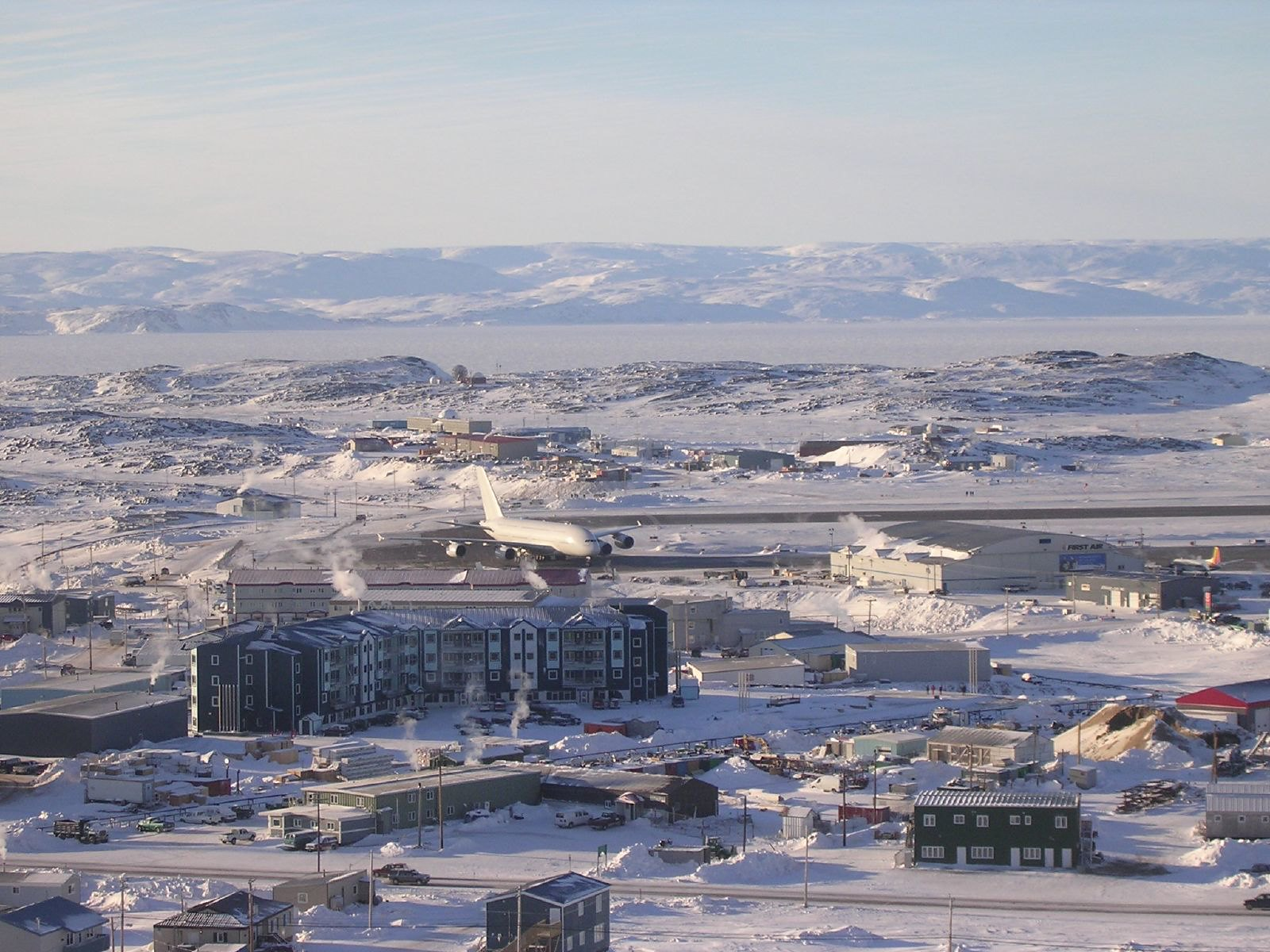
Airbus A380 at Iqaluit

The Airbus A380, the world's largest passenger jet, conducted cold weather testing from Iqaluit Airport during February 2006 – its first North American visit. They were hoping to experience −25 °C (−13 °F) weather to determine the effects on cabin temperatures and engine performance. Nunavut authorities hoped that the importance of these tests would put Iqaluit on the map as a centre for cold-weather testing. In February 2013, Airbus Military used the airport to test the Airbus A400M Atlas military transport aircraft. The city government sent a delegation to Paris Airshow in June 2013 to promote Iqaluit as an ideal location for these tests. Airbus A350 followed suit and conducted its cold weather testing in January 2014. Airport staff cited low landing fee, sufficient runway length, and minimal air traffic movement all helped in the decision making. Following from these previous successful visits by prototype Airbus aircraft, the company sent the first A320neo with CFM International LEAP engines to be tested in January 2016. As part of the type's first visit to North America, the jet performed several circuits in the subzero temperatures before departing back to Toulouse–Blagnac Airport.

In December 2005 the Government of Nunavut announced that it would spend $40 million to repair the runway, build a new emergency services facility and a new terminal. Air Canada had operated services to Ottawa and Montreal from March 2010 to August 1, 2011.

In January 2012 Air Greenland announced that a 1-hour, 45-minute flight from Nuuk to Iqaluit, down from three days when going via Copenhagen or Reykjavik and then on to Ottawa, would begin 18 June 2012, later changed to 15 June. The service was a partnership with First Air who provided ticketing and other services in Iqaluit. This was the first international flight into Iqaluit since 2001 when First Air discontinued its Iqaluit to Kangerlussuaq flights. Air Greenland used Dash 8 aircraft on the run. After three years in place the service was discontinued for the 2015 season. Air Greenland, with Canadian North providing connections to Ottawa, Montreal and Kuujjuaq, will relaunch a route between Nuuk and Iqaluit during the 2024 summer. The once-weekly route, which starts June 26 and ends October 23, will be served by Dash 8. Air Greenland indicated that if the route was successful it could be extended beyond the October 23 date.

Iqaluit International Airport won a National Award for Engineering Project or Achievement in 2018 from Engineers Canada.

== Airlines and destinations ==
=== Passenger ===
Airlines	Destinations
Air Greenland	Seasonal: Nuuk
Canadian North	Arctic Bay, Clyde River, Igloolik, Kimmirut, Kinngait, Kuujjuaq, Ottawa, Pangnirtung, Pond Inlet, Qikiqtarjuaq, Rankin Inlet, Resolute Bay, Sanirajak, Yellowknife

=== Cargo ===
Airlines	Destinations
Canadian North	Ottawa
Cargojet Airways	Hamilton (ON), Ottawa, Rankin Inlet, Winnipeg

== Accidents and incidents ==
- On 12 February 1973, Douglas C-47A C-FOOV of Kenting Atlas Aviation crashed on approach. The aircraft was on a ferry flight to Resolute Bay Airport when power was lost shortly after take-off from Iqaluit and the decision was made to return. All three people on board survived.
- On 14 August 1996, a Canadian Forces CF-18 Hornet left the runway during takeoff, slid down an embankment and ruptured a fuel pipeline. The aircraft caught fire, as did fuel spilling from the pipeline, however the pilot had ejected just as the plane left the runway and only suffered a broken ankle. The pipeline was shut down and the fire brought under control in less than an hour.
