= 545th Test Group =

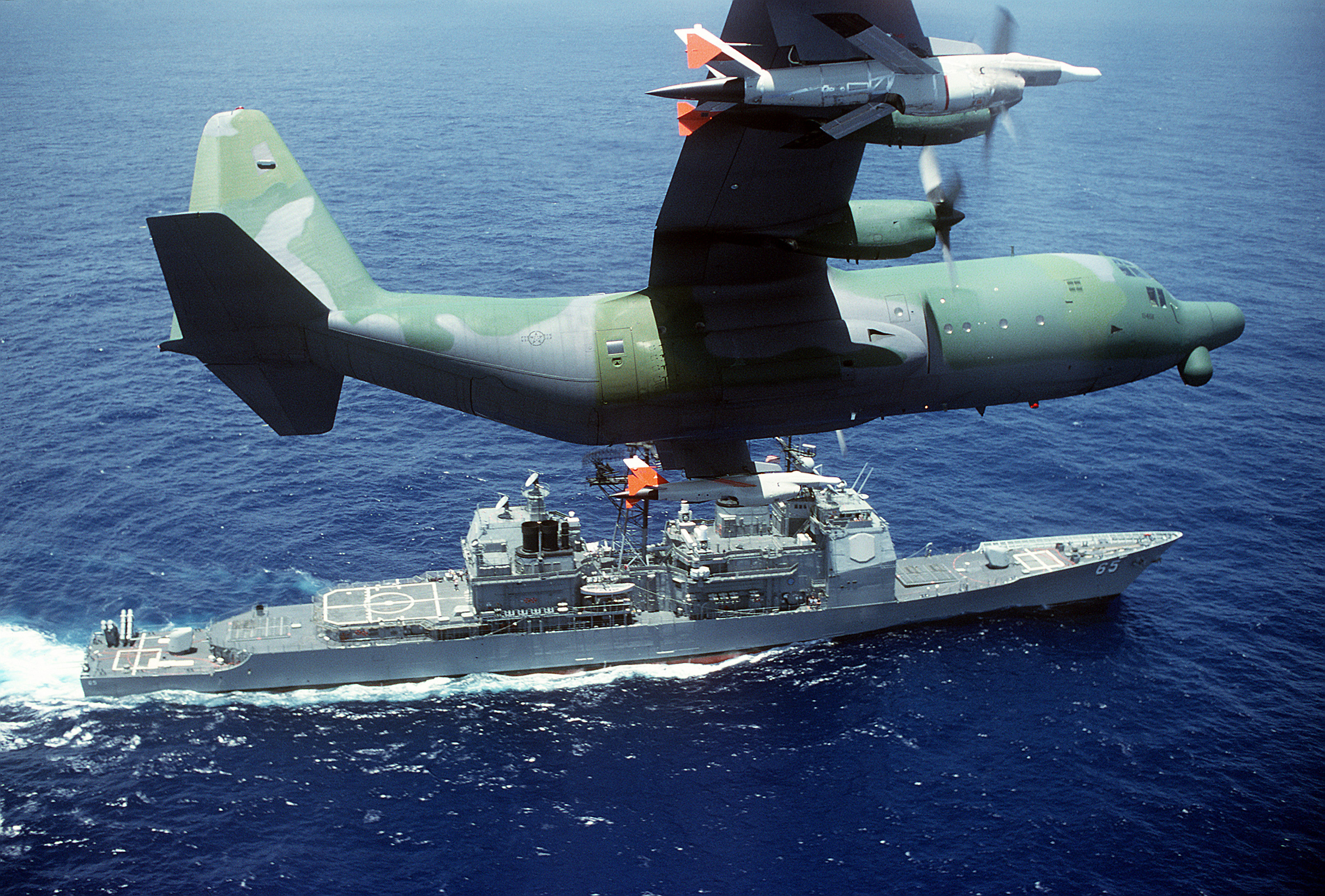
- DC-130 Hercules of the 6514th Test Squadron drone control with a pair of AQM-34 Firebees
- Active: 1942-1944; 1979-1996
- Country: United States
- Branch: United States Air Force
- Role: Test operations
- Decorations: Air Force Outstanding Unit Award

Insignia
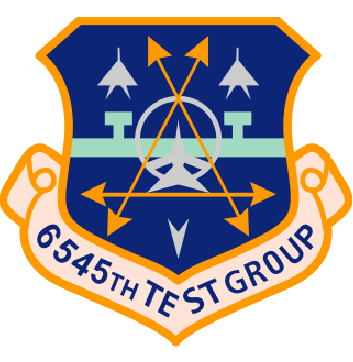
- 6545th Test Group (later 545th Test Group) emblem

The 545th Test Group is an inactive group of the United States Air Force. It was organized at Hill Air Force Base, Utah as the 6545th Test Group in January 1979 to manage the Utah Test and Training Range and the development of unmanned aerial vehicles. In 1994, it transferred its flight testing mission to Ogden Air Logistics Center, and in 1996 the 388th Fighter Wing assumed its range management, and the group was inactivated.

In October 1992, the group was consolidated with the 545th Tactical Airlift Group, formerly the 5th Ferrying Group, a World War II unit of the United States Army Air Forces (AAF). It was activated in February 1942 as the California Sector, Ferrying Command, but soon changed its name. It ferried aircraft manufactured in the Southwestern United States until March 1944, when it was disbanded in a general reorganization of AAF units in the United States. It was replaced by the 556th Army Air Forces Base Unit, which continued its mission until August 1946. The group was reconstituted in 1985 as the 545th Tactical Airlift Group, but was not active under that designation.

== History ==
=== World War II ===
The group's origins can be traced to 3 January 1942, when Air Corps Ferrying Command, in the aftermath of the attack on Pearl Harbor divided its Domestic Division into six sectors. The Midwest Sector was established at Hensley Field, Texas and was responsible for ferrying aircraft from the Boeing, Cessna, and Beechcraft factories in Wichita, Kansas; the Douglas Aircraft factory in Tulsa, Oklahoma; the North American Aviation plants in Dallas, Texas and Kansas City, Missouri; the Consolidated Aircraft factory at Fort Worth and the Glenn L. Martin Company factory in Omaha, Nebraska. The bulk of this work consisted in flying new planes from the plant to modification centers in the US. On 18 February, this office was formally organized as a unit, the Midwest Sector, Ferrying Command and Ferrying Command's Domestic Division became the Domestic Wing, Air Corps Ferrying Command.

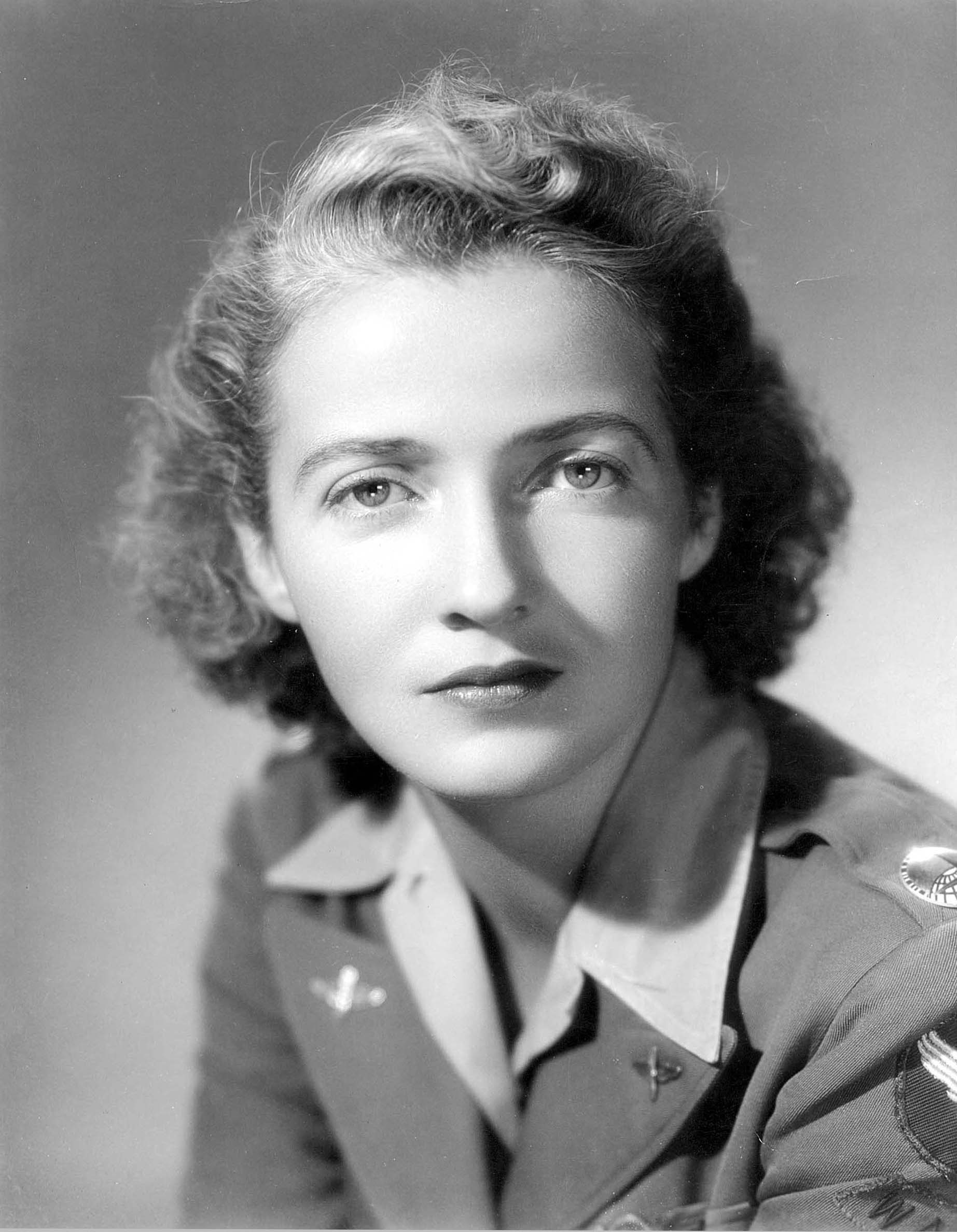
Nancy Love

In April 1942, the group was assigned its first operational units, the 2nd, 11th and 16th Air Corps Ferry Squadrons. Ferrying Command requested the AAF to reorganize its sectors as groups, with assigned squadrons. Accordingly, the sector became the 5th Ferrying Group on 26 May 1942. In September 1942, the group moved to Love Field, Texas. There, it added the 62nd Ferrying Squadron before the end of the year. On 16 January 1943, the 2nd Squadron moved to Fairfax Field, Kansas, where it joined with the 24th Transition Training Detachment there to form the cadre for the 33rd Ferrying Group. The 91st Ferrying Squadron was activated on 30 May 1943. The final addition to the group was a detachment of the Women's Auxiliary Ferrying Squadron (WAFS). It was the second to be formed after the group attached to the 2nd Ferrying Group and was led by the first commander of the WAFS, Nancy Love. The 5th was selected with the idea that the WAFS pilots would be able to fly basic and advanced trainers, such as the North American AT-6 Texan. After flying one of the first deliveries of an AT-6 by a WAFS pilot, Ms. Love moved to the 4th Ferrying Group at Long Beach Army Air Field, California. Although the women pilots were initially limited to acting as copilots or flying small aircraft, they eventually flew essentially every plane in the AAF inventory.

By 1944, the Army Air Forces (AAF) was finding that standard military units like the 6th Group, whose manning was based on relatively inflexible tables of organization were not well adapted to support missions. Accordingly, the AAF adopted a more functional system in which each base was organized into a separate numbered unit. As part of this reorganization the group was disbanded on 31 March 1944 along with its subordinate units and its resources were absorbed by the 555th Army Air Forces Base Unit (5th Ferrying Group) which was designated and organized on the same day. The base unit was redescribed as the 555th AAF Base Unit (Ferrying Group) then discontinued after the end of World War II on 15 August 1946.

The 5th Ferrying Group was reconstituted and redesignated the 545th Tactical Airlift Group on 31 July 1985, but remained inactive until it was consolidated as a test group in 1992.

=== Test operations ===
The 6545th Test Group was activated on 1 January 1979 at Hill Air Force Base, Utah. It provided operational management of the Utah Test and Training Range through its 6501st Range Squadron (later 501st Range Squadron). It not only tested developing weapons systems, but conducted training for combat aircrews The 6514th Flight Test Squadron (later 514th Flight Test Squadron) moved from Edwards Air Force Base, California to join the group at Hill. The 514th used Lockheed DC-130 Hercules and HC-130H Hercules, Sikorsky NCH-53A, and Bell HH-1H Twin Huey aircraft to support the development of unmanned aerial vehicles. It also provided airlift support.

The 6545th Group was consolidated with the 545th Group on 1 October 1992 as the 545th Test Group. In September 1995, the group's test mission was transferred to the Ogden Air Logistics Center. The following year, the 388th Fighter Wing assumed the range mission and the group was inactivated.

== Lineage ==
5th Ferrying Group

- Constituted as the Midwest Sector, Ferrying Command on 14 February 1942 (Note: Some references use "Middle West" Sector.)

Activated on 18 February 1942
Redesignated Midwest Sector, Domestic Wing, Ferrying Command on 25 April 1942
Redesignated 5th Ferrying Group, Domestic Wing, Ferrying Command on 26 May 1942
Redesignated 5th Ferrying Group on 20 May 1943
Disbanded on 31 March 1944

- Reconstituted and redesignated 545th Tactical Airlift Group on 31 July 1985

Consolidated with the 6545th Test Group as the 545th Test Group on 1 October 1992

545th Test Group

- Designated as the 6545th Test Group and activated on 1 January 1979

Consolidated with the 545th Tactical Airlift Group as the 545th Test Group on 1 October 1992
Inactivated on 31 December 1997

=== Assignments ===
- Domestic Wing, Air Corps Ferrying Command (later Ferrying Division, Air Transport Command), 18 February 1942 – 31 March 1944
- 6510th Test Wing (later 412th Test Wing), 1 January 1979
- Imnknown 1 August 1996 – 31 December 1997

=== Components ===
- 2nd Air Corps Ferry Squadron (later 2nd Ferrying Squadron), 15 April 1942 – 31 March 1944
- 11th Air Corps Ferry Squadron (later 11th Ferrying Squadron), 16 April 1942 – 31 March 1944ref name=11ASfacts/>
- 16th Air Corps Ferry Squadron (later 16th Ferrying Squadron), 16 April 1942 – 31 March 1944
- 62nd Ferrying Squadron, C. December 1942 – 31 March 1944
- 91st Ferrying Squadron, 30 May 1943 –31 March 1944
- 347th Air Base Squadron, (later 347th Base Headquarters & Air Base Squadron): c. 28 May 1942 – 31 March 1944
- 501st Range Squadron (see 6501st Range Squadron)
- 514th Test Squadron (later 514th Flight Test Squadron) (see 6514th Test Squadron)
- 6501st Range Squadron (later 501st Range Squadron), 1 January 1979 – 1 August 1996
- 6514th Test Squadron (later 514th Test Squadron, 514th Flight Test Squadron), 1 January 1979 – 30 Sep 1995
- 24th Sub Depot: c. 1 January – 31 March 44
- 883rd Military Police Company, Aviation (later 883rd Guard Squadron): c. 9 June 1942 – c. 8 September 1942
- 1042nd Guard Squadron: c. 8 September 1942 – 31 March 1944
- 391st AAF Band (later 691st Army Band, 691st AAF Band), 20 January 1943 – 31 March 1944

=== Stations ===
- Hensley Field, Texas, 18 February 1942
- Love Field, Texas, 8 September 1942 – 31 March 1944
- Hill Air Force Base, Utah, 1 January 1979 – 1 October 1997

=== Awards and campaigns ===
Award streamer	Award	Dates	Notes
	Air Force Outstanding Unit Award	1 January 1982 – 31 December 1983	6545 Test Group
	Air Force Outstanding Unit Award	1 January 1984 – 31 December 1984	6545 Test Group
	Air Force Outstanding Unit Award	1 January 1985 – 31 December 1986	6545 Test Group
	Air Force Outstanding Unit Award	1 January 1996 – 31 December 1996	545 Test Group
	Air Force Outstanding Unit Award	1 January 1997 – 31 December 1997	545 Test Group

Campaign Streamer	Campaign	Dates	Notes
	American Theater without inscription	18 February 1942 – 31 March 1944	California Sector, air Corps Ferrying Command (later 6th Ferrying Group)
