= List of major bases and units of Tactical Air Command =

Major Tactical Air Command bases and Units in the Continental United States 1946 - 1992

This is a list of major Tactical Air Command (TAC) bases and units located in the Continental United States that were assigned to TAC between 1946 and 1992.

== Bases and units ==
- Altus AFB, Oklahoma
  (11 June 1952 – 21 June 1954)
  63d Troop Carrier Group/Wing
- Bergstrom AFB, Texas
  (22 March 1946 – 1 December 1948, 1 July 1957 – 1 October 1958,
  1 July 1966 – 1 June 1992)
  27th Fighter Wing (1957–1958)
  75th Reconnaissance Wing (1966–1971)
  67th Reconnaissance Wing (1971–1992)
- Blytheville AFB, Arkansas
  (15 April – 15 August 1946, 1 July 1954 – 1 April 1958)
  461st Tactical Bombardment Wing (1954–1958)
- Bunker Hill AFB, Indiana
  (22 June 1954 – 1 September 1957)
  323d Fighter Wing
- Biggs AFB, Texas
  (29 July 1946 – 1 December 1948)
  20th Fighter Group
- Brooks AFB, Texas
  (23 March 1946 – 13 January 1947)
  363d Reconnaissance Group
- Clovis/Cannon AFB, New Mexico
  (23 July 1951 – 1 June 1992)
  37th Fighter Wing (1953)
  50th Fighter Wing (1953)
  312th Fighter Wing (1954–1959)
  27th Fighter Wing (1959–1992)
  57th Fighter Weapons Wing (1970–1972)
- Charleston AFB, South Carolina
  (23 April 1952 – 1 March 1955)
  456th Troop Carrier Group/Wing
- Davis-Monthan AFB, Arizona
  (1 October 1976 – 1 June 1992)
  355th Fighter Wing
- Donaldson AFB, South Carolina
  (16 October 1950 – 20 July 1951)
  375th Troop Carrier Wing (1950)
  443d Troop Carrier Wing (1950–1951)
- Dow AFB, Maine
  (20 November 1946 – 1 December 1948)
  14th Fighter Group
- Dover AFB, Delaware
  (1 April 1946 – 1 December 1948)
  320th AAF/Air Force Base Unit
- Dyess AFB, Texas
  (15 October 1969 – 1 December 1974)
  516th Tactical Airlift Wing (1969–1972)
  463d Tactical Airlift Wing (1972–1974)
- Alexandria/England AFB, Louisiana
  (21 March 1946 – 1 December 1948, 1 December 1950 – 1 June 1992)
  366th Fighter Wing (1953–1959)
  1st Air Commando/Special Operations Wing (1966–1969)
  23d Fighter Wing (1972–1992)
- Eglin AFB, Florida
  (10 July 1968 – 1 June 1992)
  33d Fighter Wing
- Forbes AFB, Kansas
  (10 July 1968 – 1 December 1974)
  313th Tactical Airlift Wing
- George AFB, California
  (15 November 1951 – 1 June 1992)
  1st Fighter Group (1950–1951)
  479th Fighter Wing (1952–1971)
  21st Fighter Wing (1953–1954)
  31st Fighter Wing (1959–1962)
  355th Fighter Wing (1962–1964)
  8th Fighter Wing (1964–1965)
  35th Fighter Wing (1971–1992)
- Goodman AFB, Kentucky
  (1 December 1951 – 1 December 1952)
  348th Fighter Group/Wing
- Grenier AFB, New Hampshire
  (1947–1949)
  82nd Fighter Group
- Hill AFB, Utah
  (23 December 1975 – 1 June 1992)
  388th Fighter Wing
- Holloman AFB, New Mexico
  (1 January 1971 – 1 June 1992)
  366th Fighter Wing (1963–1966)
  49th Fighter Wing (1968–1992)
  479th Tactical Training Wing (1977–1992)
- Homestead AFB, Florida
  (1 July 1968 – 1 June 1992)
  31st Fighter Wing (1970–1992)
- Hurlburt Field, Florida
  (1 February 1955 – 26 June 1958, 1 July 1962 – 1 June 1992)
  17th Air Base Group (1955–1958)
  4420th Combat Support Group (1962–1972)
  1st Air Commando/Special Operations Wing (1962–1966, 1972–1992)
- Langley AFB, Virginia
  (1 May 1946 – 1 December 1948, 1 December 1950 – 1 June 1992)
  31st Fighter Group (1947)
  363d Reconnaissance Group/Wing (1947–1948, 1950–1951)
  47th Bombardment Wing (1951–1953)
  405th Fighter Wing (1953–1958)
  4505 Air Refueling Wing (1958–1963)
  463d Troop Carrier Wing (1963–1966)
  316th Tactical Airlift Wing (1966–1974)
  1st Fighter Wing (1975–1992)
  2nd Aircraft Delivery Group (1969-1994)
- Little Rock AFB, Arkansas
  (1 April 1970 – 1 December 1974)
  64th Tactical Airlift Wing (1970–1971)
  63d Tactical Airlift Wing (1971–1974)
- Lockbourne AFB, Ohio
  (1 July 1947 – 1 December 1948, 10 July 1968 – 31 August 1971)
  332d Fighter Group (1947–1948)
  317th Tactical Airlift Wing (1968–1971)
- Luke AFB, Arizona
  (1 July 1958 – 1 June 1992)
  405th Tactical Training Wing
- MacDill AFB, Florida
  (1 July 1962 – 1 June 1992)
  12th Fighter Wing (1962–1975)
  15th Fighter Wing (1962–1970)
  1st Fighter Wing (1970–1975)
  56th Fighter Wing (1975–1992)
- March AFB, California
  (1 April 1946 – 1 December 1948)
  1st Fighter Group (1946–1948)
  67th Reconnaissance Group (1947–1948)
- McChord AFB, Washington
  (1 April 1946 – 1 December 1948)
  62d Troop Carrier Group
- McConnell AFB, Kansas
  (1 July 1963 – 1 July 1972)
  355th Fighter Wing (1963–1964)
  23d Fighter Wing (1964–1972)
- Moody AFB, Georgia
  (1 September 1947 – 1 December 1948, 1 December 1975 – 1 June 1992)
  347th Fighter Wing (1975–1992)
- Mountain Home AFB, Idaho
  (1 January 1966 – 1 June 1992)
  67th Reconnaissance Wing (1966–1971)
  347th Fighter Wing (1971–1972)
  366th Fighter Wing (1972–1992)
- Myrtle Beach AFB, South Carolina
  (1 April 1946 – 1 November 1947, 1 April 1956 – 1 June 1992)
  342d Fighter-Day Wing (1956)
  354th Fighter Wing (1956–1992)
- Nellis AFB, Nevada
  (1 July 1958 – 1 June 1992)
  4520th Air Base Group (1958–1969)
  57th Fighter Weapons Wing (1969–1992)
  474th Fighter Wing (1968–1992)
- Otis AFB Massachusetts
  (1 December 1950 – 2 June 1951, 1 July 1969 – 31 May 1972)
  50th Fighter Group (1950–1951)
  1st Special Operations Wing (1969–1972)
- Pope AFB, North Carolina
  (1 April 1946 – 1 December 1948, 1 December 1950 – 1 December 1974)
  10th Reconnaissance Group (1946–1948)
  44115th Air Base Group (1950–1954)
  464th Troop Carrier Wing (1954–1971)
  317th Tactical Airlift Wing (1971–1974)
  1st Special Operations Wing (1969–1974)
- Sewart AFB, Tennessee
  (1 November 1948 – 1 December 1948, 1 December 1950 – 31 May 1971
  314th Troop Carrier Wing (1948, 1950–1966)
  463d Troop Carrier Wing (1959–1963)
  64th Troop Carrier/Tactical Airlift Wing (1966–1971)
- Seymour Johnson AFB, North Carolina
  (6 January 1956 – 1 June 1992)
  83d Fighter-Day Wing (1956–1957)
  4th Fighter Wing (1957–1992)
- Shaw AFB, South Carolina
  (1 December 1950 – 1 June 1992)
  20th Fighter Group (1947–1948, 1950–1951)
  363d Reconnaissance/Fighter Wing (1951–1992)
  66th Reconnaissance Wing (1953)
  432d Reconnaissance Group/Wing (1953–1963)
- Tonopah Airport Nevada
  (UNK - 1 June 1992)
  4450th Tactical Group (1982–1989)
  37th Fighter Wing (1989–1992)
- Turner AFB, Georgia
  (4 September 1947 – 1 December 1948, 1 December 1950 - 1958)
  348th Fighter Group (1951)
  31st Fighter Wing (1947–1958)
- Tyndall AFB, Florida
  (21 March – 15 May 1946, 1 October 1979 – 1 June 1992)
  5000th Aerodrome Group (1946)
  325th Tactical Training Wing (1979–1992)
- Whiteman AFB, Missouri
  (21 March 1946 – 14 December 1947)
  322d AAF/AF Base Unit
- Williams AFB, Arizona
  (1 July 1958 – 1 October 1960)
  4530th Air Base Group

Notes:

- Aerospace Defense Command (ADC) Air National Guard bases/units merged into ADTAC on 1 October 1979 not included.
- Howard AFB Canal Zone/Panama (24th Composite Wing) was assigned to TAC 1 January 1976 – 31 December 1999.
- Keflavik Airport Iceland (57th Fighter Interceptor Squadron) was transferred to TAC from ADC 1 October 1979. Transferred to Air Combat Command 1 June 1992.
