= 517th Training Group =

517th Training Group

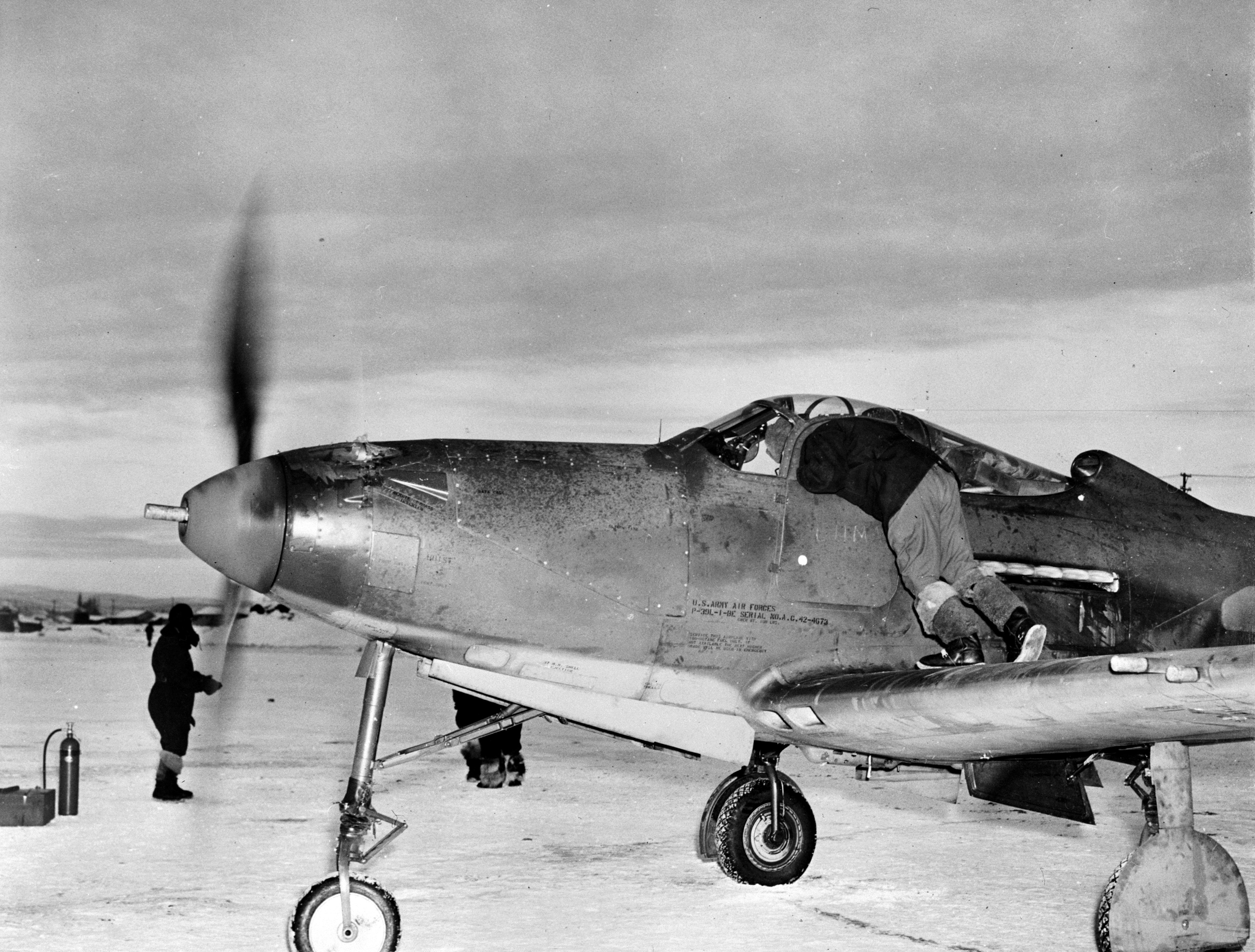
- P-39 Airacobra being ferried to the Soviet Union over the ALSIB route
- Active: 1942–1944; 2009–present
- Country: United States
- Branch: United States Air Force
- Role: language training
- Part of: Air Education and Training Command
- Garrison/HQ: Presidio of Monterey
- Decorations: Air Force Outstanding Unit Award

Commanders
- Current commander: Colonel Jennifer L. Saraceno

Insignia
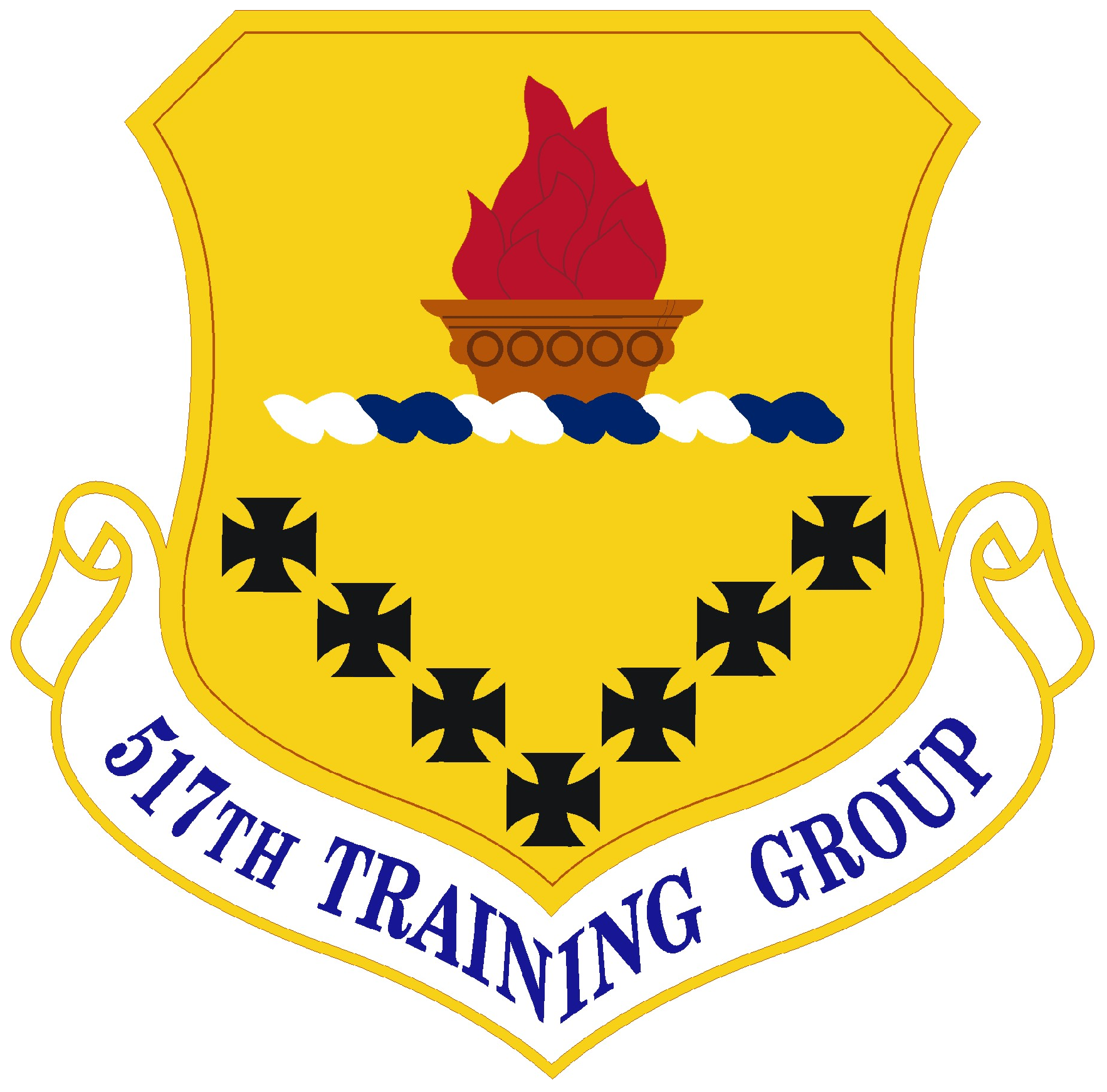
- 517th Training Group emblem (Note: Approved 12 Nov 2010.)

The 517th Training Group is a group of the United States Air Force. It conducts language training and is assigned to the 17th Training Wing at Goodfellow Air Force Base, Texas. It is stationed at the Presidio of Monterey, California. It was activated in its present form on 14 May 2009. During World War II, the group was the 7th Ferrying Group, ferrying combat aircraft from factories in the United States to Alaska for onward transfer to the Soviet Union via the ALSIB air route.

== Mission ==
The group conducts language training for United States Air Force personnel at the Defense Language Institute (DLI) centers at the Presidio of Monterey, California and Washington, DC through its two assigned training squadrons. It also provides administrative support to Air Force personnel assigned to language training.

== History ==
=== World War II ===
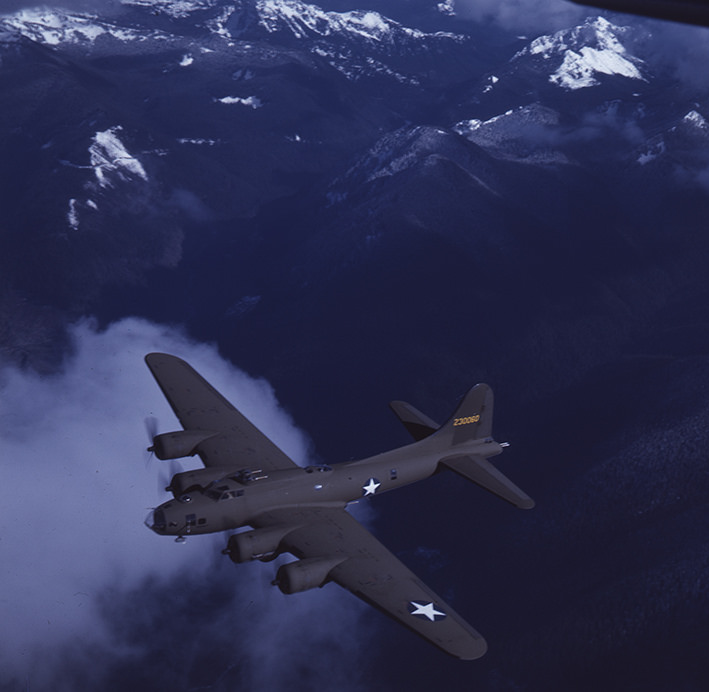
B-17F Flying Fortress in flight near Seattle inb 1943

The group's origins can be traced to 3 January 1942, when Air Corps Ferrying Command, in the aftermath of the attack on Pearl Harbor divided its Domestic Division into six sectors. The Northwest Sector was established at Boeing Field in Seattle, Washington and was responsible for ferrying Boeing aircraft produced there. The bulk of this work consisted in flying new Boeing B-17 Flying Fortress bombers from the plant to modification centers in the US. On 21 February, this office was formally organized as a unit, the Northwest Sector, Ferrying Command and Ferrying Command's Domestic Division became the Domestic Wing, Air Corps Ferrying Command. Unlike the other sectors activated at the same time, no air base squadron was initially authorized for the Northwest Sector, although a single squadron, the 7th Ferrying Squadron was. At the end of February, Ferrying Command entered into a contract with Northwest Airlines for service to Fairbanks, Alaska across Canada.

Ferrying Command requested the AAF to reorganize its sectors as groups, with assigned squadrons. Accordingly, the sector became the 7th Ferrying Group on 26 May 1942. Shortly after this, the group moved to Gore Field, Montana, where it would be able to superintend the Northwest Staging Route. As operations expanded, experienced pilots from the 3rd and 6th Ferrying Groups along with new graduates from flying schools were added to the group. The group's 90th Ferrying Squadron was located at Great Falls Army Air Base.

In October 1941, Averell Harriman had met with senior Soviet officers and had committed to the delivery of 1800 fighters and Medium bombers to the Soviet Union by the end of fiscal year 1942 (30 June 1942). The US continued to commit to a fixed number of aircraft deliveries to the Soviet Union through 1943, with any manufacturing shortfalls reducing deliveries elsewhere. Early deliveries were made across the Atlantic and Africa, then through Iran, but by early 1942, the Soviets had approved a route through Alaska and Siberia (ALSIB), originating at Gore Field. In early June 1942, Major Lloyd Earl, the group's executive officer conducted a survey to examine facilities between Great Falls, Montana and Fairbanks.

In mid July, bases were established or expanded across Alberta, British Columbia, and Alaska. On 11 July, the 25th Ferrying Squadron was activated at Gore Field. The group began to ferry aircraft to the Soviet Union over the Northwest Staging Route. The first Douglas A-20 Havoc deliver via the ALSIB took place in September 1942, while the first fighters, Curtiss P-40 Warhawks were delivered the following month. In addition to delivery flights, the group also flew missions to transport supplies and construction equipment for bases and facilities along the route. However, it became apparent that having a unit in the United States managing the entire route, including construction and maintenance was not practical, In November 1942, control of the Canadian stations on the route was transferred to the Alaskan Wing, Air Transport Command along with over 600 members of the 7th Group scattered along the route. The group then once more focused on its ferrying mission. However, the group continued to manage the route's southern terminal at Gore Field

By 1944, the Army Air Forces (AAF) was finding that standard military units like the 7th Group, whose manning was based on relatively inflexible tables of organization were not well adapted to support missions. Accordingly, the AAF adopted a more functional system in which each base was organized into a separate numbered unit. As part of this reorganization the group was disbanded on 31 March 1944 along with its subordinate units and its resources were absorbed by the 557th Army Air Forces Base Unit (7th Ferrying Group) which was designated and organized on the same day. The base unit was redescribed as the 557th AAF Base Unit (Ferry Group) then discontinued after the end of World War II on 14 December 1945.

The 7th Ferrying Group was reconstituted and redesignated the 517 Tactical Group on 31 July 1985, but remained inactive.

=== Language training ===
The group was then redesignated the 517th Training Group on 21 April 2009. It was activated on 14 May 2009 at the Presidio of Monterey, California. The group includes organic support capabilities, including an operational medical element, Chaplain Corps and other administrative and technical support functions. The group commander also serves as the Assistant Commandant of the Defense Language Institute (DLI) Foreign Language Center.

Its operating components are the 311th and 314th Training Squadrons. The group trains more than two thousand Air Force enlisted students in foreign language skills. It trains airmen in 16 languages at Monterey, and in 65 languages at the DLI site in Washington, DC. The group also continuously develops training methods and processes to develop linguists.

Air Force graduates of the Defense Language Institute serve as cryptologic linguists, Foreign Area Officers, presidential translators and Air Force Office of Special Investigations agents. Additionally, graduates participate in the Language Enabled Airman Program, the Olmsted Scholar Program, and foreign professional military education and exchange programs.

== Lineage ==
- Constituted as the Northwest Sector, Ferrying Command on 14 February 1942

Activated on 21 February 1942 (Note: The Administrative History gives the date for activation of the sectors as 18 February 1942. Administrative History, p. 68.)
Redesignated Northwest Sector, Domestic Wing, Ferrying Command on 25 April 1942
Redesignated 7th Ferrying Group, Northwest Sector, Domestic Wing, Ferrying Command on 26 May 1942
Redesignated 7th Ferrying Group on 20 May 1943
Disbanded on 31 March 1944

- Reconstituted and redesignated 517th Tactical Group on 31 July 1985
- Redesignated 517th Training Group on 21 April 2009

Activated on 14 May 2009

=== Assignments ===
- Domestic Wing, Air Corps Ferrying Command (later Ferrying Division, Air Transport Command), 21 February 1942 – 31 March 1944
- 17th Training Wing, 14 May 2009 – present

=== Components ===
- 7th Ferrying Squadron: 24 March 1942 – 31 Mar 1944 (Note: Haulman gives the assignment date as 18 February 1942, the date the 7th Squadron was constituted and the date in the Administrative History for the sector's activation. However, the squadron was not activated until 24 March. The AFHRA factsheet for the 517th Group indicates the squadron was not assigned until 10 February 1943. Robertson, Factsheet 517 Training Group. The Administrative History states that one squadron was constituted in February 1942 for assignment to the Northwest Sector and that by April, "the squadrons constituted on 18 February were activated." p. 96.)
- 25th Ferrying Squadron: 11 July 1942 – 31 Mar 1944
- 90th Ferrying Squadron (Great Falls Army Air Base): 10 April 1943 – 31 Mar 1944
- 307th Ferrying Squadron: 18 June 1943 – 31 May 1944
- 311th Training Squadron: 14 May 2009 – present
- 314th Training Squadron: 14 May 2009 – present
- 384th Base Headquarters & Air Base Squadron: 11 July 1942 – 31 March 1944
- 34th Sub Depot: c. 1 January – 31 March 44

=== Stations ===
- Seattle, Washington, 21 February 1942
- Gore Field, Montana, 22 June 1942 – 31 Mar 1944
- Presidio of Monterey, California, 14 May 2009 – present

=== Awards and campaigns ===
Award streamer	Award	Dates	Notes
	Air Force Outstanding Unit Award	1 July 2009 – 30 June 2011	517th Training Group
	Air Force Outstanding Unit Award	1 July 2013 – 30 June 2015	517th Training Group
	Air Force Outstanding Unit Award	1 July 2015 – 30 June 2017	517th Training Group
	Air Force Outstanding Unit Award	1 July 2017 – 30 June 2019	517th Training Group
	Air Force Outstanding Unit Award	1 July 2019 – 30 June 2020	517th Training Group

Campaign Streamer	Campaign	Dates	Notes
	American Theater without inscription	21 February 1942 – 31 March 1944	Northwest Sector, air Corps Ferrying Command (later 7th Ferrying Group)
