= 3rd Ferrying Group =

3rd Ferrying Group (later 533rd Tactical Airlift Group)
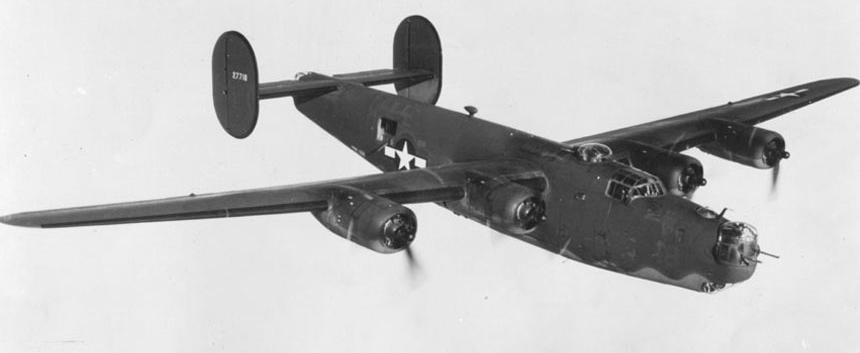
- Consolidated B-24 Liberator as constructed at the Ford Willow Run plant
- Active: 1942–1944
- Country: United States
- Branch: United States Army Air Forces; Reconstituted 1985 as part of United States Air Force
- Role: Aircraft ferrying
- Part of: Domestic Wing, Air Corps Ferrying Command

The 3rd Ferrying Group was a World War II unit of the United States Army Air Forces (AAF). It was activated in February 1942 as the Detroit Sector, Ferrying Command in February 1942, but soon changed its name. It ferried aircraft manufactured in the midwest until March 1944, when it was disbanded in a general reorganization of AAF units in the United States. It was replaced by the 553rd Army Air Forces Base Unit, which continued its mission until spring 1947.

The group was reconstituted in 1985 as the 533rd Tactical Airlift Group, but has not been active since.

== World War II ==
The group's origins can be traced to 3 January 1942, when Air Corps Ferrying Command, in the aftermath of the attack on Pearl Harbor divided its Domestic Division into six sectors. The Detroit Sector was established at Wayne County Airport, Michigan and was responsible for ferrying aircraft from the Curtiss-Wright Corporation factory at Columbus, Ohio, the Ford Motor Company factory in Ypsilanti, Michigan (Willow Run), and the Bell Aircraft and Curtiss-Wright factories in Buffalo, New York. The bulk of this work consisted in flying new planes from the plants to modification centers in the US. On 18 February, this office was formally organized as a unit, the Detroit Sector, Ferrying Command and Ferrying Command's Domestic Division became the Domestic Wing, Air Corps Ferrying Command.

In April 1942, the group was assigned its first operational unit, the 5th Air Corps Ferry Squadron. At this time, Ferrying Command had requested the AAF to reorganize its sectors as groups, with assigned squadrons. Accordingly, the sector became the 3rd Ferrying Group on 26 May 1942. Shortly thereafter, the 19th Squadron joined the group in June. The group expanded in 1943 with the addition of the 60th, 74th and 306th Ferrying Squadrons. The group was also one of the units selected to use Women's Auxiliary Ferrying Squadron pilots to ferry aircraft. Although initially intended to be limited to acting as copilots or flying small aircraft, these women pilots eventually flew essentially every plane in the AAF inventory. (Note: The Women's Auxiliary Ferrying Squadron pilots should not be confused with the Women Airforce Service Pilots program.)

By 1944, the AAF was finding that standard military units like the 6th Group, whose manning was based on relatively inflexible tables of organization were not well adapted to support missions. Accordingly, the AAF adopted a more functional system in which each base was organized into a separate numbered unit. As part of this reorganization the group was disbanded on 31 March 1944 along with its subordinate units and its resources were absorbed by the 553rd Army Air Forces Base Unit (3rd Ferrying Group) which was designated and organized on the same day. The base unit was redescribed as the 553rd AAF Base Unit (Ferrying Group) then discontinued after the end of World War II on 1 December 1946.

The 3rd Ferrying Group was reconstituted and redesignated the 533rd Tactical Airlift Group on 31 July 1985, but remained inactive.

== Lineage ==
- Constituted as the Detroit Sector, Ferrying Command on 14 February 1942

Activated on 18 February 1942
Redesignated Detroit Sector, Domestic Wing, Ferrying Command on 25 April 1942
Redesignated 3rd Ferrying Group, Domestic Wing, Ferrying Command on 26 May 1942
Redesignated 3rd Ferrying Group on 20 May 1943
Disbanded on 31 March 1944

- Reconstituted and redesignated 533rd Tactical Airlift Group on 31 July 1985

=== Assignments ===
- Domestic Wing, Air Corps Ferrying Command (later Ferrying Division, Air Transport Command), 18 February 1942 – 31 March 1944

=== Components ===
- 5th Air Corps Ferry Squadron (later 5th Ferrying Squadron), 1 April 1942 – 31 March 1944
- 19th Air Corps Ferry Squadron (later 19th Ferrying Squadron), 4 June 1942 – 31 March 1944
- 60th Air Corps Ferry Squadron (later 60th Ferrying Squadron), 20 January 1943 – 31 March 1944
- 74th Air Corps Ferry Squadron (later 74th Ferrying Squadron), 1 February 1943 – 31 March 1944
- 306th Ferrying Squadron, 25 June 1943 – 31 March 1944
- 308th Materiel Squadron (later 308th Service Squadron), c. 18 February 1942 – c. 20 July 1943
- 345th Air Base Squadron (later 345th Base Headquarters & Air Base Squadron): 4 June 1942 – 31 March 1944
- 316th Sub Depot: c. 1 January – 31 March 44
- 885th Military Police Company, Aviation (later 885th Guard Squadron): 13 May 1942 – c. 31 March 1944
- 445th AAF Band (later 745th Army Band, 745th AF Band): 20 Apr 43 – 31 March 44

=== Stations ===
- Wayne County Airport (later Romulus Army Air Base), Michigan, 18 February 1942 – 31 March 1944

=== Campaign ===
Campaign Streamer	Campaign	Dates	Notes
	American Theater without inscription	18 February 1942 – 31 March 1944	Northwest Sector, air Corps Ferrying Command (later 7th Ferrying Group)
