= Twenty-Second Air Force =

United States Air Force numbered unit

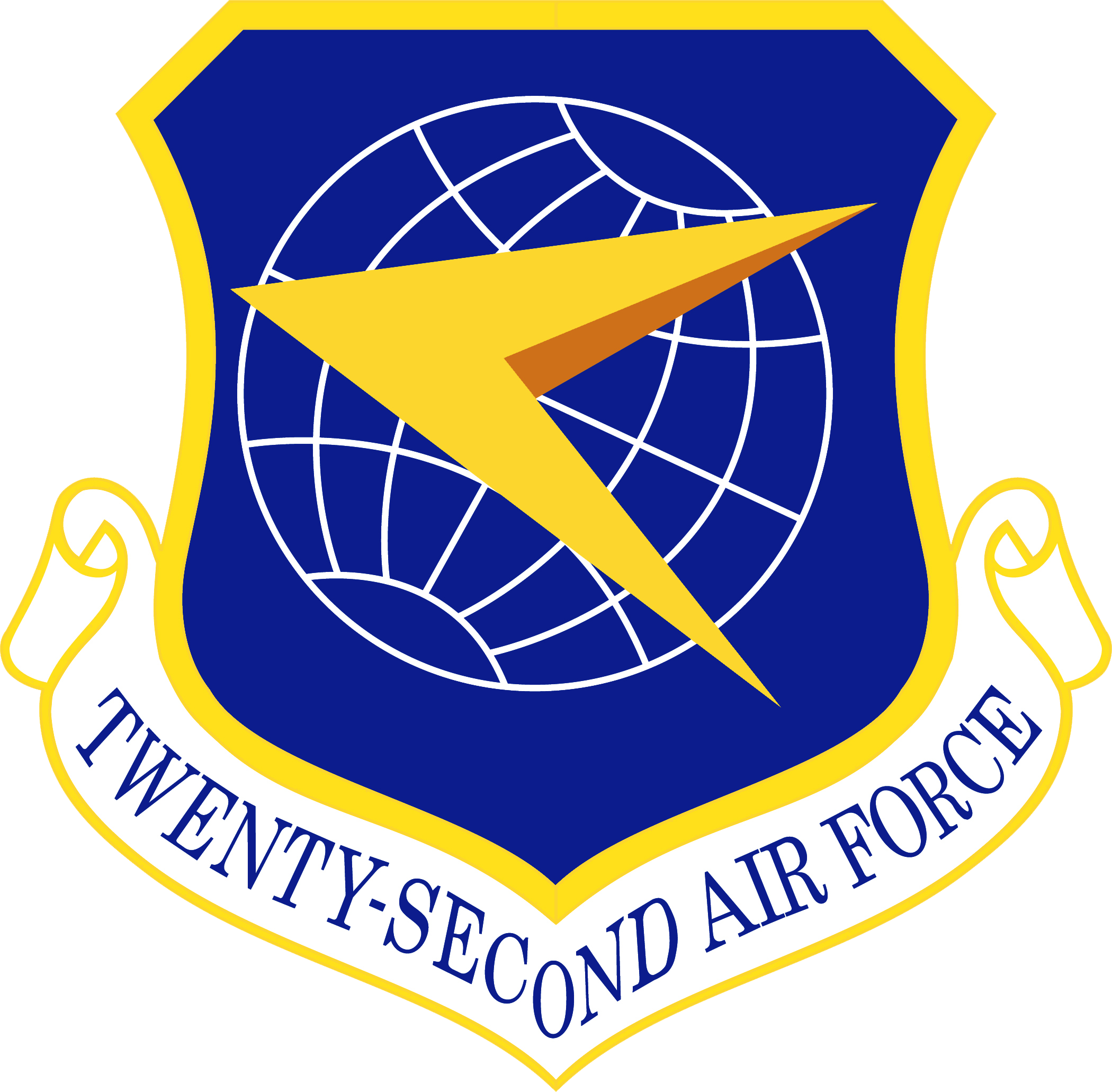
- Shield of the Twenty-Second Air Force
- Active: 18 February 1942 – 31 October 1946; 1 July 1948 – present (84 years, 4 months)
- Country: United States
- Branch: United States Air Force
- Type: Numbered Air Force
- Role: Provide combat-ready reserve air forces
- Part of: Air Force Reserve Command
- Headquarters: Dobbins Air Reserve Base, Georgia, U.S.
- Engagements: World War II - American Theater

- Decorations: Air Force Outstanding Unit Award

Commanders
- Current commander: Maj Gen Frank L. Bradfield III

Twenty-Second Air Force (22 AF) is a Numbered Air Force component of Air Force Reserve Command (AFRC). It was activated on 1 July 1993 and is headquartered at Dobbins Air Reserve Base, Georgia.

In the event of mobilization, some of the Twenty-Second Air Force's subordinate units would come under the operational control (OPCON) of the Air Mobility Command's (AMC) 21st Expeditionary Mobility Task Force, headquartered at McGuire Air Force Base, New Jersey, while others would come under OPCON of Air Education and Training Command's 19th Air Force at Randolph AFB, Texas.

== Mission ==
22 AF is responsible for recruiting and training reservists and for maintaining subordinate units at the highest level of combat readiness. A by-product of training is to coordinate daily support of the active duty air force.

22 AF's wartime mission is to provide combat-ready airlift and support units and augments personnel requirements to Air Mobility Command in the United States.

Twenty-Second Air Force manages more than 25,000 Reservists and has 149 unit-equipped aircraft. Reserve crews in 22 AF fly the C-130 Hercules, including the WC-130 "Hurricane Hunter" aircraft, which are located at nine different Air Force Reserve wings. The wings, flying squadrons and support units are spread throughout nine states – from New York to Mississippi, Ohio and Minnesota, with its westernmost wing in Colorado Springs, Colorado.

== Units ==
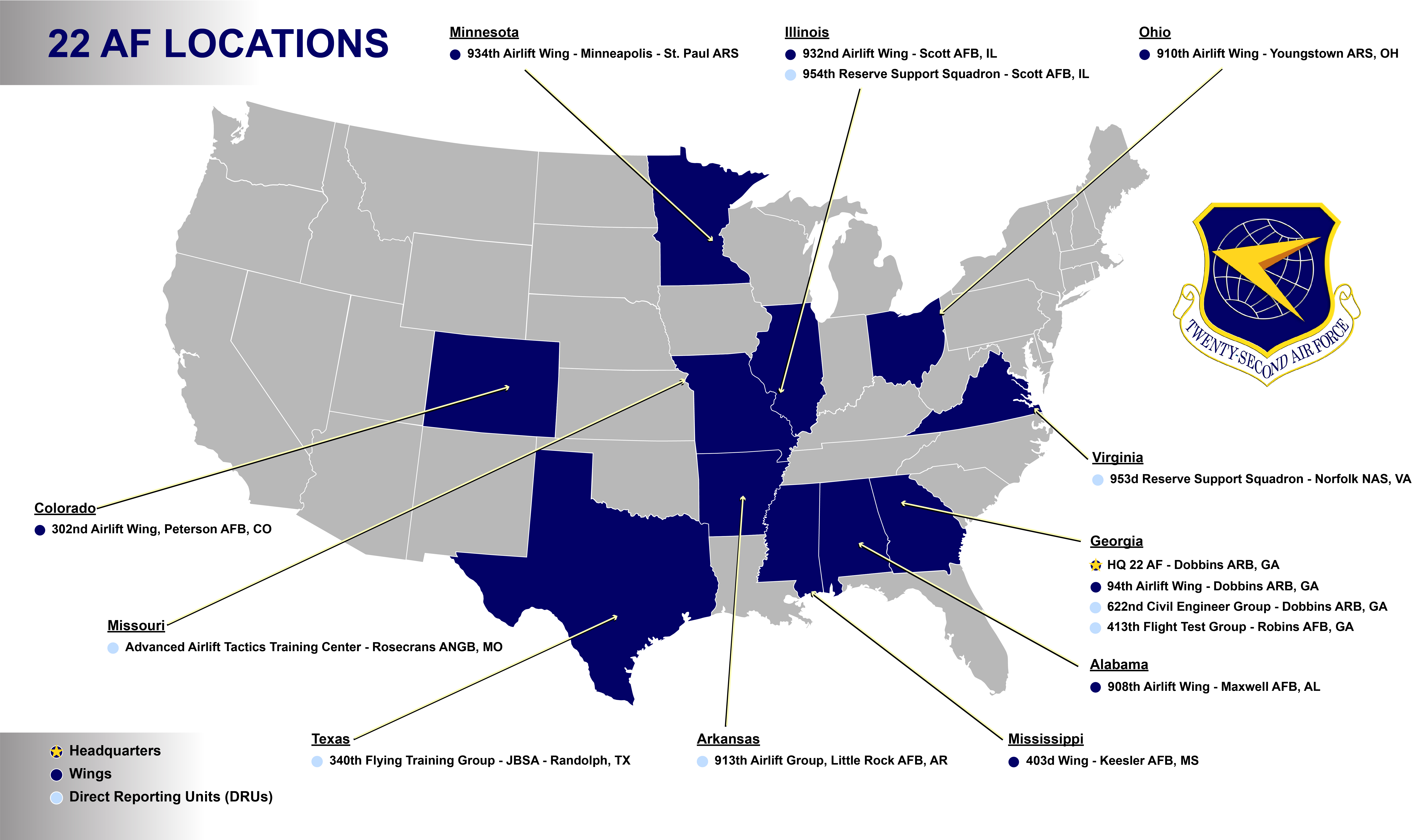
Locations of units assigned to the Twenty-Second Air Force, 2019

- 94th Airlift Wing (Dobbins ARB, Georgia)
- 302nd Airlift Wing (Peterson AFB, Colorado)
- 340th Flying Training Group (Joint Base San Antonio, Texas)
- 403rd Wing (Keesler AFB, Mississippi)
- 413th Flight Test Group (Robins AFB, Georgia)
- 908th Airlift Wing (Maxwell AFB, Alabama)
- 910th Airlift Wing (Youngstown-Warren Air Reserve Station, Ohio)
- 913th Airlift Group (Little Rock AFB, Arkansas)
- 932nd Airlift Wing (Scott AFB, Illinois)
- 934th Airlift Wing (Minneapolis St Paul ARS, Minnesota)

== History ==
Established as the Domestic Division, Air Corps Ferrying Command in the early days of World War II, the organization's mission was the transport of newly produced aircraft from points within the United States to Ports of Embarkation for shipment to Britain and other overseas Allies. In 1946, the organization was transferred to Air Transport Command and became, in essence, a military airline its Continental Division, managing transport routes within the United States.

When the USAF was created as a separate service in 1947, Military Air Transport Service was established to support the new Department of Defense, with responsibility for its support falling to the Department of the Air Force. Redesignated Western Transport Air Force (WESTAF), the organization managed all MATS operations from the Mississippi River west to the east coast of Africa until MATS was replaced by the Military Airlift Command in 1966. When MATS became MAC, WESTAF was redesignated 22d AF, with headquarters at Travis AFB, CA.

During the 1960s, Twenty-Second Air Force transports flew missions worldwide, supporting the efforts of the United States in Southeast Asia, Europe and other places around the world. In December 1974, the Twenty-Second Air Force absorbed Tactical Air Command's Twelfth Air Force C-130 Hercules tactical airlift operations.

On 29 March 1979, the Twenty-Second Air Force assumed responsibility for managing Military Airlift Command resources in the Pacific. For this mission, the unit provided a single commander for MAC airlift units in the Pacific theater; command and control of theater-assigned airlift forces for Pacific Air Forces; theater tactical airlift war planning and Pacific exercise planning; and aerial ports in the Pacific area to support the air movement of personnel, cargo, equipment, patients, and mail. The division participated in tactical exercises such as Team Spirit, Ulchi Focus Lens, and Capstan Dragon.

The unit was relieved from assignment to Military Airlift Command and assigned to Air Mobility Command on 1 June 1992. Activated the same day at Dobbins ARB, GA, with a change in assignment to the Air Force Reserve. It is under the peacetime command of Headquarters Air Force Reserve Command at Robins Air Force Base, GA.

== Lineage ==
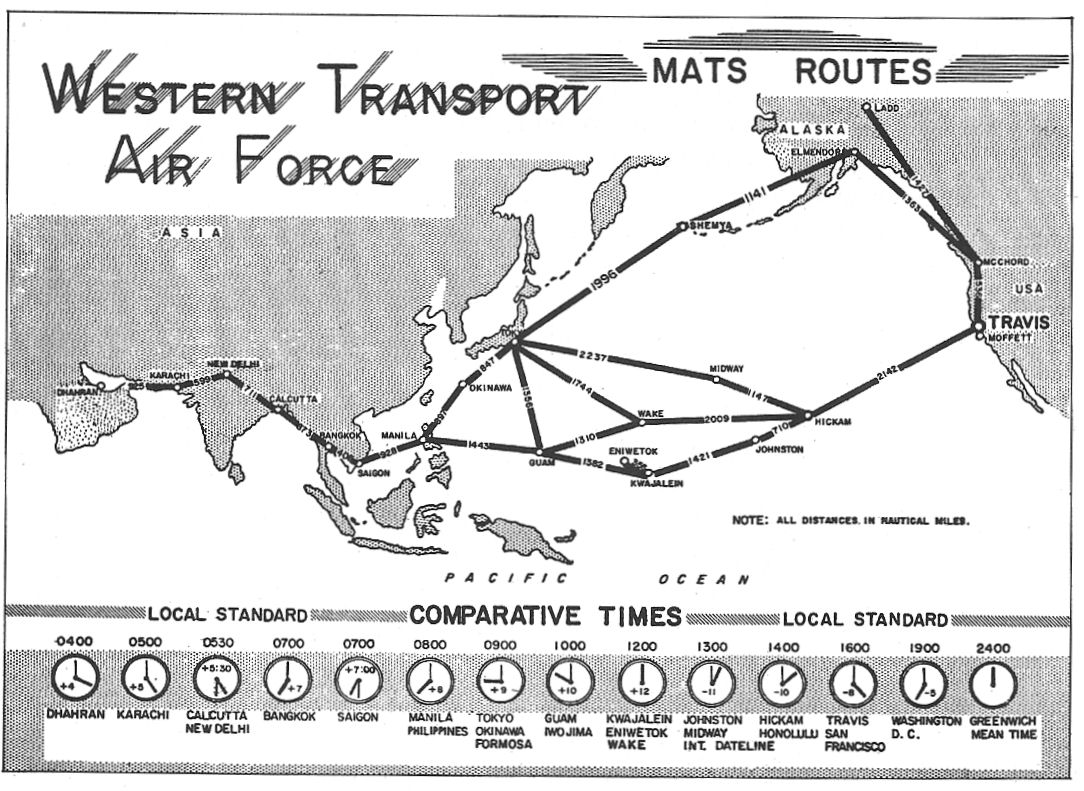
Route map of the Western Transport Air Force, 1964

Continental Division, Air Transport Command

- Established as the Domestic Wing, Air Corps Ferrying Command and activated on 18 February 1942

Redesignated Domestic Wing, Army Air Forces Ferry Command on 9 March 1942
Redesignated Domestic Wing, Army Air Forces Ferrying Command on 31 March 1942
Redesignated Ferrying Division, Air Transport Command on 20 June 1942
Redesignated Continental Division, Air Transport Command on 1 March 1946
Discontinued on 31 October 1946
Consolidated on 29 March 1979 with Twenty-Second Air Force as Twenty-Second Air Force

Twenty-Second Air Force

- Designated and organized as Continental Division, Military Air Transport Service on 1 July 1948

Redesignated Western Transport Air Force on 1 July 1958
Redesignated Twenty-Second Air Force on 8 January 1966
Consolidated on 29 March 1979 with Continental Division, Air Transport Command
Inactivated on 1 July 1993
Activated on 1 July 1993

=== Assignments ===
- Air Corps Ferrying Command (later Army Air Forces Ferry Command, Army Air Forces Ferrying Command, Air Transport Command, 18 February 1942 – 31 October 1946
- Military Air Transport Service (later Military Airlift Command), 1 July 1948
- Air Mobility Command, 1 June 1992 – 1 July 1993
- Air Force Reserve (later Air Force Reserve Command), 1 July 1993 – present

=== Components ===
==== Continental Division, Air Transport Command ====
Sectors

- California Sector, Air Corps Ferrying Command (later 6th Ferrying Group), 18 February 1942 – 31 March 1944

Long Beach Municipal Airport, California
Replaced by 556th AAF Base Unit (6th Ferrying Group), 31 March 1944 – 1 December 1946

- Detroit Sector, Air Corps Ferrying Command (later 3d Ferrying Group), 18 February 1942 – 31 March 1944

Wayne County Airport, Michigan
Replaced by 553d AAF Base Unit (3d Ferrying Group), 31 March 1944 – 15 January 1946

- Midwest Sector, Air Corps Ferrying Command (later 5th Ferrying Group), 18 February 1942 – 31 March 1944

Hensley Field, Texas
Replaced by 555th AAF Base Unit(5th Ferrying Group), 31 March 1944 – 9 August 1946

- Nashville Sector, Air Corps Ferrying Command (later 4th Ferrying Group), 18 February 1942 – 31 March 1944

Nashville Municipal Airport, Tennessee
Replaced by 554th AAF Base Unit (4th Ferrying Group), 31 March 1944-c. December 1945

- Northeast Sector, Air Corps Ferrying Command (later 2d Ferrying Group), 18 February 1942 – 31 March 1944

Logan Field, New Castle Army Air Field, Delaware
Replaced by 552d AAF Base Unit (2d Ferrying Group), 31 March 1944 – 31 December 1945

- Northwest Sector, Air Corps Ferrying Command (later 7th Ferrying Group), 18 February 1942 – 31 March 1944

Boeing Field, Washington, Gore Field, Montana
Replaced by 557th AAF Base Unit (7th Ferrying Group), 31 March 1944 – 14 December 1945 (Note: In an apparent typographical error, Kane gives the assignment date for these sectors as beginning on 28 February. But see Administrative History, pp. 64-66.)

- Central Sector, Air Transport Command, 25–31 March 1944
- Western Sector, Air Transport Command, 25–31 March 1944
- Eastern Sector, Air Transport Command, 25–31 March 1944

Wings

- 23d AAF Ferrying Wing (later North Atlantic Wing, Air Transport Command), Ferrying Command, 20 Jun 1942 – 1 Sep 1943

Presque Isle Army Air Field, Maine

- 24th AAF Ferrying Wing (later South Atlantic Wing, Air Transport Command), 27 Jun 1942 – 9 October 1943

Atkinson Field, Georgetown, British Guiana

- 25th AAF Ferrying Wing (later South Pacific Wing, Air Transport Command), 27 Jun 1942 – 30 September 1943

Hamilton Field, California

- 26th AAF Ferrying Wing (later Africa Middle East Wing, Air Transport Command), 27 Jun 1942 – 30 Sep 1943

Payne Airfield, Cairo, Egypt

- 27th AAF Ferrying Wing (later Caribbean Wing, Air Transport Command), 19 Jun 1942 – 16 Oct 1943
- Foreign Wing, Ferrying Command, 28 Feb – 19 Jun 1942
- Domestic Transportation Wing, Air Transport Command, 27 Nov 1944 – 15 Jan 1945
- Central Ferrying Wing, Air Transport Command, 22 Oct 1944 – 10 Mar 1945
- Western Ferrying Wing, Air Transport Command, 22 Oct 1944 – 10 Mar 1945
- Eastern Ferrying Wing, Air Transport Command, 22 Oct 1944 – 10 Mar 1945

Groups

- 2d Ferrying Group (see Northeast Sector, Air Corps Ferrying Command)
- 3d Ferrying Group (see Detroit Sector, Air Corps Ferrying Command)
- 4th Ferrying Group (see Nashville Sector, Air Corps Ferrying Command)
- 5th Ferrying Group (see Midwest Sector, Air Corps Ferrying Command)
- 6th Ferrying Group (see California Sector, Air Corps Ferrying Command)
- 7th Ferrying Group (see Northwest Sector, Air Corps Ferrying Command)
- 20th Ferrying Group, 3 Feb 1943 – 31 March 1944

Nashville Municipal Airport, Tennessee
Replaced by 558 AAF Base Unit (20th Ferrying Group), 31 Mar 1944 – 9 Apr 1946

- 21st Ferrying Group, 17 Nov 1943 – 31 March 1944

Palm Springs Army Airfield, California
Replaced by 560 AAF Base Unit (21st Ferrying Group), 31 Mar 1944 – 20 May 1946

- 33d Ferrying Group, 4 Mar 1943 – 31 Mar 1944

Fairfax Field, Kansas
Replaced by 569 AAF Base Unit (33d Ferrying Group), 31 Mar 1944 – 15 Apr 1945

==== Twenty-Second Air Force ====
Divisions

- 323d Air Division, 1 Jul 1958 – 8 May 1960
- 834th Air (later Airlift) Division, 1 – 31 Dec 1974, 1 Oct 1978 – 1 Apr 1992

Wings

- 60th Military Airlift (later, 60 Airlift) Wing, 8 Jan 1966 – 15 Feb 1979; 21 Jul 1980 – 1 Jul 1993
- 61st Military Airlift (later, 61 Military Airlift Support) Wing, 8 Jan 1966 – 1 Oct 1978
- 62d Troop Carrier, Heavy (later 62 Air Transport Wing, Heavy; 62 Military Airlift Wing; 62 Airlift Wing) Wing, 1 Jul 1957 – 1 Jul 1993
- 63d Troop Carrier, Heavy (later 63 Military Airlift Wing, 63 Airlift Wing) Wing, 1 Jul 1957 – 1 Jul 1993
- 94th Airlift Wing, 1 Jul 1993 – 1 Oct 1994; 1 Apr 1997 – present
- 97th Air Mobility Wing, 1 Oct 1992 – 1 Jul 1993
- 302d Airlift Wing, 1 Apr 1997 – present
- 314th Tactical Airlift (later 314 Airlift) Wing, 31 Dec 1974 – 1 Jul 1993
- 315th Airlift Wing (Associate) (later 315 Airlift Wing), 1 Jul 1993 – 2011
- 375th Military Airlift (later 375 Airlift) Wing, 1 Feb 1990 – 1 Jul 1993
- 403d Airlift Wing (later 403 Wing), 1 Jul 1993 – 1 Oct 1994; 1 Apr 1997 – present
- 434th Air Refueling Wing, 1 Oct 1993 – 1 Apr 1997
- 439th Airlift Wing, 1 Jul 1993 – 2011
- 440th Airlift Wing, 1 Apr 1997 – 18 Sep 2016
- 443d Military Airlift Wing, Training (later 443 Airlift Wing), 1 Apr 1973 – 1 Oct 1992
- 445th Airlift Wing, 1 Oct 1994 – 1 Apr 1997
- 459th Airlift Wing, 1 Jul 1993 – 1 Apr 2003
- 463d Tactical Airlift (later 463 Airlift) Wing, 31 Dec 1974 – 1 Jul 1993
- 512th Airlift Wing (Associate) (later 512 Airlift Wing), 1 Jul 1993 – 2011
- 514th Airlift Wing (Associate) (later 514 Air Mobility Wing), 1 Jul 1993 – 2011
- 908th Airlift Wing, 1 Apr 1997 – present
- 910th Airlift Wing, 1 Apr 1997 – present
- 911th Airlift Wing, 1 Apr 1997 – present
- 913th Airlift Wing, 1 Apr 1997 – 1 Oct 2007
- 914th Airlift Wing, 1 Apr 1997 – present
- 916th Air Refueling Wing, 1 Oct 1994 – 1 Apr 1997
- 927th Air Refueling Wing, 1 Oct 1994 – 1 Apr 1997
- 934th Airlift Wing, 1 Apr 1997 – present
- 1550th Combat Crew Training (later 542 Crew Training) Wing, 21 May 1990 – 1 Jul 1993
- 1501st Air Transport Wing (later 1501 Air Transport Wing, Heavy), 25 Jun – 1 Jul 1958; 8 May 1960 – 8 Jan 1966.
- 1502d Air Transport Wing, Heavy, 24 Jun 1958 – 8 Jan 1966
- 1503d Air Transport Wing, Heavy, 24 Jun 1958 – 22 Jan 1966
- 1608th Air Transport Wing, Medium, 1 Jul 1957 – 1 May 1958
- 1701st Air Transport Wing, 1 Oct 1948 – 1 May 1953
- 1705th Air Transport Wing (later 1705 Air Transport Group), 24 Aug 1950 – 1 Oct 1951
- 1707th Air Transport Wing (Training) (later, 1707 Air Transport Wing, Heavy [Training]), 1 May 1954 – 1 Nov 1958
- Navy Air Transport Wing (later Navy Air Transport Wing, Pacific), 1 Jul 1957 – 30 Jun 1967

Groups

- 1501st Air Transport Group (later 1704 Air Transport Group), 1 Jan 1950 – 1 Jul 1952
- 1601st Air Transport Group (later 1703 Air Transport Group, 1703 Air Transport Group, Heavy), 20 Oct 1949 – 18 Jun 1957
- 1700th Air Transport Group (later 1700 Air Transport Group, Medium), 1 Oct 1948 – 18 Dec 1957
- 1701st Air Transport Group, 1 May–Jun 1953
- 1702d Air Transport Group, 1 Oct 1948 – 17 Jul 1950
- 1705th Air Transport Group (later Air Transport Group, Heavy), 24 Jan 1953 – 1 Jul 1957, 24 Jun 1958 – 18 Jun 1960.
- 1st Aeromedical Transport Group Light, 8 Nov 1956 – 6 Jun 1964
- 1706th Air Transport Group (Air Evac) (later 1706 Air Transport Group, Medium [Air Evac]; 1706 Air Transport Group, Light [Air Evac]), 1 Feb 1953 – 8 Nov 1956.
- 1708th Ferrying Group (later 1708 Wing), 16 Jul 1951 – 1 Mar 1958.
- 413th Flight Test Group, 1 Oct 2003 – present
- 622d Flight Test Group, 24 Sep 2001 – 1 Oct 2003
- 616th Military Airlift Group, 1 Nov 1975 – 9 Aug 1990, 1 Apr 1992 – 1 Jun 1992

Squadrons

- 16th Air Transport (later 1254 Air Transport) Squadron, 1 Sep 1948 – 12 Mar 1951
- 1726th Air Transport Squadron (Special), 1 Oct 1948 – 23 Apr 1949
- 1737th Ferrying Squadron, 24 Sep 1950 – 16 Jul 1951
- Air Transport Squadron (VR-3), USN, 1 Oct 1948-c. Dec 1948, 1 Dec 1949 – 1 Jul 1957.

=== Stations ===
- Bolling Airfield, Washington D.C., 28 December 1941
- Lunken Airport, Cincinnati, Ohio, 1 February 1943
- Kelly Air Force Base, Texas, 1 July 1948
- Travis Air Force Base, California, 25 June 1958
- Dobbins ARB, Georgia, 1 July 1993

== List of commanders ==
No.	Commander		Term		
No.	Portrait	Name	Took office	Left office	Term length
-	Robert A. McIntosh	Major General; Robert A. McIntosh	1 July 1993	1 November 1994	1 year, 123 days
-	James E. Sherrard III	Major General; James E. Sherrard III	1 November 1994	17 January 1995	77 days
-	Joseph McNeil	Brigadier General; Joseph McNeil	17 January 1995	6 August 1995	201 days
-	Michael R. Lee	Brigadier General; Michael R. Lee	6 August 1995	11 January 1998	2 years, 158 days
-	James E. Sherrard III	Major General; James E. Sherrard III	11 January 1998	25 September 1998	257 days
-	John J. Batbie Jr.	Major General; John J. Batbie Jr.	25 September 1998	7 May 2000	1 year, 225 days
-	James D. Bankers	Major General; James D. Bankers	7 May 2000	11 March 2006	5 years, 308 days
-	Martin M. Mazick	Major General; Martin M. Mazick	11 March 2006	4 April 2009	3 years, 24 days
-	James T. Rubeor	Major General; James T. Rubeor	4 April 2009	16 September 2011	2 years, 165 days
-	Wallace W. Farris Jr.	Major General; Wallace W. Farris Jr.	16 September 2011	October 2013	~2 years, 15 days
-	Mark A. Kyle	Major General; Mark A. Kyle	October 2013	July 2014	~273 days
-	Stayce Harris	Major General; Stayce Harris	July 2014	November 2017	~2 years, 38 days
-	John P. Stokes	Major General; John P. Stokes	8 August 2016	November 2017	~1 year, 85 days
-	Craig L. La Fave	Major General; Craig L. La Fave	November 2017	10 July 2021	~1 year, 267 days
-	John P. Healy	Major General; John P. Healy	26 July 2019	10 July 2021	1 year, 349 days
-	Bret C. Larson	Major General; Bret C. Larson	10 July 2021	2 April 2023	1 year, 266 days
-	Melissa A. Coburn	Major General; Melissa A. Coburn	2 April 2023	6 June 2025	2 years, 66 days
-	Frank L. Bradfield III	Major General; Frank L. Bradfield III	7 June 2025	Incumbent	1 year, 30 days
