= 19th Air Refueling Squadron =

Inactive US Air Force unit

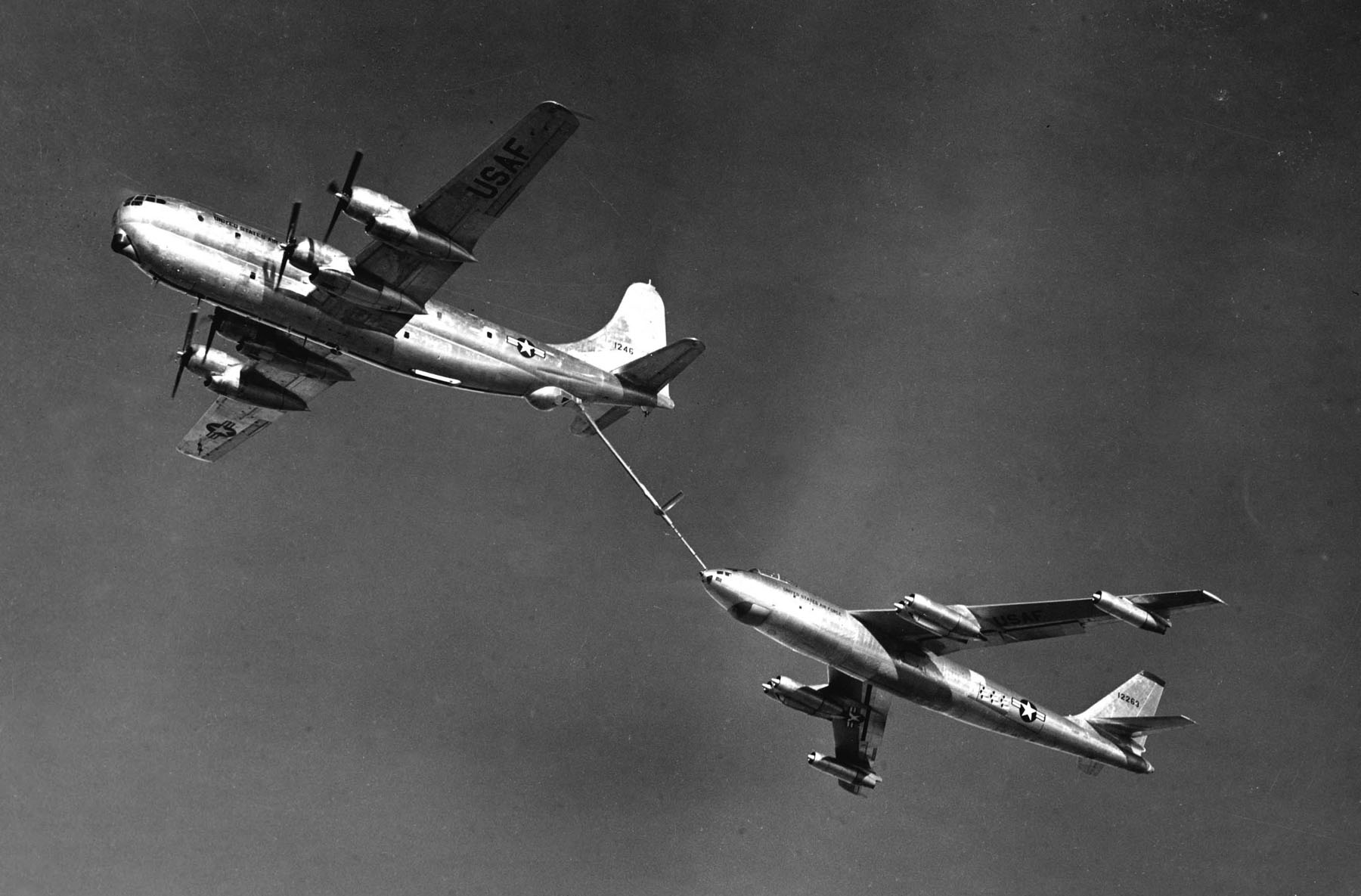
- KC 97 refueling a Boeing B-47 Stratojet (Note: Aircraft is Boeing KC-97F-50-BO Stratofreighter, serial 51-246 (retired to MASDC on 6 April 1964) refueling Boeing B-47B-45-BW Stratojet, serial 51-2263.)>
- Active: 1942–1944; 1956–1966
- Country: United States
- Branch: United States Air Force
- Role: Aerial refueling
- Mottos: Servire de Supernis (Latin for 'Service Over and Above')
- Engagements: World War II

Insignia
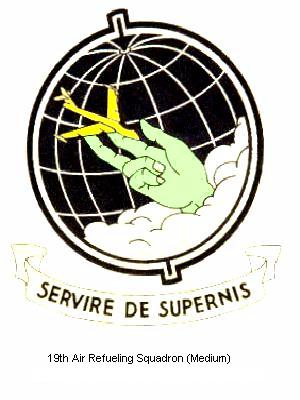
- 19th Air Refueling Squadron emblem

The 19th Air Refueling Squadron is an inactive unit of the United States Air Force. At the time of its inactivation, it was based at Otis Air Force Base.

On 19 Sep 1985 the 19th Air Refueling Squadron, Medium was consolidated with the 19th Ferrying Squadron, a unit that was last active 31 Mar 1944. This action was directed by Department of the Air Force Letter DAF/MPM 662q Attachment 2 (Inactive Units), 19 Sep 1985. The Consolidated Unit will retain the Designation of 19th Air Refueling Squadron, Heavy".

== History ==
=== Operations ===
- World War II

== Lineage ==
19th Ferrying Squadron

- Constituted as the 19th Air Corps Ferry Squadron on 18 February 1942

Activated on 4 June 1942
Redesignated 19th Ferrying Squadron c. 12 May 1943
Disbanded on 31 March 1944

- Consolidated with the 19th Air Refueling Squadron on 19 September 1985 as the 19th Air Refueling Squadron, Heavy

19th Air Refueling Squadron

- Constituted as the 19th Air Refueling Squadron, Medium in 1956

Activated on 1 February 1956
Inactivated on 25 June 1966

- Consolidated with the 19th Ferrying Squadron on 19 September 1985 as the 19th Air Refueling Squadron, Heavy

=== Assignments ===
- 3rd Ferrying Group, 4 June 1942 – 31 March 1944
- 19th Bombardment Wing, 1 February 1956 (attached to 379th Bombardment Wing until 30 June 1956)
- 4050th Air Refueling Wing, 1 April 1960
- 4038th Strategic Wing, April 1961
- 397th Bombardment Wing, 1 February 1963
- 499th Air Refueling Wing, 15 June 1963
- 817th Air Division, 1 July 1964 – 25 June 1966

=== Stations ===
- Romulus Army Air Base, Michigan, 4 June 1942 – 31 March 1944
- Homestead Air Force Base, Florida, 1 February 1956 (deployed to Ben Guerir Air Base, Morocco 1957; Lajes Air Base, Azores Islands, Portugal 1958)
- Otis Air Force Base, Massachusetts, 1 April 1960 – 25 June 1966 (deployed to RAF Brize Norton, England, 1963; RAF Fairford, England, 1963; Sondrestrom Air Base, Greenland, 1962–1963)

=== Aircraft ===
- Boeing KC-97 Stratofreighter (1956–1966)
