= 11th Airlift Squadron =

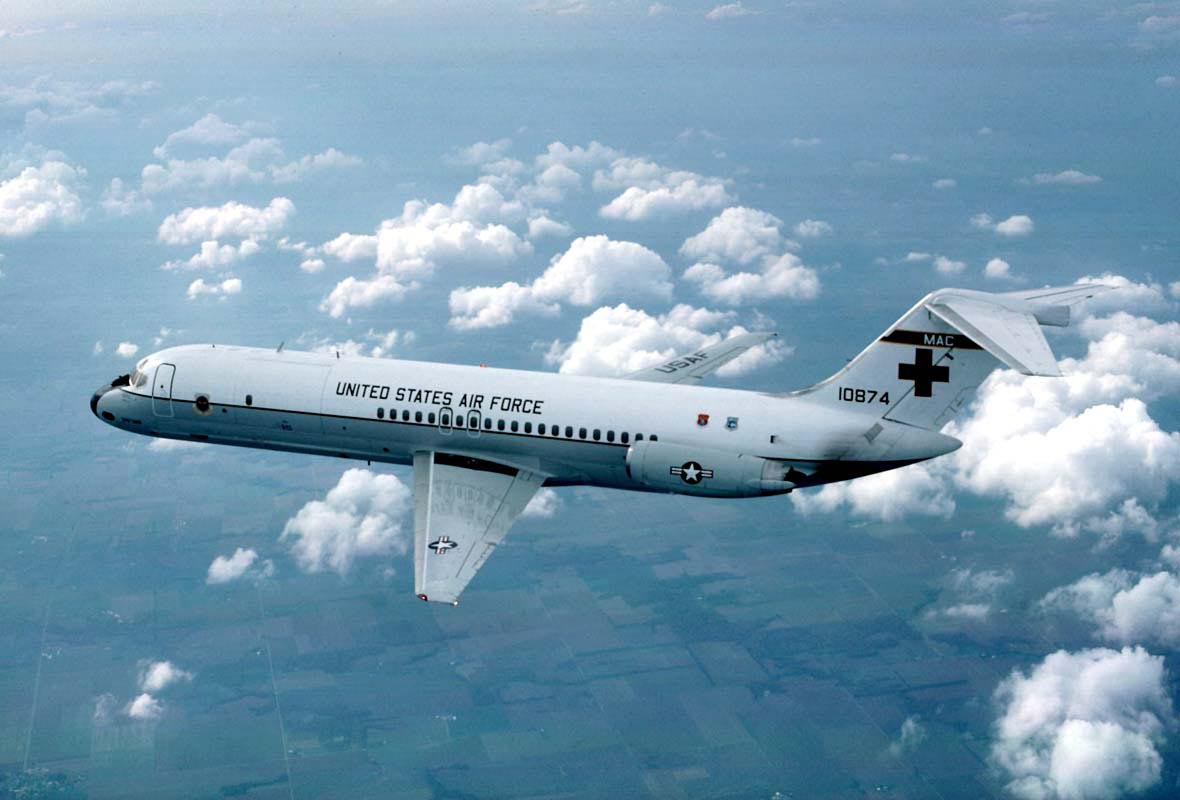
- HC-9 Nightingale flown by the squadron
- Active: 1942–1944; 1956–2003
- Country: United States
- Branch: United States Air Force
- Role: Airlift
- Part of: Air Mobility Command
- Garrison/HQ: Scott AFB
- Motto(s): Aeromedical Evacuation
- Decorations: Air Force Outstanding Unit Award

Insignia
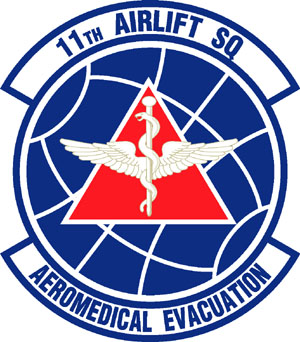
- 11th Airlift Squadron emblem (approved 8 May 1959)

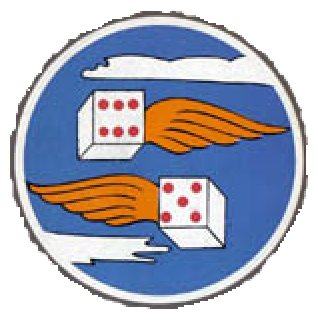
- 11th Ferrying Squadron emblem (approved 7 October 1943)

The 11th Airlift Squadron is an inactive United States Air Force unit. It was most recently part of the 375th Airlift Wing as Scott Air Force Base, Illinois. It operated McDonnell Douglas C-9 Nightingale aircraft conducting medical evacuation missions.

== History ==
=== World War II ===
The first predecessor of the squadron was organized in April 1942 at Hensley Field, Texas as the 11th Air Corps Ferrying Squadron and assigned to the Middle West Sector of Air Corps Ferrying Command's Domestic Wing. Hensley, located in Grand Prairie, Texas was the location of a Chance Vought Aircraft factory, and a short distance from Fort Worth Army Air Field, where Consolidated Aircraft had a plant. The 11th ferried aircraft from the factories to modification centers and operational units mostly within the Continental United States from, April 1942-March 1944.

=== Aeromedical airlift ===
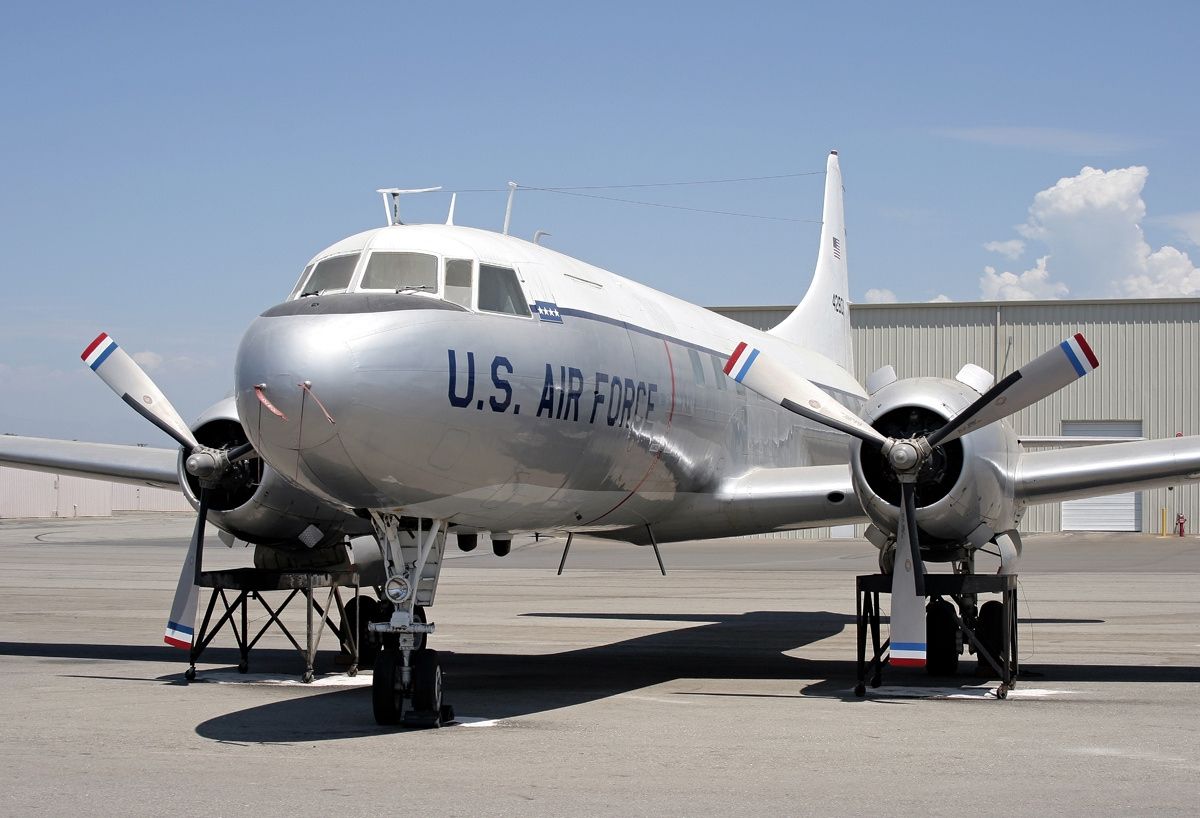
Convair C-131D

In 1956, Military Air Transport Service replaced its table of distribution (4-digit) aeromedical evacuation units with permanent units. As part of this action, the 1731st Air Transport Squadron (Aeromedical Evacuation), which had been organized at Scott Air Force Base, Illinois on 1 June 1952, was discontinued and its personnel and Convair C-131 Samaritans were transferred to the newly-activated 11th Aeromedical Transport Squadron.

The squadron missions included transport of wounded Afghan soldiers and civilians from 1986 to 1987."

== Lineage ==
11th Ferrying Squadron

- Constituted as the 11th Air Corps Ferrying Squadron on 18 February 1942

Activated on 16 April 1942
Redesignated 11th Ferrying Squadron on 12 May 1943
Disbanded on 1 April 1944.
Reconstituted and consolidated with the 11th Aeromedical Airlift Squadron as the 11th Aeromedical Airlift Squadron on 19 September 1985

11th Airlift Squadron

- Constituted as the 11th Aeromedical Transport Squadron, Light on 18 October 1956

Activated on 8 November 1956
Redesignated: 11th Aeromedical Transport Squadron on 25 July 1964
Redesignated 11th Aeromedical Airlift Squadron on 12 January 1966
Consolidated with the 11th Ferrying Squadron on 19 September 1985
Redesignated 11th Airlift Squadron on 1 October 1993
Inactivated on 30 September 2003

=== Assignments ===
- [Middle West Sector, Air Corps Ferrying Command (later] Middle West Sector, Domestic Wing, AAF Ferrying Command, 5th Ferrying Group]), 16 April 1942 – 1 April 1944
- 1st Aeromedical Transport Group, 8 November 1956
- 1405th Aeromedical Transport Wing, 8 June 1964
- 375th Aeromedical Airlift Wing (later 375th Military Airlift Wing), 12 January 1966
- 375th Operations Group, 1 December 1991 – 30 September 2003

=== Stations ===
- Hensley Field, Texas, 16 April 1942
- Love Field, Texas, 8 September 1942 – 1 April 1944
- Scott Air Force Base, Illinois, 8 Nov 1956 – 30 September 2003

=== Aircraft ===
- Convair C-131 Samaritan (1956–1970)
- Douglas C-118 Liftmaster (1956–1970)
- Douglas C-9 Nightingale (1968–2005)

== Bibliography ==
- Mueller, Robert (1989). Air Force Bases, Vol. I, Active Air Force Bases Within the United States of America on 17 September 1982 (PDF). Washington, DC: Office of Air Force History. ISBN 0-912799-53-6.
- Ravenstein, Charles A. (1984). Air Force Combat Wings, Lineage & Honors Histories 1947-1977. Washington, DC: Office of Air Force History. ISBN 0-912799-12-9.
