= James E. Sherrard III =

United States Air Force general

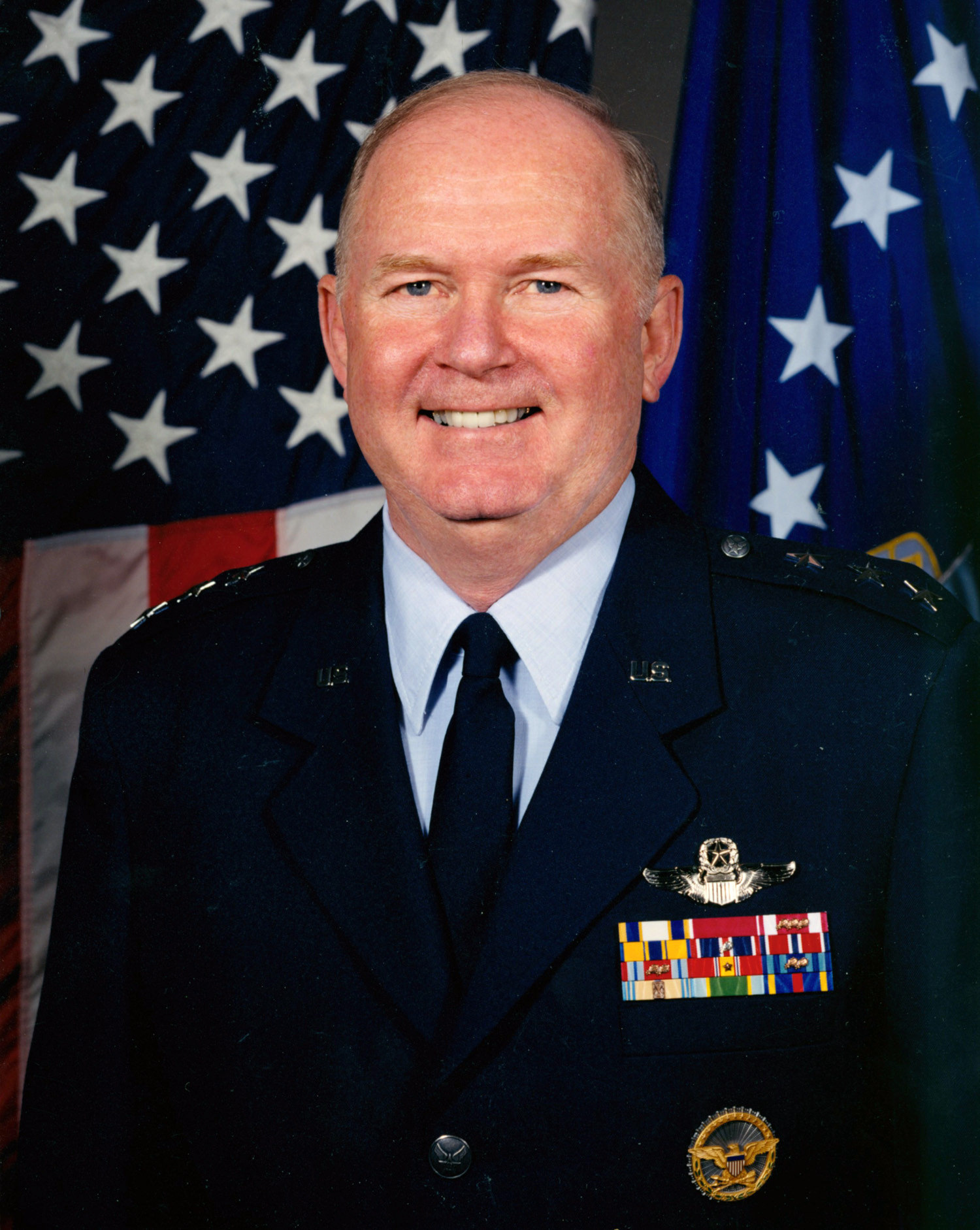
- Born: January 1, 1943 (age 83); Tutwiler, Mississippi
- Died: March 13, 2025; Pensacola, Fla
- Burial place: At a date to be determined Arlington National Cemetery.
- Military career
- Allegiance: United States
- Branch: United States Air Force
- Service years: 1965–2004
- Rank: Lieutenant general
- Commands: Air Force Reserve Command; Twenty-Second Air Force; Fourth Air Force; 433rd Military Airlift Wing; 440th Tactical Airlift Wing; 910th Tactical Airlift Group
- Awards: Air Force Distinguished Service Medal; Legion of Merit

James Edward Sherrard III (born January 1, 1943) is a retired lieutenant general in the United States Air Force who served as commander of the United States Air Force Reserve Command and commander, Headquarters Air Force Reserve, a separate operating agency located at Robins Air Force Base, Georgia. He served in this position from November 1994 to June 1998. He retired in 2004.

Sherrard was born in Tutwiler, Mississippi. He graduated from the University of Mississippi's Reserve Officer Training Corps program and entered active duty in July 1965. A command pilot with more than 5,000 flying hours, he commanded an Air Force Reserve group, two wings and two numbered air forces He also served as commander of the Twenty-Second Air Force at Dobbins Air Reserve Base, Georgia.

Sherrard's awards include the Air Force Distinguished Service Medal, Legion of Merit, Meritorious Service Medal with three oak leaf clusters, Air Force Commendation Medal, Air Force Outstanding Unit Award with silver and bronze oak leaf clusters, Air Force Organizational Excellence Award with two oak leaf clusters, and Order of the Sword.
