= 4th Ferrying Group =

4th Ferrying Group (later 541st Tactical Airlift Group)
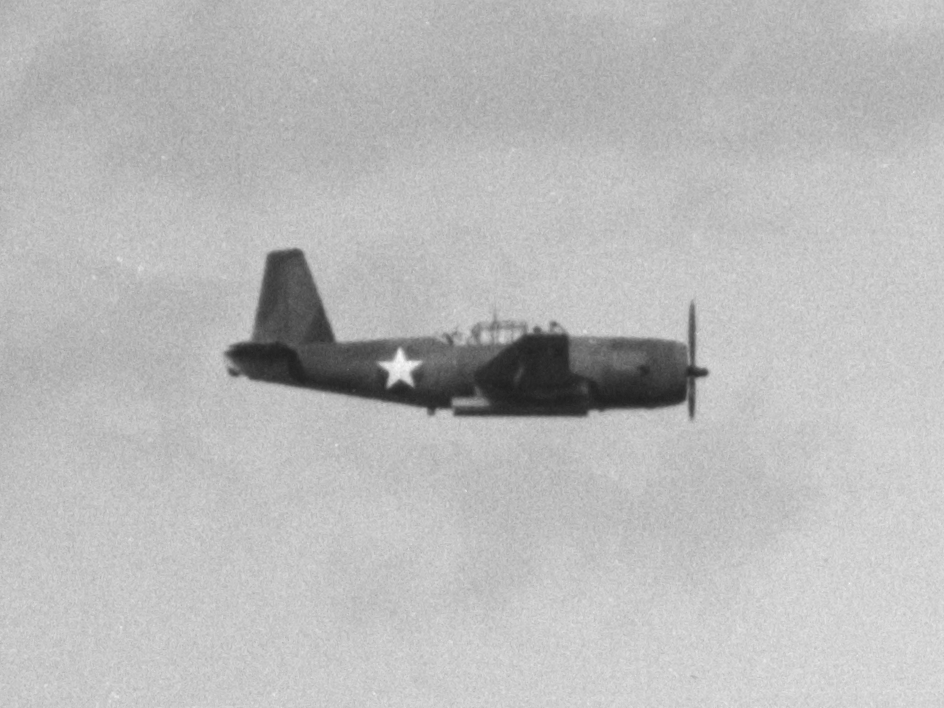
- A-31 Vengeance in flight near Nashville
- Active: 1942–1944
- Branch: United States Air Force
- Role: Aircraft ferrying

The 4th Ferrying Group was a World War II unit of the United States Army Air Forces (AAF). It was activated in February 1942 as the Nashville Sector, Ferrying Command, but soon changed its name. It ferried aircraft manufactured in the midwest and south until March 1944, when it was disbanded in a general reorganization of AAF units in the United States. It was replaced by the 554th Army Air Forces Base Unit, which continued its mission until spring 1947.

The group was reconstituted in 1985 as the 541st Tactical Airlift Group, but has not been active since.

== World War II ==
The group's origins can be traced to 3 January 1942, when Air Corps Ferrying Command, in the aftermath of the attack on Pearl Harbor divided its Domestic Division into six sectors. The Nashville Sector was established at Nashville Municipal Airport, Tennessee and was responsible for ferrying aircraft from Vultee Aircraft factory at Nashville and the Curtiss-Wright Corporation factory at St. Louis, Missouri. The bulk of this work consisted in flying new planes from the plants to modification centers in the US. On 18 February, this office was formally organized as a unit, the Nashville Sector, Ferrying Command and Ferrying Command's Domestic Division became the Domestic Wing, Air Corps Ferrying Command.

In March 1942, the group was assigned its first operational unit, the 8th Air Corps Ferry Squadron. At this time, Ferrying Command had requested the AAF to reorganize its sectors as groups, with assigned squadrons. Accordingly, the sector became the 4th Ferrying Group on 26 May 1942. The group expanded by adding the 26th Squadron in July and the 59th in October.

In December 1942, the group moved to Memphis Municipal Airport, which was centrally located for the primary manufacturing facilities it served. At Memphis it added the 92nd and 93rd Ferrying Squadrons in early June 1943 and the 305th later in the month.

By 1944, the AAF was finding that standard military units like the 4th Group, whose manning was based on relatively inflexible tables of organization were not well adapted to support missions. Accordingly, the AAF adopted a more functional system in which each base was organized into a separate numbered unit. As part of this reorganization the group was disbanded on 31 March 1944 along with its subordinate units and its resources were absorbed by the 554th Army Air Forces Base Unit (4th Ferrying Group) which was designated and organized on the same day. The base unit was redescribed as the 554th AAF Base Unit (Ferrying Group) then discontinued after the end of World War II in March 1947.

The 4th Ferrying Group was reconstituted and redesignated the 541st Tactical Airlift Group on 31 July 1985, but remained inactive.

== Lineage ==
- Constituted as the Nashville Sector, Ferrying Command on 14 February 1942

Activated on 18 February 1942
Redesignated Nashville Sector, Domestic Wing, Ferrying Command on 25 April 1942
Redesignated 4th Ferrying Group, Domestic Wing, Ferrying Command on 26 May 1942
Redesignated 4th Ferrying Group on 20 May 1943
Disbanded on 31 March 1944

- Reconstituted and redesignated 541st Tactical Airlift Group on 31 July 1985

=== Assignments ===
- Domestic Wing, Air Corps Ferrying Command (later Ferrying Division, Air Transport Command), 18 February 1942 – 31 March 1944

=== Components ===
- 8th Air Corps Ferry Squadron (later 8th Ferrying Squadron), 24 March 1942 – 31 March 1944
- 26th Air Corps Ferry Squadron (later 26th Ferrying Squadron), 6 July 1942 – 31 March 1944
- 59th Air Corps Ferry Squadron (later 59th Ferrying Squadron), 15 October 1942 – 31 March 1944
- 92nd Ferrying Squadron, 1 June 1943 – 31 March 1944
- 93rd Ferrying Squadron, 1 June 1943 – 31 March 1944
- 305th Ferrying Squadron, 25 June 1943 – 31 March 1944
- 346th Air Base Squadron (later 346th Base Headquarters & Air Base Squadron): 4 June 1942 – 31 March 1944
- 70th Sub Depot: c. 1 January – 31 March 44
- 892nd Guard Squadron: c. 1 July 1943 – c. 31 March 1944
- 582nd Army Band (later 582nd AAF Band): 1943 – 31 March 44

=== Stations ===
- Nashville Municipal Airport, Tennessee, 18 February 1942
- Memphis Municipal Airport, Tennessee, 9 December 1942 – 31 March 1944

=== Campaign ===
Campaign Streamer	Campaign	Dates	Notes
	American Theater without inscription	18 February 1942 – 31 March 1944	Northwest Sector, air Corps Ferrying Command (later 7th Ferrying Group)
