= 6th Ferrying Group =

6th Ferrying Group (later 546th Tactical Airlift Group)
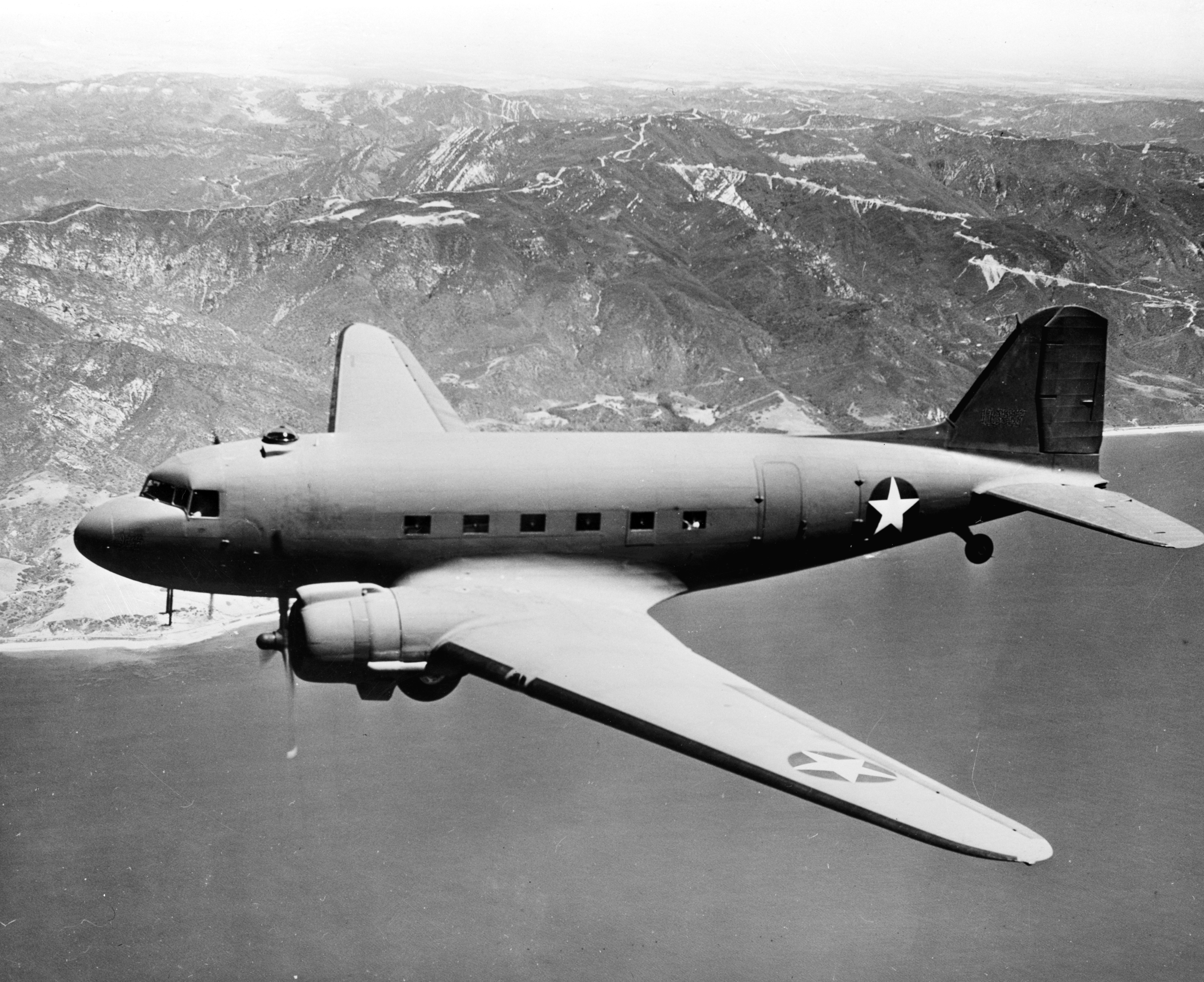
- C-47 Skytrain, manufactured at Long Beach
- Active: 1942-1944
- Country: USA
- Branch: United States Air Force
- Role: Aircraft ferrying

The 6th Ferrying Group was a World War II unit of the United States Army Air Forces (AAF). It was activated in February 1942 as the California Sector, Ferrying Command in February 1942, but soon changed its name. It ferried aircraft manufactured in California until March 1944, when it was disbanded in a general reorganization of AAF units in the United States. It was replaced by the 556th Army Air Forces Base Unit, which continued its mission until late in 1946.

The group was reconstituted in 1985 as the 546th Tactical Airlift Group, but has not been active since.

== History ==
=== World War II ===
The group's origins can be traced to 3 January 1942, when Air Corps Ferrying Command, in the aftermath of the attack on Pearl Harbor divided its Domestic Division into six sectors. The California Sector was established at Long Beach Municipal Airport, California and was responsible for ferrying aircraft from Consolidated Aircraft, Douglas Aircraft Company, Lockheed Aircraft Company, North American Aviation, Ryan Aeronautical Company, Northrop Corporation and Vega Aircraft Corporation factories in California. The sector's personnel was drawn from the Ferry Command's Western Division. The bulk of this work consisted in flying new planes from the plant to modification centers in the US. On 18 February, this office was formally organized as a unit, the California Sector, Ferrying Command and Ferrying Command's Domestic Division became the Domestic Wing, Air Corps Ferrying Command.

In April 1942, the group was assigned its first operational units, the 1st, 9th and 14th Air Corps Ferry Squadrons. Ferrying Command requested the AAF to reorganize its sectors as groups, with assigned squadrons. Accordingly, the sector became the 6th Ferrying Group on 26 May 1942. The group expanded with the addition of the 52nd Ferrying Squadron in late August. In September 1942, the 28th Ferrying Squadron moved from Hamilton Field, California and was assigned to the group. In January 1943, the 14th Squadron moved to Palm Springs Airport, California, where its personnel were used to form the cadre of the 21st Ferrying Group and it the returned to Long Beach on paper. On 15 February 1943, the first members of the Women's Auxiliary Ferrying Squadron (WAFS) arrived at Long each to augment the group. Nancy Love transferred to head the WAFS detachment, and, in March, became the first WAFS to ferry a large multiengine plane, flying a Douglas C-47 Skytrain to Memphis Municipal Airport in March.

By 1944, the Army Air Forces (AAF) was finding that standard military units like the 6th Group, whose manning was based on relatively inflexible tables of organization were not well adapted to support missions. Accordingly, the AAF adopted a more functional system in which each base was organized into a separate numbered unit. As part of this reorganization the group was disbanded on 31 March 1944 along with its subordinate units and its resources were absorbed by the 556th Army Air Forces Base Unit (6th Ferrying Group) which was designated and organized on the same day. The base unit was redescribed as the 556th AAF Base Unit (Ferrying Group) then discontinued after the end of World War II on 1 December 1946.

The 6th Ferrying Group was reconstituted and redesignated the 546th Tactical Airlift Group on 31 July 1985, but remained inactive.

== Lineage ==
- Constituted as the California Sector, Ferrying Command on 14 February 1942

Activated on 18 February 1942
Redesignated California Sector, Domestic Wing, Ferrying Command on 25 April 1942
Redesignated 6th Ferrying Group, Domestic Wing, Ferrying Command on 26 May 1942
Redesignated 6th Ferrying Group on 20 May 1943
Disbanded on 31 March 1944

- Reconstituted and redesignated 546th Tactical Airlift Group on 31 July 1985

=== Assignments ===
- Domestic Wing, Air Corps Ferrying Command (later Ferrying Division, Air Transport Command), 18 February 1942 – 31 March 1944

=== Components ===
- 1st Air Corps Ferry Sq (later 1st Ferrying Sq), 15 April 1942 – 31 March 1944
- 9th Air Corps Ferry Sq (later 9th Ferrying Sq), 15 April 1942 – 31 March 1944
- 14th Air Corps Ferry Sq, 15 April 1942 – 31 March 1944
- 28th Air Corps Ferry Sq (later 28th Ferrying Sq), September 1942 – 31 March 1944
- 52nd Air Corps Ferry Sq (later 52nd Ferrying Sq), 29 August 1942 –31 March 1944
- 307th Materiel Squadron, 18 February 1942 – 1942
- 348th Air Base Squadron (later 348th Base Headquarters & Air Base Squadron): c. 28 May 1942 – 31 March 1944
- 58th Sub Depot: c. 1 January – 31 March 44
- 884th Military Police Company, Aviation (later 884th Guard Squadron): c. 28 May 1942 – c. 31 March 1944
- 340 AAF Band (later 640th Army Band, 640th AAF Band), c. 2 October 1942 – 31 March 1944

=== Stations ===
- Long Beach Municipal Airport (later Long Beach Army Air Base), California, 18 February 1942 – 31 March 1944

=== Campaign ===
Campaign Streamer	Campaign	Dates	Notes
	American Theater without inscription	18 February 1942 – 31 March 1944	California Sector, air Corps Ferrying Command (later 6th Ferrying Group)
