= 2nd Aircraft Delivery Group =

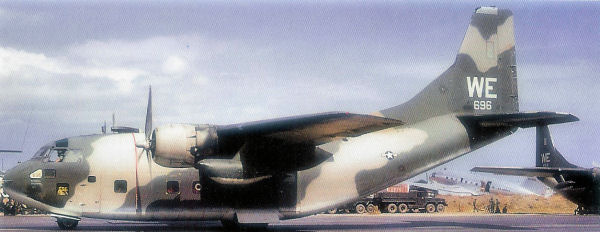
- C-123 Provider, one of the types delivered by the group during the war in Southeast Asia (Note: Aircraft is Fairchild C-123K Provider (originally a C-123B-10-FA), serial 54-0696 of the 19th Air Commando Squadron at Phan Rang Air Base in 1968. This plane was later transferred to the South Vietnam Air Force. Dirkx, Marco (8 July 2024). "1954 USAF Serial Numbers". Joe Baugher’s Serial Number List..)
- Active: 1942–1944; 1969–1994
- Country: United States
- Branch: United States Air Force
- Role: Delivery of aircraft to tactical units
- Decorations: Air Force Outstanding Unit Award

Insignia
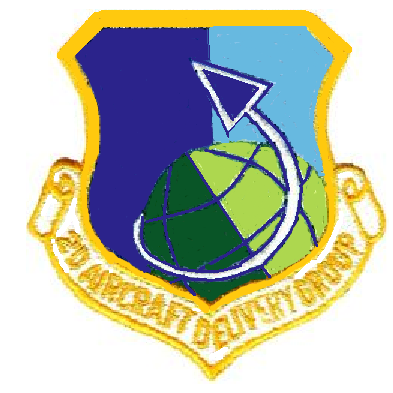
- 2nd Aircraft Delivery Group emblem

The 2nd Aircraft Delivery Group is an inactive group of the United States Air Force. While it was established in 1969 as a continuation of USAF's ferrying mission dating back to 1948, it also constituted the reactivation of a unit first established as the Northeast Sector, Air Corps Ferrying Command in February 1942 (during World War II). As the 2nd Ferrying Group, it was the first regular U.S. Army unit to employ the Women's Auxiliary Ferrying Squadron pilots, who flew all models of aircraft until that group was disbanded in 1944. Its role was to deliver aircraft to combat units. It was inactivated in June 1994.

== History ==
=== World War II ===
The group's origins can be traced to 3 January 1942, when Air Corps Ferrying Command, in the aftermath of the attack on Pearl Harbor, divided its Domestic Division into six sectors. The Northeast Sector was established at Logan Field in Dundalk, Maryland and was responsible for ferrying aircraft produced by Glenn L. Martin Company in Baltimore, Maryland; as well as Fairchild Aircraft in Hagerstown, Maryland; Piper Aircraft in Lock Haven, Pennsylvania; and Grumman Aircraft Engineering Corporation and Republic Aviation plants located in Bethpage and Farmingdale on Long Island, New York. On 21 February, this office was formally organized as a unit, the Northeast Sector, Ferrying Command and Ferrying Command's Domestic Division became the Domestic Wing, Air Corps Ferrying Command. The 4th and 12th Air Corps Ferry Squadrons were organized in early April and assigned to the group.

Ferrying Command requested the Army Air Forces (AAF) to reorganize its sectors as groups, including with assigned squadrons. Accordingly, the sector became the 2nd Ferrying Group on 26 May 1942. Shortly after this, the group moved to New Castle Army Air Field, Delaware, which was more centrally located to the plants the group served. In addition to support units, the group added the 27th Air Corps Ferry Squadron in July, the 63d Ferrying Squadron in November, and the 89th Ferrying Squadron in April 1943. The group was the first unit selected to use Women's Auxiliary Ferrying Squadron (WAFS) pilots to ferry aircraft. The 2nd Group commander limited them to flying liaison and primary training aircraft. The first leader of the WAFS detachment at New Castle was Nancy Love, who had established the program. However, she soon departed for the 5th Ferrying Group, where she was able to operate advanced trainers like the North American AT-6 Texan. these women pilots eventually flew essentially every plane in the AAF inventory. (Note: The Women's Auxiliary Ferrying Squadron pilots should not be confused with the Women Airforce Service Pilots program.)

By 1944, the AAF was finding that standard military units like the 2nd Group, whose manning was based on relatively inflexible tables of organization were not well adapted to support missions. Accordingly, the AAF adopted a more functional system in which each base was organized into a separate numbered unit. As part of this reorganization the group's headquarters was disbanded on 31 March 1944 along with its subordinate units and its resources were absorbed by the 552nd Army Air Forces Base Unit (2nd Ferrying Group), which was designated and organized on the same day. The base unit was redescribed as the 552nd AAF Base Unit (Ferry Group), then discontinued after the end of World War II on 31 December 1945.

=== Aircraft Delivery Group ===
==== Background ====
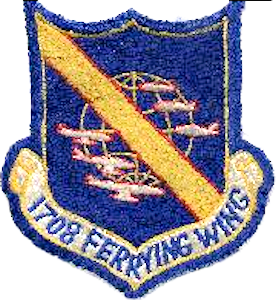
Patch with 1708th Ferrying Wing emblem

Shortly after the Air Force became an independent service, Air Materiel Command (AMC) established the 3075th Ferrying Squadron at Tinker Air Force Base, Oklahoma. The squadron was assigned directly to AMC. In 1949, it ferried the Enola Gay to the Smithsonian Institution.

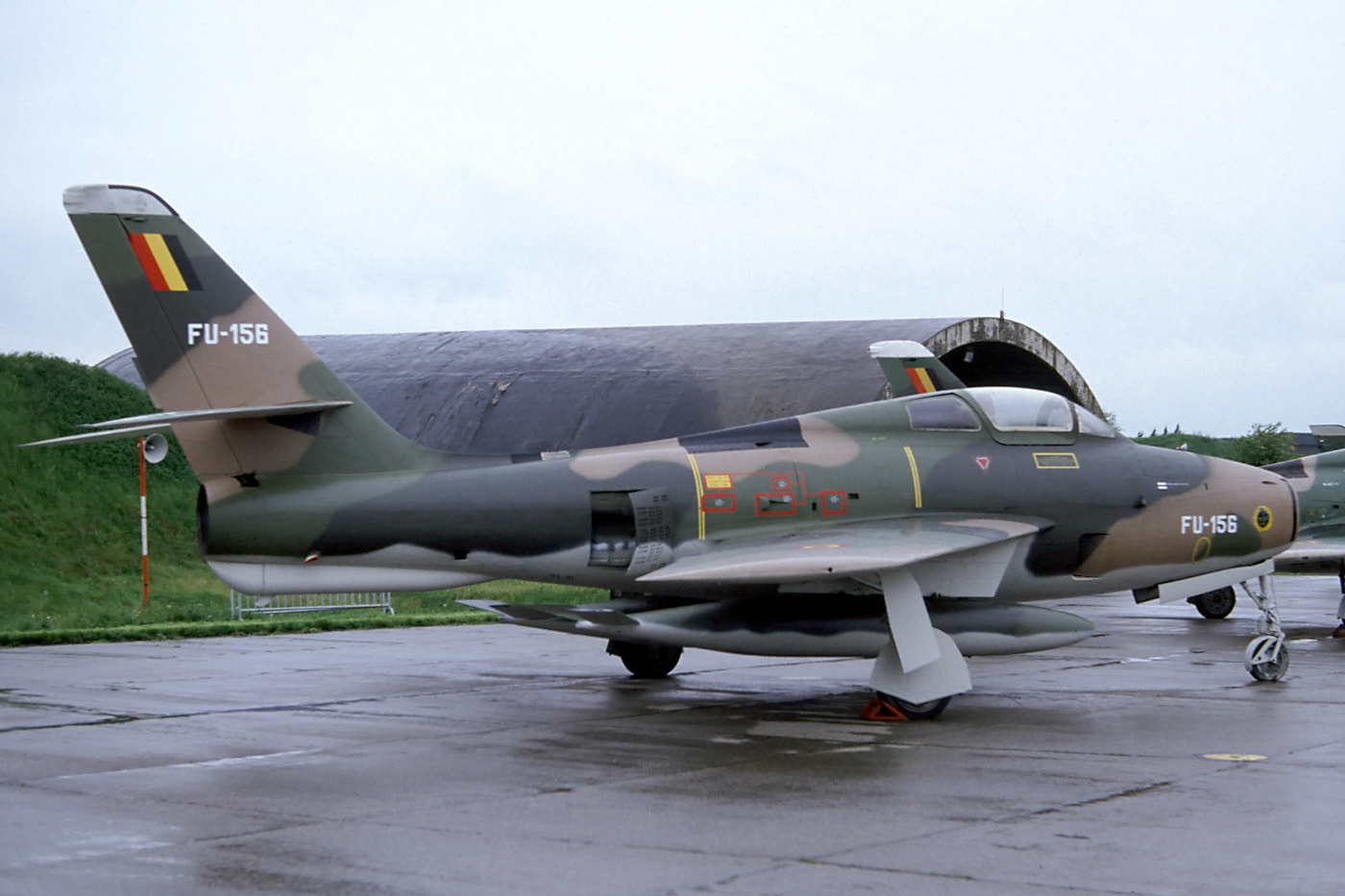
F-84F supplied to the Belgian Air Force under the MDAP program

During the Korean War, the growth of the United States Air Force called once more for the expansion of units dedicated to the delivery of aircraft to combat units. On 24 September 1950, Military Air Transport Service (MATS) formed the 1737th Ferrying Squadron at Kelly Air Force Base, Texas and assigned it to the Continental Division, MATS. On 16 June 1951, MATS expanded this operation by forming the 1708th Ferrying Group at Kelly and adding the 1738th Ferrying Squadron at Long Beach Municipal Airport, California. On 1 July 1952, the 3075th Ferrying Squadron at Tinker was transferred to the group and redesignated the 1739th Ferrying Squadron. The 1739th moved to Amarillo Air Force Base, Texas in September. The group also began delivering aircraft under Project Drop Kick, which initially focused on delivering Republic F-84 Thunderjets to NATO allies under the Mutual Defense Assistance Program. When the target date of December 1952 was not met for Drop Kick, it was replaced by Project High Flight, and the group established detachments across the North Atlantic to support it.

On 20 October 1955, the 1708th expanded to become the 1708th Ferrying Wing. On 1 July 1956, the 1738th was discontinued at Long Beach and organized the next day at Kelly.

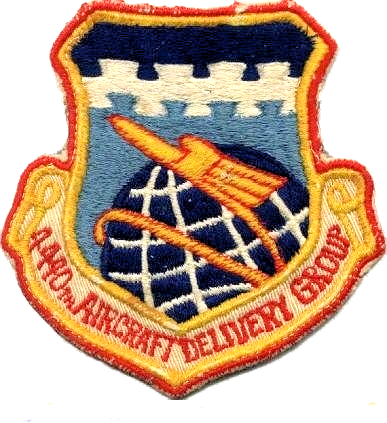
Patch with 4440th Aircraft Delivery Group emblem

MATS discontinued its ferrying units on 1 July 1958, and the aircraft delivery mission was transferred to Tactical Air Command (TAC)'s 4440th Aircraft Delivery Group, which had been organized at Langley Air Force Base, Virginia on 15 January 1958. (Note: It was originally intended to name this unit the 4440th Ferrying Group, but the name was changed before the group was activated.) The group had no squadrons assigned, but performed its mission through detachments located at key points. Its mission extended worldwide and included the delivery not only of USAF aircraft, but also aircraft supplied as part of the Military Assistance Program.

In December 1964, the 4440th Group added Special Air Missions to its aircraft delivery mission, with the assignment of the 4432nd (Chanute Air Force Base, Illinois), 4433rd (Dobbins Air Force Base, Georgia), 4434th (Randolph Air Force Base, Texas), and 4435th (Hamilton Air Force Base, California) Air Transport Squadrons. (Note: These squadrons had been formed in 1948 and had operated under various designations as the mission transferred from Bolling Field Command to Continental Air Command to TAC. See Tactical Air Command General Orders 41, 22 June 1960.) These squadrons operated aircraft transporting senior military officials throughout the United States, particularly for the United States Army.

==== Reactivation of the Group ====
However, the 4440th was a MAJCON unit, whose existence was controlled by TAC, not the Air Force. Under the USAF organization and lineage system of the time, MAJCON units' lineages (histories, awards, and battle honors) ended with their discontinuance and could never be revived.

Headquarteres, TAC decided to replace the group with an Air Force Controlled (AFCON) unit whose lineage could be revived if it were inactivated. On 15 October 1969, the group, now named the 2nd Aircraft Delivery Group was again activated and absorbed the personnel and equipment of the 4440th Group, which was simultaneously discontinued. At the same time, the 10th (Chanute), 13th (Dobbins), 21st (Randolph), and 26th Air Transport Squadrons (Hamilton) were activated to replace the 4432nd, 4433rd, 4434th and 4435th Squadrons. The Special Air Missions task was ended in September 1970 and the squadrons were inactivated. The group mission expanded to include movements of United States Navy and United States Marine Corps aircraft and the deployment of units for exercises and movement of aircraft for depot level maintenance. The group continued to manage aircraft movements, including arranging for air refueling and air-sea rescue, and en route maintenance support until inactivating in June 1994. The group's last delivery was a General Dynamics F-111F to Wright-Patterson Air Force Base, Ohio the day it was inactivated.

== Lineage ==
- Constituted 14 February 1942 as Northeast Sector, Air Corps Ferrying Command

Activated 18 February 1942
Redesignated Northeast Sector, Domestic Wing, Air Corps Ferrying Command on 25 April 1942
Redesignated 2nd Ferrying Group on 26 May 1942
Disbanded 31 March 1944

- Reconstituted on 5 September 1969 and redesignated 2nd Aircraft Delivery Group

Activated on 15 October 1969
Inactivated on 30 June 1994

=== Assignments ===
- Domestic Wing, Air Corps Ferrying Command (later Ferrying Division, Air Transport Command) 18 February 1942 – 31 March 1944
- Tactical Air Command, 15 October 1969
- Air Combat Command, 1 June 1992 – 1 July 1994

=== Stations ===
- Logan Field, Maryland, 18 February 1942
- New Castle Army Air Field, Delaware, 29 May 1942 – 31 March 1944
- Langley Air Force Base, Virginia, 15 October 1969 – 1 July 1994

=== Components ===
- 4th Air Corps Ferry Squadron (later 4th Ferrying Squadron), 7 April 1942 – 31 March 1944
- 10th Air Transport Squadron, 15 October 1969 – 30 September 1970
- 12th Air Corps Ferry Squadron (later 12th Ferrying Squadron), 8 April 1942 – 31 March 1944
- 13th Air Transport Squadron, 15 October 1969 – 30 September 1970
- 21st Air Transport Squadron, 15 October 1969 – 30 September 1970
- 26th Air Transport Squadron, 15 October 1969 – 30 September 1970
- 27th Air Corps Ferry Squadron (later 27th Ferrying Squadron), 17 July 1942 – 31 March 1944
- 63d Ferrying Squadron, 1 November 1942 – 31 March 1944
- 89th Ferrying Squadron, 15 April 1943 – 31 March 1944
- 344th Air Base Squadron (later 344th Base Headquarters and Air Base Squadron), 29 May 1942 – 31 March 1944
- 891st Guard Squadron, 28 July 1942 – 31 March 1944
- 343rd Sub Depot, c. 1 January 1944 – 31 March 1944

=== Awards and campaigns ===
Award streamer	Award	Dates	Notes
	Air Force Outstanding Unit Award	1 January 1985 – 31 December 1986	2nd Aircraft Delivery Group
	Air Force Outstanding Unit Award	1 June 1991 – 31 May 1993	2nd Aircraft Delivery Group

Campaign Streamer	Campaign	Dates	Notes
	American Theater without inscription	21 February 1942 – 31 March 1944	Northeast Sector Air Corps Ferrying Command (later 2nd Ferrying Group)
