= William O. Eareckson =

US Air Force officer and recipient of the Purple Heart medal

William Olmstead Eareckson
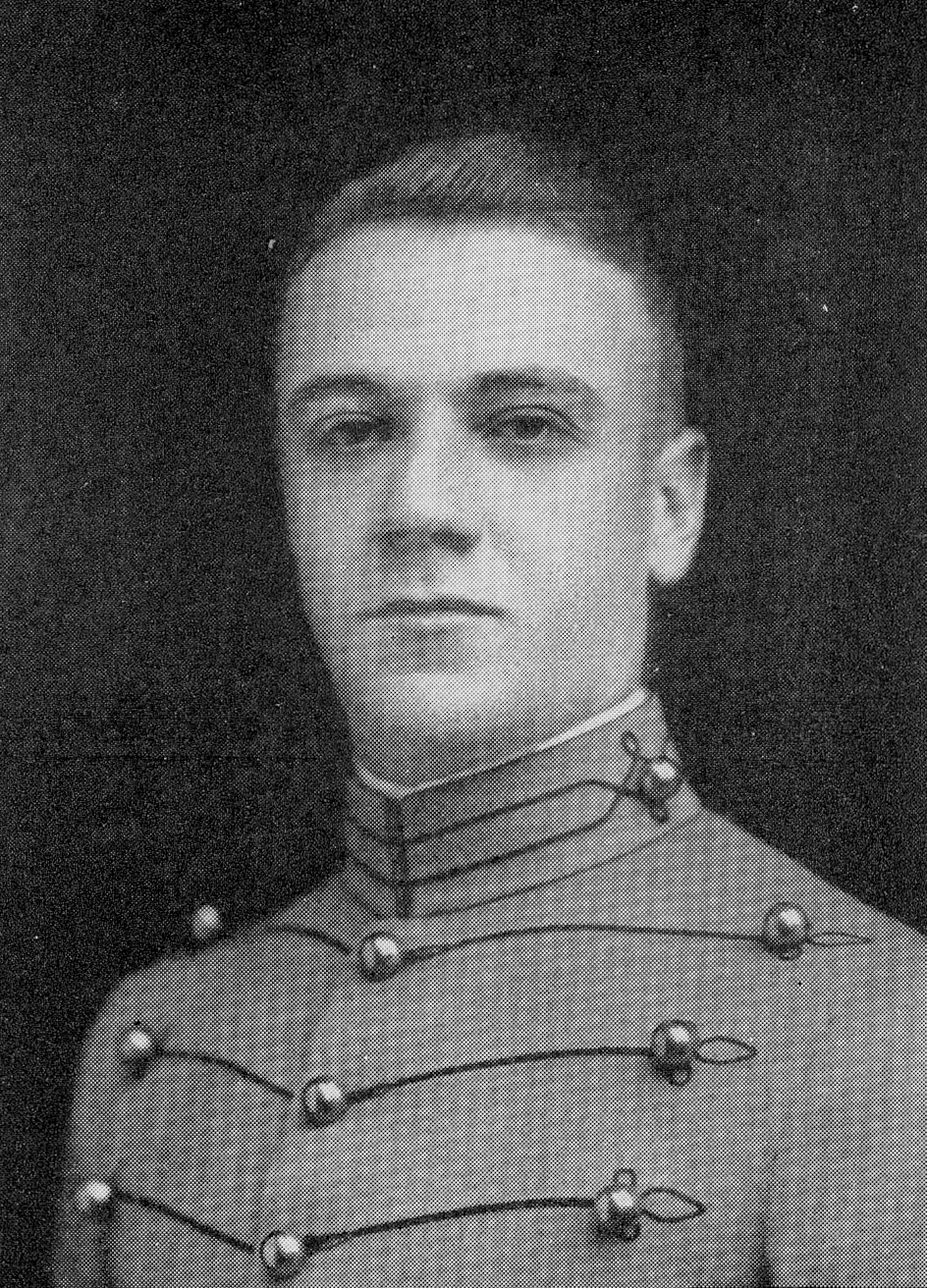
- At West Point in 1924
- Born: May 30, 1900; Kent Island, Maryland, U.S.
- Died: October 25, 1966 (aged 66); Sarasota, Florida, U.S.
- Burial place: Arlington National Cemetery
- Military career
- Allegiance: United States of America
- Branch: United States Army / United States Army Air Forces
- Service years: 1917-1924 / 1924-1954
- Rank: Colonel
- Nickname: "Eric"
- Commands: 36th Bomb Squadron; XI Bomber Command; Alamogordo Army Air Field; Army Section for Air, Rio de Janeiro, Brazil; CFB Goose Bay; 580th Air Resupply and Communications Wing
- Conflicts: World War I; World War II; Battle of the Aleutian Islands; Battle of Makin; Battle of Tarawa; Korean War
- Awards: Distinguished Service Cross; Navy Cross; Silver Star; Legion of Merit; Distinguished Flying Cross; Purple Heart (2); Air Medal

Colonel William "Eric" Olmstead Eareckson (May 30, 1900 – October 25, 1966) was a U.S. Army Air Forces combat commander during the World War II Battle of the Aleutian Islands. He was awarded the Distinguished Service Cross and the Navy Cross for his heroic actions during World War II.

== Biography ==
William Olmstead Eareckson was born on Kent Island, Maryland on May 30, 1900, the son of Thomas B Eareckson and Sarah Caroline Eareckson (née Tucker).

Eareckson enlisted in the Army at age 17 and fought in France during World War I, where he was wounded. After the war, he remained in the Army and received a presidential appointment to West Point. While at West Point, he composed a fight song for the football team titled "Gridiron Grenadiers". After graduation in 1924, he attended pilot training, but washed out. He then successfully applied to become a balloon pilot.

In 1928, then-Lieutenant Eareckson, together with Captain William E. Kepner, won the National Balloon Elimination Race and the accompanying Paul W. Litchfield Trophy. It was only two years later, at the age of 30, that Eareckson finally won his airplane pilot rating. In 1939, he was given command of the 36th Bombardment Squadron.

During the Aleutians fighting, Eareckson was famed for his innovative tactics. For example, on August 17, 1942, he used radar-equipped B-17s to guide P-38s to a position from where they shot down two of three raiding Japanese Kawanishi H6K bombers. He also pioneered low-level bombing raids against the enemy to counteract the effects of the consistently poor and unpredictable Aleutian weather.

During the Battle of Attu, Eareckson joined front line infantrymen, borrowed a rifle, and entered the fray – but was quickly wounded by a Japanese sniper. He was awarded a Purple Heart, but was castigated by General Simon Bolivar Buckner, Jr., Commander of the Alaska Defense Command, for "being where you had no business being". Buckner was later killed in the Battle of Okinawa by Japanese artillery while he was near the front line.

In early 1943, midway through the Aleutians campaign, Eareckson was transferred to General Buckner's staff as Deputy Chief of Staff for the Eleventh Air Force. He continued to lead combat missions in that capacity. Later, he became a member of Admiral Chester Nimitz's staff. Nimitz, the Commander in Chief of the Pacific Area, had earlier presented Eareckson with a Navy Cross to complement the Distinguished Service Cross, Silver Star and other combat decorations he had earned in the Aleutians.

He served as the Support Aircraft Commander, Fifth Amphibious Force, South Pacific where he took part in the planning for the Hollandia-Aitape landings and served as Support Aircraft Commander aboard the amphibious command ship at the Makin and Tarawa landings. Following his return to the United States, he was assigned as commander of the Alamogordo Army Air Field in New Mexico and during this time, when the first detonation of a nuclear weapon occurred in New Mexico, he was tasked in issuing a statement claiming that the massive explosion from the detonation was due to 'a remotely located ammunition magazine containing a considerable amount of high explosive and pyrotechnics.'

During the Korean War, Eareckson served as an Air Liaison Officer with X Corps from September to December 1950, for which he received the Legion of Merit. Although widely respected for his bravery and leadership skills, Eareckson was viewed by some of his Army Air Forces superiors as caustic, outspoken, and difficult to control. These liabilities prevented him from being considered for promotion. When he retired as a colonel in 1954, he had held that rank for 13 years.

He died in Sarasota, Florida on October 25, 1966, and was buried at Arlington National Cemetery.

== Awards and honors ==

USAF Command Pilot
Distinguished Service Cross
Navy Cross	Silver Star	Legion of Merit
Distinguished Flying Cross	Purple Heart with bronze oak leaf cluster	Air Medal
Army Commendation Medal	World War I Victory Medal with battle clasp	American Defense Service Medal with bronze service star
American Campaign Medal	Asiatic-Pacific Campaign Medal with four bronze campaign stars	World War II Victory Medal
Army of Occupation Medal with 'Japan' clasp	National Defense Service Medal	Korean Service Medal with Arrowhead device and two bronze campaign stars
Air Force Longevity Service Award with silver and bronze oak leaf clusters	United Nations Korea Medal	Republic of Korea War Service Medal

=== Distinguished Service Cross ===

Eareckson, William O.
Colonel (Air Corps), U.S Army Air Forces
23d Composite Group, Eleventh Air Force
Date of Action: June 3, 1942 to June 18, 1942
Headquarters, Alaska Defense Command, General Orders No. 61 (July 16, 1942)

Citation:

"The President of the United States of America, authorized by Act of Congress July 9, 1918, takes pleasure in presenting the Distinguished Service Cross to Colonel (Air Corps) William Olmstead Eareckson, United States Army Air Forces, for extraordinary heroism in connection with military operations against an armed enemy in aerial combat while serving as Pilot of a Martin B-26 Marauder Medium Bomber and as Commander, 23d Composite Group, Eleventh Air Force, in action against the Japanese forces in the Aleutian Area, 3 June 1942 to 18 June 1942. From the time of the initial attack on Dutch Harbor he declined to conduct the operations of his Group in the normal manner. Instead of remaining in the comparative safety of his headquarters, he repeatedly took to the air in direct personal attacks against the enemy and personally filled the gap on numerous flights by acting in every capacity from first pilot to that of gunner. This example of intrepid leadership, in utter disregard of his own personal safety was the spark that inspired his entire command to heroic efforts in the face of tremendous obstacles of weather, terrain and enemy opposition. His conspicuous example of courage and leadership is worthy of the highest praise and reflect great credit upon himself, the 11th Air Force, and the United States Army Air Forces."

=== Navy Cross citation ===

Eareckson, William O.
Colonel (Air Corps), U.S Army Air Forces
Bomber Command, Eleventh Air Force
Date of Action: June 1942 to August 1942

Citation:

The President of the United States of America takes pleasure in presenting the Navy Cross to Colonel (Air Corps) William Olmstead Eareckson, United States Army Air Forces, for extraordinary heroism while participating in aerial flight while serving with the Bomber Command, Eleventh Air Force, during the seizure and occupation of enemy-held Attu Island, Territory of Alaska, from June 1942 to August 1942. Upon one occasion during these operations, Colonel Eareckson personally piloted his B-26 aircraft into a fog-shrouded and narrow pass on Attu Island to lead a supply plane to a group of U.S. troops suffering from exhaustion and frostbite. The supplies thus delivered undoubtedly contributed materially to the saving of their lives. Throughout the assault on Attu, Colonel Eareckson repeatedly flew extremely close to enemy anti-aircraft gun positions, deliberately drawing their fire, thus causing them to reveal their positions. He followed up these tactics by directing air attacks against the enemy positions so revealed, which resulted in neutralizing or destroying them. In addition, Colonel Eareckson made daily reconnaissance flights over and around Attu Island, and did so on days on which low ceiling and visibility prevented all other aircraft from taking off. His conduct throughout was in accordance with the highest traditions of the United States Military and Naval Forces.

=== Namesake ===
Eareckson Air Station, a military airbase located on the island of Shemya in the Alaskan Aleutian Islands, is named after Eareckson.
