= Eleventh Air Force =

US Air Force division in Alaska

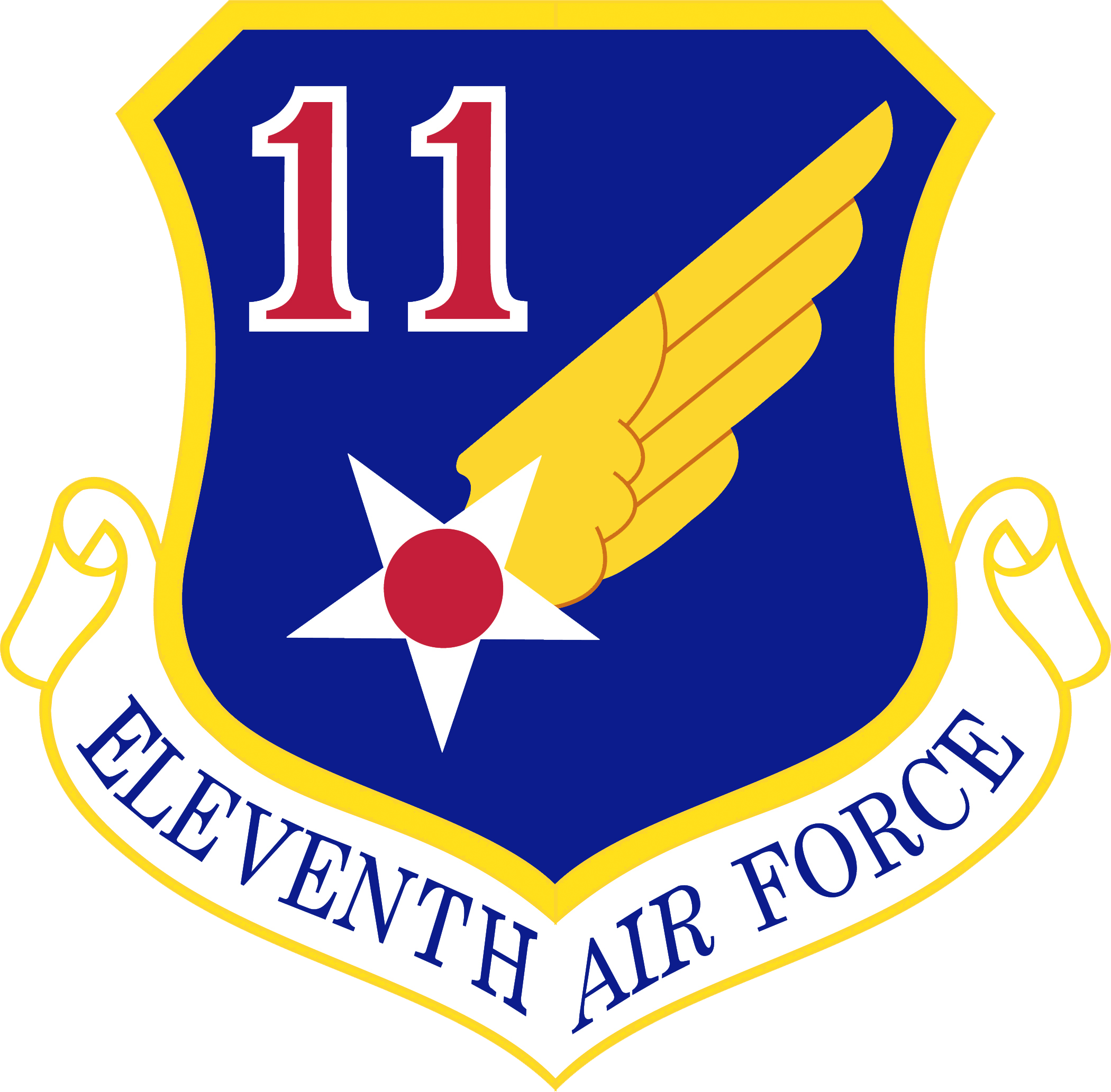
- Shield of the Eleventh Air Force
- Active: 9 August 1990 – present (as Eleventh Air Force); 18 December 1945 – 9 August 1990 (as Alaskan Air Command); 18 September 1942 – 18 December 1945 (as Eleventh Air Force); 5 February 1942 – 18 September 1942 (as 11 Air Force); 28 December 1941 – 5 February 1942 (as Alaskan Air Force) (84 years, 8 months)
- Country: United States of America
- Branch: United States Air Force (18 September 1947 – present); United States Army ( Army Air Forces, 28 December 1941 – 18 September 1947)
- Type: Numbered Air Force
- Role: Provide combat-ready air forces for U.S. Pacific Command and Alaskan Command, along with serving as the air component for Alaskan Command and the Alaskan NORAD Region
- Part of: Pacific Air Forces; United States Northern Command; Alaskan Command; Alaskan NORAD Region
- Headquarters: Elmendorf Air Force Base, Joint Base Elmendorf–Richardson, Alaska, U.S.
- Engagements: World War II - Asiatic-Pacific Theater: Aleutian Islands

- Decorations: Air Force Organizational Excellence Award Air Force Outstanding Unit Award

Commanders
- Current commander: Lieutenant General Robert D. Davis
- Deputy Commander: Col Philip D. Lancaster
- Senior Enlisted Leader: Chief Master Sergeant Heath T. Tempel

The Eleventh Air Force (11 AF) is a Numbered Air Force of the United States Air Force Pacific Air Forces (PACAF). It is headquartered at Joint Base Elmendorf–Richardson, Alaska. (Note: This unit is not related to the Eleventh Air Force headquartered in Pennsylvania described below.)

11 AF plans, conducts, controls and coordinates air operations in accordance with the tasks assigned by the commander, Pacific Air Forces, and is the force provider for Alaskan Command, the Alaska North American Aerospace Defense Command Region and other unified commanders. The Commander, Eleventh Air Force, also serves as Commander, Alaskan Command, and as commander of the Alaskan North American Aerospace Defense Command Region. The NORAD mission is accomplished largely through the PACAF Regional Support Center (PRSC), the 611th Air and Space Operations Center, and units of the Alaska Air National Guard (AK ANG). Together, they carry out air surveillance, and command and control forces that provide tactical warning and attack assessment in defense of Alaska.

Established on 28 December 1941 as the Alaskan Air Force at Elmendorf Field, Alaska Territory. it was initially part of the United States Army Air Forces. It provided air defense of Alaska during World War II and fought in the Aleutian Islands Campaign. It was re-designated as the Alaskan Air Command in late 1945, and became responsible for the air defense of Alaska. With the collapse of the Soviet Union, it was transferred to the control of PACAF in 1990 and reduced to the status of a Numbered Air Force.

== History ==
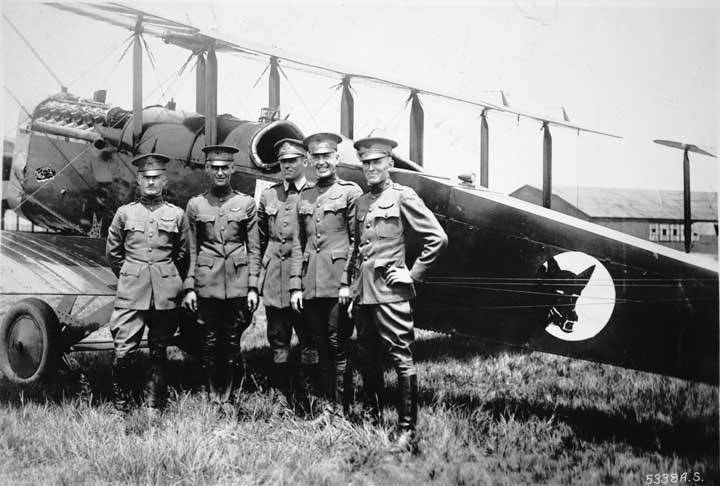
Capt. St. Clair Streett (at left) with pilots of the 1920 Alaskan Flying Expedition

Military aircraft began flying in Alaska in 1920 when the Black Wolf Squadron, or The Alaska Flying Expedition, made The New York to Nome Flight. Capt. St. Clair Streett commanded 7 men in 4 DH-4s as they took off from Mitchel Field on 17 July 1920. Each plane had a black profile of a Wolf's head painted on their sides. The trip organizer, Billy Mitchell wanted to establish an airway to Alaska and Asia. The 9349 mile round trip route included flying west to North Dakota, then north through Saskatchewan, Alberta, British Columbia, the Yukon, and onwards to Fairbanks on 19 Aug. and finally Nome on the 23rd. They started their return trip on the 31st, landing Mitchel Field on 20 Oct. 1920 after 112 flying hours.

In 1924, the around the world flight by the Army using Douglas "World Cruiser"s also transited though Alaska. However, the first permanently based military aircraft began to deploy to Alaska during the last half of 1940 after the breakout of World War II in Europe and tensions began to deteriorate with Japan. To coordinate air activities there, the Alaskan Defense Command established the Air Field Forces, Alaskan Defense Command on 29 May 1941.

=== Origins ===
World War II emblem

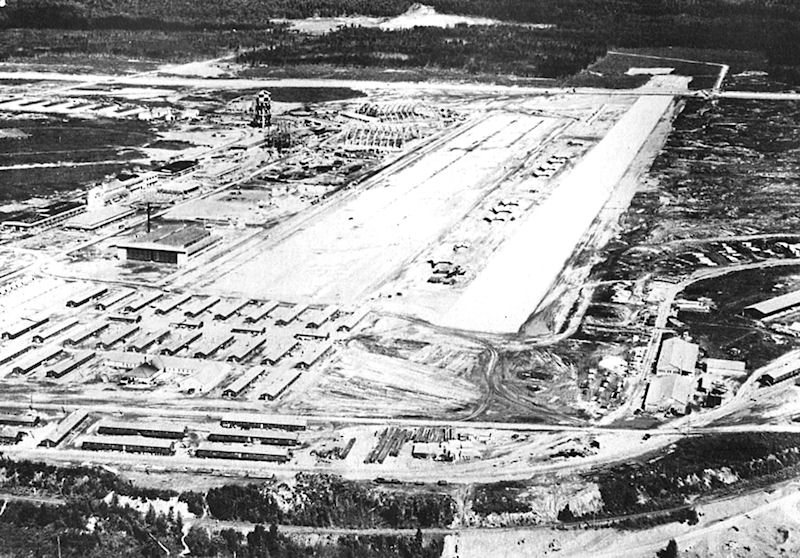
Elmendorf Field, August 1941

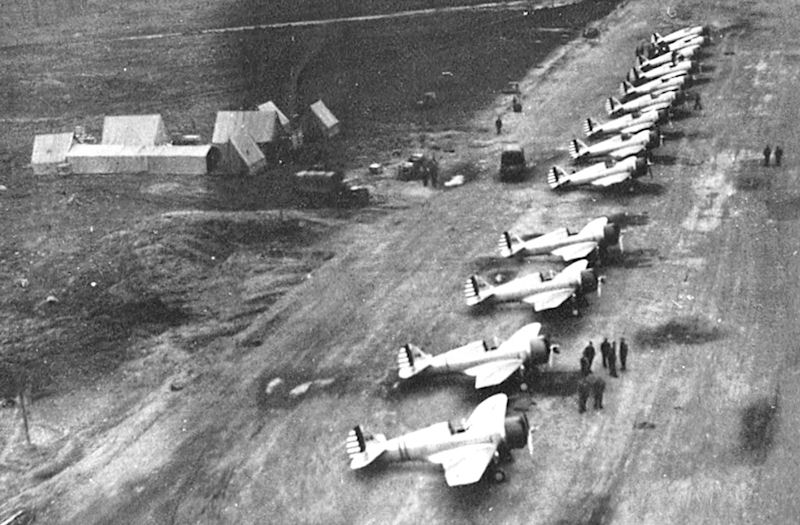
18th Pursuit Squadron P-36 Hawks, Elmendorf, August 1941

Early in 1940, the question of air defense of the Alaska Territory came into the limelight when President Roosevelt pointed out in his message to Congress requesting funds for fortification of Guam and Wake Islands and other strategic points in the Pacific that airfields were needed in Alaska. The original request for $12,000,000 to be appropriated for the construction of Alaskan defenses was cut to $600,000, but still was sufficient to begin the construction of an air base at Anchorage, Alaska. Thus was begun the construction of Elmendorf Field, primary fourth-echelon base for all future Eleventh Air Force operations. Construction of the airfield began on 8 June when 25 locally hired men began clearing brush, the Army intending it to be a permanent airfield.

The first "troops" of the Alaskan Air Force advance echelon to arrive in Alaska included a six-year-old Martin B-10 on 12 August 1940. On 12 December the Army designated the base Fort Richardson and flying field Elmendorf Field. The post was named for Brig Gen Wilds P. Richardson, former head of the Alaska Road Commission; the airfield and flying facilities were named Elmendorf Field in honor of Captain Hugh M. Elmendorf, killed in 1933 while flight testing an experimental fighter near Wright Field, Ohio.

The first Air Corps unit to be assigned to Alaska was the 18th Pursuit Squadron, which transferred to Elmendorf from Hamilton Army Airfield, California on 21 February 1941 with Curtiss P-40 Warhawks. The 23d Air Base Group was assigned shortly afterwards to provide base support. The 36th Bombardment Squadron arrived less than a month later from Lowry Field, Colorado, equipped with Douglas B-18 Bolo medium bombers.

A major problem was the training of personnel and the preparing of equipment for operation in the cold Alaskan climate. Mechanical things showed unusual behavior at 40 degrees below zero. Oil became almost solid, metal and rubber brittle and fractured easily. At the same time, Texas-trained pilots had to learn to fly in a country where sudden fogs could close out airports in less than 10 minutes and high-velocity "williwaws" could tear the wings off combat planes.

The first months activities of the new command were spent in reconnaissance for a rim of defense bases. The hub of this defense "wheel" was to be at Elmendorf Field near Anchorage. In the meantime, plans for the establishment of bases were moving slowly. Certain planned fields had to be constructed in summer, because the severe Alaskan frost in winter made construction impossible, but equipment for the construction of fields north of Nome and around Anchorage failed to arrive, and construction was postponed until the following summer. Construction had been completed, however, on two important coastal fields in southeastern Alaska, Annette Army Airfield at Annette Island and Yakutat Army Airfield at Yakutat, and the first direct all-weather air route to Alaska from Seattle was open.

An extremely fortunate accident took place in October 1941, which possibly changed the whole course of World War II in Alaska. Equipment for the construction of a CAA-DLA (Civil Aeronautics Authority-Defense Land Appropriation) airfield at McGrath, on the mainland, arrived too late to begin construction of the field, since the ground already had become frozen, and General Buckner requested and received permission to divert the equipment and men to Cold Bay on the Alaskan Peninsula and Otter Point on Umnak Island, to build two airfields for the defense of the Naval Base at Dutch Harbor. To conceal their purpose, both fields were organized as ostensible business enterprises concerned with fishing and canning. The two cover names were: "Blair Packing Company" and "Saxton & Company", whose peculiar canning equipment consisted of bulldozers, power shovels and similar construction equipment. The top holding-company for these enterprises was the "Consolidated Packing Company" of Anchorage, known in military circles as the Alaskan Defense Command. Security was complete. Japanese intelligence never learned of the existence of these airfields and the Japanese tactical decisions were based on the assumption that their attack on Dutch Harbor would not be opposed by land-based aircraft.

All through the winter of 1941–1942, men worked at the construction of these two air bases, and by spring, two 5,000-foot airstrips were completed, one at Cold Bay (Fort Randall Army Airfield), the other at Otter Point on Umnak (Fort Glenn Army Airfield). Another vital factor in the construction of the Umnak field was the use of perforated steel matting. No other medium could have been used to build that runway in the time required, since Umnak has no natural construction material. The matting was laid over a graded gash in the tundra and set the pattern for the construction of future Aleutian runways.

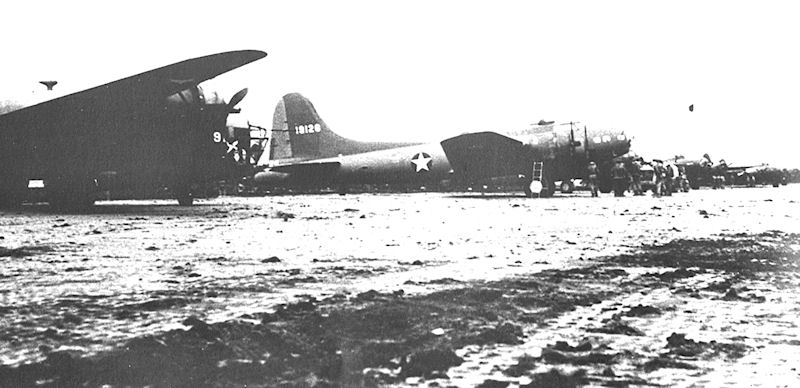
LB-30 and B-17E of the 36th Bombardment Squadron at Unmnak (Fort Glenn AAF), June 1942. The B-17E (41–9126) was lost on 28 August 1942

Administratively speaking, the Eleventh Air Force also was born in that winter of 1941–1942. First conceived as the Air Force, Alaskan Defense Command, it emerged as an integral unit as the Alaskan Air Force on 15 January 1942, and was redesignated the Eleventh Air Force on 5 February. In May 1942, a field headquarters was established at Fort Morrow Army Airfield, Port Heiden, Alaska, and planes of the 73d Bombardment Squadron were deployed at Fort Randall Army Airfield, Cold Bay and the 21st Bombardment Squadron at Fort Glenn Army Airfield, Umnak.

Ladd Field near Fairbanks became a secondary major air base in Alaska. It was named after Major Arthur K. Ladd, killed in a flying accident near Dale, South Carolina on 13 December 1935. Unlike Elmendorf, Ladd Field came the jurisdiction of Ferrying Command, which was a part of the Lend-Lease Program. Through Lend-Lease, the United States transferred nearly 8,000 aircraft to the Soviet Union though Ladd Field during the course of World War II. The aircraft were flown into Ladd from Great Falls Airfield, Montana by American civilian aircrews; Soviet crews then flew the planes west through Nome (Marks Field) and on to Siberia. The pilots leaving Great Falls flew along a route of small airfields that became known as the Northwest Staging Route. One of those airfields, Big Delta Army Airfield, southeast of Fairbanks, became Fort Greely.

=== Aleutian Campaign 1942 ===
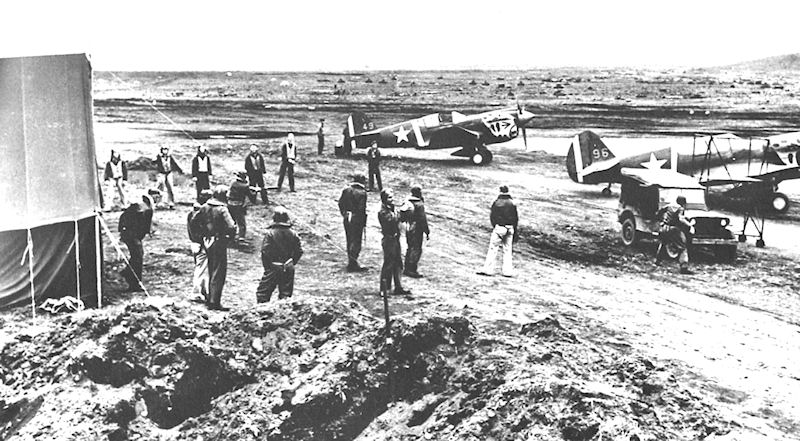
11th Fighter Squadron on alert at Fort Glenn AAF June 1942

In mid-1942 the Imperial Japanese Navy laid plans to attack Alaska in conjunction with an attack on Midway Island in the central Pacific. The Japanese Northern Area Fleet's attacks on Dutch Harbor and Adak Island resulted in the Aleutian Islands Campaign. But because United States Naval intelligence had broken the Japanese naval cypher code, Admiral Nimitz, Commander-in-Chief Pacific Ocean Areas in Hawaii, learned of Japanese plans by 21 May 1942. As of 1 June 1942, United States military strength in Alaska stood at 45,000 men. On that day the XI Intercepter Command, activated earlier, in March, was redesignated the XI Fighter Command. However, Eleventh Air Force operational strength was small. It consisted of 10 B-17 Flying Fortress heavy bombers and 34 B-18 Bolo medium bombers at Elmendorf Airfield, and 95 P-40 Warhawk fighters divided between Fort Randall AAF at Cold Bay and Fort Glenn AAF on Umnak.

When the first inklings of a possible Japanese attack on the Aleutian Islands were known, the Eleventh Air Force was ordered to send out reconnaissance aircraft to locate the Japanese fleet reported heading toward Dutch Harbor and attack it with bombers, concentrating on sinking Hosogaya's two aircraft carriers. Once the enemy planes were removed, Task Force 8/North Pacific Force of the Navy, under Rear-Admiral Robert A. Theobald, would engage the enemy fleet and destroy it. On the afternoon of 2 June a naval patrol plane spotted the approaching Japanese fleet, reporting its location as 800 miles southwest of Dutch Harbor. Eleventh Air Force was placed on full alert. Shortly thereafter bad weather set in, and no further sightings of the fleet were made that day.

==== Attack on Dutch Harbor ====
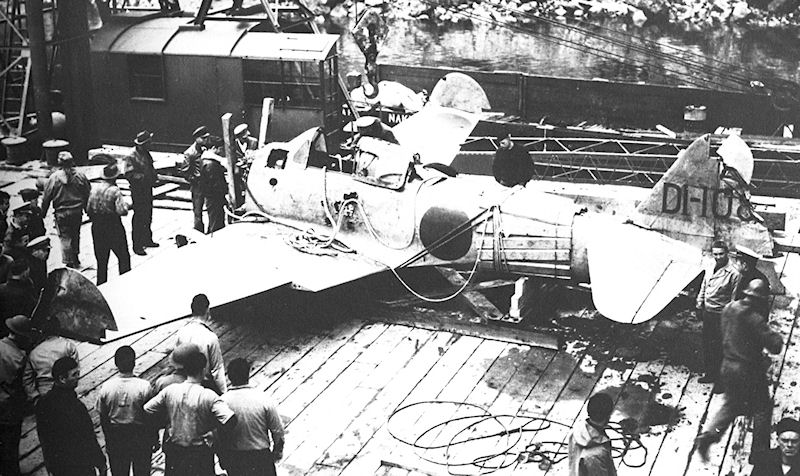
Downed Japanese Zero captured intact by U.S. forces in July 1942 on Akutan Island, after the Dutch Harbor Attack. Dubbed the Akutan Zero, it became the first flyable Zero acquired by the United States during the Second World War. It was repaired and made its first test flight in the U.S. on 20 September 1942

The first aerial bombing of the American continent during World War II took place on 3 and 4 June 1942, when two Japanese raids were made on the Dutch Harbor in the city of Unalaska, Alaska. While the first did little damage, the second destroyed the base's oil storage tanks, part of the hospital, and damaged a beached barracks ship. Although American pilots had finally located the Japanese carriers, attempts to destroy them proved fruitless. As bad weather again set in, all contact with the enemy fleet was lost.

In all, the Japanese raid claimed 43 U.S. lives, of which 33 were soldiers. Another 64 Americans were wounded. Eleven U.S. planes were downed, while the Japanese lost ten aircraft. During the two-day fight, Naval Task Force 8 had remained south of Kodiak Island, taking no part in the action. On 5 June, it received a report of enemy warships in the Bering Sea heading south toward Unalaska Island, which was interpreted to be a landing force intent upon seizing Dutch Harbor. While Task Force 8 entered the Bering Sea, Hosogaya's fleet moved south to join Yamamoto, who had just suffered the loss of his four large carriers at the Battle of Midway.

==== Possible attack at Nome ====
By mid-June the Joint Chiefs of Staff theorized that the attack on the Aleutian Islands and the occupation of its westernmost islands might be part of a holding action designed to screen a northward thrust by Japanese forces into Siberia's maritime provinces and the Kamchatka Peninsula. As a result of their concern about a possible Japanese attack upon the Soviet Union that might also include the occupation of St. Lawrence Island in the Bering Sea and of nearby Nome and its adjacent airfields on the Alaskan mainland.

Supporting the possibility of an invasion of the Alaskan mainland were reports of a Japanese fleet operating in the Bering Sea. Three separate sightings placed an enemy fleet somewhere between the Pribilof and St. Lawrence Islands, suggesting that either an enemy raid on or an outright invasion of the Alaskan mainland was imminent, with Nome the likely objective. As a result, within thirty-six hours, Eleventh Air Force using commandeered civilian aircraft flew nearly 2,300 troops to Nome, along with artillery and antiaircraft guns and several tons of other equipment and supplies. Consolidated B-24 Liberator bombers of the 404th Bombardment Squadron were sent to the Air Transport Command Marks Army Airfield with a mission to locate and attack the Japanese Fleet.

Not until late July when United States intelligence reported with some certainty the departure of Hosogaya's fleet from the Bering Sea did the threat of invasion of the Alaskan mainland decline, allowing for the redeployment of many of the troops hastily assembled at Nome.

==== United States response ====
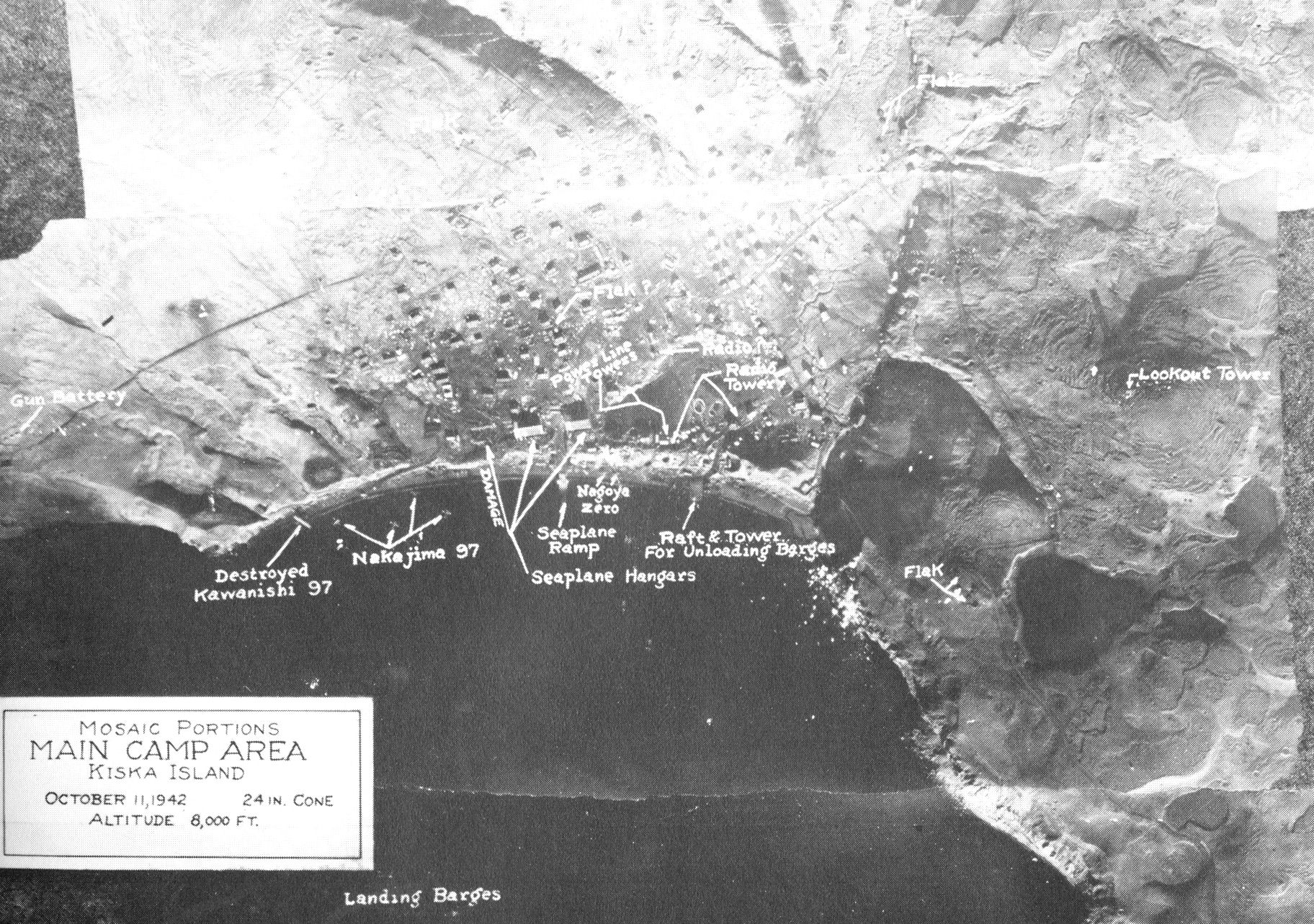
Aerial reconnaissance of Kiska, 11 October 1942

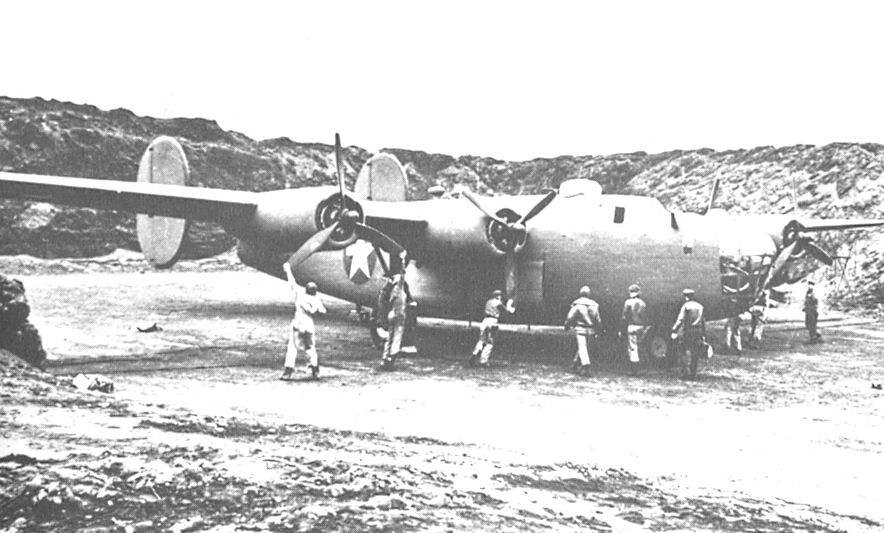
B-24 Liberator of the 404th Bombardment Squadron in a revetment, 1942

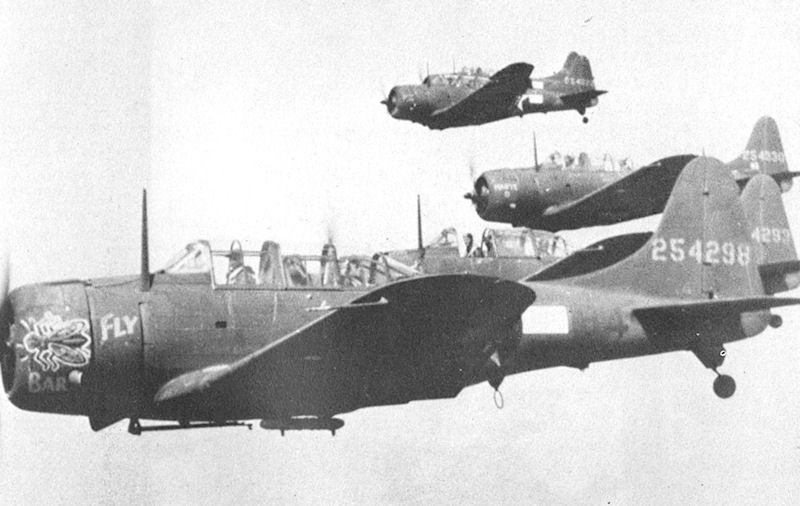
A-24 Banshee Dive Bombers, used in attacks on Kiska and Attu by the 635th Bombardment Squadron (Dive)

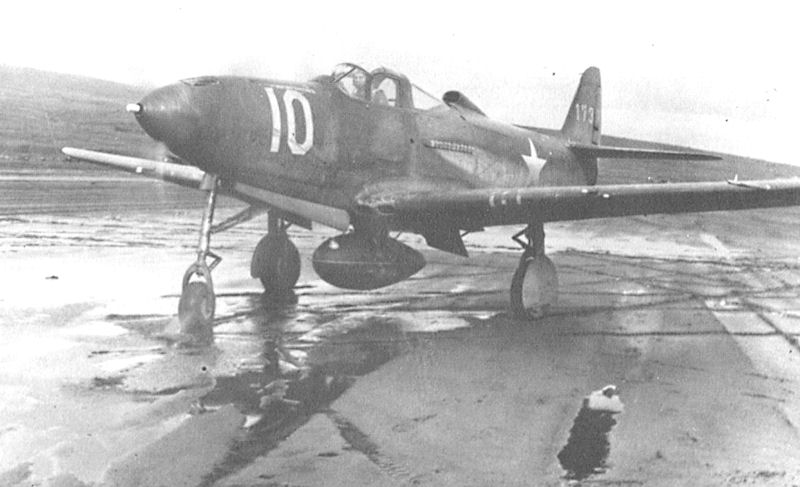
P-39E Airacobra used by the 42d Fighter Squadron, deployed to Davis Army Airfield, Adak in October 1942

On 30 August 1942, in the face of a howling gale, American Army troops went ashore on Adak Island, some 250 miles east of Kiska. Adak affords a good fleet anchorage, a sheltered harbor and as was revealed later, a superlative site for quick construction of an airfield. The 807th Army Aviation Engineering Battalion set to work constructing a dike and draining the tidal flat between Kuluk Bay and the Sweeper Cove areas to create an airfield. Only ten days later engineers built a runway, and on 10 September the first aircraft, a B-18, landed at "Longview Army Airfield". Three days later there were 15 B-24s, a B-17, 15 P-38s and 16 P-39s on the island. On 12 September, the first air attack from Adak, consisting of 12 B-24s, 14 P-38s and 14 P-39s, was launched under the command of Major John S. Chennault of the 343d Fighter Group. The attack was launched against Japanese positions on Kiska. The airfield on Adak was renamed "Davis Army Airfield" in honor of Colonel Everett S. Davis, the first Commander, Eleventh Air Force, killed in an aircraft accident on 28 November 1942.

Throughout the winter of 1942–1943, the Eleventh Air Force bombed Kiska and Attu whenever possible, although the flyers were extremely handicapped by the almost constant fog which covered the island. At the same time, the bases to the east of Adak were consolidated and built up. In October, the Field Headquarters of the Eleventh Air Force was closed at Kodiak and moved to Davis AAF.

On 11 January 1943, American Army troops went ashore on the unoccupied Amchitka Island, barely 75 statute miles from Kiska, and a month later, on 16 February, the first aircraft, a P-38 and a P-40, landed on Amchitka Army Airfield, a quickly-built airstrip. The first mission against Kiska was flown on 18 February.

By March, both medium and heavy bombers could make the short hop from Amchitka to Kiska and on good days, rare enough, crews flew as many as four and occasionally six sorties per day. It was said that the Japanese needed no air warning system on Kiska, because they could hear the Eleventh Air Force bombers warming up on Amchitka, and knew from the sound of the engines when the raids were taking off.

Throughout this period, the striking power of the Eleventh Air Force included only three squadrons of medium bombers, three squadrons of heavies and four squadrons of fighters. An additional squadron of P-39 Airacobras operated in the Aleutian theater for a short while, but their light landing gear was unsatisfactory for use on the rough fields and they were returned to the States.

Tactically, the Eleventh Air Force was operating under the jurisdiction of the Navy, since Alaska was still in the situation of a "fleet-opposed invasion". The air arm, designated Task Force "X", was commanded by General Butler, and included the Air Striking Group (Eleventh Air Force) and the Air Search Group (Naval Fleet Air Wing Four). Overall command was vested in Vice Admiral Thomas Kinkaid, Commander, North Pacific Force, abbreviated to ComNorPacFor or ComNorPac.

==== Recapture of Attu and Kiska ====
On 1 April, a plan to by-pass Kiska and capture Attu was presented to the Joint Chiefs of Staff, was approved, and on 11 May, American troops went ashore on Attu. In a short and fierce battle, the Japanese garrison was wiped out, and on 29 May, the island was declared secure. The first plane, a hospital C-47, landed on a newly completed runway at Alexai Point Army Airfield, Attu, on 7 June. The operation against Attu also included the occupation of the Semichi Islands, an archipelago of three tiny bits of land some 35 miles east of Attu. The flattest of these, Shemya, was to be the site of the most important American air base for future operations. Barely four miles long and only two miles wide, Shemya Army Airfield became, literally, a stationary aircraft carrier. These islands were taken without opposition, on 29 May.

With Kiska cut off by the occupation of Attu, the Japanese made plans to evacuate the Aleutian Islands. Numerous sorties were made by the Japanese Fifth Fleet, based at Paramushiru, but finally on 28 July, under cover of a thick fog, destroyers were able to enter Kiska Harbor and remove all occupation troops. When American troops went ashore on 15 August, the island was deserted, ending the Aleutian Campaign.

Six million pounds of bombs had been dropped on Kiska and Attu in Eleventh Air Force operations. The Japanese had been prevented from building an air field and from bringing in reinforcements. 'Rufe' seaplane fighters were shot out of the air as soon as they came up to give combat. Air Force fighters and bombers had played an instrumental part in driving Japanese out of the Aleutian Islands. Illustrative of the challenges omnipresent in Alaska, only 35 aircraft were lost in combat compared to 150 operational accidents. It was the highest American combat-to-accidental loss ratio for any theater in World War II. Weather was the prime culprit. The Eleventh Air Force accounted for approximately 60 Japanese aircraft, one destroyer, one submarine and seven transport ships destroyed by air operations.

With the Aleutian Campaign completed, the Eleventh Air Force had the following units reassigned to other combat areas between 20 August and 1 September: the 21st Bombardment Squadron (Heavy), 36th Bombardment Squadron (Heavy), 73d Bombardment Squadron (Medium), 406th Bombardment Squadron (Medium) and the 407th Bombardment Squadron (Dive Bomber).

=== Operations against Japan ===
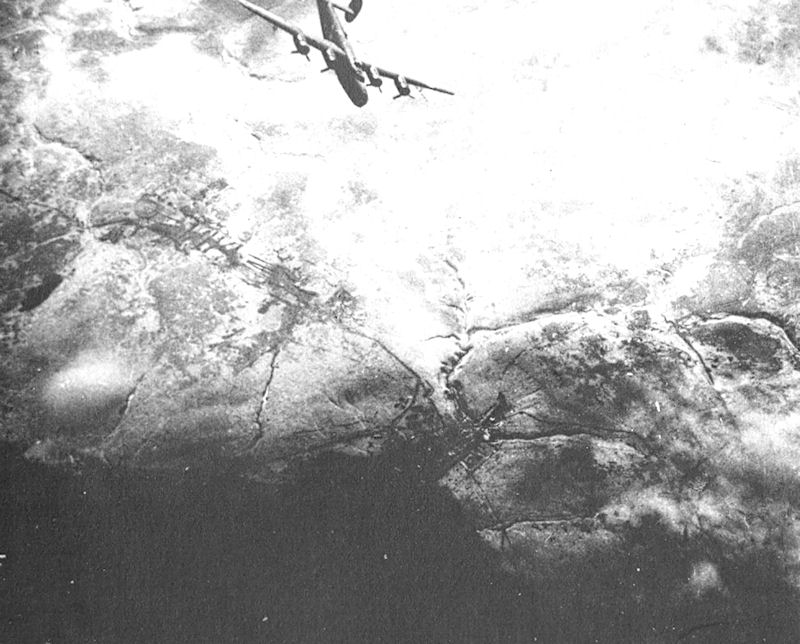
B-24 Liberators of the 404th Bombardment Squadron conducting a raid on Paramushiru Island, Japan, 18 August 1943

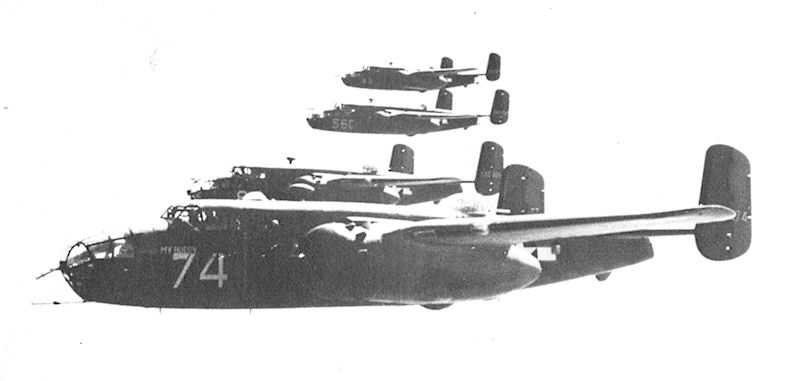
B-25s Mitchells of the 77th Bombardment Squadron performing an Anti-Shipping Patrol in the North Pacific

More than a month before the unopposed landing on Kiska, the Eleventh Air Force began a new phase of operations against the Japanese. On 10 July 1943, six Eleventh Air Force B-25 Mitchells made the long flight to Paramushiru Island in the Kuriles and made the first direct attack on the Japanese home islands since the famous Doolittle Raid in April 1942. From Alexai Point AAF on Attu, eight Mitchells of the 77th Bomb Squadron. (28th BG) struck Paramushiro bases principally. All returned safely.

A week later, B-24 Liberator heavy bombers from Attu bombed the Kuriles and secured pictures of the Japanese installations, the first pictures taken of northern Japan home-island defenses. The next Kurile raid, carried out on 11 August, was a diversionary raid prior to the landings on Kiska. On this mission, the first plane was lost over the Kuriles and Lieutenant James C. Pottenger and his crew made a forced landing in Russia.

These operations led to a joint mission on 11 September 1943, when Eleventh Air Force dispatched eight B-24 Liberators and 12 B-25s. However the Japanese were alert and reinforced their defenses. 74 crew members in three B-24s and seven B-25 failed to return. Twenty two men were killed in action, one taken prisoner and 51 interned in Kamchatka, Russia. It had proven that the Kurile Islands could be attacked, but new methods had to be devised as the raid lost Eleventh Air Force over half its offensive striking power. No more combat missions were flown in 1943.

Several changes took place following the occupation of Kiska. The Eleventh Air Force became a component of Task Force "Y", still under Navy jurisdiction. Vice Admiral Frank Jack Fletcher was named ComNorPac and Major General Davenport Johnson relieved General Butler as commander of the Eleventh Air Force. One of General Johnson's first acts was the establishment of the Eleventh Air Force Instrument flying school and the promotion of an intensive training program in navigation and instrument flying, as well as the accelerated development of radio and navigation aids in the Aleutian Islands. Because of the tremendous advances brought about by intensive instrument training and the increased aids to navigation and radio, planes that used to be grounded by weather, were now flying regular schedules. Troop Carrier Command and Air Transport Command planes were operating in the Aleutian Islands with airline regularity.

In November 1943 a second airfield, Casco Cove Army Airfield was constructed on Attu for long-range bombing operations. Eleventh Air Force carried out another bombing mission against northern Kurils on 5 February 1944, when it attacked with six B-24s from the 404th Bomb Sqdn. (28th BG) and 16 P-38s from the 54th Fighter Sqdn. (343d FG). March 1944 saw Eleventh Air Force bombers over the Kuriles on daylight armed reconnaissance missions. Not many, but a sufficient number to convince the Japanese that there were aircraft in the Aleutian Islands and that the Kuriles were in constant danger of air attack. During the crucial period, while other United States forces were advancing in the South Pacific, the Japanese were forced to keep much-needed aircraft, in the Kuriles and Hokkaido as defense against possible attack from the North.

Operations against Northern Japan became the new mission of the Eleventh Air Force, and it was being successfully carried out. Except for July 1944, when the weather was especially bad, each month of 1944 showed a steady increase in operations against the Kuriles. Each month's record showed planes turned back short of their targets, weather again protecting the Japanese. Often, too, B-24 Liberator bomb loads were dropped through the undercast by aid of the newly installed radar bombing equipment, a far cry from the timed runs made on the Kiska main camp area using the Kiska volcano as an initial point when the target was closed in. The record month, June 1945, for the Eleventh Air Force showed a record number of tons of bombs dropped.

The B-25 Mitchell medium bombers, too, were playing their part in operations against the Kuriles. They had been kept on shipping alert since the abortive 11 September raid, but in May, two planes on a gasoline consumption test west of Attu, discovered and sank two armed Japanese trawlers. From that time on, the Mitchells, made sweeps against shipping when weather permitted, and by fall were bombing land targets in the Kuriles.

=== Air Transport Command operations ===
Although Eleventh Air Force was engaged in combat during the Aleutian Campaign, the command also supported the Lend-Lease transport of aircraft though Alaska to the Soviet Union by Air Transport Command beginning in September 1942. Lend-Lease aircraft were ferried from Great Falls Army Air Base, Montana to Ladd Field by the 7th Ferrying Group (Later Alaskan Wing), ATC. The United States manufactured aircraft were turned over to Red Air Force pilots at Ladd Field, and from there the Soviet pilots would fly to Marks Army Airfield, near Nome as a final refueling and maintenance stop on-route to Uel'kal', Siberia. From Siberia, the aircraft were flown westward across the Soviet Union (Uelkal-Krasnoyarsk route) to the combat areas in Russia for use against Nazi forces. Eleventh Air Force aircraft were also ferried up the NWSR, with the aircraft being flown to Elmendorf from RCAF Station Whitehorse. More than 8,000 airplanes were delivered over the route. Most were Bell Airacobras and Kingcobras, along with A-20s, B-25s and C-47s. ATC personnel were based at Edmonton as well as other Canadian bases.

A lesser-known part of the aircraft ferrying mission for ATC pilots was search and rescue for Ferrying Command pilots and crews who were forced down in the remote wilderness. The ATC Alaska Wing was equipped with a number of single-engine C-64 "Norseman" light transports, which were equipped alternatively with pontoons, skis and wheels, depending the season. The C-64s were used to resupply stations along the Canadian pipeline as well as for search and rescue work.

ATC also developed two transport routes to Alaska during the war to support Eleventh Air Force. The first was from McChord Field, near Seattle, Washington north along the British Columbia coastline to Annette Island, then to Yakutat and into Elmendorf AFB. The second was developed to support the Aleutian Campaign and was built as American forces moved westward along the island chain. It started in Anchorage and went through Nannek Airfield then to Point Heiden, Cold Bay and along the Aleutian Islands until reaching Shemya and Attu Islands in 1944. These transport routes ferried personnel, along with high-value equipment and supplies that could not be shipped by normal cargo sealift. This eventually extended to Hokkaido, Japan after the end of the war, the route becoming part of the Great Circle Route from Japan to the United States. Much of the transport along the routes were an airline responsibility, with Northwest Airlines and Western Airlines operating the routes under contract.

=== Drawdown and redesignation, 1944–1945 ===
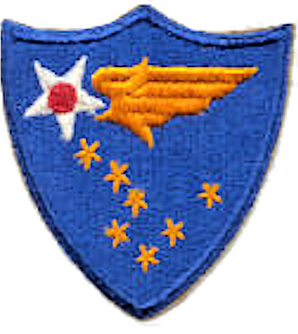
Army Air Forces Alaskan Air Command emblem

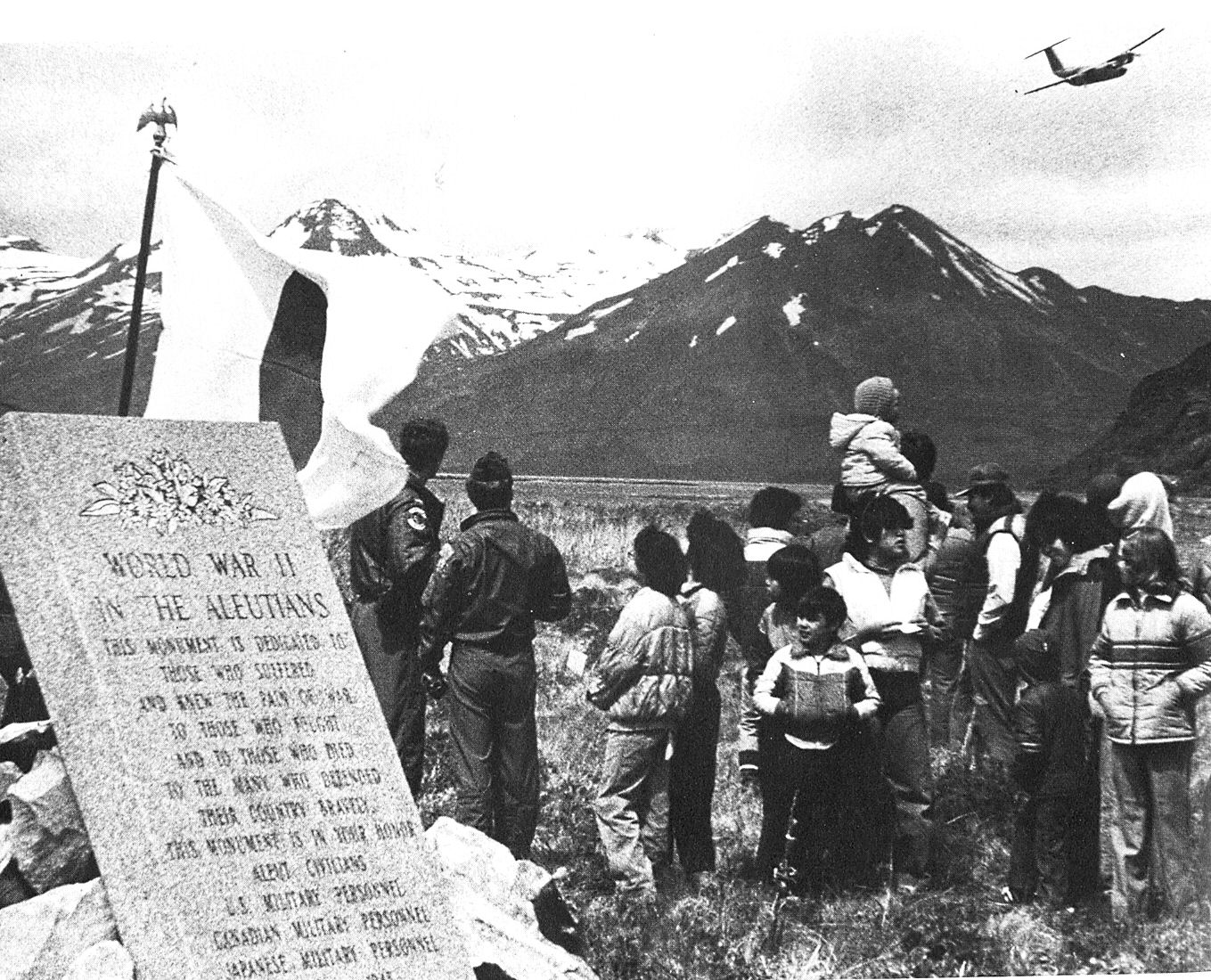
Dedication of the Aleutians Campaign Memorial on 5 June 1982 at Dutch Harbor, Alaska

1944 also saw a drastic reduction in the personnel of the Eleventh Air Force. Fort Glenn AAF and Fort Randall AAF were reduced to the status of gasoline stations for the Aleutian air transport routes, and were manned by small housekeeping units; Annette Island Landing Field and Yakutat Landing Field assigned as sub bases to Elmendorf Field. The XI Bomber Command and XI Fighter Command disbanded per General Order 9, Headquarters, Eleventh Air Force, 25 February 1944.

It took these actions due to the fact that only two bomber squadrons remained in the Eleventh Air Force and the need to reduce the number of personnel. The 28th Bombardment Group on Shemya and the 343d Fighter Group at Alexai Point AAF, Attu, assumed the responsibilities of the two commands. The 404th Bombardment Squadron was responsible for conducting night reconnaissance missions over the Kuriles and flying a daily weather reconnaissance flights. The 77th Bombardment Squadron was held in readiness to repel a seaborne invasion and the fighter squadrons provided air defense. Air Corps supply and fourth echelon maintenance was carried on at the Alaska Air Depot at Elmendorf, and the normal paper-work, customarily handled by a Service command, devolved upon the Eleventh Air Force Headquarters.

Eleventh Air Force, sent between 24 August and 4 September 1945 two B-24 Liberators of the 28th BG flew reconnaissance overflights over the North Kuril Islands to take photos of the Soviet occupation in the area. Soviet fighters intercepted and forced them away a foretaste of the Cold War that lay ahead.

Americans planners had briefly contemplated an invasion of northern Japan from the Aleutian Islands during fall of 1943, but rejected that idea as too risky and impractical. They considered the use of Boeing B-29 Superfortresses, on Amchitka and Shemya Bases, but rejected that idea too. U.S. military maintained interest in these plans when they ordered the expansion of bases in the western Aleutian Islands, and major construction began on Shemya for a possible invasion of Japan via the Northern route in 1945.

The real nature of the Aleutian Islands the value of the Eleventh Air Force to America was known but not confirmed until 3 September 1945. On that day, a C-54 piloted by Major G. E. Cain, filed a flight plan at Atsugi Airdrome, near Tokyo, Honshū, Japan. Twelve hours later, he landed at Adak, refueled and took off for Seattle. He landed in Washington after 31 hours of flying time, with the first motion pictures of the Japanese surrender the previous day.

The Aleutian Islands, on the Great Circle route from North America to the Orient may not have fulfilled their hope of becoming the "Northern Highway to Victory," but they were established as an air transport route, vital during the early years of the Cold War before long-distance air transports were developed.

With the end of the war, many of the small air bases in the Aleutian Islands closed permanently, and postwar emphasis turned to training. Air Transport Command transferred Ladd Field to the Eleventh Air Force on 1 November. On 15 December 1945, The Army reorganized its organization in Alaska. Eleventh Air Force, which was under the jurisdiction of the Army Western Defense Command, headquartered at the Presidio of San Francisco since its establishment in 1941, was transferred to the jurisdiction of the United States Army Air Forces.

Under the USAAF, it was re-designated as Alaskan Air Command' on 18 December 1945, without any change in headquarters location. Alaskan Air Command was established at the same Major Command echelon as the other overseas combat commands, the United States Air Forces in Europe, Far East Air Forces and Caribbean Air Command, with its mission being the air defense of the Territory of Alaska.

=== Eleventh Air Force in Pennsylvania 1946–1948 ===
Six months after Eleventh Air Force had been redesignated in Alaska, another headquarters, also named Eleventh Air Force, was established on 13 May 1946 and activated at Olmsted Field, Pennsylvania, on 13 June 1946. This new organization was assigned to Air Defense Command.

Major General Thomas J. Hanley, Jr. took command, and a cadre of enlisted personnel arrived at Olmsted on 19 June 1946. The headquarters was relocated to Harrisburg, Pennsylvania on 9 August 1946, base units were assigned and training commenced for reserve and National Guard units in Indiana, Ohio and Pennsylvania. Training continued until the unit was inactivated on 1 July 1948. This organization was to have been activated on 1 July 1962 at Travis Air Force Base under Military Air Transport Service, but that action was revoked three days before it became effective. This unit is not related to the current Eleventh Air Force.

=== Post-Cold War ===
PACAF emblem

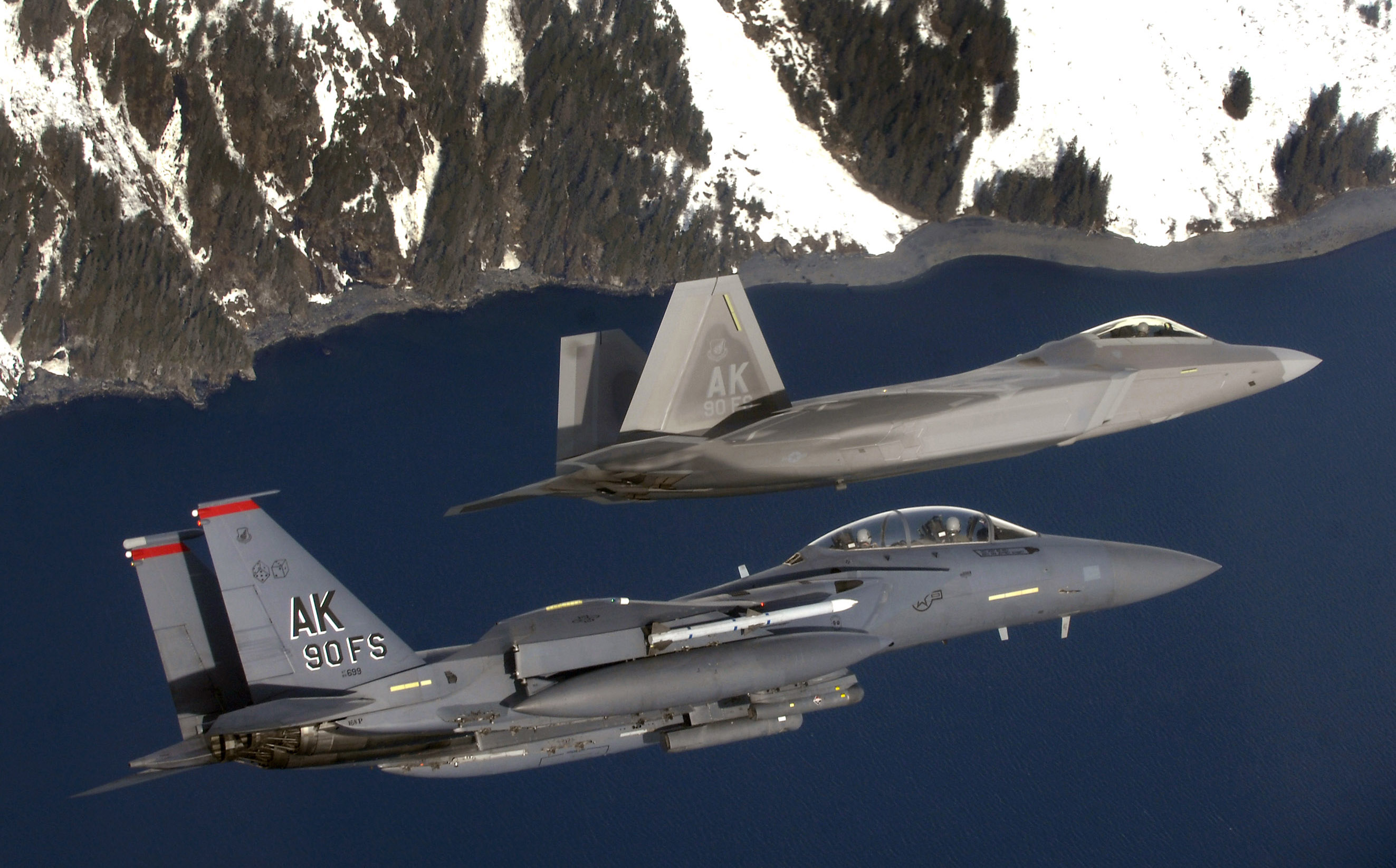
An F-15E Strike Eagle and an F-22 Raptor fly over the coast of Prince William Sound, Alaska.

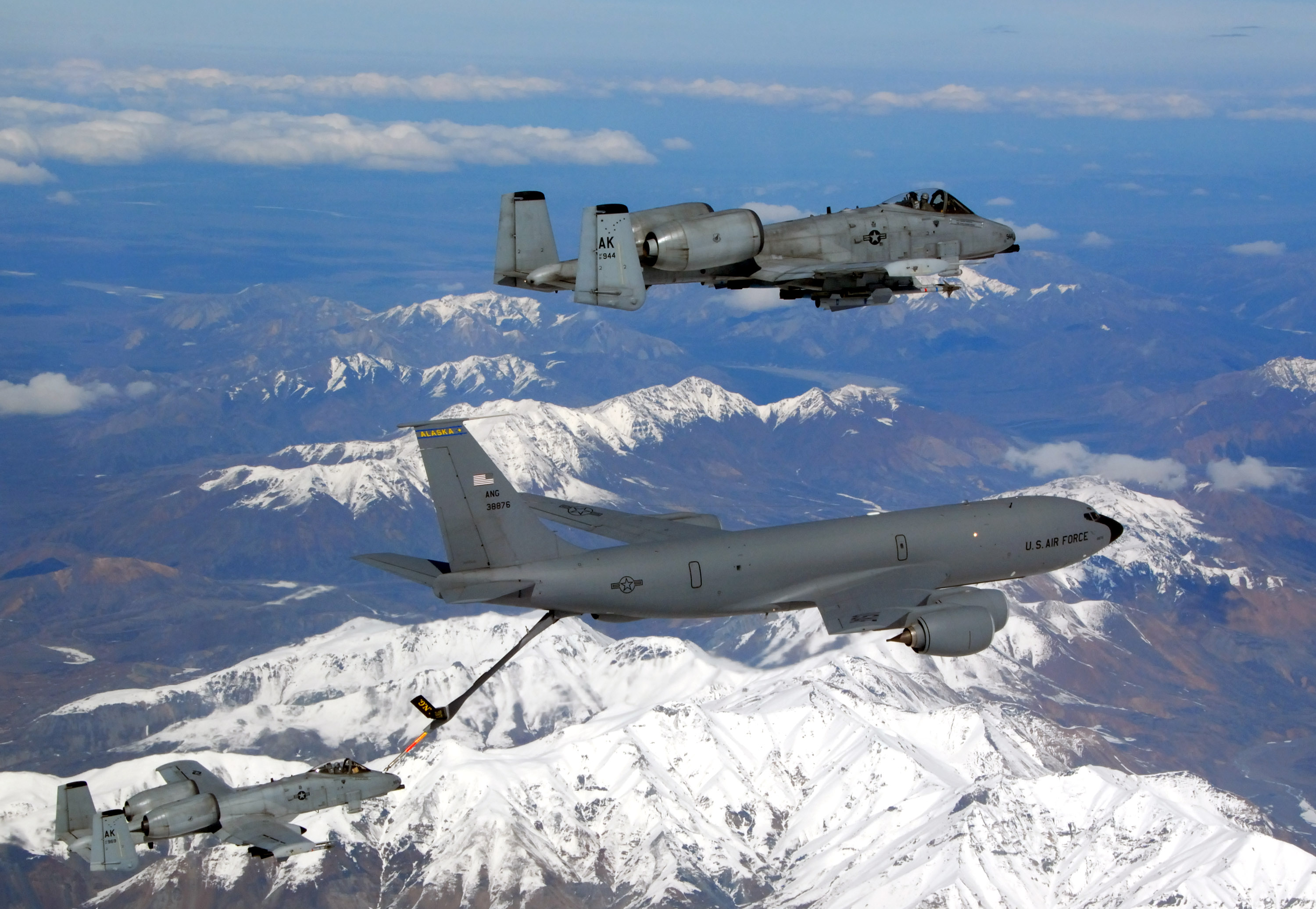
A KC-135 Stratotanker from the Alaska Air National Guard's 168th Air Refueling Wing flies in formation with two A-10 Thunderbolt IIs from the 355th Fighter Squadron over Alaska.

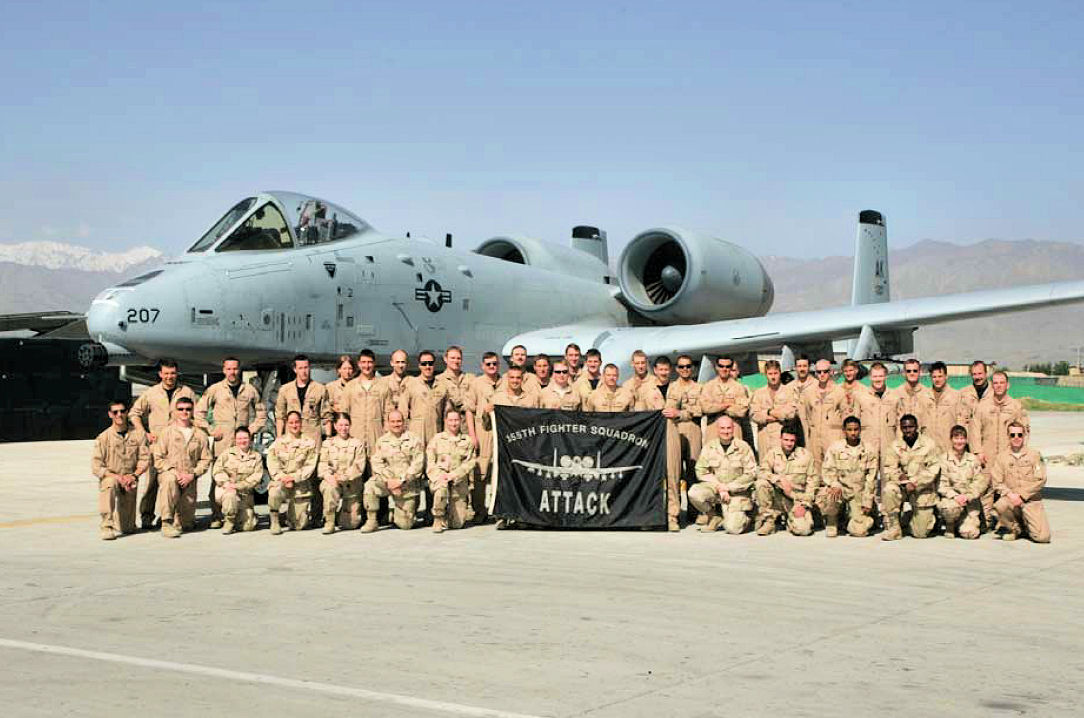
The Eielson 355th FS deployed to Bagram AB in 2006 as part of Operation Enduring Freedom.

With the activation of the Alaskan Command in 1989, the next logical step was to place its air component (AAC) under the Pacific Air Forces. By reorganizing AAC into a Numbered Air Force (NAF), the Air Force was able to reduce its administrative manpower requirements during a period of massive Air Force strength reductions. On 9 August 1990, the Alaskan Air Command was redesignated the 11th Air Force once again and assigned as a NAF under United States Pacific Air Forces. The new organization was allotted the lineage of the previous Eleventh Air Force that had served in Alaska.

The early 1990s was a period of mission changes and force modernization. The 11th Air Force was reorganized as an objective Numbered Air Force during 1992–1993 and its headquarters reduced to only 100 authorizations. Its major units also changed. At Elmendorf AFB the 21st Tactical Fighter Wing was inactivated and was replaced by the 3rd Wing transferred from Clark Air Base in December 1991 due to the destruction of Clark AB by the Mount Pinatubo eruption. The F-15E Strike Eagle-equipped 90th Fighter Squadron was added as were the 517th Airlift Squadron (C-130Hs and C-12Fs) and the 962d Airborne Air Control Squadron (E-3B).

There were also significant changes at Eielson AFB, when on 1 September 1992, Strategic Air Command inactivated the 6th Strategic Reconnaissance Wing, assigned there in 1967. The 343d Composite Wing became the host unit. The Fairchild Republic A-10 Thunderbolt II assigned to the 18th Fighter Squadron were replaced with General Dynamics F-16 Fighting Falcons in 1992 and an OA-10A squadron was activated. Eielson AFB became home of the Exercise Cope Thunder series, and the Alaskan range complex was greatly expanded and improved to accommodate not only Cope Thunder but other joint training requirements as well.

Finally, in keeping with Air Force Chief of Staff guidance to retain the most illustrious units, the 343rd Wing, a veteran of the Aleutian Campaign, was inactivated in August 1993. The 354th Fighter Wing was activated in its place.

Other changes during the period included upgrading the 11th Tactical Air Control Group to the 11th Air Control Wing (11 ACW) at Eareckson AS in January 1992. During yet another reorganization, the wing was inactivated 1 July 1994 with the closure of the station. It was replaced by "..two groups organized under the 11 AF, the 611th Air Operations Group and 611th Air Logistics Group, later changed to the 611th Air Support Group."

Eleventh Air Force also accomplished the daunting drawdown of the forward operating bases at Galena Airport, King Salmon Airport and Eareckson Air Force Station (Shemya Island), in a two-year period of time, 1993–1995, reflecting cost savings derived from the end of the Cold War. The stations remain in a standby status, their facilities being maintained by civilian contractors.

The mission of the Eleventh Air Force moved from statically defending Alaska against a bomber threat to committing its forces to worldwide deployment. The shift from a Major Command to an Objective Numbered Air Force was among the most drastic reorganizations undertaken anywhere in the Air Force.

Air Force personnel in Alaska were also integrated into the Air and Space Expeditionary Force deployment cycles, from the program's formal launch in 1998. In 2001–2002, the 18th Fighter Squadron deployed to Al Jaber, AB, Kuwait to take part in Operation Southern Watch, Operation Enduring Freedom, and to provide close air support to Operation Anaconda. In 2004, The 355th Fighter Squadron deployed to Bagram AB, Afghanistan, to provide air support to ground troops in the War in Afghanistan (2001–2021).

The Secretary of Defense released the proposed 2005 Base Realignment And Closure recommendations and Eielson AFB was on the list. The original recommendations called for Eielson to be drawn down to a warm status...nearly to the point of closure. However, the final decision came later in the year and it called for the departure of all the A-10s. Shortly thereafter, the 18 FS learned that they would be converting to F-16 Aggressors over the next few years. In 2007, the last three A-10 aircraft departed Eielson

==== Alaskan NORAD Region ====
see Pacific Air Forces Regional Support Center for a list of the AN/FPS-117 radar sites.
see North Warning System for the former DEW Line sites in Alaska

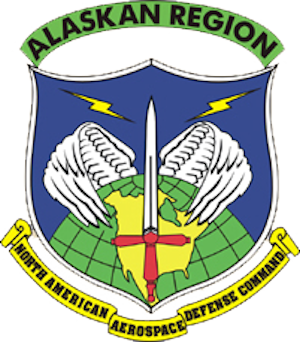
Emblem of the Alaskan NORAD Region

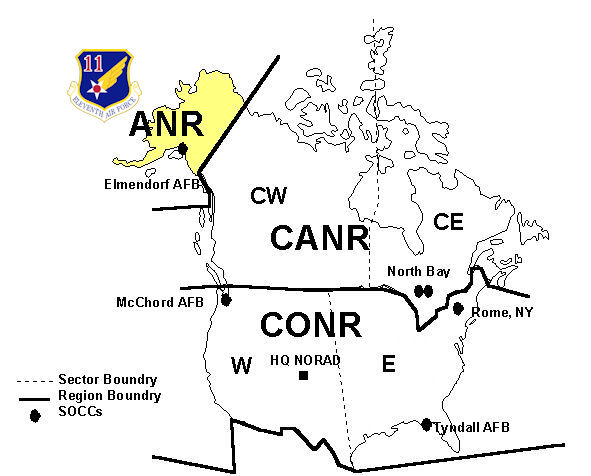
Alaska NORAD Region

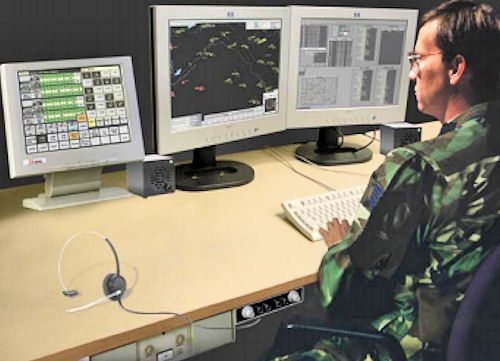
Battle Control System – Fixed (BCS-F) display.

The responsibilities for aerospace warning and aerospace control for North America are assigned to NORAD through the binational NORAD agreement. The Alaskan NORAD Region (ANR) is one of three NORAD regions responsible for the execution of the aerospace warning and aerospace control missions. ANR conducts these missions 24 hours a day, seven days a week.

Eleventh Air Force is the United States Air Force component of ANR. Coordinating with the Canadian Forces Air Command, Both 11th AF and the Canadian Forces provide active duty forces to the 611th Air and Space Operations Center. The 176th Air Control Squadron, an Alaska Air National Guard unit, provides manning for the Alaskan Air Defense Sector to maintain continuous surveillance of Alaskan airspace with Alaskan Radar System long and short-range radars.

The appearance of a strategic cruise missile threat once again prompted a buildup of air defense capabilities. The Alaska NORAD Region Air Operations Center (AK RAOC), operated by U.S. and Canadian personnel, became operational in 1983 at Elmendorf AFB. It receives and analyses surveillance radar data from the sites in the Alaska Radar System (ARS) to determine range, direction altitude speed and whether or not the objects are friendly or hostile.

The Alaska RAOC enjoins state-of-the-art air defense systems and cutting-edge computer technology to significantly increase surveillance and identification capabilities, and better protect the nation's airways from intrusion and attack. It is fully integrated with the Boeing E-3 Sentry Airborne early warning and control (AEW&C) system. The Battle Control System-Fixed (BCS-F) fuses data from airborne, ground and naval elements and civil air traffic sensors into an integrated air defence and sovereignty picture. This allows commanders to monitor the airspace above, beyond and within U.S. and Canadian borders, providing a major component for homeland defense. It also incorporates a newly developed situational awareness system that gives ANR unprecedented tools and technology to assist state and local responders in dealing with natural disasters.

The ARS consists of minimally attended AN/FPS-117 radar sites which were established between 1984 and 1985 at the former manned surveillance and Ground Control Intercept sites of Alaskan Air Command, first activated in the 1950s. Elements of the 1985 North American Air Defense Modernization program followed. Flexible and graduated alert concepts were introduced in the 1990s.

The ANR provides an ongoing capability to detect, validate, and warn of any aircraft and/or cruise missile threat in its area of operations that could threaten North American security. By maintaining surveillance of Northwest Canadian and U.S. airspace, ANR is able to determine what goes on in and near North American airspace 24 hours a day, seven days a week. Aerospace control requires capabilities to intercept, shadow, escort, divert, direct landings, and if necessary, use force utilizing interceptors and other means up to and including the destruction of airborne objects.

== Lineage ==
- Established as Air Force, Alaska Defense Command, 17 October 1941

General Order 51: HQ, Alaska Defense Command

- Established as Alaskan Air Force* on 28 December 1941

War Department Letter: Activation of Air Corps Unit, AG 320.2

Activated on 15 January 1942

General Order 3, HQ Alaskan Defense Command

Redesignated 11th Air Force on 5 February 1942
Redesignated Eleventh Air Force on 18 September 1942
Redesignated Alaskan Air Command on 18 December 1945

Assumed Major Command Status 18 December 1945

Redesignated Eleventh Air Force on 9 August 1990

Headquarters Pacific Air Forces Special Order GA-44, 1 August 1990
Became subordinate organization to Pacific Air Forces, 9 August 1990

- Under authority from Western Defense Command, the Alaska Defense Command replaced the Air Field Forces, Alaskan Defense Command, with the Air Force, Alaskan Defense Command, on 17 October 1941. Neither the Air Field Forces nor the Air Force, Alaskan Defense Command, were legitimate War Department establishments and must be classified in the same category as provisional units, although the term "provisional" was never used in connection with them.

The United States Department of War activated the Alaskan Air Force to manage the buildup of the Army Air Forces in Alaska and replacing the Air Force, Alaskan Defense Command.

== Assignments ==
- Alaska Defense Command, 17 October 1941
- Western Defense Command, 15 December 1941 – 18 December 1945
- Pacific Air Forces, 9 August 1990 – present

== Airbases ==
The formation's headquarters was located at Elmendorf Airfield, from 15 January 1942; then Davis Army Airfield, August 1943 – 18 December 1945, and, after being reformed as Eleventh Air Force, at Elmendorf Air Force Base from 9 August 1990 onwards.

=== World War II airfields ===
==== Combat airfields ====
- Davis Army Airfield, 51°52′40″N 176°38′33″W

Adak Island, Aleutian Islands, 1942–1945
Transferred to Alaskan Air Command; Became Davis Air Force Base; Transferred to Department of the Navy, 1949 as Naval Air Station Adak

- Amchitka Army Airfield, 51°22′37″N 179°15′23″E

Amchitka Island, Aleutian Islands, 1943–1945
Transferred to Alaskan Air Command; Became Amchitka Air Force Base; Closed 1948, now abandoned

- Alexai Point Army Airfield, 52°48′51″N 173°17′51″E

Attu Island, Aleutian Islands, 1943–1945, Closed 1945, now abandoned

- Elmendorf Field, 61°15′00″N 149°48′00″W

Anchorage, Alaska Territory, 1940–1945
Transferred to Alaskan Air Command, Became Elmendorf Air Force Base.

- Fort Glenn Army Airfield, 53°22′39″N 167°53′31″W

Umnak Island, Aleutian Islands, Opened 1 May 1942, closed 1945. Now abandoned

- Fort Morrow Army Airfield, 56°57′24″N 158°38′18″W

Kodiak Island, Alaska Territory, 1941–1945, Closed 1945, now Port Heiden Airport

- Fort Randall Army Airfield, 55°11′56″N 162°43′15″W

Cold Bay, Alaska Territory, Opened 1 April 1945
Transferred to Alaskan Air Command, 1945. Became Thornbrough Air Force Base, Closed 1950

- Shemya Army Airfield, 52°42′44″N 174°06′43″E

Shemya Island, Aleutian Islands, 1943–1945
Transferred to Alaskan Air Command, Became Shemya Air Force Base.

==== Support/Transferred airfields ====
- Annette Island Army Airfield, 55°02′13″N 131°34′21″W

Annette Island, Alexander Archipelago
Built 1941, opened 1 March 1942. AAF/Civil joint-use airport used as refueling/servicing of transport aircraft between Washington State and Elmendorf. Closed 1945 and turned over to War Assets Administration for disposition, 1946. Jurisdiction transferred to private ownership in 1947 and now Annette Island Airport.

- Todd Army Airfield, 60°46′29″N 161°43′24″W

Bethel, Alaska Territory
Construction began 21 September 1941, activated 4 July 1942; a.k.a. Bethel Air Base; Used by Air Transport Command as auxiliary airfield for Lend-Lease aircraft being flown to Siberia; Transferred to Eleventh Air Force, then to Alaskan Air Command, 1945; became joint-use Bethel Airport, used for construction of AC&W Bethel Air Force Station in the mid-1950s. Full jurisdiction turned over to Alaska Government 1958, now a civil airport.

- Big Delta Army Airfield, 63°59′42″N 145°43′12″W

Fairbanks, Alaska Territory
Built 1942 for Air Transport Command; Host unit was 1465th AAFBU. Alaskan Division, ATC. Was used on Northwest Staging Route ferrying Lend-Lease aircraft; Also used by Eleventh Air Force for staging and emergency use. Transferred to Eleventh Air Force, then to Alaskan Air Command, 1945; transferred to United States Army 1948, now Fort Greely

- Cordova Airport, 60°29′31″N 145°28′32″W

Cordova, Alaska Territory
Construction began 22 June 1941, activated 1 April 1941. Became AAF/Civil joint-use airport used as refueling/servicing of transport aircraft between Washington State and Elmendorf. Closed 1945 and turned over to War Assets Administration for disposition, 1946. Jurisdiction transferred to private ownership in 1949 and now Cordova Municipal Airport.

- Gakona Landing Strip, 62°18′06″N 145°17′29″W

Gakona, Alaska Territory
Emergency 3,000 ft rolled gravel landing strip bulldozed in 1943, located adjacent to Gakona, Alaska, aligned 03/21. Abandoned after the war, now the right-of-way is a part of Alaska Highway 1.

- Galena Airport, 64°44′10″N 156°56′04″W

Galena, Alaska Territory
Constructed 1942 by Air Transport Command, Host unit was 1468th AAFBU. Alaskan Division, ATC. Was used as refueling/servicing airfield for transfer of Lend-Lease aircraft to Siberia; Also used by Eleventh Air Force for staging and emergency use. Transferred to Eleventh Air Force, then to Alaskan Air Command, 1945

- Gambell Army Airfield, 63°46′04″N 171°43′59″W

Gambell, St. Lawrence Island
Constructed 1943 by Air Transport Command, used as refueling/servicing airfield for transfer of Lend-Lease aircraft to Siberia; Transferred to Eleventh Air Force, then to Alaskan Air Command, 1945 and closed, turned over to War Assets Administration for disposition, 1946. Jurisdiction transferred to private ownership in 1950 and now Gambell Airport.

- Juneau Airport, 58°21′20″N 134°34′29″W

Juneau, Alaska Territory
Opened on 1 July 1941 as a civil airport. Used as a military refueling/servicing stop for transport aircraft between Washington State and Elmendorf.

- Kiska Army Airfield, 51°58′19″N 177°31′12″W

Kiska Island, Aleutian Islands
Captured Japanese airfield under construction at time of liberation, 1943. Completed by AAF Engineers and used as auxiliary transport airfield in Aleutian Islands. Closed 1945 and abandoned.

- Ladd Army Airfield, 64°50′15″N 147°36′51″W

Fairbanks, Alaska Territory
Constructed 1939, prewar mission was cold weather testing of aircraft and equipment; became Air Transport Command airfield in 1942, Host unit was 1466th AAFBU. Alaskan Division, ATC. Was main transfer point for Northwest Staging Route Lend-Lease aircraft from United States ATC pilots to Soviet Red Air Force pilots; aircraft then flown to Siberia after transfer. Transferred to Eleventh Air Force, then to Alaskan Air Command, 1945

- McGrath Army Airbase, 62°57′10″N 155°36′18″W

Constructed 1941 by CAA a civil airport. Used as a sub-base of Ladd Army Airbase. Used by Air Transport Command as auxiliary airfield for Lend-Lease aircraft being flown to Siberia; Transferred to Eleventh Air Force, then to Alaskan Air Command, 1945; Full jurisdiction turned over to Alaska Government 1947, now a civil airport. Used as a staging facility for construction of AC&W Tatalina Air Force Station in the mid-1950s.

- Marks Army Airfield, 64°30′44″N 165°26′43″W

Nome, Alaska Territory
Constructed 1942, opened 1 July. Used by Air Transport Command as refueling/servicing airfield for Lend-Lease aircraft being flown to Siberia by Soviet Red Air Force pilots. Host unit was 1469th AAFBU. Alaskan Division, ATC. Renamed Marks Army Airfield, 1942. Transferred to Eleventh Air Force, then to Alaskan Air Command, 1945

- Mile 26 Field, 64°39′55″N 147°06′02″W

Moose Creek, Alaska Territory
Constructed 1943 by Air Transport Command; activated on 20 September as Station No. 4, Alaskan Wing, was auxiliary to Ladd Army Airfield for Northwest Staging Route Lend-Lease aircraft. Transferred to Eleventh Air Force, then to Alaskan Air Command, 1945.

- Moses Point Airstrip, 64°41′53″N 162°03′26″W

Elim, Alaska Territory.
Constructed 1943 as auxiliary landing strip for Marks AAF; Used as servicing airfield for Lend-Lease aircraft being flown to Siberia by Soviet Red Air Force pilots. Transferred to Eleventh Air Force, then to Alaskan Air Command, 1945 and closed, turned over to War Assets Administration for disposition, 1946. Jurisdiction transferred to private ownership in 1947 and now civil airport.

- Naknek Army Airfield, 58°40′36″N 156°38′57″W

King Salmon, Alaska Territory
Activated 1 July 1942 by Air Transport Command. Was transport and maintenance airfield for ATC aircraft servicing Alaska airfields; also provided maintenance for transient aircraft in Alaska. Transferred to Eleventh Air Force, then to Alaskan Air Command in 1945. Became King Salmon Air Force Base.

- Northway Army Airfield, 62°57′40″N 141°55′50″W

Northway, Alaska Territory.
Constructed 1943 by Air Transport Command; Host unit was 1463d AAFBU. Alaskan Division, ATC. Mission was servicing Northwest Staging Route Lend-Lease aircraft from United States. Also used by Eleventh Air Force for staging and emergency use. Transferred to Eleventh Air Force, then to Alaskan Air Command, 1945 and closed, turned over to War Assets Administration for disposition, 1946. Jurisdiction transferred to private ownership in 1947 and now Northway Airport.

- Ogliuga Island Army Airfield, 51°36′22″N 178°39′23″W

Was forward airfield constructed on Ogliuga Island. Operational between 1943 and 1945, used during Aleutian Campaign between Kiska and Adak. The site included an emergency landing field, parking area, and living quarters. Additional facilities were established at this site, including aircraft warning, airway radio communication, and a weather reporting station. No permanent units assigned, abandoned. Reported hazardous munitions still remaining on island.

- Tanacross Air Base, 63°22′25″N 143°20′00″W

Tanacross, Alaska Territory
Constructed 1943, activated 20 September by Air Transport Command as Station No. 16, Alaskan Wing, later 1464th AAFBU. Alaskan Division, ATC. Was auxiliary to Ladd Army Airfield for Northwest Staging Route Lend-Lease aircraft. Designated Tanacross Air Base, July 1944. Mission was servicing Northwest Staging Route Lend-Lease aircraft from United States. Transferred to Eleventh Air Force, then to Alaskan Air Command, 1945 and closed, turned over to War Assets Administration for disposition, 1946. Jurisdiction transferred to private ownership in 1947 and now Tanacross Airport.

- Yakutat Army Airfield, 59°30′31″N 139°39′35″W

Yakutat City and Borough, Alaska Territory
Constructed 1941 as landing field for transport aircraft between Washington State and Elmendorf; activated on 1 March 1942; closed 1945, turned over to War Assets Administration for disposition, 1946. Jurisdiction transferred to private ownership in 1949 and now Yakutat Airport.

== Components ==
=== During World War II ===
==== Commands ====
- XI Bomber Command

Constituted 4 March 1943
Activated on 19 March 1943
Inactivated on 31 March 1944

Longview Army Airfield, Adak, 19 March 1941
Amchitka Army Airfield, 24 June 1943
Davis Army Airfield, Adak, 4 September 1943
Shemya Army Airfield, 3–31 March 1944

- XI Fighter Command

Constituted as XI Interceptor Command, 8 March 1942
Activated on 15 March 1942
Re-designated as XI Fighter Command, 1 May 1942
Inactivated on 31 March 1944

Elmendorf Army Airfield, 15 March 1942
Davis Army Airfield, Adak, 12 September 1943 – 31 March 1944

- XI Air Force Service Command: 11 August 1942 – 25 October 1944.

==== Groups ====
- 28th Composite (later Bombardment) Group

Elmendorf Army Airfield, 13 February 1941
Davis Army Airfield, Adak, 14 March 1943
Shemya Army Airfield, 26 February 1944 – 20 October 1945

- 343d Fighter Group

Elmendorf Army Airfield, 11 September 1942
Fort Glenn Army Airfield, 1 September 1942
Elmendorf Army Airfield, 3 December 1942
Davis Army Airfield, Adak, 1 March 1943
Alexai Point Army Airfield, Attu, 22 January 1944
Shemya Army Airfield, 5 October 1945 – 15 August 1946

- 337th Service Group, Elmendorf Field, AK, 1 August 1942-

==== Squadrons ====
- 36th Bombardment Squadron (Medium, later Heavy) (B-18, B-17E)

28th Composite Group, 1 February 1940 – 19 October 1943

Elmendorf Army Airfield, 31 March 1941
Big Delta Army Airfield (ATC), Fort Greeley, 9 February 1942 – 28 May 1943

Operated from: Fort Glenn, Fort Morrow, Adak, Amchitka AAF, 4 June 1942 – 1 May 1943

Amchitka Army Airfield, 4 May 13 September 1943

Operated from: Davis Army Airfield, Adak, 1 June – 4 August 1943

- 404th Bombardment Squadron (Heavy) (B-24)

28th Composite Group

Air echelon attached, 12 July 1942
Squadron assigned 21 September 1942

Eleventh Air Force, 20 October 1945 – 5 January 1947

Barksdale Field, Louisiana

Deployed to: Ladd Army Airfield (ATC), Fairbanks, 12 July 1942
Deployed to: Marks Army Airfield (ATC), Nome, 18–25 July 1942

Will Rogers Field, Oklahoma

Deployed to: Fort Glenn Army Airfield, Umnak, 24 August 1942

Fort Lewis, Washington, 30 August – 10 September 1942

Deployed to: Davis Army Airfield, Adak, 13 September 1942

Elmendorf Army Airfield, 21 September 1942
Davis Army Airfield, Adak, 22 May 1943

Operated from: Amchitka Army Airfield, 4 June 1943

Shemya Army Airfield, 26 February 1944 – 5 July 1947

- 73d Bombardment Squadron (Medium) (B-18, B-26, B-25)

28th Composite Group, 3 May 1941 – 6 October 1943

Elmendorf Army Airfield, 14 March 1941

Detachment operated from Fort Randall, Fort Glenn, Adak and Amchitka AAF, 1942, 1943

Fort Glenn Army Airfield, Umnak, April 1943
Amchitka Army Airfield, 1 June – 30 August 1943

- 77th Bombardment Squadron (Medium) (B-18, B-26, B-25)

28th Composite Group, 2 January 1942
Eleventh Air Force, 20 October – 5 November 1945

Elmendorf Army Airfield, 29 December 1942

Operated from: Fort Glenn Army Airfield, Umnak, 30 May 1942
Operated from: Davis Army Airfield, Adak, 20 May 1942

Davis Army Airfield, Adak, 12 December 1942

Operated from Alexai Point Army Airfield, Attu, 22 July 1943

Amchitka Army Airfield, 11 September 1943
Alexai Point Army Airfield, Attu, 11 February 1944 – 19 October 1945

- 406th Bombardment Squadron (Medium) (B-18, B-26, B-25)

41st Bombardment Group

Attached to 28th Composite Group, 1 June 1942 – 31 October 1943

Operated from: Elmendorf, Yakutat, Naknek, Fort Morrow AAF, June–November 1942
Elmendorf Army Airfield, November 1942 – October 1943

Operated from: Davis Army Airfield, Adak, 25 July – 13 August 1943

- 635th Bombardment Squadron (Dive) (A-24)

407th Bombardment Group

Drew Field, Florida

Operated from: Amchitka Army Airfield, 19 July – 15 August 1943

- 11th Fighter Squadron (P-40, P-38)

Provisional Interceptor Command, 2 January 1942
28th Composite Group, 2 February 1942
XI Fighter Command, 7 June 1942
343d Fighter Group, 11 September 1942 – 15 August 1946

Elmendorf Army Airfield, 29 December 1941
Detachment at: Amchitka Army Airfield, 27 March – 17 May 1943
Detachment at: Shemya Army Airfield, 11 August 1945 – 15 August 1946

- 18th Fighter Squadron (P-40, P-38)

28th Composite Group, 24 February 1941
XI Fighter Command, 7 June 1942
343d Fighter Group 11 September 1942 – 15 August 1946

Elmendorf Army Airfield, 21 February 1941
Big Delta Army Airfield, Fort Greeley, 18 April – 3 November 1942
Davis Army Airfield, Adak, 6 December 1942
Amchitka Army Airfield, 15 February 1943
Casco Cove Army Airfield, Attu, 28 March 1944
Elmendorf Army Airfield, 6 November 1945

- 344th Fighter Squadron (P-40, P-38)

343d Fighter Group, 10 October 1942 – 15 August 1946

Elmendorf Army Airfield, 10 October 1942

Detachment at: Fort Randall Army Airfield, 12 November 1942

Fort Randall Army Airfield, 25 December 1942
Fort Glenn Army Airfield, Umnak, 8 March 23 May 1943

Detachment at Amchitka Army Airfield, May–July 1943
Detachment at Alexai Point Army Airfield, Attu, 12 June – December 1943

Shemya Army Airfield, 25 June 1943 – 15 August 1946

- 54th Fighter Squadron (P-40, P-43, F-5, P-38)

55th Fighter Group

Attached to XI Fighter Command, 31 May – 11 September 1941

343d Fighter Group, 11 September 1942 – 21 March 1946

Elmendorf Army Airfield, 31 May – 24 August 1942

Detachment at: Fort Randall Army Airfield, 6 June – 31 July 1942
Detachment at: Fort Glenn Army Airfield, 6 June – 19 September 1942

Davis Army Airfield, Adak, 31 August 1942
Amchitka Army Airfield, 12 March 1943
Shemya Army Airfield, 18 October 1943
Casco Cove Army Airfield, Attu, 20 November 1943 – 8 March 1946

- 42d Fighter Squadron (P-39E)

Deployed from 54th Fighter Group

Fort Morrow Army Airfield, Kodiak, 12 June 1942
Davis Army Airfield, Adak, 10 September – 12 December 1942

- 56th Fighter Squadron (P-39)

Deployed from 54th Fighter Group, 20 June – 21 December 1942

Marks Army Airfield (ATC), Nome, 20 June – 20 October 1942
Elmendorf Army Airfield, 23 October – 21 December 1942

- 57th Fighter Squadron (P-39)

Deployed from 54th Fighter Group, 20 June – 1 December 1942

Elmendorf Army Airfield, 20 June – 30 September 1942
Fort Morrow Army Airfield, Kodiak, 30 September – 1 December 1942

- 42d Troop Carrier Squadron (C-47)

Eleventh Air Force, 2 May 1942

Attached to: IX Air Force Service Command (Provisional), 21 June – 8 August 1942

IX Air Force Service Command, 8 August 1942

Attached to: Troop Carrier Group (Provisional), 1 July 1943 – 6 March 1944

Elmendorf Army Airfield, 2 May 1942 – 18 February 1944

- 54th Troop Carrier Squadron (C-47)

XI Air Force Service Command, 15 November 1942
Eleventh Air Force, 10 October 1944 – 5 March 1949

Elmendorf Army Airfield, 15 November 1942 – 5 March 1949

=== Twenty-first century ===
- 3rd Wing
  The 3rd Wing is stationed at Joint Base Elmendorf–Richardson, Anchorage, Alaska. Its mission is to support and defend U.S. interests in the Asia-Pacific region and around the world by providing units that are ready for worldwide air power projection and a base that is capable of meeting PACOM's theater staging and throughput requirements.
- 354th Fighter Wing
  The 354th Fighter Wing is stationed at Eielson Air Force Base, Alaska. The wing's mission is to train and provide General Dynamics F-16 Fighting Falcon fighters and support forces to combatant commanders anytime, anyplace, in support of U.S. national security objectives. The wing also hosts Air Education and Training Command's Arctic Survival School.
- 36th Wing
  Located at Andersen Air Force Base, Guam. The 36th Wing has three major missions: Operate Andersen AFB via its subordinate 36th Mission Support and 36th Medical Groups; Provide power projection through an attached, rotational bomber force via its subordinate 36th Operations and 36th Maintenance Groups; and provide rapid air base opening and initial air base operation ability via its subordinate 36th Contingency Response Group.
- 611th Air and Space Operations Center
  Located at Joint Base Elmendorf–Richardson, the center consists of five squadrons and two numbered flights that develop plans, procedures and directives for the employment of Alaskan combat and support forces assigned to the 11th Air Force, PACAF and NORAD.
- 611th Air Support Group
  The 611th Air Support Group at Joint Base Elmendorf–Richardson consists of two squadrons that provides surveillance radars, Arctic infrastructure including airfields, communications and worldwide ready EAF warriors for homeland defense, decisive force projection, and aerospace command and control in Alaska.
- Missile Defense Flight or Command Representative for Missile Defense
  Serves as the focal point for all issues related to Ground-based Midcourse Defense in Alaska, in support of Alaska Command, Alaska NORAD Region, and 11 AF.
- 11th Air Force/Alaska NORAD Region (ANR) Logistics Flight
  Provides a core group of logisticians to support Air Force and NORAD air operations throughout the theater, including manning the ANR Battlestaff and establishing logistics readiness centers when necessary.

=== Alaska Air National Guard ===
If activated for federal service, the 11th Air Force gains two wings of the Alaska Air National Guard.

- 168th Air Refueling Wing
  The 168th Air Refueling Wing is stationed at Eielson Air Force Base, Alaska, and flies the Boeing KC-135R Stratotanker. The 168th also has taken over the missile defense mission at Clear Air Force Station with their 213th Space Warning Squadron.
- 176th Wing
  The 176th Wing operates from Joint Base Elmendorf–Richardson. The 176th is a multifaceted organization consisting of an airlift squadron, a complete pararescue package, as well as the 176th Air Control Squadron, which supports the Alaska NORAD Region with continuous operations and maintenance.

== List of commanders ==
No.	Commander		Term		
No.	Portrait	Name	Took office	Left office	Term length
1	Thomas G. McInerney	Lieutenant General; Thomas G. McInerney	9 August 1990	13 July 1992	1 year, 339 days
2	Joseph W. Ralston	Lieutenant General; Joseph W. Ralston	13 July 1992	29 June 1994	1 year, 351 days
3	Lawrence E. Boese	Lieutenant General; Lawrence E. Boese	29 June 1994	21 August 1996	2 years, 53 days
4	Patrick K. Gamble	Lieutenant General; Patrick K. Gamble	21 August 1996	18 December 1997	1 year, 119 days
5	David J. McCloud	Lieutenant General; David J. McCloud	18 December 1997	26 July 1998	220 days
-	Tommy F. Crawford	Brigadier General; Tommy F. Crawford; Acting	26 July 1998	3 October 1998	69 days
6	Thomas R. Case	Lieutenant General; Thomas R. Case	3 October 1998	26 September 2000	1 year, 359 days
7	Norton A. Schwartz	Lieutenant General; Norton A. Schwartz	26 September 2000	30 September 2002	2 years, 4 days
8	Carrol H. Chandler	Lieutenant General; Carrol H. Chandler	30 September 2002	11 October 2005	3 years, 11 days
9	Douglas M. Fraser	Lieutenant General; Douglas M. Fraser	11 October 2005	May 2008	~2 years, 203 days
10	Dana T. Atkins	Lieutenant General; Dana T. Atkins	May 2008	November 2011	~3 years, 184 days
11	Stephen L. Hoog	Lieutenant General; Stephen L. Hoog	November 2011	9 August 2013	~1 year, 281 days
12	Russell J. Handy	Lieutenant General; Russell J. Handy	9 August 2013	16 August 2016	3 years, 7 days
13	Kenneth S. Wilsbach	Lieutenant General; Kenneth S. Wilsbach	16 August 2016	24 August 2018	2 years, 8 days
14	Thomas A. Bussiere	Lieutenant General; Thomas A. Bussiere	24 August 2018	20 April 2020	1 year, 240 days
15	David A. Krumm	Lieutenant General; David A. Krumm	20 April 2020	11 August 2022	2 years, 113 days
16	David S. Nahom	Lieutenant General; David S. Nahom	11 August 2022	9 August 2024	1 year, 364 days
17	Case Cunningham	Lieutenant General; Case Cunningham	9 August 2024	15 October 2025	1 year, 67 days
18	Robert D. Davis	Lieutenant General; Robert D. Davis	15 October 2025	Incumbent	342 days

== See also ==
- Joint Task Force-Alaska
- Alaska World War II Army Airfields
- Report from the Aleutians 1943 film by John Houston about the daily lives of the servicemen at Adak Airfield.
