= 28th Operations Group =

US Air Force units

28th Operations Group

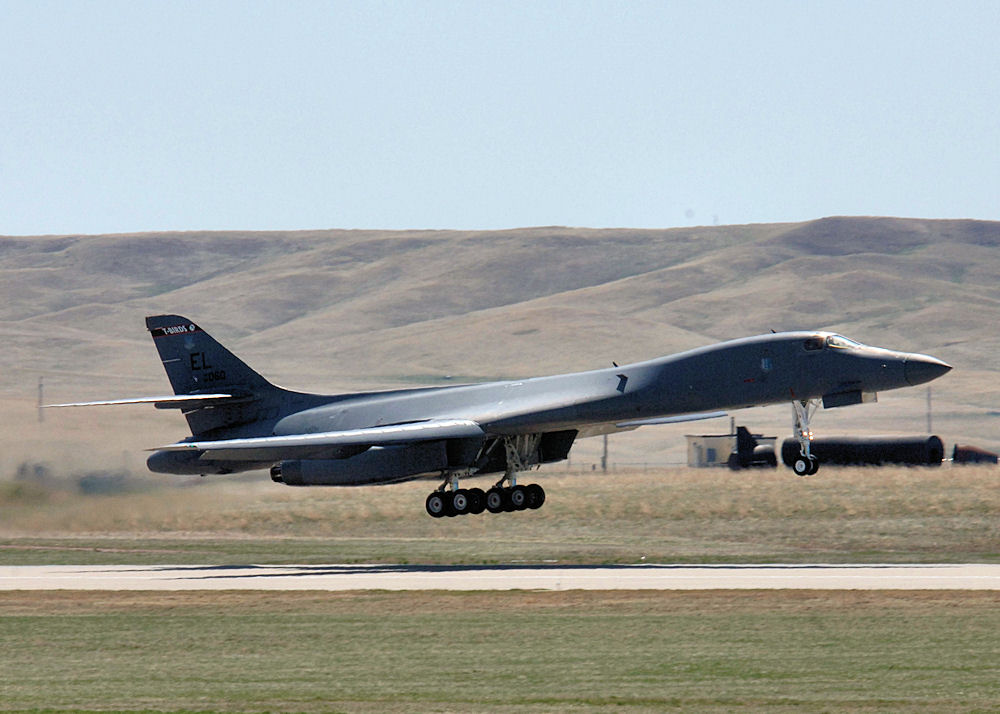
- Group Rockwell B-1B Lancer (Note: Aircraft is Rockwell B-1B Lancer Lot IV Serial 85-60 of the 34th Bomb Squadron.)
- Active: 1940–1945; 1946–1952; 1991–present
- Country: United States
- Branch: United States Air Force
- Role: Bomber
- Part of: Global Strike Command; Eighth Air Force; 28th Bomb Wing
- Decorations: Distinguished Unit Citation; Air Force Outstanding Unit Award with Combat "V" Device; Air Force Outstanding Unit Award
- Battle honours: Aleutian Campaign

Insignia
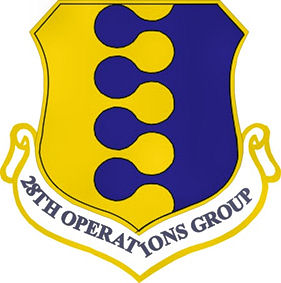
- 28th Operations Group emblem (Note: The group uses the 28th Wing emblem with the group designation on the scroll. Robertson, Factsheet, 28 Operations Group.)

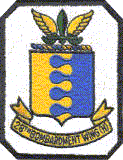
- Patch with 28th Composite Group emblem (approved 14 November 1941)

The 28th Operations Group is the flying component of the United States Air Force 28th Bomb Wing, stationed at Ellsworth Air Force Base, South Dakota.

The group controls two Rockwell B-1B Lancer bomb squadrons, and provides combat-ready aircrews to project global power anytime in support of the Combatant Commander's objectives.

The group carries the lineage and history of the World War II 28th Bombardment Group, which was one of the primary units assigned to Eleventh Air Force during the Aleutian Campaign. The group helped force the withdrawal of Japanese ships that attacked Dutch Harbor in June 1942, and flew missions against Kiska until the Japanese evacuated that island in August 1943.

In the postwar era, the 28th Bombardment Group was one of the first USAAF units assigned to the Strategic Air Command on 4 August 1946, prior to the establishment of the United States Air Force. The group being activated as a redesignation of the 449th Bombardment Group due to the Air Force's policy of retaining only low-numbered groups on active duty after the war. The group was inactivated in 1952 when the parent wing adopted the Tri-Deputate organization and assigned all of the group's squadrons directly to the wing.

Reactivated as the 28th Operations Group in 1991 when the 28th Bomb Wing adopted the USAF Objective organization plan.

== Units ==
- 28th Operations Support Squadron
- 34th Bomb Squadron EL – Red Tail Flash with Thunderbird emblem "T-Birds"
- 37th Bomb Squadron EL – Yellow and black Tiger striped Tail Flash

The 34th and the 37th Bomb Squadrons carry the legacy of the 1942 Doolittle Raiders. The raiders were drawn from the 95th, 34th, 37th Bombardment Squadrons and the 89th Reconnaissance Squadron of the 17th Bombardment Group.

== History ==
For related lineage and history, see 28th Bomb Wing

=== World War II ===
Organized in February 1940 after outbreak of World War II in Europe. Moved to Alaska one year later, where it trained for Arctic warfare and served to defend the incorporated territory after Japan bombed the neutral United States in Oahu, Hawaii on 7 December 1941.

The group helped force the withdrawal of Japanese ships that attacked Dutch Harbor in June 1942, flew missions against occupied Kiska until the Japanese evacuated that island in August 1943, bombed and strafed enemy shipping, harbor facilities, canneries, fisheries, and military installations in the Kurils, and flew photographic reconnaissance missions. Earned a Distinguished Unit Citation for attacks on the Kurils that caused Japan to divert some of her air power to that northern area, weakening Japanese opposition to Allied forces to the south, April 1944 – August 1945. Flew its last World War II bombing mission on 13 August 1945, but continued reconnaissance operations in the Kurils into September 1945.

Inactivated in October 1945, but activated a few months later in Nebraska. Received B-29 Superfortresses and personnel from inactivated 449th Air Expeditionary Group. Reassigned to Elmendorf Field, Alaska for six months of post-war arctic operations in Alaska.

=== Cold War ===
On 3 May 1947, the group and its subordinate units relocated to Rapid City Army Air Field (later Ellsworth AFB) and awaited the activation of the new headquarters to which they would soon be assigned: the 28th Bombardment Wing.

The 28th Bomb Wing was established on 28 July 1947 under the Hobson Plan, which was designed to streamline the peacetime forces after World War II. The wing existed only on paper until 15 August 1947 when SAC organized it under the 15th Air Force. Upon its activation, the wing included the 28 Bombardment Group (Heavy), 28th Airdrome Group (now Support Group), 28th Maintenance and Supply Group (Now Logistics Group), 28th Station Medical Group, and the 612th Army Air Forces Band.

On 12 July 1948, in its first of many name changes, SAC activated the organization as the 28th Bombardment Wing, Medium. Just one week later, the wing deployed the entire 28th Bombardment Group and its 77th, 717th, and 718th Bombardment Squadrons (BS) to England for a 90-day B-29 show-of-force mission during the Soviet blockade of Berlin. The wing flew the B-29 until 1950 and maintained proficiency in heavy global bombardment.

Shortly after additional runway improvements, in July 1949, the 28 BMW began conversion from B-29s to the RB-36 Peacemaker. In April 1950 the Air Staff reassigned the base from 15th Air Force to 8th Air Force. With the change in aircraft also came a modified mission: global strategic reconnaissance with bombardment as a secondary tasking. The wing's name changed again in April 1950, this time to the 28th Strategic Reconnaissance Wing, Heavy. Meanwhile, intermediate command assignments changed from the 15th to the 8th Air Force. In May 1951 the wing flew a record setting B-36 training mission lasting 41 hours without refueling. In June 1952, SAC inactivated the old 28th BG and assigned its squadrons directly under the 28 BW as part of the Tri-Deputate Organization. Seven B-36Bs were converted to RB-36D. Several RB-36D aircraft temporarily assigned to 91st Strategic Reconnaissance Squadron for duty during Korean War.

=== Reactivation ===
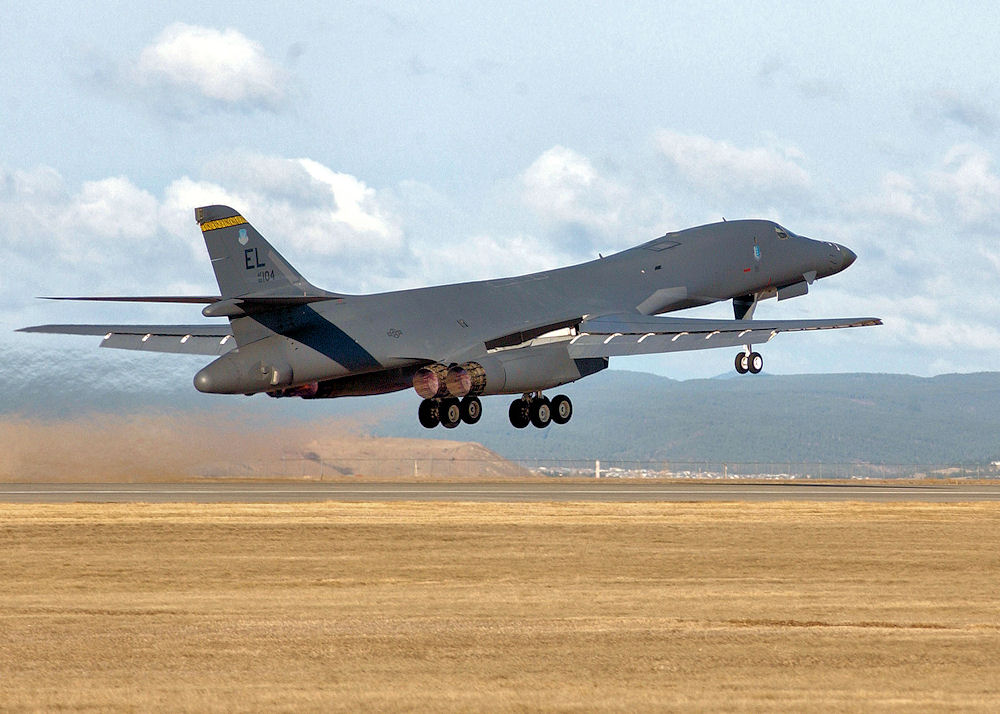
Rockwell B-1B Lancer Lot V (86–104) of the 37th Bomb Squadron

Activated on 1 September 1991 as part of the Air Force's Objective Wing reorganization. Elements periodically deploy to Diego Garcia for Air Expeditionary duty since 11 September 2001.

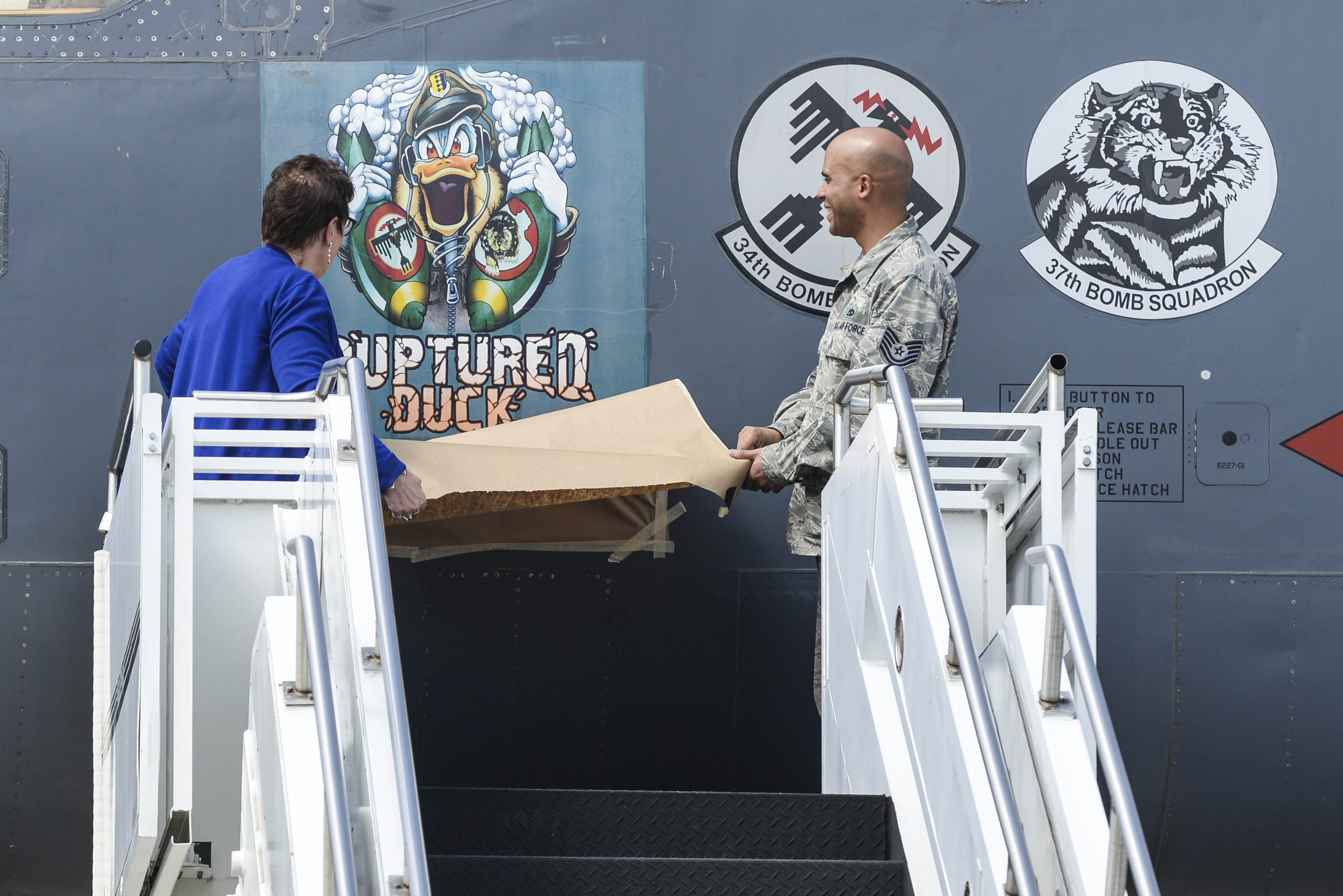
28th OG flagship jet nose art

== Lineage ==
- Established as the 28th Composite Group on 22 December 1939

Activated on 1 February 1940
Redesignated 28th Bombardment Group (Composite) on 11 December 1943
Inactivated on 20 October 1945

- Redesignated 28th Bombardment Group, Very Heavy on 15 July 1946

Activated on 4 August 1946
Redesignated: 28th Bombardment Group, Medium on 28 May 1948
Redesignated: 28th Bombardment Group, Heavy on 16 May 1949
Redesignated: 28th Strategic Reconnaissance Group on 1 April 1950
Redesignated: 28th Strategic Reconnaissance Group, Heavy on 16 July 1950
Inactivated on 16 June 1952

- Redesignated: 28th Bombardment Group, Heavy on 31 July 1985 (remained inactive)
- Redesignated: 28th Operations Group on 29 August 1991

Activated on 1 September 1991

=== Assignments ===
- 1st Wing (later 1st Bombardment Wing), 1 February 1940
- Alaska Defense Command, 23 February 1941 (attached to Air Field Forces, Alaska Defense Command, 21 May-16 October 1941, Air Force, Alaska Defense Command after 17 October 1941)
- Alaskan Air Force (later 11th Air Force, Eleventh Air Force), 15 January 1942 (attached to Provisional XI Bomber Command after c. 5 February 1942)
- XI Bomber Command, 19 March 1943
- Eleventh Air Force, 31 March 1944 – 20 October 1945
- Fifteenth Air Force, 4 August 1946 (attached to Alaskan Air Command after 20 October 1946)
- Strategic Air Command, 1 January 1947 (attached to Alaskan Air Command)
- Alaskan Air Command, 4 February 1947
- Fifteenth Air Force, 10 March 1947
- 28th Bombardment Wing (later 28th Strategic Reconnaissance) Wing), 15 August 1947 – 16 June 1952 (attached to 3d Air Division, 19 July-18 October 1948)
- 28th Wing (later 28th Bomb Wing), 1 September 1991 – present

=== Components ===
- 4th Airborne Command and Control Squadron: 1 September 1991 – 30 September 1992
- 11th Pursuit Squadron (later 11th Fighter Squadron): 2 February – 7 June 1942
- 18th Pursuit Squadron (later 18th Fighter Squadron): 24 February 1941 – 7 June 1942
- 21st Bombardment Squadron: attached 9 January 1942-c. 19 September 1943
- 28th Air Refueling Squadron: 1 September 1991 – 1 June 1992
- 28th Operations Support Squadron, 1 September 1991 – present
- 34th Bomb Squadron: 19 September 2002–present
- 34th Pursuit Squadron: 1 February-30 November 1940
- 36th Bombardment Squadron: 1 February 1940 – 19 October 1943
- 37th Bombardment Squadron (later 37th Bomb Squadron): 1 February 1940 – 23 April 1941; 1 September 1991–present
- 73d Bombardment Squadron: 3 May 1941 – 6 October 1943
- 77th Bombardment Squadron (later 77th Strategic Reconnaissance Squadron, 77th Bomb Squadron): 2 January 1942 – 20 October 1945; 4 August 1946 – 16 June 1952 (detached after 10 February 1951); 1 September 1991 – 31 March 1995; 1 April 1997 – 19 September 2002
- 404th Bombardment Squadron: attached c. 12 July-c. 20 September 1942, assigned c. 21 September 1942 – 20 October 1945
- 406th Bombardment Squadron: attached c. June 1942-c. October 1943
- 717th Bombardment Squadron (later 717th Strategic Reconnaissance) Squadron): 4 August 1946 – 16 June 1952 (detached after 10 February 1951)
- 718th Bombardment Squadron (later 718th Strategic Reconnaissance) Squadron): 4 August 1946 – 16 June 1952 (detached after 10 February 1951)

=== Stations ===
- March Field, California, 1 February 1940
- Moffett Field, California, 10 December 1940 – 12 February 1941
- Elmendorf Field, Alaska, 23 February 1941
- Adak Army Airfield, Aleutian Islands, Alaska, 14 March 1943
- Shemya Army Air Base, Aleutian Islands, Alaska, 26 February 1944 – 20 October 1945
- Grand Island Army Air Field, Nebraska, 4 August-6 October 1946
- Elmendorf Field, Alaska, 20 October 1946 – 25 April 1947
- Rapid City Army Air Base (later Rapid City Airfield, Rapid City Air Force Base), South Dakota, 3 May 1947 – 16 June 1952 (deployed at RAF Scampton, England, 19 July-19 October 1948
- Ellsworth Air Force Base, South Dakota, 1 September 1991 – present

=== Aircraft ===
- Douglas B-18 Bolo, 1940–1943
- Curtiss P-36 Hawk, 1940, 1941–1942
- North American B-25 Mitchell, 1941–1945
- Curtiss P-40 Warhawk, 1941–1942
- Lockheed A-29 Hudson, 1942–1943
- Boeing B-17 Flying Fortress, 1942–1943
- Consolidated B-24 Liberator, 1942–1945
- Martin B-26 Marauder, 1942–1943
- Martin AT-23 Marauder, 1943–1944
- Martin TB-26 Marauder, 1945
- Consolidated LB-30 Liberator, 1942
- Lockheed B-34 Ventura, 1944
- Boeing B-29 Superfortress, 1946–1950; RB-29, 1950
- Convair B-36 Peacemaker, 1949–1950
- Rockwell B-1 Lancer, 1991–present
- Boeing KC-135 Stratotanker, 1991–1992
- Boeing EC-135, 1991–1992
