= XI Fighter Command =

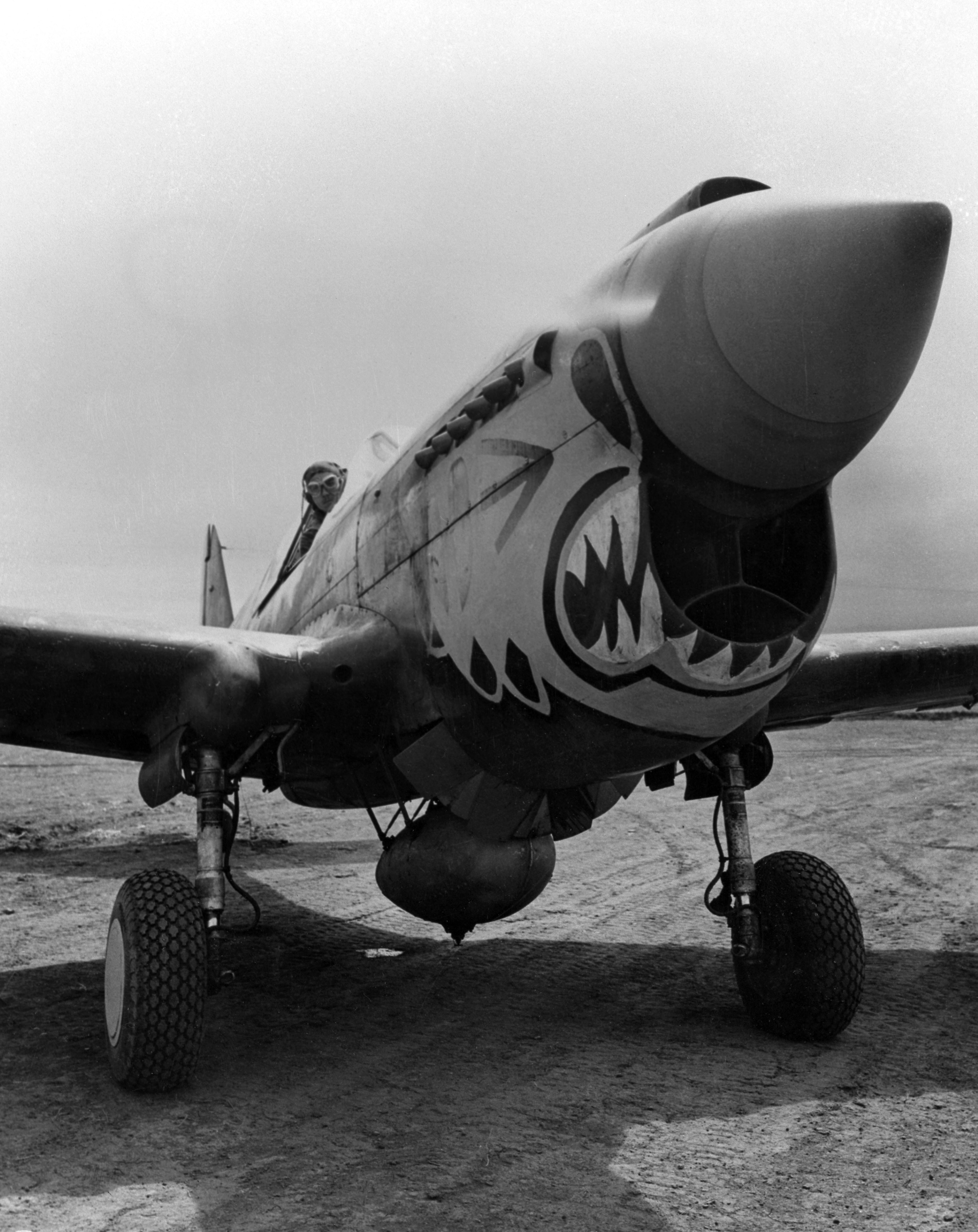
- P-40E-CU Warhawk of 11th Fighter Squadron, XI Fighter Command
- Active: 1942–1944
- Country: United States
- Branch: United States Air Force
- Role: Command of fighter units
- Engagements: Aleutian Islands Campaign

The XI Fighter Command was a command of the United States Army Air Forces. It was assigned to Eleventh Air Force, stationed at Adak Army Airfield, Alaska.

The command controlled fighter units in Alaska during the World War II Aleutian Islands Campaign under Eleventh Air Force. It was activated in March 1942 and inactivated on 31 March 1944.

== Lineage ==
- Constituted as the 11th Interceptor Command on 8 March 1942 (Note: Maurer indicates unit was constituted as the "XI" Interceptor Command. However, the unit was constituted and activated with an arabic number in its name. The use of roman numerals to designate Army Air Forces combat commands did not begin until September 1942. "Air Force Historical Research Agency Organizational Reconds: Types of USAF Organizations". Air Force History Index. 9 January 2008.)

Activated in Alaska on 15 March 1942
Redesignated 11th Fighter Command on 15 May 1942
Redesignated XI Fighter Command c. 18 September 1942
Disbanded in Alaska on 31 March 1944

=== Assignments ===
- Eleventh Air Force, 15 March 1942 – 31 March 1944

=== Stations ===
- Elmendorf Field, Alaska, 15 March 1942
- Adak Army Airfield, Alaska, 12 September 1943 – 31 March 1944

== Components ==
Group

- 343d Fighter Group: 15 March 1942 – 31 March 1944

Squadrons

- 11th Fighter Squadron: 7 June – 11 September 1942
- 18th Fighter Squadron: 7 June – 11 September 1942
- 54th Fighter Squadron: 31 May – 11 September 1942
