= 54th Fighter Squadron =

54th Fighter Squadron

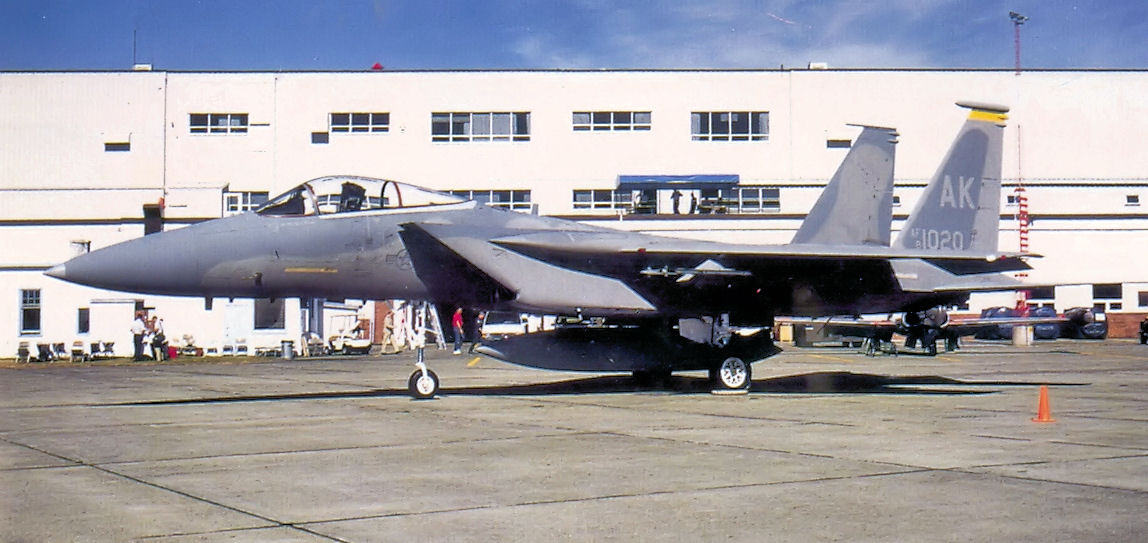
- 54th Tactical Fighter Squadron F-15C Eagle (Note: Aircraft is McDonnell Douglas F-15C-30-MC Eagle serial 81-20)
- Active: 1941–1946; 1952–1960; 1991-2000
- Country: United States
- Branch: United States Air Force
- Role: Fighter
- Part of: Pacific Air Forces
- Nickname(s): Alaska's First Guardians
- Motto(s): Alaska's First Guardian[s] (1987-1988, 1989-)
- Decorations: Air Force Outstanding Unit Award

Insignia
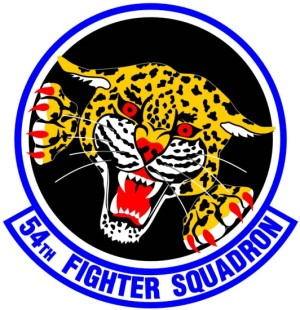
- 54th Fighter Squadron emblem (approved 4 April 1989)

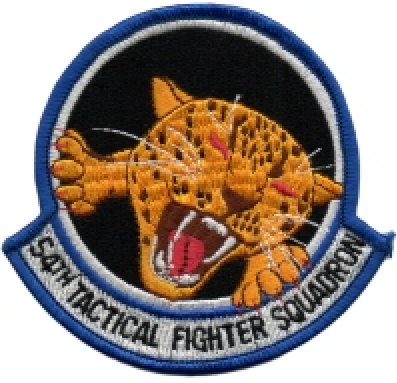
- Patch with 54th Tactical Fighter Squadron emblem (approved 3 June 1988)

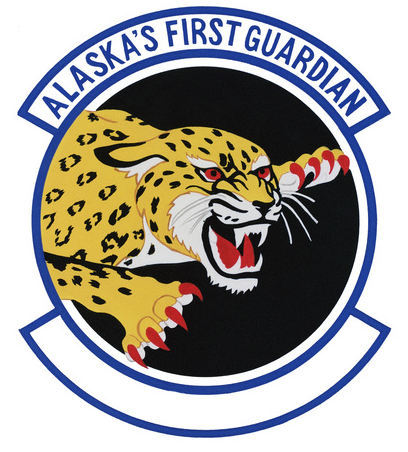
- 54 Tactical Fighter Squadron emblem (1987) (approved 4 June 1987)

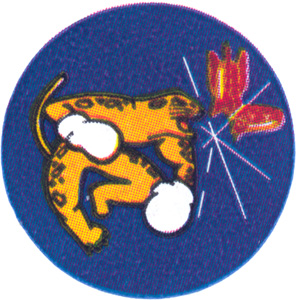
- 54th Fighter Squadron emblem (approved 2 September 1943)

The 54th Fighter Squadron is an inactive United States Air Force unit. Its last assignment was to the 3d Operations Group, being stationed at Elmendorf Air Force Base, Alaska. It was inactivated on 28 April 2000.

== History ==
=== World War II ===
Activated on 15 Jan 1941 at Hamilton Field, California as a Curtiss P-40 Warhawk pursuit unit as part of the defense buildup of the United States prior to World War II.

Deployed to Alaska in mid-1942 and engaged the Japanese during the Aleutian Campaign during World War II. Engaged in combat in the Aleutians, 1942–1943 with long-range Lockheed P-38 Lightnings. Remained in Alaska after the removal of Japanese forces, flying long range escorts for B-24 Liberator bombing attacks of northern Japanese Kurile Islands, inactivated in 1946.

=== Air Defense ===
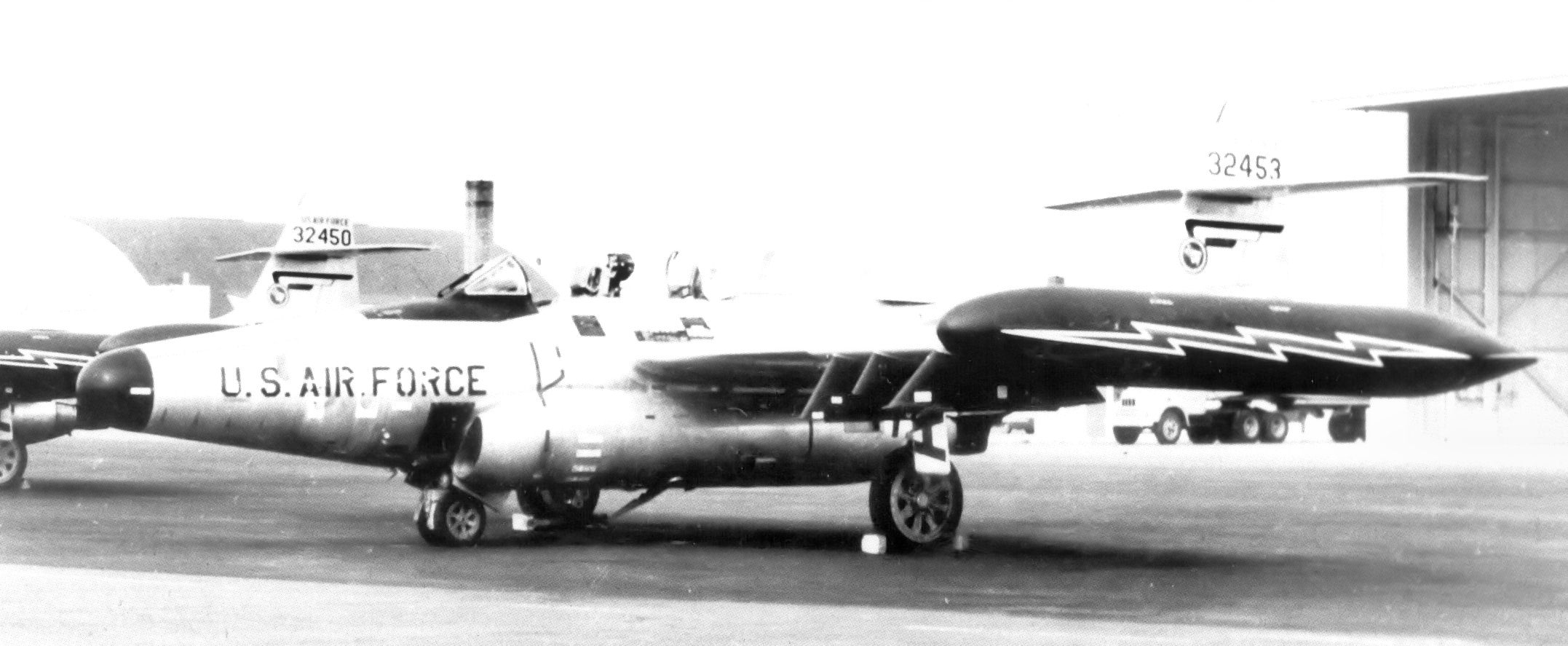
F-89J Scorpion stationed at Ellsworth AFB (Note: Aircraft is Northrop F-89J-50-NO Scorpion serial 53-2453, loading an inert Genie nuclear missile at Tyndall AFB, Florida in 1957)

Reactivated in 1952 at Rapid City Air Force Base, South Dakota, assuming the personnel and aircraft of the 175th Fighter-Interceptor Squadron, a North Dakota Air National Guard that had been called to active service for the Korean War and which returned to state control. Mission was to provide air defense for North Central United States. Assumed ANG North American F-51D Mustangs, upgraded to Republic F-84D Thunderjet jet aircraft being returned from combat in Korea in July 1953. Upgraded to F-84Gs in December 1953; upgraded to North American F-86D Sabre in April 1954; upgraded to Northrop F-89J Scorpion interceptors in 1957. Inactivated on 25 December 1960.

=== Return to Alaska ===
Reactivated as a McDonnell Douglas F-15 Eagle air superiority squadron in Alaska in 1987, it provided air defense until being inactivated in 2000.

== Lineage ==
- Constituted as the 54th Pursuit Squadron (Interceptor) on 20 November 1940

Activated on 15 January 1941
Redesignated 54th Pursuit Squadron (Interceptor) (Twin Engine) on 31 January 1942
Redesignated 54th Fighter Squadron (Twin Engine) on 15 May 1942
Redesignated 54th Fighter Squadron, Two Engine on 20 Aug 1943
Inactivated on 21 Mar 1946

- Redesignated 54th Fighter-Interceptor Squadron on 10 October 1952

Activated on 1 December 1952
Discontinued and inactivated on 25 December 1960

- Redesignated 54th Tactical Fighter Squadron on 13 January 1987

Activated on 8 May 1987
Redesignated 54th Fighter Squadron on 26 September 1991
Inactivated on 28 April 2000

=== Assignments ===
- 55th Pursuit Group (later 55th Fighter Group), 15 Jan 1941 (attached to XI Fighter Command after 31 May 1942) (Note: Both Maurer and the 54th Fighter Squadron give this date as 1941. This seems doubtful since the squadron moved to Alaska in May 1942. The Maurer entry appears to be a typographic error and the factsheet is based on Maurer. Maurer, Combat Squadrons, pp. 223-224)
- 343d Fighter Group, 11 September 1942 – 21 March 1946
- 31st Air Division, 1 December 1952
- 29th Air Division, 16 February 1953 – 25 December 1960
- 21st Tactical Fighter Wing, 8 May 1987
- 21st Operations Group, 26 September 1991
- 3d Operations Group, 19 December 1991 – 28 April 2000

=== Stations ===
- Hamilton Field, California, 15 January 1941
- Portland Army Air Base, Oregon, 22 May 1941
- Paine Field, Washington, 22 January – 25 May 1942
- Elmendorf Field, Alaska, 31 May–c. 24 August 1942

Detachments at Fort Randall Army Air Field, Alaska, c. 6 Jun-c. 31 Jul 1942 and Fort Glenn Army Air Base, Alaska, c. 6 June–c. 19 September 1942

- Adak Army Air Field, Alaska, c. 31 August 1942
- Amchitka Army Air Field, Alaska, 12 March 1943
- Shemya Army Air Field, Alaska, c. 18 October 1943
- Alexai Point Army Air Field, Attu, Alaska, c. 20 November 1943 – 8 March 1946
- Fort Lawton, Washington, 20–21 March 1946
- Rapid City Air Force Base (later Ellsworth Air Force Base), South Dakota, 1 December 1952 – 25 December 1960
- Elmendorf Air Force Base, Alaska, 8 May 1987 – 28 April 2000

=== Aircraft ===
- Seversky P-35, 1941–1942
- Curtiss P-40 Warhawk, 1941–1942
- Republic P-43 Lancer, 1941–1942
- Lockheed F-5 Lightning, 1943
- Lockheed P-38 Lightning, 1942–1946
- North American F-51D Mustang, 1952–1953
- Republic F-84G Thunderjet, 1953–1954
- North American F-86D Sabre, 1954–1957
- Northrop F-89J Scorpion, 1957–1960
- McDonnell Douglas F-15C Eagle, 1987–2000
- McDonnell Douglas F-15D Eagle, 1987–2000
