= XI Bomber Command =

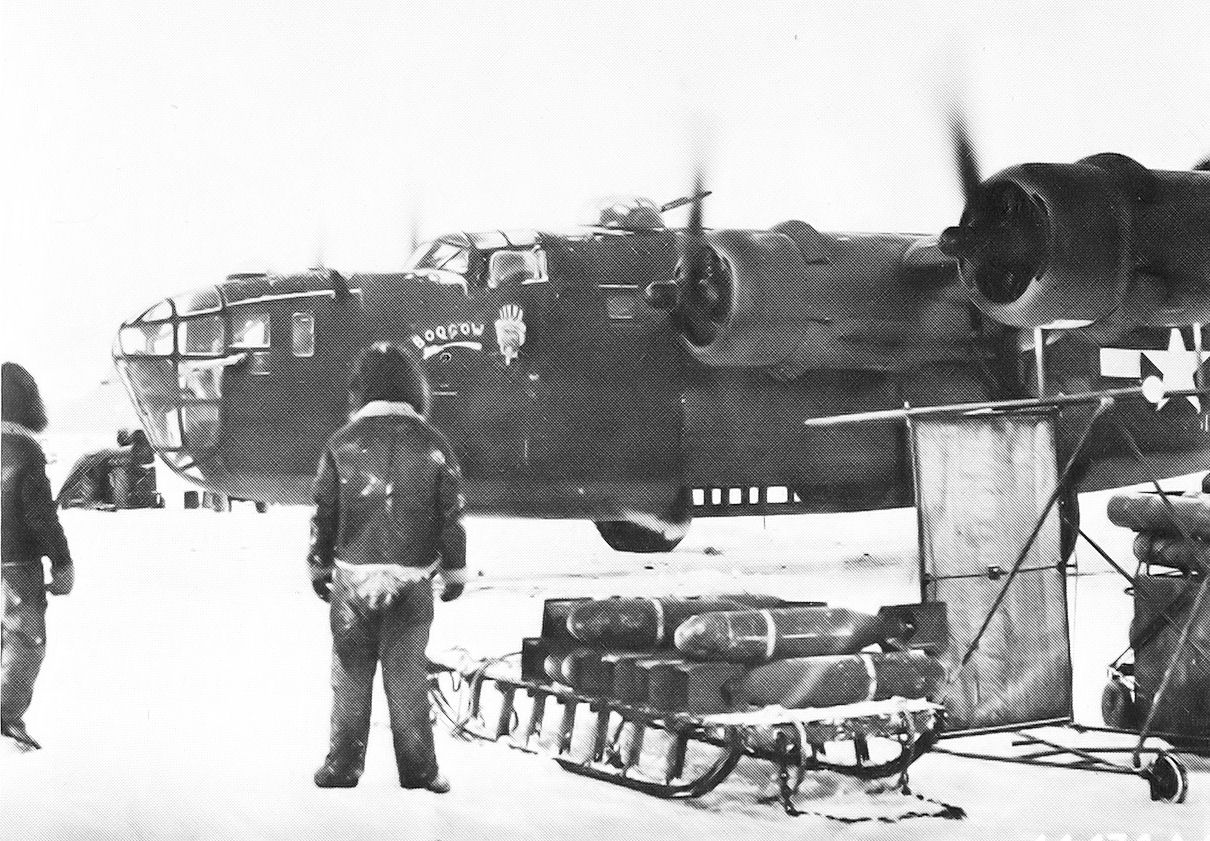
- Command B-24 Liberator at Amchitka Army Air Field
- Active: 1943–1944
- Country: United States
- Branch: United States Army Air Forces
- Role: Command of bombardment units
- Engagements: Aleutian Islands campaign

The XI Bomber Command was a formation of the United States Army Air Forces. It was assigned to Eleventh Air Force, and its last station was Shemya Army Air Base, Alaska, where it was inactivated on 31 March 1944.

== History ==
Eleventh Air Force organized the 11th Bombardment Command (Provisional) on 1 March 1942. The provisional unit was discontinued in March 1943 and replaced by a permanent unit, XI Bomber Command. The command controlled primarily medium and light bomber units deployed to Alaska during the Aleutian Islands Campaign in conjunction with Eleventh Air Force.

== Lineage ==
- Constituted as the XI Bomber Command on 4 March 1943

Activated on 19 March 1943
Disbanded on 31 March 1944

=== Assignments ===
- Eleventh Air Force, 19 March 1943 – 31 March 1944

=== Stations ===
- Adak Army Air Field, Alaska, 19 March 1943
- Amchitka Army Air Field, Alaska, 24 June 1943
- Adak Army Air Field, Alaska, 4 September 1943
- Shemya Army Air Base, Alaska, 3–31 March 1944

=== Components ===
- 28th Bombardment Group, 19 March 1943 – 31 March 1944
