= Eareckson Air Station =

US Air Force military airport on Shemya island in the Aleutian Islands, Alaska

- Shemya Island, Alaska in the United States
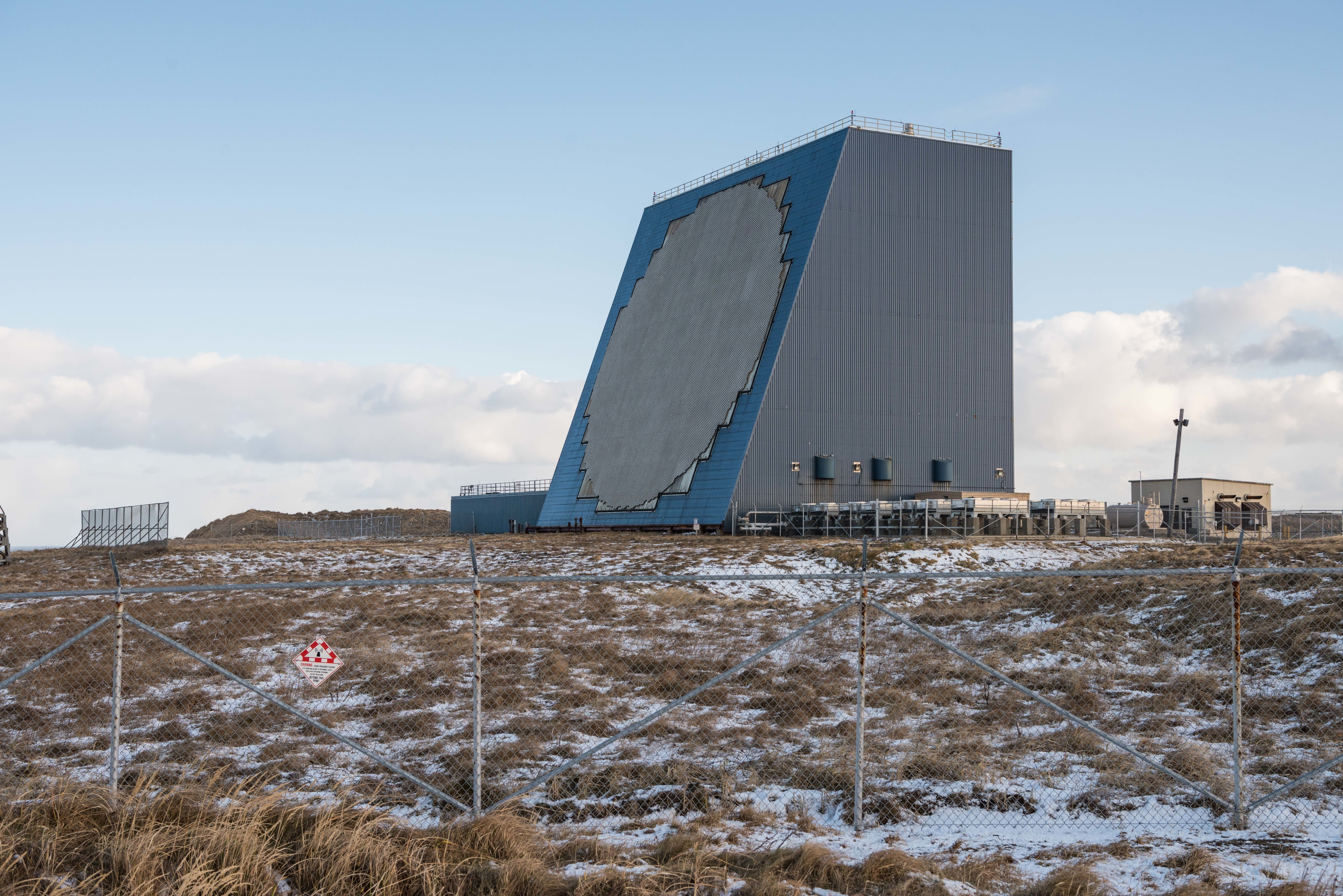
- The Cobra Dane L-band phased-array radar located at Eareckson AS

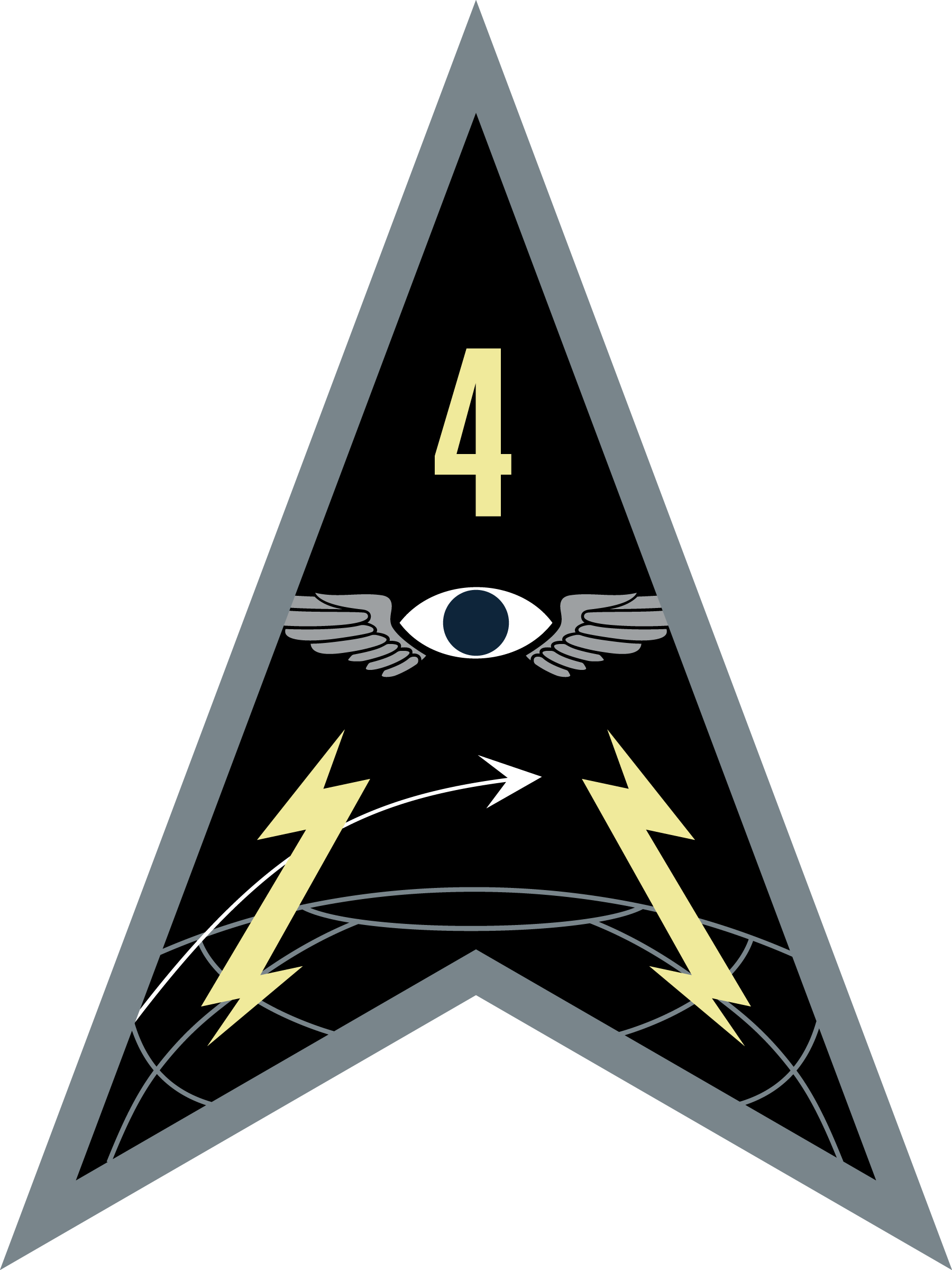

Site information
- Type: US military airfield and radar
- Owner: Department of Defense
- Operator: US Air Force (airfield); US Space Force (radar)
- Controlled by: Pacific Air Forces Regional Support Center (airfield); Space Delta 4 (radar)
- Condition: Operational
- Radar type: AN/FPS-108 Cobra Dane

Location
- Location within Alaska
- Coordinates: 52°42′44″N 174°06′49″E

Site history
- Built: 1943
- In use: 1943 – present
- Events: Near Islands earthquake (1975)

Garrison information
- Occupants: Contractor personnel (Raytheon)

Airfield information
- Identifiers: IATA: SYA, ICAO: PASY, FAA LID: SYA, WMO: 704140
- Elevation: 29.7 metres (97 ft) AMSL
Runways
Direction	Length and surface
10/28	3,049.5 metres (10,005 ft) Asphalt

Eareckson Air Station (IATA: SYA, ICAO: PASY), formerly Shemya Air Force Base, is a United States Air Force military airport located on the island of Shemya, in the Alaskan Aleutian Islands.

The airport was closed as an active Air Force Station on 1 July 1994. However, it is still owned by the USAF and is operated by the USAF Pacific Air Forces Regional Support Center at Elmendorf AFB for refueling purposes. It also serves as a diversion airport for civilian aircraft. The base previously hosted the AN/FPS-17 and since 1977 the more powerful AN/FPS-108 COBRA DANE phased-array radar.

== Overview ==
Eareckson Air Station is located on the western tip of Alaska's Aleutian islands near the larger island of Attu, lying approximately 1,500 miles southwest of Anchorage. The airport lies on the south side of the 2-mile by 4-mile island and is 98 feet above mean sea level.

Shemya Island has been the scene of two major earthquakes. The 1965 Rat Islands earthquake, measuring 8.7 on the moment magnitude scale, occurred on 3 February. It was followed by severe aftershocks and a tsunami, but damage was limited to cracks in the taxiways. The 1975 Near Islands earthquake, measuring 7.6 (surface wave magnitude), occurred on 1 February. A high degree of damage occurred to the runways and hangars and communications were disrupted for a short time.

Eareckson Air Station has one runway:

- Runway 10/28: 10,004 by 150 feet (3,049 m × 46 m), surface: asphalt/grooved, 28 is ILS equipped.
- The island has many abandoned taxiways, aircraft revetments and two other runways on the west side of the island. All of these World War II facilities are abandoned and non-operational.

There are also an NDB, TACAN and VOR on the island.

== William O. Eareckson ==
On 6 April 1993, Shemya Air Force Base was renamed Eareckson Air Station after Colonel William O. Eareckson (1900–1966). The renaming was initiated by the Eleventh Air Force Association to honor their wartime commander. From 1941 to 1943, Eareckson personally led all of the difficult missions against the Japanese which were located on two other Aleutian Islands, Kiska and Attu. Eareckson also helped plan the successful retaking of Attu. During the bombing campaigns, he introduced low-level skip bombing and Forward Air Control (FAC) procedures long before they became common practices in other war theaters.

== History ==
=== World War II ===
On 28 May 1943, a small detachment of Alaskan Scouts began reconnaissance of Shemya, a small, flat, uninhabited island 35 miles to the east of Attu. The following day, United States Army Engineers came ashore to begin construction of a runway suitable for B-29 Superfortress bombers. Tents were erected, a rudimentary electrical system, radios and some rough streets were laid down. A 10,000-foot runway was constructed, along with two 5,000-foot cross runways.

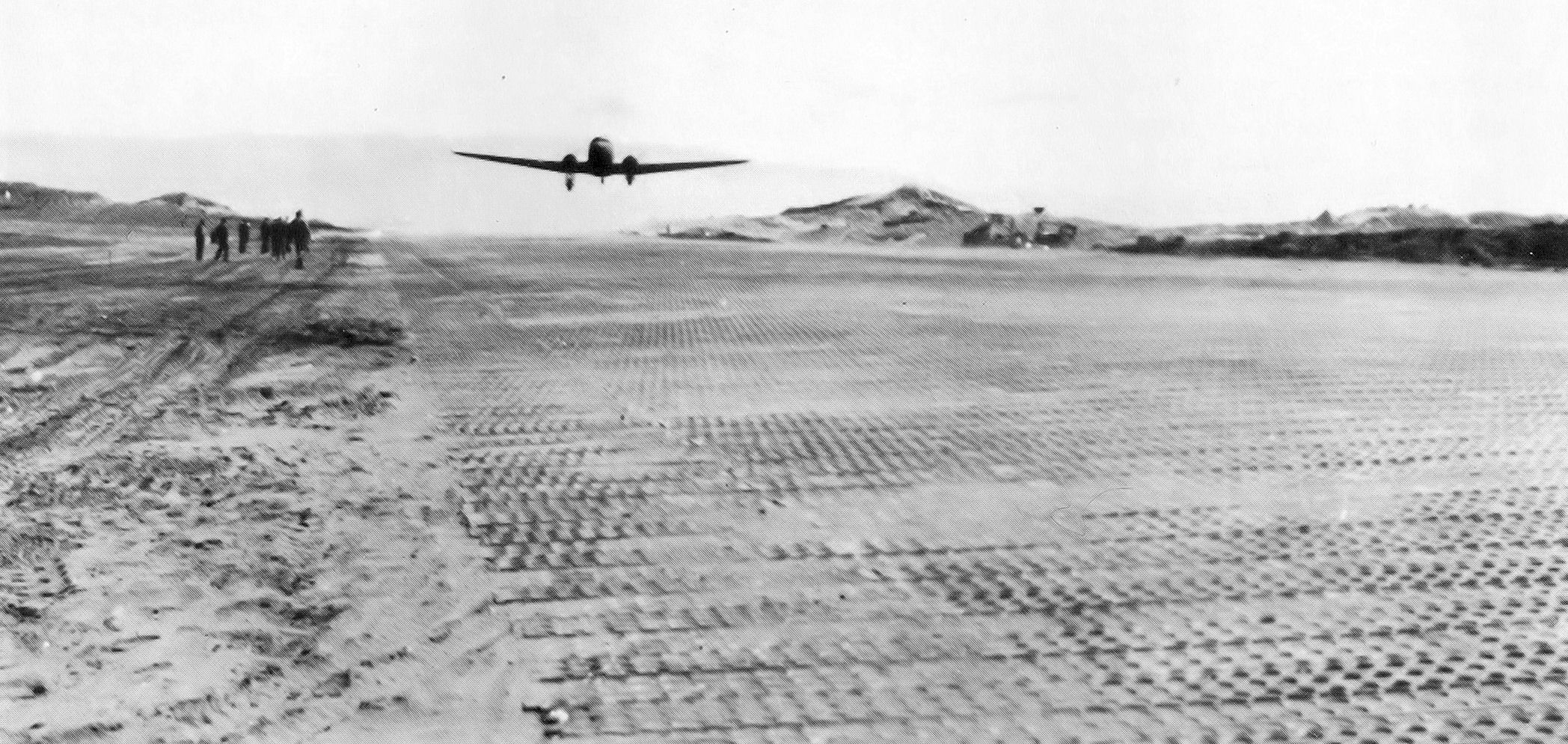
First landing on Shemya AAF, 24 June 1943

The 404th Bombardment Squadron flew B-24 Liberator heavy bombers along with one Beechcraft AT-7, which was used for navigator training. The 344th Fighter Squadron flew both P-40 Warhawks and P-38 Lightnings. In addition, a North American AT-6 was utilized for pilot training. One RB-34, a UC-64A and numerous TB-26s were flown by the 15th Tow Target Squadron that was stationed on Shemya. The Navy assigned one squadron of Consolidated PB4Y-2 Privateers, which were single tail versions of the twin tail B-24. Many administrative and cargo aircraft, such as the C-47 "Gooney Bird" flew in and out of Shemya during the war. The dispersal aircraft standings were placed in the area to the north of the main runway.

With the successful completion of the Aleutian Campaign in August 1943, Eleventh Air Force came within striking distance of the Japanese Kurile Islands, the northernmost being 750 miles to the south-southwest of Shemya. The Japanese had established a sizable defense complex on the northernmost islands, with most installations being located on Paramushiro, the largest island in the chain. It supported three airfields and the Imperial Japanese Army Kashiwabra Staging Area. In addition, it was the headquarters for the Imperial Japanese Navy Fifth Fleet, located on Kataoka.

The mission of Eleventh Air Force was to take advantage of the new airfields on Shemya and Attu, and carry out offensive operations against the enemy forces in the Kuriles. Orders were issued in early July 1943 for the first bombing attack on the Japanese Home Islands since the April 1942 Doolittle Raid. Crews and aircraft were to be provided by the 21st, 36th and 77th bomb Squadrons. Initially Eleventh Air Force had little intelligence available about the Kurile Islands. IX Bomber Command coordinated with Navy personnel who were able to provide various documents, maps and other documents about the Islands. This included captured Japanese documents from Attu. From this information the command put together an accurate assessment of the Japanese military installations on the island chain.

On 10 July 1943, eight B-25 Mitchells from the 77th Bombardment Squadron left Adak AAF and refueled at Alexai Point AAF on Attu. High-explosive bombs were also loaded on the aircraft. Six B-24 Liberator bombers from the 21st Bombardment Squadron on Shemya were scheduled to join them, but they were diverted to attack Japanese transport ships spotted by a Navy PBY aircrew. The B-25s reached Paramushiro, which they found completely socked in by clouds. Using time/distance calculations they dropped their 500-pound bombs through the clouds on what they believed were the Japanese installations, then headed back to Alexi Point and landed after nine and a half-hour, 1,000-mile flight. At the time, it was the longest B-25 Mitchell mission of the war. Meanwhile, the B-24 Liberators had attacked the transports but failed to achieve any hits. One Liberator was hit by anti-aircraft fire from the ships and managed to make a wheels-up landing on Shemya.

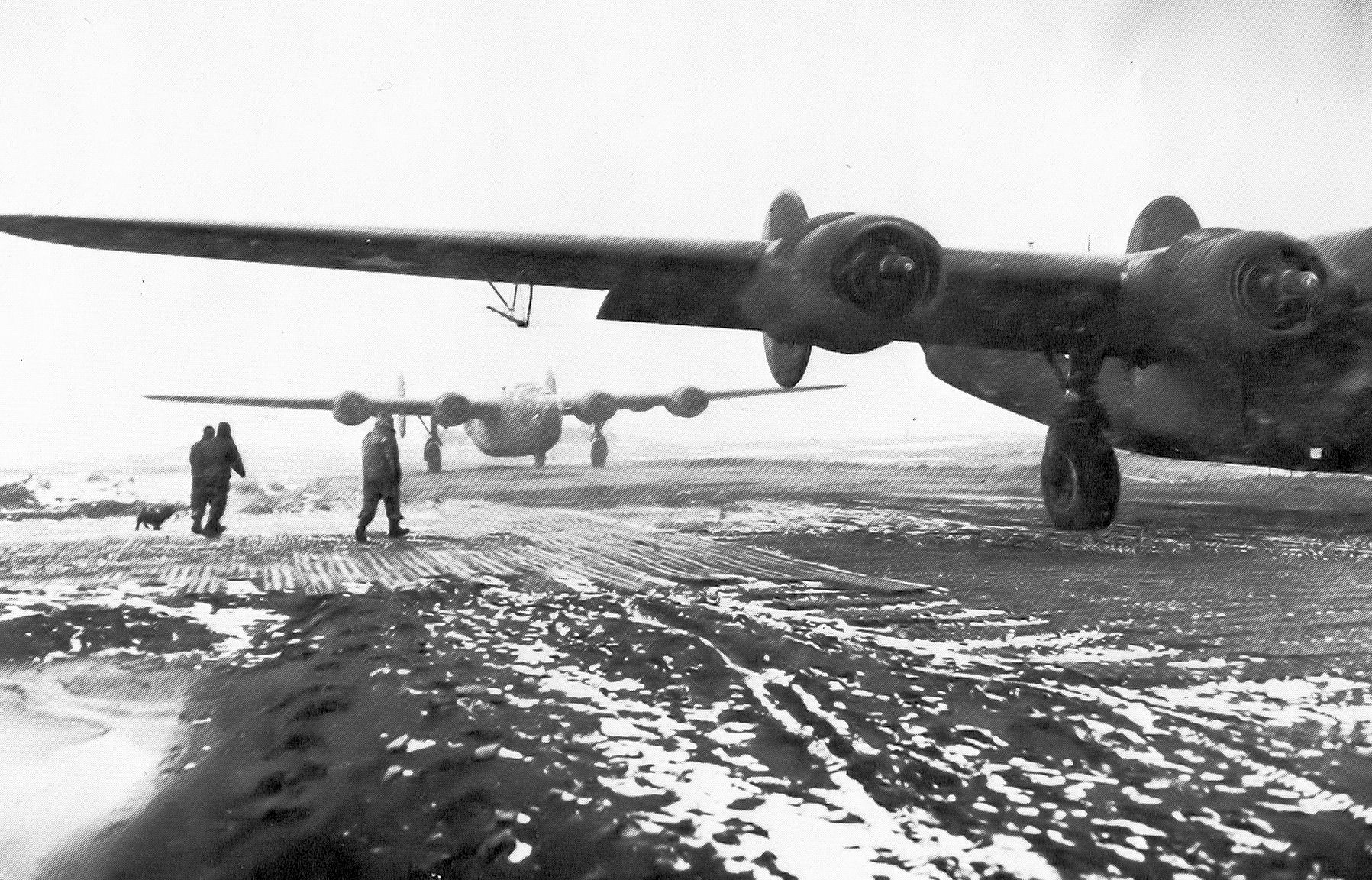
404th Bombardment Squadron B-24 Liberators preparing to take off

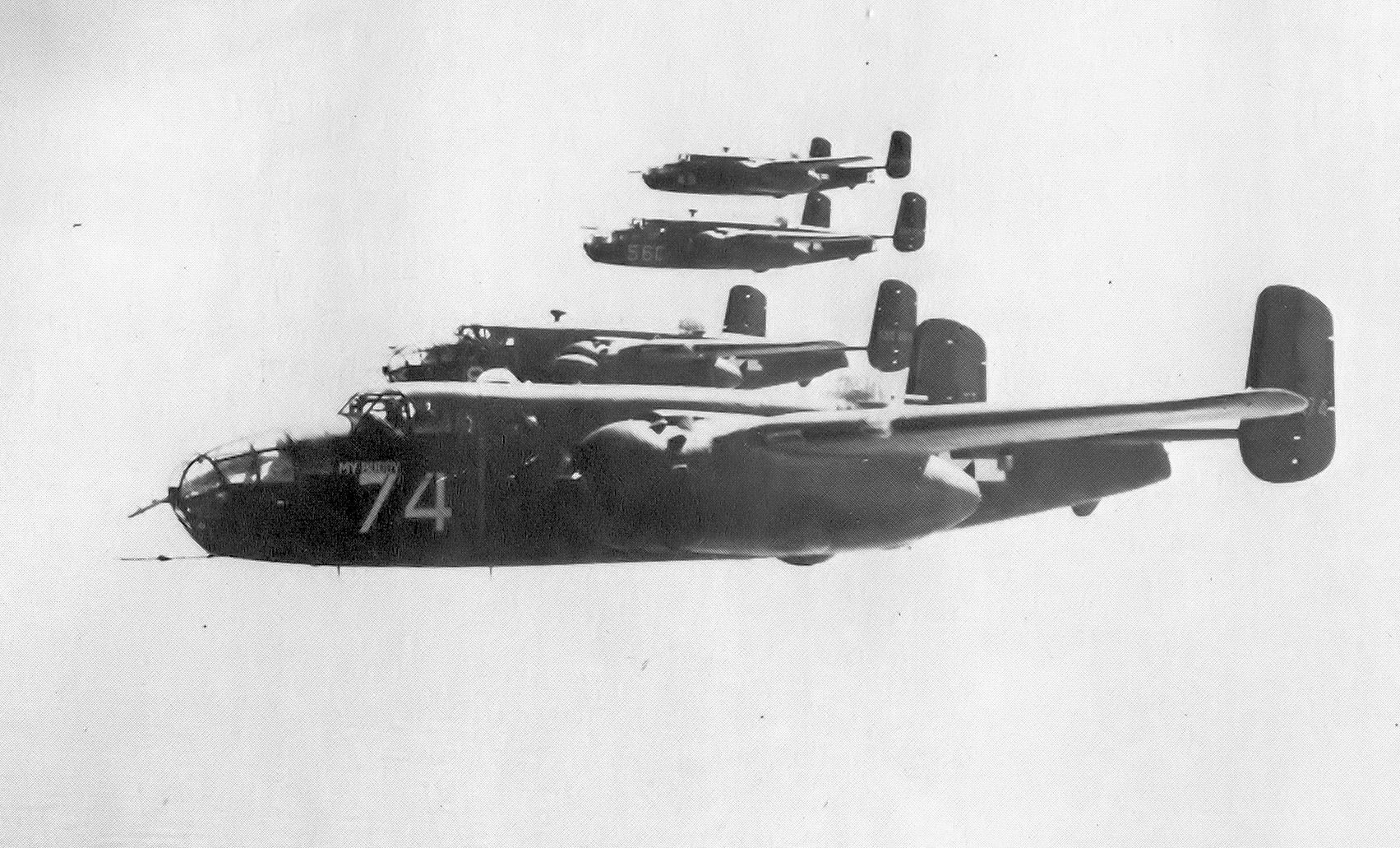
77th Bombardment Squadron B-25 Mitchells in flight

A second attack by B-24 Liberators was launched from Alexai Point and Shemya on 18 July. They found the weather over the northern Kuriles clear with unlimited visibility. The Katkoa Naval Base; Kashiwabra Army Staging Area and a nearby airfield were attacked. However, no hits were observed on the targets. The Japanese defenses were taken by surprise, with only five Mitsubishi A6M "Zero" and a few Nakajima A6M2-N "Rufe" float plane interceptors sent up which were unable to catch the retreating B-24s. After staging through Attu and Shemya for refueling, the B-24s returned to Adak AAF. Most importantly, aerial photographs were taken over the targets which were provided to intelligence analysts. The third attack on 11 August found the Japanese defenses prepared for the American bombers. B-24s from the 404th Bombardment Squadron and B-24s from the 21st Bombardment Squadron were met by intense anti-aircraft fire when they arrived over the Kataoka Naval Base and the Kashiwabra Army Staging Area. This time numerous bomb hits were observed on both targets and many aerial photographs were taken. About 40 Zeros were launched to intercept the Americans and in a 35-minute air battle, the B-24 gunners claimed four Zeros shot down, with one probable and four possibles. The Japanese managed to shoot down one B-24. Another B-24 diverted to Soviet territory and crash-landed at the airfield at Petropavlovsk on Kamchatka Peninsula. One airman was killed in the crash and the survivors were, at least officially, interned in the Soviet Union. At the time, the Soviets were officially, for strategic reasons, neutral in the war between the Japanese Empire and Western Allies; in order to maintain this neutrality, international law required Soviet authorities to intern any Western Allied personnel forced to seek refuge in the USSR as a result of operations against Japan. In reality, however, US aviators who made forced landings on Kamchatka were secretly returned to the United States, by way of a camp in the Kazakh SSR and Iran (which was under British and Soviet occupation at the time). The US aircraft involved were generally retained in the USSR. Over the next few years, dozens of US aircraft with mechanical problems and/or damage from by Japanese defenses were diverted to Soviet bases on Kamchatka – usually Petropavlovsk-Kamchatsky. By the end of 1944, several hundred US aviators had been interned in the Soviet Union. Some of the internees complained about their treatment in the USSR – including accommodation which, to the Americans, resembled prisoner of war camps, and their interrogation by Soviet officials.

The aerial photos taken on the raid of 11 August 1943 showed that the Japanese were building up forces in the area, transferring aircraft presumably from air bases on Hokkaido. The Japanese early-warning system, however, did not seem to be effective as the interceptor aircraft were launched after the B-24s attacked their targets. After a month, in which the Eleventh Air Force units on Shemya and Attu concentrated on attacking Kiska and forcing the Japanese to withdraw from the island, the next mission against the Kuriles was flown on 11 September 1943. It was the most disastrous mission flown by Eleventh Air Force and was the last flown in 1943. Seven B-24s of the 404th Bombardment Squadron and twelve B-25s of the 77th Bombardment Squadron lifted off from Alexi Point AAF and headed to the Kuriles. The B-24s attacked the Kashiwabra Army Staging Area and as they turned towards home, they were attacked by numerous Japanese interceptors. Three of the Liberators were severely damaged and headed for Petropavlovsk where they crash-landed. The B-25s conducted a low-level raid on shipping between Paramushir and Shumshu Islands. On coming out of their bomb run, they also were attacked by numerous Japanese interceptors. After an hour of continuing attacks by the interceptors, one B-25 was shot down and five others were severely damaged and had to land at Petropavlovsk. Eleventh Air Force had lost over half its bombers. It was six months before another attack was made by IX Bomber Command on the Kuriles.

After the disastrous attack, the focus of Eleventh Air Force was shifted to a defensive posture in the event of retaliatory attacks from the Japanese. Also the command was reorganized in light of the new mission and the reduction of forces in the Aleutians after the conclusion of the Aleutian Islands Campaign. The IX Strategic Command was activated as a provisional organization with the inactivation of IX Fighter and IX Bomber Command; remaining staff being assigned to the provisional Command. The 28th Bombardment Group and 404th Bombardment Squadron were assigned to Shemya; the 77th Fighter Squadron assigned to Alexi Point. The mission would be to carry out both day and night bombing and photo-reconnaissance attacks on the Kuriles, and also to conduct searches for Japanese shipping, including fishing vessels in the North Pacific. The Navy Fleet Air Wing Four at Naval Air Station Attu and IX Strategic Command would be assigned to the Navy's North Pacific Command for operational control. The 77th Bombardment Squadron with B-25 Mitchells assumed the primary responsibility for searching for Japanese shipping, as the Mitchells were very suited for low-level attacks. However, within a few weeks, IX Strategic Command was disestablished and all Eleventh Air Force units came under the direct control of HQ Eleventh Air Force, now at Davis AAF on Adak.

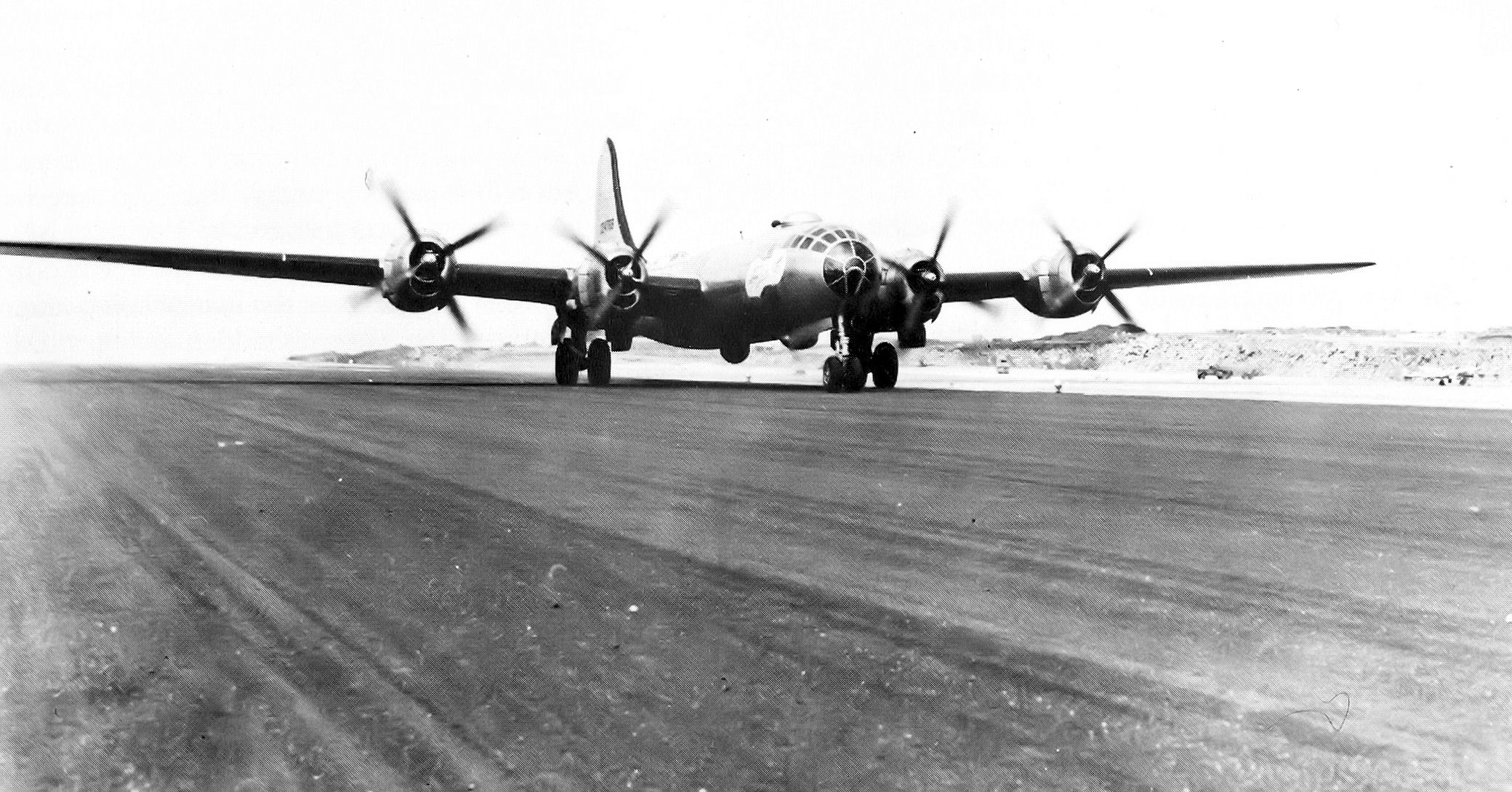
Although designed for B-29 Superfortress operations, Shemya Army Airfield only saw one B-29 land during the war. This Superfortress was deployed to Ladd AAF, Alaska for cold weather testing in May 1945, and made a landing at Shemya. It stayed overnight then departed the next morning for Amchitka AAF.

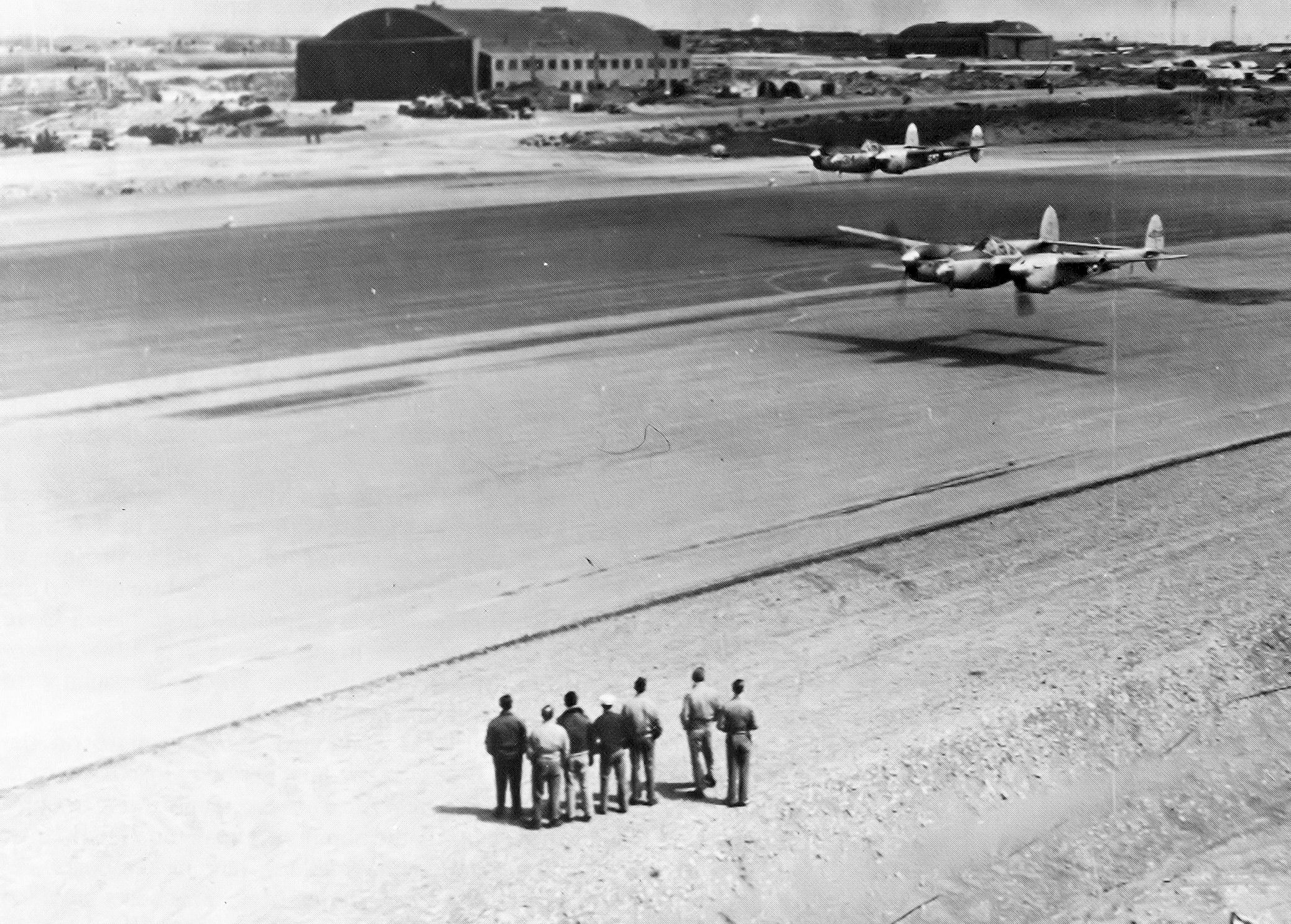
P-38 Lightnings making a low-level pass over the runway at Shemya AAF, 1 August 1945 during the Armed Forces Day celebration

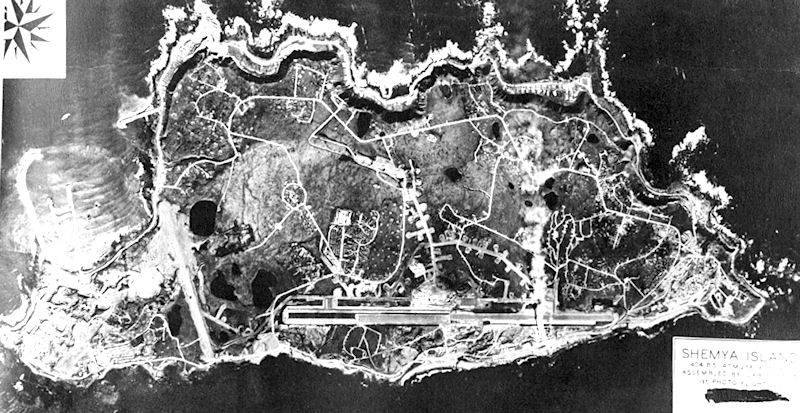
Shemya Island, October 1944

The spring of 1944 brought improving weather and the B-24s and PV-1s to fly more missions over the Kuriles. Most flights were photo-reconnaissance or the occasional bombing attack to keep the Japanese off-guard and were flown at night using flash bombs for night photography. In early April, the 2d Photographic Charting Squadron arrived with four F-7 Liberators, from Peterson Field, Colorado, configured for photo-reconnaissance and mapping. Over the next five months, over 3,000 photographs of the Kuriles were taken and highly detailed and accurate maps of the islands were created.

By August, Eleventh Air Force B-24s were carrying out successful and accurate attacks on the Japanese military installations and the B-25s were successful in driving the Japanese fishing and much of the shipping out of the North Pacific. In October, in an effort to cripple the Japanese food supply, the B-25s were ordered to fly missions against canneries and other food processing plants in the Kuriles.

Additional aircraft and personnel reductions occurred in 1945 and almost all air bases other than Alexi Point, Shemya and Davis in the Aleutians were reduced to caretaker status. Weather hampered missions over the winter, although new B-24Js were received by the 404th Bomb Squadron and longer-range P-38L Lightnings were received by the 54th Fighter Squadron. Along with the mission against the Kuriels, the P-38s were assigned the mission of shooting down Japanese bomb-carrying fire balloons which were launched from Japan along great circle routes near the Aleutians. The balloons were designed to carry incendiary bombs over the United States and start fires in the Pacific Northwest. Although they floated above 38,000 feet, several were shot down, and one landed on Amchatka where intelligence personnel recovered it for inspection.

The limited resources assigned to the Eleventh Air Force meant only a limited number of missions could be carried out over the Kuriles. The 404th Bomb Squadron, consisting of a dozen B-24s by May 1945, carried out missions over Paramushiro and lost two aircraft. The 77th Bomb Squadron flew a B-25 mission over the Minami Cape Radar Station and lost two aircraft; both crews captured by the Japanese. Two other B-24 missions over the Kuriles were flown without loss. During the summer of 1945, more missions were flown against the Kuriles the command losing eight B-25s. The 404th lost its last B-24 in June. Missions continued through July, the last combat mission taking place on 13 August, a few days after the United States atomic bomb attacks on Japan.

In August, after the Soviet Union declared war against the Japanese Empire, B-24s were dispatched on reconnaissance and intelligence-gathering missions to observe the Russian activity in the Kuriles. Photographic missions were flown beginning on 4 August and continued until 4 September when the B-24s encountered some Russian fighters and turned back without incident. Although allies, the message from the Soviets was clear: The Kuriles were now in Russian hands and off-limits to American aircraft.

The news of the surrender of the Japanese was met with enthusiasm; the biggest topic was "When do we go home?" Shemya was rapidly reduced to standby status by demobilization and by the end of 1945 and the base was essentially abandoned.

=== Postwar era ===
With the exception of a small station housekeeping unit, Shemya was abandoned after the war. The island was littered with abandoned Army and Navy aircraft wrecks and deteriorating station structures. Abandoned vehicles, warehouse stores of all types, rations, clothing and all the other tools of war, including ammunition and bombs were simply left out to the elements. A small Radar squadron was assigned briefly then was moved out and the last operational combat unit, the 66th Fighter Squadron, left the airfield on 30 May 1947. For a time the Air Force considered transferring the island to the Civil Aeronautics Authority, the forerunner of the Federal Aviation Administration. However, the Air Force decided to retain Shemya because its location provided an ideal refueling stop on the Great Circle Route from Japan to McChord Field, Washington.

The Korean War brought extensive use by the Military Air Transport Service (MATS) for the logistical support of Korea and Japan. Its strategic location drastically shortened the air route to the Orient. With the development of Trans-Pacific airlifters (C-124), Shemya was declared surplus and the base was inactivated on 1 July 1954. The facilities were turned over to the Civil Aeronautics Authority in 1955. They were then leased to Northwest Orient Airlines who remained on the island until 1961 and used the airport as a technical stop for their service between the U.S. and Asia. The airfield was also used as a technical stop by Canadian Pacific Airlines during the early 1950s for its weekly Vancouver, B.C.-Tokyo service.

=== Airline service ===
In later years during the 1970s through to the 1990s, passenger and cargo service into the airfield was operated by Reeve Aleutian Airways flying Lockheed L-188 Electra turboprops and Boeing 727-100 jetliners with service to and from Anchorage via several intermediate stops at other locations in the Aleutian Island chain. The Reeve operated Electra propjets and 727 jets were both configured as combi aircraft and were capable of transporting mixed loads of passengers and freight on their respective main decks.

=== Cold War ===
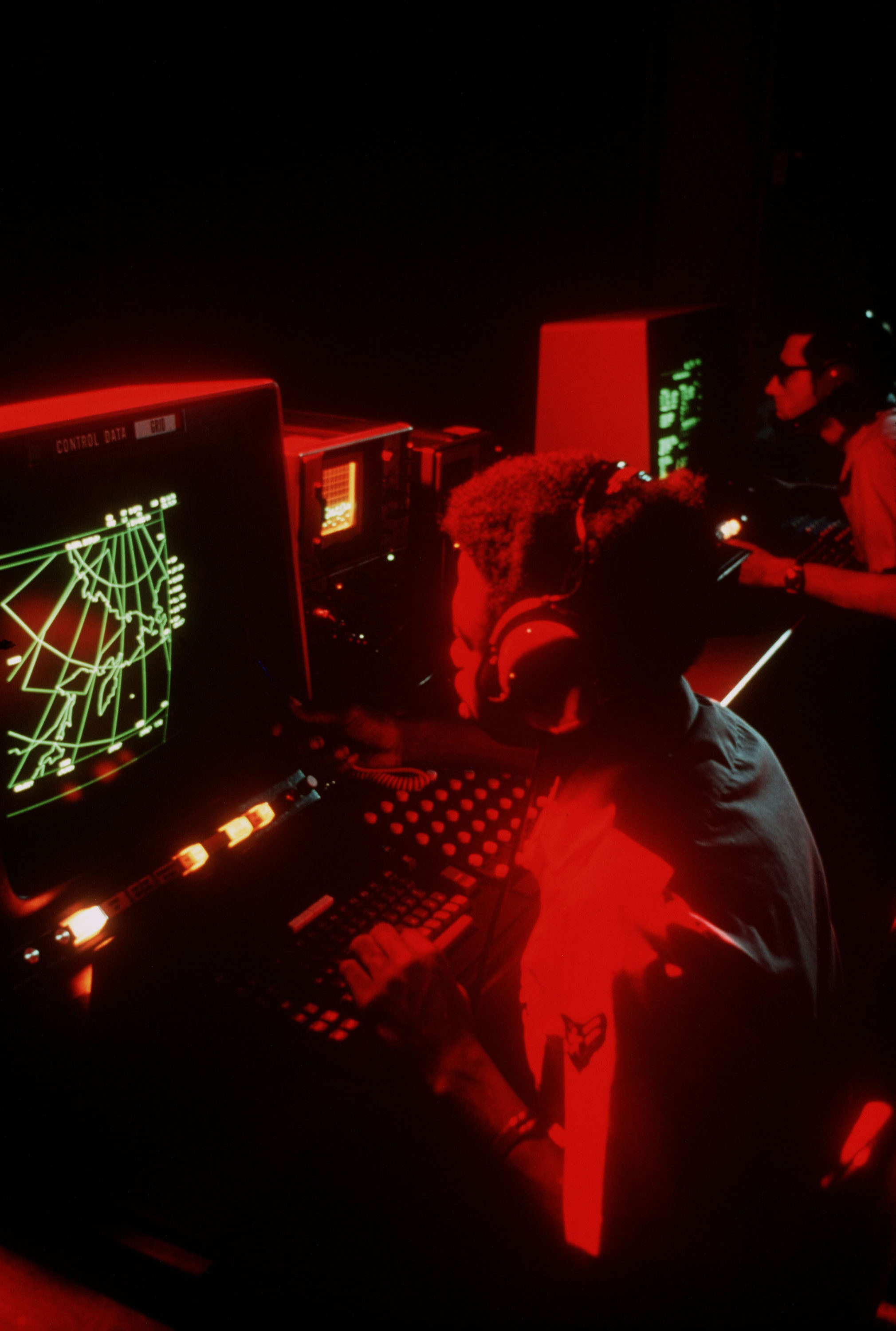
Displays for the COBRA DANE system, 1977

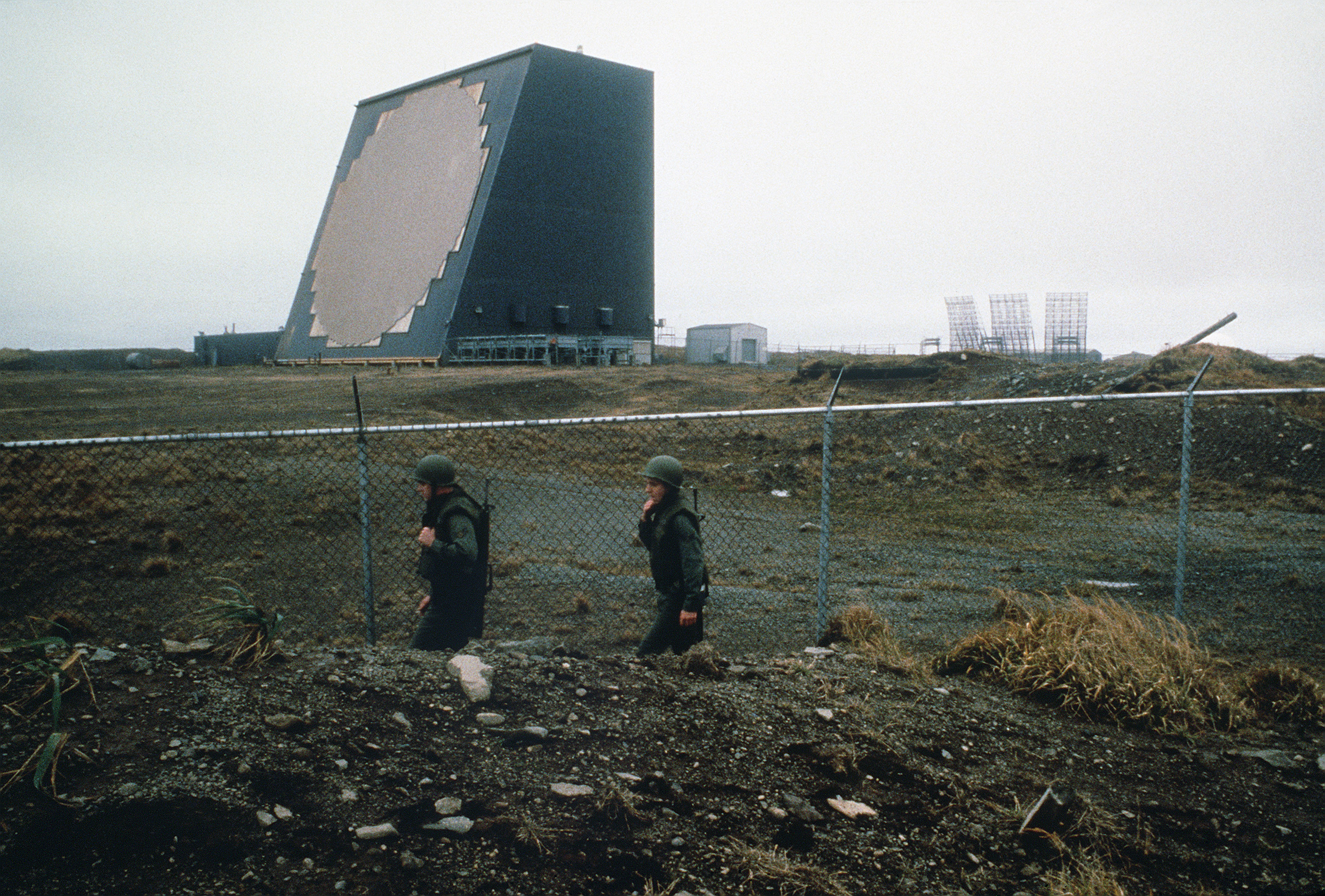
Security policemen patrol the area around the Cobra Dane radar in 1984. (Older AN/FPS-17 radar antennas appear in the background)

In 1958, the Air Force resumed operations on Shemya in support of various Air Force and Army strategic intelligence collection activities.

Shemya also continued to support the Great Circle Route for MATS and later Military Airlift Command transports between Japan and Elmendorf AFB. The 5040th Air Base Squadron was activated on 15 July 1958 to provide base support. The stations initial use was that of a long range weather station, with WB-50D Superfortresses being flown from the base by the MATS 7th Weather Group, Air Weather Service.

It also became a Strategic Air Command refueling site for B-52 Stratofortress bombers and KC-135 tankers as part of Operation Chrome Dome. SAC would have the tankers rotated to Shemya where they were re-fueled prior to taking off and refueling the loitering B-52s over Alaska which would loiter outside the Soviet Union to provide rapid first strike or retaliation capability in case of nuclear war. Shemya also supported various SAC Boeing RC-135 "Rivet" reconnaissance aircraft flying along the Soviet Pacific Coast with on-board sensors which enable the crew to detect, identify and geolocate signals throughout the electromagnetic spectrum.

The base host squadron was re-designated the 5073rd Air Base Squadron in October 1962, and upgraded to a group on 15 October 1974 in recognition of the number and complexities of the tenant units it supported. Shemya was re-designated from an Air Force Station to an Air Force Base on 21 June 1968.

In 1966 the Air Defense Command 9th Air Division assumed jurisdiction of the base. ADC organized the 16th Surveillance Squadron with AN/FPS-17 Detection and AN/FPS-80 Tracking Radars to monitor Soviet missile tests on the Kamchatka Peninsula and to support the Air Force Spacetrack System. Soviet fishing trawlers were a common sight in the offshore waters of the island, monitoring the squadron's activities.

In July 1973, Raytheon won a contract to build a system called COBRA DANE on Shemya. Cobra Dane replaced the AN/FPS-17 and AN/FPS-80 radars with a more powerful AN/FPS-108 phased-array radar. Cobra Dane was declared operational on 1 August 1977. Its primary mission is intelligence gathering in support of verification of the SALT II arms limitation agreement.

The station was also used by SAC Cobra Ball and other related projects which monitored missile-associated signals and tracks missiles during boost and re-entry phases to provide reconnaissance for treaty verification and theater ballistic missile proliferation. The aircraft used were extensively modified C-135Bs.

In August 1988, at least one Aries rocket was launched, relating to the Queen Match program, for anti-ballistic missile testing.

Jurisdiction of Shemya AFB was transferred from the Aerospace Defense Command to the Strategic Air Command when the former was inactivated on 1 October 1979. It was transferred to the Air Force Space Command on 1 May 1983. During the 1980s the facilities on Shemya were upgraded. Many of the old World War II structures were replaced with modern buildings and new facilities were built.

=== From 1992 ===
On 27 January 1992 the 5073rd Air Base Group located at Shemya AFB was re-designated as the 673d Air Base Group (673 ABG), subordinate to the Eleventh Air Force (11AF) of Pacific Air Forces (PACAF). The 673d and the base were subsequently reassigned from Eleventh Air Force to the 11th Air Control Wing (11 ACW). The Cobra Dane radar was integrated into the Joint-Service DOD Ballistic Missile Defense System (BMDS).

The air station also serves as a diversion airport for civilian aircraft which encounter an emergency while travelling across the Pacific Ocean.

- On 6 April 1993 China Eastern Airlines Flight 583 was authorized to make an emergency landing on the airbase. The staff of the airbase provided humanitarian aid to the passengers and crews of the flight, and transferred the wounded to Anchorage.
- On 1 July 1994, the 11th Air Control Wing was inactivated and the 673 ABG was reassigned back to Eleventh Air Force. The 673d Air Base Group provided base support to various tenant units assigned to other Air Force commands, such as the Air Force Space Command and other agencies involved in intelligence gathering activities directed by the National Command Authority.
- On 24 December 2018, Delta Air Lines Flight 128 from Beijing to Seattle diverted to Eareckson Air Station after pilots were alerted to a "potential engine issue". The diverted plane, a Boeing 767-300ER, spent about 12 hours at Eareckson Air Station before being ferried back to Seattle. Delta sent a replacement B767-300ER from Seattle to pick up the passengers which landed at Eareckson Air Station at 11:00.

=== Major commands to which assigned ===
- Eleventh Air Force, 23 May 1943
- Alaskan Air Command, 18 December 1945 – 1 July 1954; 15 July 1958
- Air (later Aerospace) Defense Command, 1 January 1967
- Strategic Air Command, 1 December 1979
- Air Force Space Command, 1 May 1983
- Pacific Air Forces, 27 January 1992 – present

=== Major units assigned ===
United States Army Air Forces

- HQ IX Bomber Command, 3–31 March 1944
- 28th Bombardment Group, 26 February 1944 – 20 October 1945
- 11th Fighter Squadron, 11 August 1945 – 15 August 1946 (P-38 Lightning)
- 54th Fighter Squadron, 18 October – 20 November 1943 (P-38 Lightning)
- 344th Fighter Squadron, 25 June 1943 – 15 August 1946 (P-38 Lightning)
- 21st Bombardment Squadron, 27 July – 19 September 1943 (B-24 Liberator)
- 404th Bombardment Squadron, 28 February 1944 – 5 January 1947 (B-24 Liberator)
- 343d Fighter Group, 5 October 1945 – 15 August 1946
- 626th Aircraft Control and Warning Squadron, 1946
- 66th Fighter Squadron, 15 August 1946 – 30 May 1947

United States Air Force

- 5021st Air Base Squadron, 1 March 1951

Re-designated: 5040th Air Base Squadron, 15 July 1958
Re-designated: 5073d Air Base Squadron, 1 October 1962
Re-designated: 5073d Air Base Group, 15 October 1974 – 27 January 1992

- 16th Surveillance Squadron, 1 January 1967

Re-designated: 16th Aerospace Surveillance Squadron, 3 January 1967 – 1 December 1979

- 673d Air Base Group, 27 January 1992 – 1 July 1994
- 611th Air Support Squadron, 1 July 1994 – present

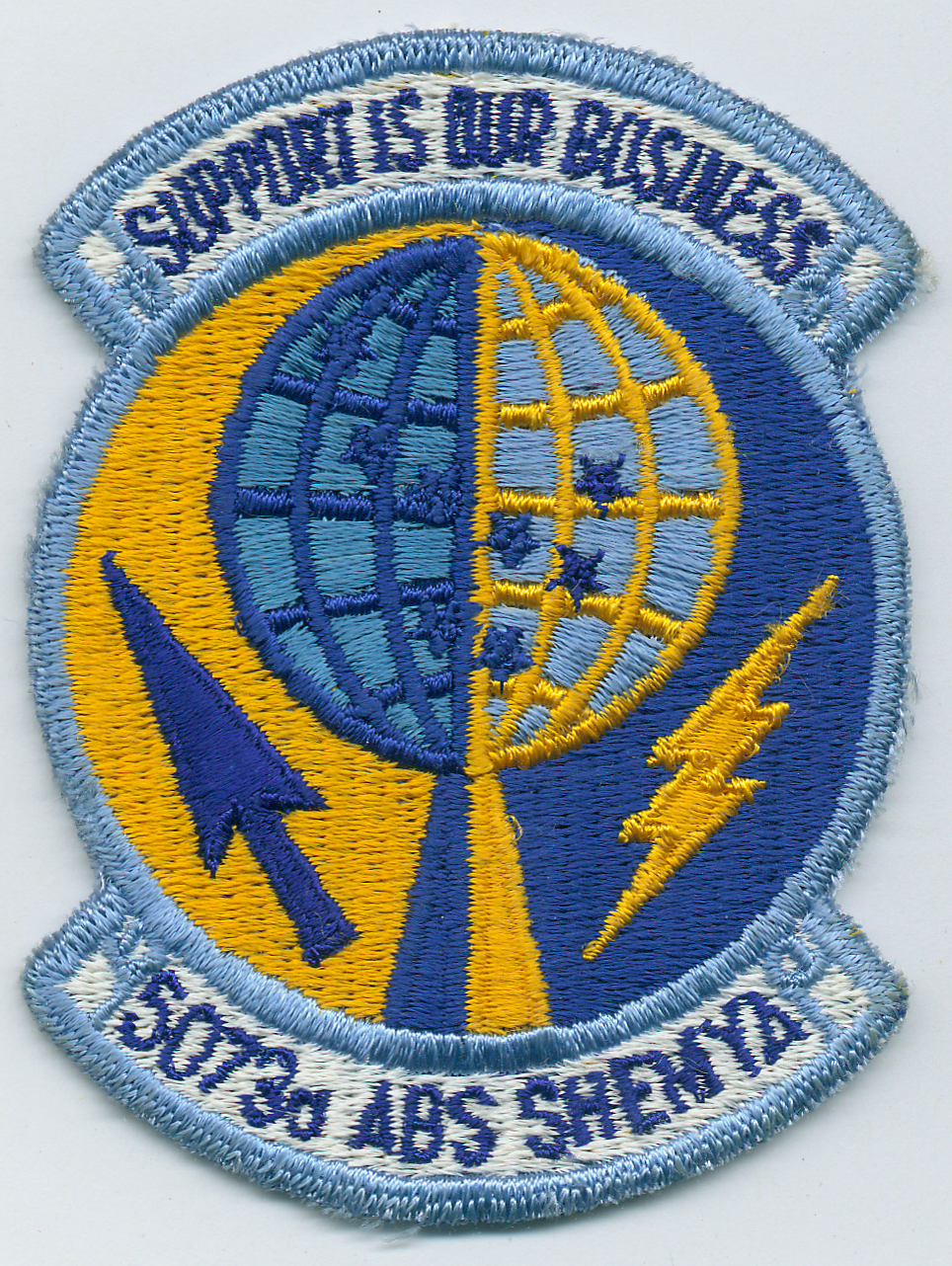
5073d ABS 1962–1974

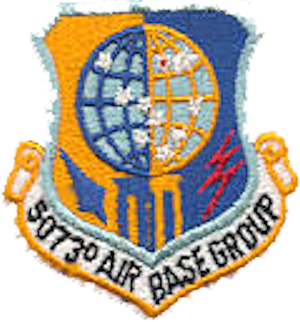
5073d ABG 1974–1992

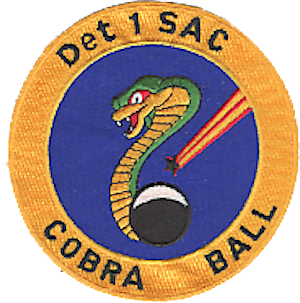
6th SW Detachment 1

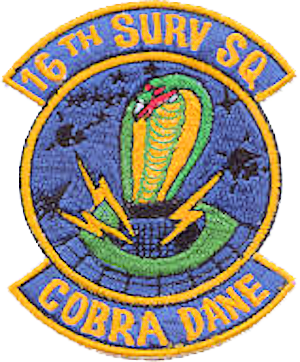
16th SS 1967–1979

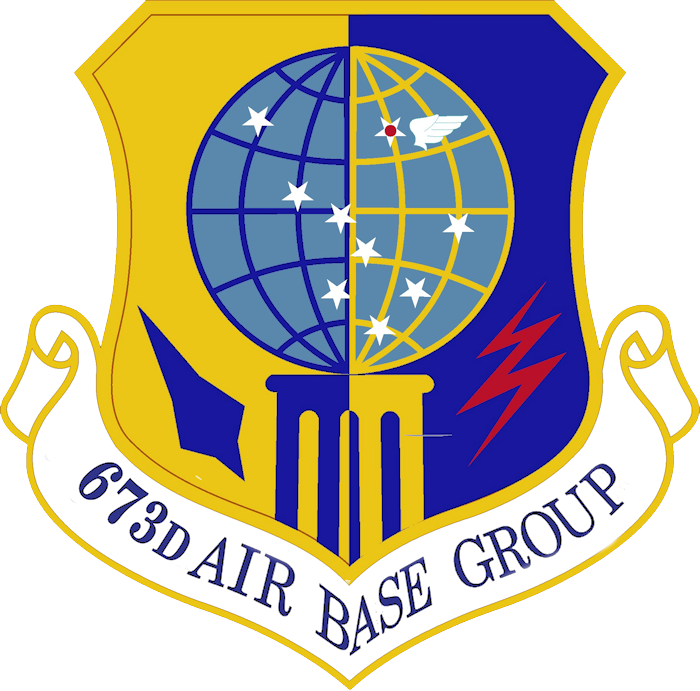
673d ABG 1992–1994

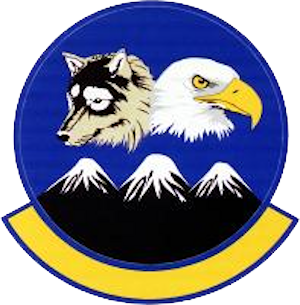
611th ASUS 1994 – present

== Accidents and incidents ==
- On 27 December 1957, a Royal Canadian Air Force North Star crashed during landing. The six crew and two passengers survived although the aircraft was written-off beyond repair.
- On 21 July 1961, a Douglas DC-6A, Alaska Airlines Flight 779, crashed at Shemya on a flight from Anchorage after the controller neglected to turn on the runway lights. All six on board were killed in the crash.
- On 13 January 1969, a Boeing RC-135S, serial 59–1491, ran off the end of the runway and broke up. There were no fatalities, but the aircraft was a total loss.
- On 5 June 1969, Boeing RC-135E serial number 62–4137, operating out of Shemya AFB, went down in the Bering Sea.
- On 15 March 1981, another RC-135 crashed while on approach to Shemya AFB in poor weather. Six of the twenty-four crew on board were killed.
- On 31 July 1983, Lockheed C-5A Galaxy 70–0446, was severely damaged when it landed short of the runway, bounced into the air and crashed on the runway. There were no fatalities, but the aircraft was severely damaged. After repairs, it was approved for a one-time ferry flight back to the mainland for a complete overhaul.
- On 6 April 1993, China Eastern Airlines Flight 583, a McDonnell Douglas MD-11, made an emergency landing at Shemya after slats were accidentally deployed in mid-air, causing severe oscillations. Sixty crew members and passengers were hospitalised, and two ultimately died.
- On 29 July 2015, Cathay Pacific Flight 884 from Hong Kong to Los Angeles, a Boeing 777-300ER, made an emergency landing at the air base after a cooling fan in the cargo hold failed, creating smoke in the cockpit. The crew was initially preparing for a water landing in case there was a real fire, but the aircraft continued to Eareckson/Shemya to make an emergency landing there.
- On 24 December 2018, Delta Air Lines Flight 128 from Beijing to Seattle carrying 194 passengers landed safely on Shemya Island due to engine issues. The diverted aircraft was a 767-300ER, registration number N1612T.
- On 14 March 2020, Polar Air Cargo Flight 717, from Los Angeles to Tokyo landed on Shemya Island due to a suspected fire on board. The flight operated by a 747-400F, initially diverted to Petropavlovsk-Kamchatsky, Russia, but had to divert again to Shemya due to poor weather in Petropavlovsk.

== Demographics ==
Eareckson Station
- Census-designated place
- Location within Alaska Location within the United States
- Coordinates: 52°43′16″N 174°06′26″E
- Country: United States
- State: Alaska
- Unorganized Borough: Aleutians West Census Area

Government
  - State senator: Lyman Hoffman (D)
  - State rep.: Bryce Edgmon (I)
- Time zone: UTC-9 (Alaska (AKST))
  - Summer (DST): UTC-8 (AKDT)

Eareckson Station is a census-designated place (CDP) covering the residential population of Eareckson Air Station on the island of Shemya in the Aleutians West Census Area, Alaska, United States. The population at the 2020 Census was 232.

Historical population
Census	Pop.	Note	%±
1960	124		—
1970	1,131		812.1%
1980	600		−46.9%
2020	232		—
U.S. Decennial Census

It first appeared as Shemya Air Force Base in the United States Census from 1960 to 1980. As Shemya in 1960 (an unincorporated military base) and as Shemya (Air Force) Station in 1970. In 1980, it was made a census-designated place (CDP). It was dissolved as a CDP in 1990 and did not report separately again until 2020 as Eareckson Station CDP.

=== 2020 census ===
Eareckson Station CDP, Alaska – Racial and ethnic composition Note: the US Census treats Hispanic/Latino as an ethnic category. This table excludes Latinos from the racial categories and assigns them to a separate category. Hispanics/Latinos may be of any race.
Race / Ethnicity (NH = Non-Hispanic)	Pop 2020	% 2020
White alone (NH)	169	72.84%
Black or African American alone (NH)	24	10.34%
Native American or Alaska Native alone (NH)	0	0.00%
Asian alone (NH)	6	2.59%
Native Hawaiian or Pacific Islander alone (NH)	8	3.45%
Other race alone (NH)	0	0.00%
Mixed race or Multiracial (NH)	1	0.43%
Hispanic or Latino (any race)	24	10.34%
Total	232	100.00%

== See also ==
- Alaska World War II Army Airfields
- List of United States Air Force installations
