= Alexai Point Army Airfield =

World War II airfield on Attu Island, Alaska, U.S.

Alexai Point Army Airfield
- Part of Eleventh Air Force
- Attu Island, Alaska

Site information
- Type: Military Airfield
- Controlled by: United States Army Air Forces
- Condition: Abandoned

Location
- Coordinates: 52°48′51″N 173°17′51″E

Site history
- Built: 1943
- In use: 1943-1946
- Battles/wars: Aleutian Islands Campaign

Alexai Point Army Airfield is an abandoned World War II airfield with two runways laid across Alexai Point on Attu Island, Alaska. The remains of the Seabee built airbase are located about 4 miles east of the closed Casco Cove Coast Guard Station, directly across Massacre Bay.

== History ==
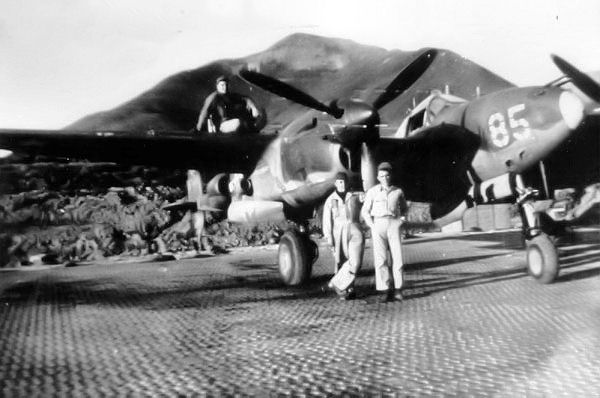
P-38 on the Marsden Matting

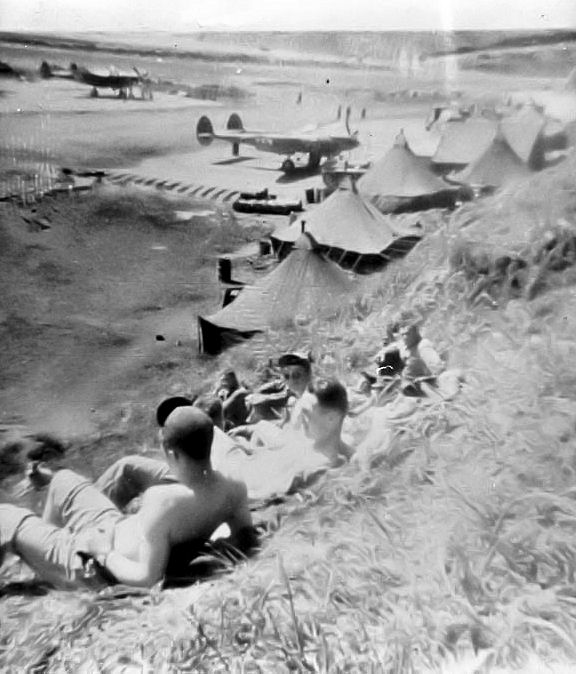
P-38s at Alexi Point. Note the tents on the hill above the parking ramp

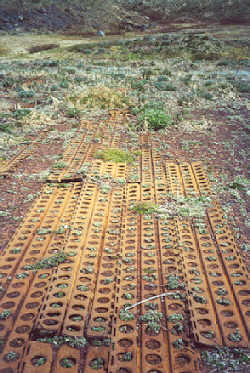
Photo of the site as of 2006

On the morning of 11 May 1943, American forces went ashore on Japanese-occupied Attu in the Aleutian Islands. The Japanese, who knew the Americans were coming, had pulled back from their shoreline positions and moved to defensive positions on higher ground above the fog.

On 30 May 1943, before the battle for Attu was completely over, the building of Alexai Point Airfield was initiated using Marsden Matting to pave the runways. Navy Seabees also began construction of an airfield at Casco Cove for Naval Air units. Also, on 28 May, a small detachment of Alaskan Scouts began reconnaissance of Shemya, a small, flat, uninhabited island 35 miles to the east of Attu. The following day, Army Engineers came ashore on Shemya to begin construction of another, much longer runway suitable for bombers.

The first landing at Alexai Point Airfield was made by an Eleventh Air Force C-47 arriving on 8 June 1943 to deliver fighter crews to Alexai Point, and to evacuate wounded soldiers. Shortly afterwards, P-40 Warhawks from the 344th Fighter Squadron arrived to provide air cover over the island.

USAAF units assigned to Alexai Point Army Airfield were:

- 18th Fighter Squadron, March 28, 1944 – November 6, 1945 (P-38 Lightning)
- 54th Fighter Squadron, November 20, 1943- March 8, 1946 (P-38 Lightning)
- 344th Fighter Squadron, June 12 - December 1943 (P-40 Warhawk)
- 77th Bombardment Squadron, July–September 1943; Feb 11, 1944-October 19, 1945 (B-25 Mitchell, B-26 Marauder)

Initially used for carrying out bombardment operations over Kiska Island during June and July 1943, Alexai Point and the new Shemya Army Airfield became forward bases for operations against the Kurile Islands of northern Japan, after the end of the Aleutian Islands Campaign in late August. Alexai Point became home of very long-range (VLR) P-38 Lightning squadrons, providing fighter escort for B-24 Liberators bombers based at Shemya. By mid-July fighters from Alexai Point Airfield had made their first strike against Japan, a raid against the northern Kuril Islands.

With the end of the war in 1945, combat units were gradually withdrawn; the 11th Weather Squadron and the 713th Air Warning Radar Squadron remained until June 1946 when the base was closed. The facility was abandoned, with most structures dismantled, the usable buildings being reassembled at Naval Air Station Attu.

Today many revetments, roads, anti-aircraft gun emplacements and the remains of the runways and taxiways remain, abandoned for almost seventy years.

== Accidents and incidents ==
On January 1, 1945, 2nd Lt. Robert L. Nesmith flying from Alexai Point, crashed his Lockheed P-38G-10-LO Lightning in Temnac Valley, just west of Attu Station while on a low-level training mission over Attu. The aircraft was nominated to be added to the National Register of Historic Places but instead was recovered in 1999 and static-restored for display at Elmendorf AFB.

== See also ==
- Alaska World War II Army Airfields
