= 904th Expeditionary Air Refueling Squadron =

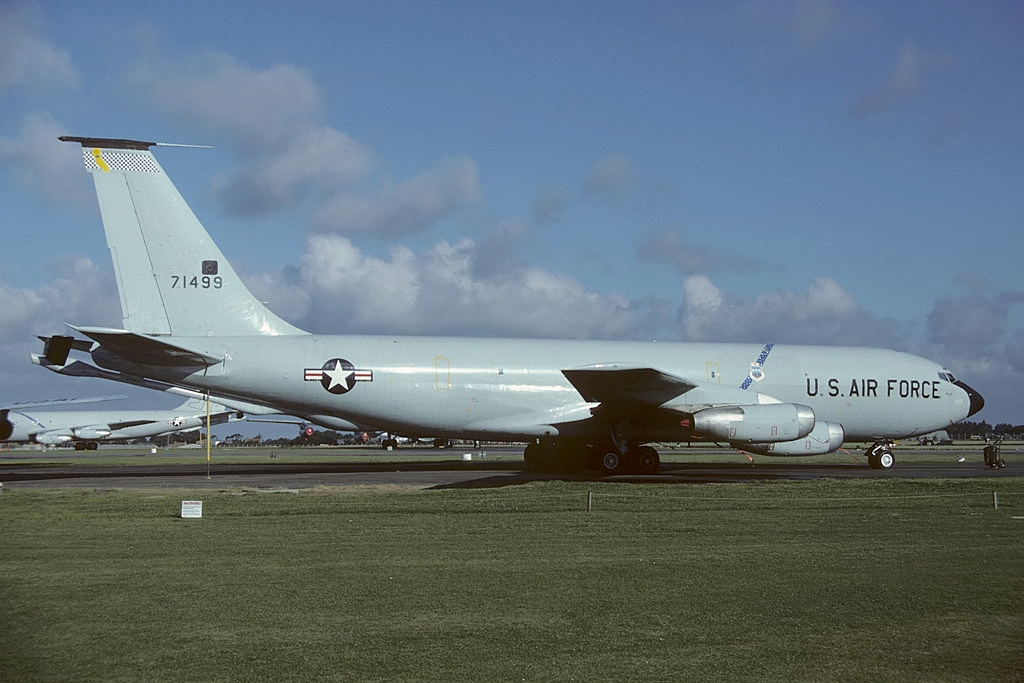
- KC-135A Stratotanker of the 904th Air Refueling Squadron
- Active: 1940–1947; 1959–1989
- Country: United States
- Branch: United States Air Force
- Role: Air Refueling
- Engagements: American Theater of World War II; Pacific Theater of Operations
- Decorations: Distinguished Unit Citation; Air Force Outstanding Unit Award

Insignia
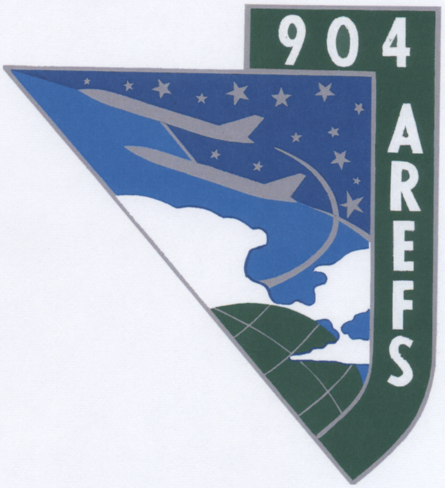
- 904th Air Refueling Squadron emblem (Note: Approved 19 April 1960.)

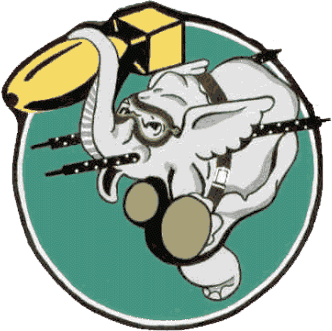
- 404th Bombardment Squadron emblem (Note: Approved 21 November 1942. Over and through a light green disc, bordure black, piped white, a caricatured white elephant running, trimmed black, black belt about the waist, holding two machine guns pointing to rear, grasping a large yellow aerial bomb upraised in trunk, having two black machine guns for tusks and ears in shape of wings, soles of hind feet brown.)

The 904th Expeditionary Air Refueling Squadron is an inactive United States Air Force unit. It was last assigned to the 320th Bombardment Wing at Mather Air Force Base, California, where it was inactivated on 30 September 1986.

The squadron was first activated in January 1941 as the 14th Reconnaissance Squadron, which participated in anti-submarine warfare patrols after the Japanese attack on Pearl Harbor in the Gulf of Mexico before being redesignated the 404th Bombardment Squadron and moving to Alaska to participate in combat in the Aleutian Islands, where it earned a Distinguished Unit Citation. After the war, the squadron remained in Alaska until it was inactivated in 1947.

The 904th Air Refueling Squadron was activated at Mather in 1959 and provided air refueling support for its wing's Boeing B-52 Stratofortresses and other USAF aircraft until it was inactivated in 1989. In 1985 the two squadrons were consolidated into a single unit.

In 2002, the consolidated squadron was converted to provisional status as the 904th Expeditionary Air Refueling Squadron and assigned to Air Mobility Command. There have been no known deployments of the squadron as an expeditionary unit.

== History ==
=== World War II ===
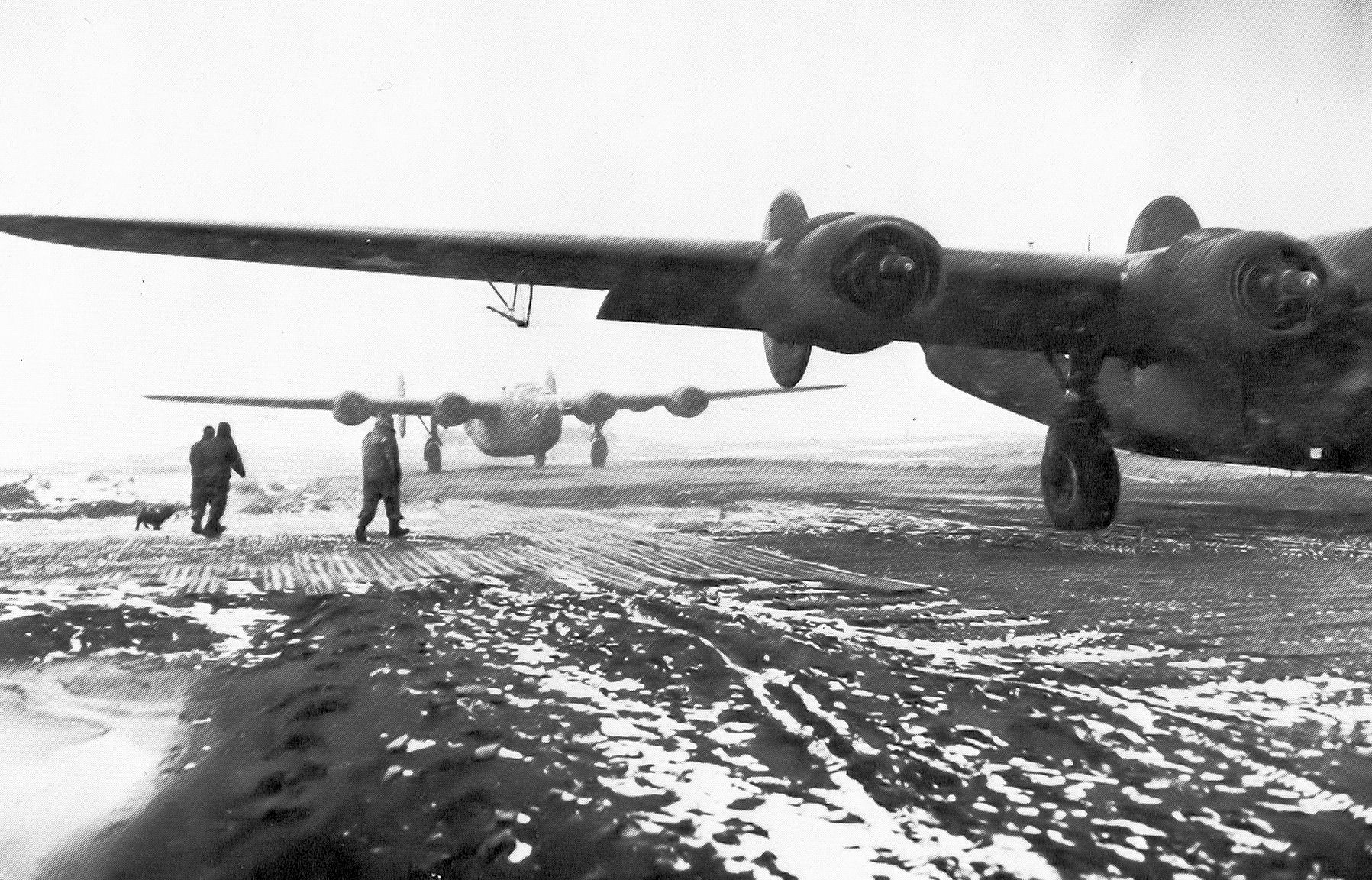
404th Bomb Squadron B-24s at Shemya AAF

The squadron was first activated in January 1941 as the 14th Reconnaissance Squadron (Heavy) in the Southeast Air District at Miami Municipal Airport and attached to the 44th Bombardment Group. Since a reorganization of General Headquarters Air Force in September 1936, each bombardment group of the Army Air Forces (AAF) had an assigned or attached reconnaissance squadron, which operated the same aircraft as that group's assigned bombardment squadrons. That arrangement continued for units like the 14th that were designated as heavy bombardment units. The squadron was equipped with Consolidated B-24 Liberators. In June the squadron moved to MacDill Field, Florida, where the 44th Group and its three assigned squadrons were located. Following the Japanese attack on Pearl Harbor, the squadron began to participate in antisubmarine patrols.

In May 1942, the squadron was redesignated the 404th Bombardment Squadron and assigned to the 44th Group. As the rest of the 44th Group, which had been acting as an Operational Training Unit began intensive training for deployment to the European Theater of Operations, the squadron was detached from the 44th and sent to reinforce the 28th Composite Group in Alaska in July 1942.

The squadron's 1942 move to Alaska in July 1942 was in response to the Japanese invasion of the Aleutian Islands. It flew long-range bombardment missions of enemy targets in the Aleutians during 1942 and 1943. The following year it attacked the Kuril Islands, for which it was awarded the Distinguished Unit Citation. The squadron remained in Alaska after Japanese forces were driven from the Aleutians. In late 1944, Eleventh Air Force modified two B-24D aircraft for ferret missions. These aircraft were assigned to the 404th, although mission tasking was performed directly by the Eleventh Air Force Signal Office. Ferret missions began in January 1945, and one of these aircraft was lost on a mission on 1 May 1945. The squadron continued to fly long-range reconnaissance operations from Shemya Army Air Base until it was inactivated in 1947.

=== Cold War ===
The 904th Air Refueling Squadron, Heavy was activated on 1 March 1959 by Strategic Air Command (SAC) at Mather Air Force Base, California, as the air refueling component of the 4134th Strategic Wing. Operating Boeing KC-135 Stratotankers, it provided air refueling support to the B-52 Stratofortress strategic bombers of its parent wing and other USAF units as directed. The squadron transferred to the 320th Bombardment Wing in 1963 when SAC replaced its Major Command controlled (MAJCON) strategic wings with Air Force controlled (AFCON) bombardment wings that inherited the honors earned by World War II bombardment groups.

The 904th deployed to the western Pacific region to support combat operations of deployed SAC units and tactical aircraft over Southeast Asia during the Vietnam War between 1966 and 1969. The squadron earned two Air Force Outstanding Unit Awards during the 1960s. In 1985, the 904th and the 404th Bombardment Squadron were consolidated when the United States Air Force combined inactive units that had served in World War II with squadrons that had been established after the war ended. The squadron was inactivated with its parent wing in 1989 when the B-52G was retired. Its equipment and personnel were reassigned to other units.

In 2002, the squadron was converted to provisional status and assigned to Air Mobility Command as the 904th Expeditionary Air Refueling Squadron.

== Lineage ==
404th Bombardment Squadron

- Constituted as the 14th Reconnaissance Squadron (Heavy) on 20 November 1940

Activated on 15 January 1941
Redesignated 404th Bombardment Squadron (Heavy) on 22 April 1942
Redesignated 404th Bombardment Squadron, Heavy in 1944
Inactivated on 5 January 1947

- Consolidated with the 904th Air Refueling Squadron as the 904th Air Refueling Squadron on 19 September 1985

904th Air Refueling Squadron

Constituted as the 904th Air Refueling Squadron, Heavy on 9 February 1959
Activated on 1 March 1959

- Consolidated with the 404th Bombardment Squadron on 19 September 1985

Inactivated on 1 October 1989
Redesignated 904th Expeditionary Air Refueling Squadron and converted to provisional status on 12 June 2002

=== Assignments ===
- Southeast Air District, 15 January 1941 (attached to 44th Bombardment Group)
- 44th Bombardment Group, 25 February 1942 (air echelon attached to 28th Composite Group after c. 12 July 1942)
- 28th Composite Group (later 28th Bombardment Group) c. 21 September 1942
- Eleventh Air Force (later Alaskan Air Command), 20 October 1945 – 5 January 1947
- 4134th Strategic Wing, 1 March 1959
- 320th Bombardment Wing, 1 February 1963 – 1 October 1989
- Air Mobility Command to activate or inactivate anytime after 12 June 2002

=== Stations ===
- Miami Municipal Airport, Florida, 15 January 1941
- MacDill Field, Florida, 11 June 1941
- Barksdale Field, Louisiana, 7 February 1942

Operated from Ladd Field, Alaska Territory, beginning 12 July 1942
Operated from Marks Army Airfield, Alaska Territory, beginning c. 18 July 1942

- Will Rogers Field, Oklahoma, 25 July 1942

Operated from Fort Glenn Army Airfield, Alaska Territory, after 24 August 1942

- Fort Lewis, Washington, 30 August 1942 – 10 September 1942

Operated from Adak Army Airfield, Alaska Territory, after 13 September 1942

- Elmendorf Field, Alaska Territory, 21 September 1942
- Adak Army Airfield, Alaska Territory, 22 March 1943

Operated from Amchitka Army Airfield, Alaska Territory after 4 June 1943

- Shemya Army Air Base, Alaska Territory c. 26 February 1944 – 5 January 1947
- Mather Air Force Base, California, 1 March 1959 – 1 October 1986

=== Aircraft ===
- Consolidated B-24 Liberator, 1941–1947
- Boeing KC-135 Stratotanker, 1959–1986

=== Awards and campaigns ===
Award streamer	Award	Dates	Notes
	Distinguished Unit Citation	1 April 1944 – 13 August 1945	404th Bombardment Group, Kuril Islands
	Air Force Outstanding Unit Award	18 June 1965 – 31 July 1965	904th Air Refueling Squadron
	Air Force Outstanding Unit Award	2 March 1966-1 April 1966	904th Air Refueling Squadron

== See also ==
- List of United States Air Force air refueling squadrons
- B-24 Liberator units of the United States Army Air Forces
