= 344th Fighter Squadron =

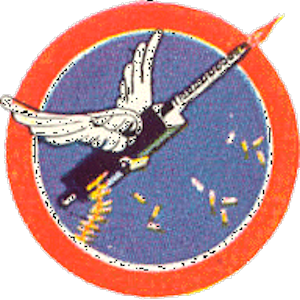
- Official emblem of the 344th Fighter Squadron
- Active: 1942-1946
- Country: United States
- Branch: United States Air Force
- Type: Fighter

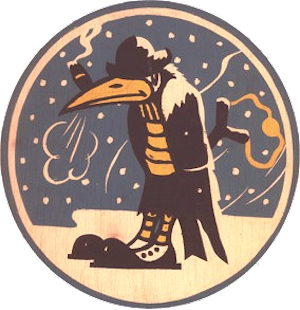
Alternate squadron emblem

The 344th Fighter Squadron is an inactive United States Air Force unit. Its last assignment was with 343d Fighter Group stationed at Shemya Army Airfield, Alaska Territory.

== History ==
Activated as a P-40 Warhawk fighter squadron in Alaska during World War II. Engaged in combat missions during Aleutian Campaign, 1942–1943. Switched to long-range P-38 Lightning fighters in 1944 and flew long-range attacks against Japanese shipping and airfields in northern Japan from its base at Shemya. Inactivated in 1946.

=== Lineage ===
- Constituted 344th Fighter Squadron on 2 Oct 1942

Activated on 10 Oct 1942
Inactivated on 15 Aug 1946.

=== Assignments ===
- 343d Fighter Group, 10 Oct 1942 – 15 Aug 1946

=== Stations ===
- Elmendorf Field, Alaska Territory, 10 Oct 1942

Detachment at Fort Randall Army Airfield, Alaska Territory, 12 Nov 1942

- Fort Randall Army Airfield, Alaska Territory, c. 25 Dec 1942
- Fort Glenn Army Airfield, Alaska Territory, 8 Mar-c. 23 May 1943

Detachment at Amchitka Army Airfield, Alaska Territory, May-Jul 1943
Detachment at Alexai Point Army Airfield, Attu, Alaska Territory, c. 12 Jun – Dec 1943

- Shemya Army Airfield, Alaska Territory, 25 Jun 1943 – 15 Aug 1946.

=== Aircraft ===
- P-40 Warhawk, 1942–1944
- P-38 Lightning, 1944–1946
