= Fort Glenn Army Air Base =

Former US Army Air Forces airfield on Adak Island, Alaska

Cape Air Force Base Fort Glenn Army Airfield Cape Field at Fort Glenn
- Part of Eleventh Air Force
- Umnak, Alaska

Site information
- Type: Military Airbase
- Controlled by: United States Army Air Forces

Location
- Coordinates: 53°22′39″N 167°53′24″W

Site history
- In use: 1942-1950
- Battles/wars: Aleutian Islands campaign

Cape Air Force Base also known as Fort Glenn Army Air Base, is a site significant for its role in World War II fighting, operating alongside Naval Air Facility Otter Point.

It was listed on the National Register of Historic Places and declared a National Historic Landmark in 1987 as Cape Field at Fort Glenn.

== History ==
=== Origins ===
Because of the perceived vulnerability of Alaska immediately following the Pearl Harbor Attack, additional Army Air Corps units were authorized by General Henry H. Arnold for Alaska and plans were made to send modern aircraft to the Territory to replace the obsolete aircraft assigned. However, the Alaskan Air Force had few airfields to accommodate the additional aircraft and units being assigned.

Along with new airfields on the mainland and Southwest Alaska, new air bases were planned for the air defense of the Aleutians to Dutch Harbor. Construction of the new bases on Umnak and Cold Bay began in January 1942 in secret, with construction reportedly disguised as a cannery. Originally, the equipment was supposed to construct McGrath Army Airbase, but the ground had frozen by the time that the equipment arrived. The first United States Army engineers landed at what would become Fort Glenn Army Air Base on 17 January and construction began by the end of the month. A Naval airfield, Naval Air Facility Otter Point, was adjacent to the Army Airbase. The 807th Engineering Battalion (Aviation) was brought in from Yukat to perform the construction along with a detachment of the Navy Seabee 8th Construction Battalion.

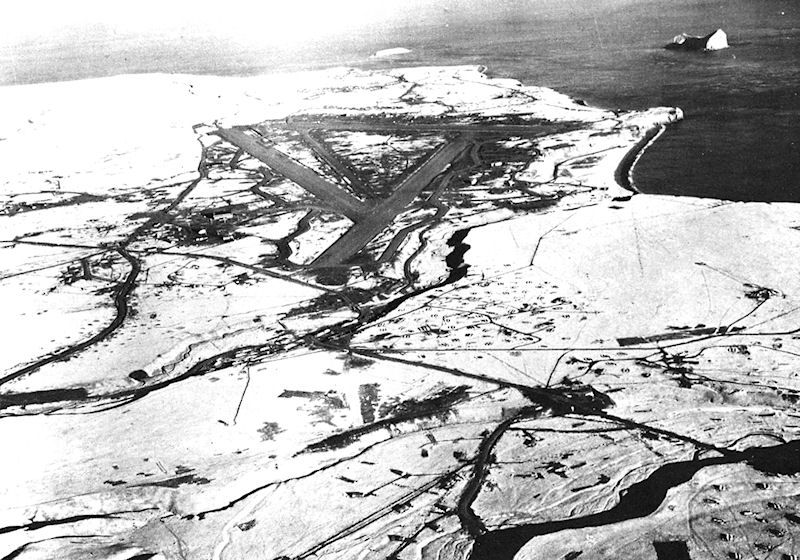
Cape Field, later Fort Glenn Army Air Base, was secretly built at Otter Point on Umnak Island in 1942.

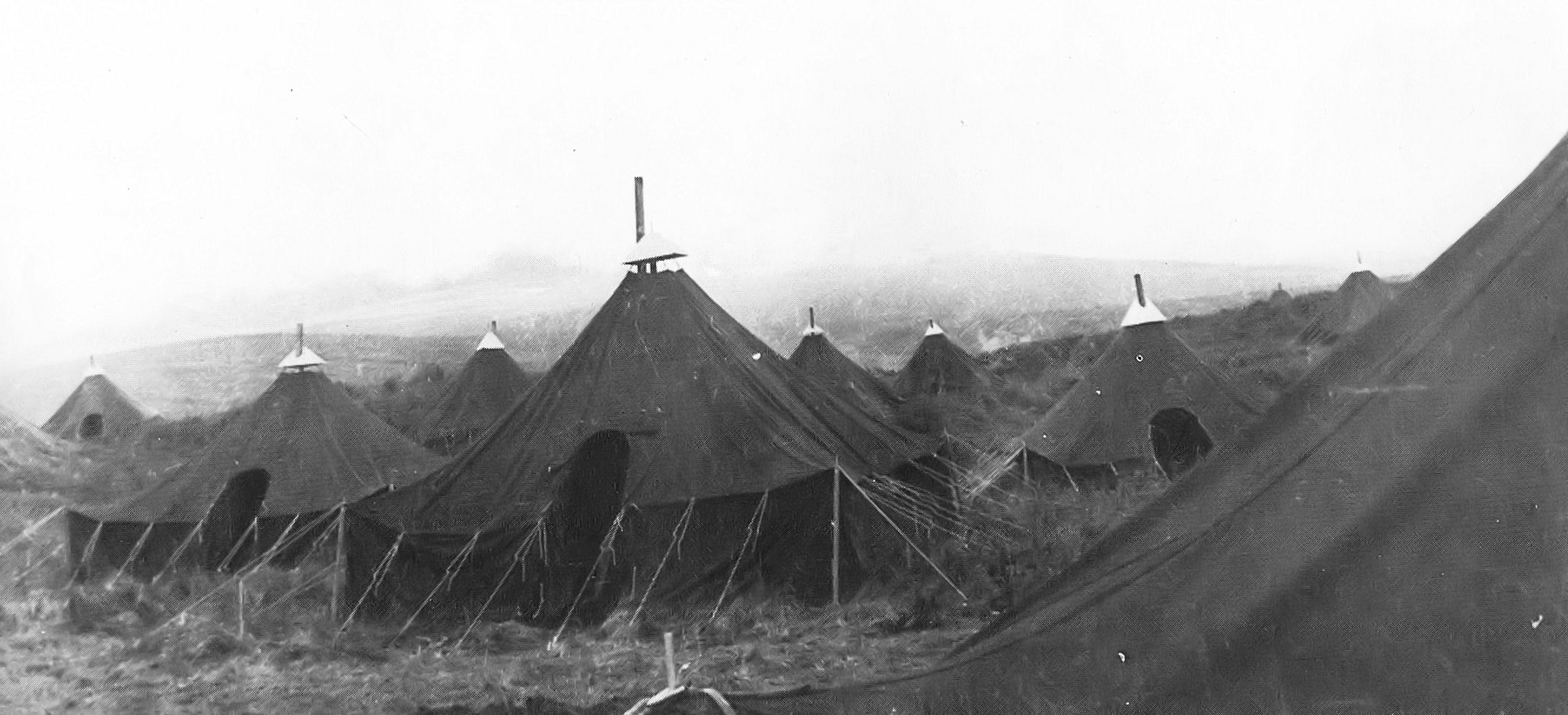
Personnel tents at Fort Glenn Army Air Base, May 1942

Plans called for three hard-surfaced runways (four were eventually built), but time was of the essence in the construction of the base, as the air defense of Dutch Harbor was dependent on them. Instead of a hard surface, engineers chose to use a new material, pierced steel planking (PSP), which could be laid down quickly over a compressed gravel subsurface to provide the airfield with an all-weather capability. 80,000 pieces of matting needed to be barged to the island. Construction crews worked in three shifts, 24 hours a day laying down the runways and constructing a rudimentary support station, water and sewer lines, an electrical grid, communications, fuel and munitions storage sites and all the other necessities to convert a remote island site into an operational airfield capable of supporting heavy bombers. A 5,000-foot (1,500 m) PSP runway was completed on 5 April although a C-53 was the first plane to land on the field, on 31 March. The main runway was officially opened on 23 May. Fort Glenn's first runway was then the U.S. Army's most westerly airfield in the Aleutian Islands."

The first operational unit, the 11th Fighter Squadron, moved into Fort Glenn with P-40 Warhawk fighters on 26 May from Elmendorf Field. Additional construction continued throughout 1942 with four 5,000-foot (1,500 m) × 175-foot (53 m) runways were completed (06/24, 07/35), two of which (03/21, 04/22) were situated only 10 degrees apart. All runways had four layers of asphalt laid down over the PSP. Two additional emergency landing fields were built, one on the north coast of the island (North Shore) 53°30′45″N 167°55′18″W, 9.4 miles north; the other 7.7 miles to the west-southwest of the base near the Tullk Volcano (Pacifier) 53°19′35″N 168°03′23″W.

Morrison-Knudsen Construction Company built hundreds of Quonset hut structures on the base, replacing the temporary tents which exposed the construction crews to the sudden storms which swept the island frequently. Housing and messing facilities for 119 officers and 359 men were constructed as well as recreational and service buildings. Storage facilities consisted of 6,975 square feet for general stores and a 150-cubic-foot freezer. Buildings for aircraft included a kodiak-type hangar, 160-foot (49 m) x 90-foot (27 m), a squadron warehouse, and a terminal for air transport service. Administration offices were housed in five buildings with a total floor space of 3,850 square feet. Radio facilities included a transmitting station, a direction-finder station, and a radar station, all with separate power houses, and with housing and messing provisions for personnel. The hospital, located in one small building, contained eight beds. The maintenance force of the station was installed in seven buildings. Electric power was provided by three diesel-electric generators.

=== Aleutian Islands campaign ===
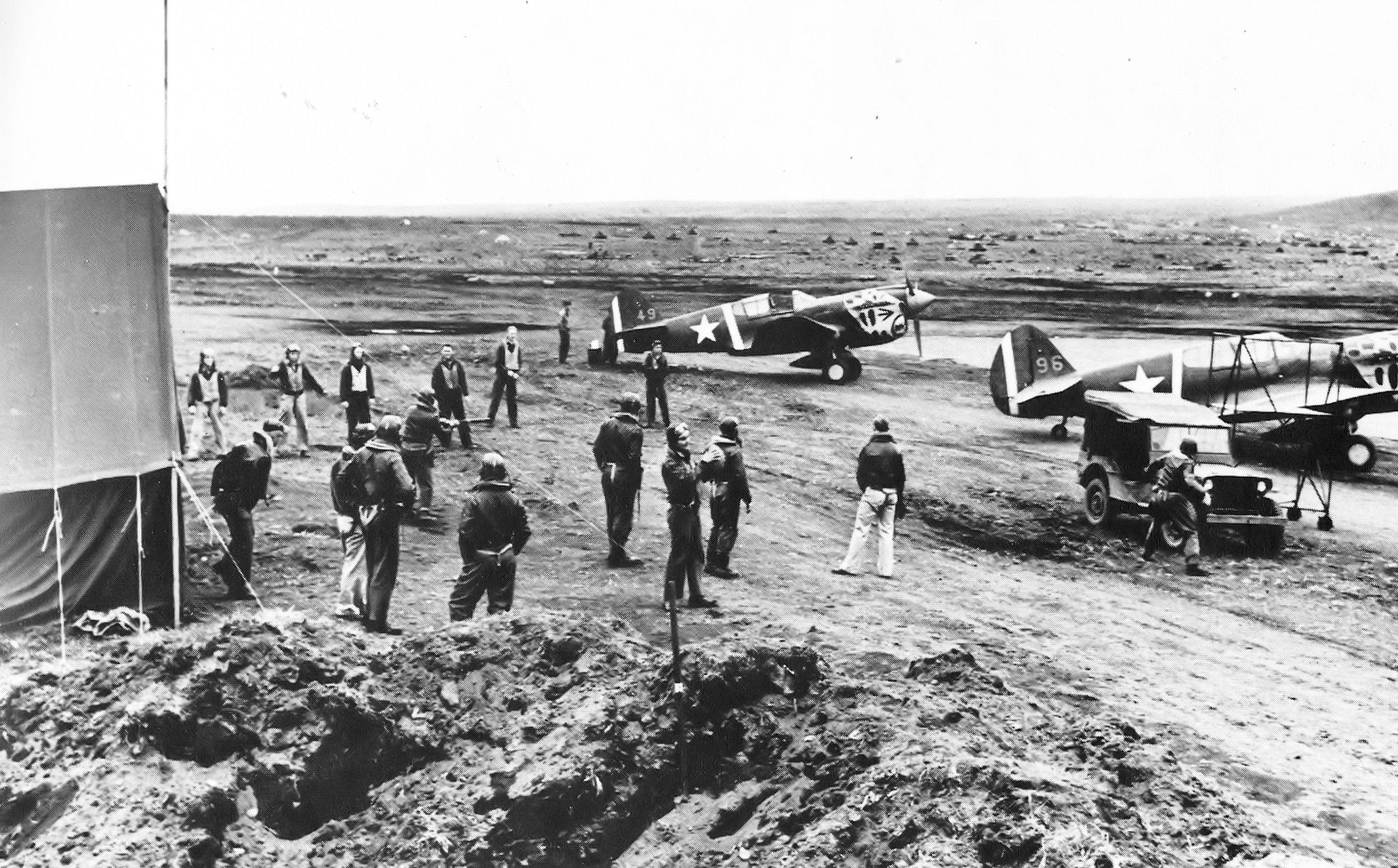
11th Fighter Squadron P-40 Warhawks at Fort Glenn AAB, June 1942

On 3 June 1942 the Imperial Japanese Navy launched two aircraft carrier raids on the United States Army barracks and the US Navy base at Dutch Harbor on nearby Amaknak Island. The attack was a surprise, but the base had been on alert for an attack for many days, although there was no specific warning of the attack before the Japanese planes arrived over Dutch Harbor. The attack signaled the beginning of the Aleutian Islands campaign. In response, the P-40s of the 11th Fighter Squadron from Fort Glenn AAB along with Naval land-based fighters attacked the Japanese aircraft. Eleventh Air Force also dispatched aircraft from Elmendorf Field. In the ensuring battle, the United States Navy lost four PBYs, and Eleventh AF lost one B-17, two B-26s and one LB-30 (B-24A) bombers and two P-40 fighters. The Japanese lost two A6M "Zero" fighters, and possibly a third due to ground anti-aircraft fire. One A6M "Zero", three D3A "Val" dive bombers and one E8N "Dave"reconnaissance seaplane were shot down in aerial combat.

Eleventh Air Force also dispatched Martin B-26 Marauder medium bombers of the 77th Bombardment Squadron. They arrived at about noon to locate the Japanese aircraft carriers and counterattack; however, they landed at Fort Glenn about 1:30pm due to fog and low visibility. The Marauders were carrying airborne torpedoes, rather than contact bombs which they were designed to carry. In addition to the Dutch Harbor attack, Japanese forces landed on Kiska Island on 6 June; Attu Island on 7 June, seizing both.

The Japanese attacks on Dutch Harbor, however, inflicted only minor damage on the base, which were quickly repaired. The mission of Fort Glen Army Air Base was changed to serve as the initial forward base to launch bombing attacks against the Japanese forces in the Aleutians. Known Air Force units deployed to Fort Glenn were:

- 28th Bombardment Group

21st Bombardment Squadron, LB-30 Liberator

Assigned to Hamilton Field, California, TDY to Fort Glenn AAB beginning 11 June 1942
Assigned to Fort Glenn AAB, 3 September 1942-19 September 1943

36th Bombardment Squadron, Boeing B-17E Flying Fortress, LB-30 Liberator

Assigned to Elmendorf Field, Alaska Territory, TDY to Fort Glenn AAB beginning 4 June 1942-1 May 1943

73d Bombardment Squadron, North American B-25 Mitchell

Assigned to Elmendorf Field, Alaska Territory, TDY to Fort Glenn AAB beginning June 1942
Assigned to Fort Glenn AAB, April–June 1943

77th Bombardment Squadron, B-25 Mitchell, Martin B-26 Marauder

Assigned to Elmendorf Field, Alaska Territory, TDY to Fort Glenn AAB beginning 30 May-3 October 1942

404th Bombardment Squadron, Consolidated B-24 Liberator

Assigned to Will Rogers Field, Oklahoma, TDY to Fort Glenn AAB beginning 24 August-13 September 1942

- 343d Fighter Group

11th Fighter Squadron, Curtiss P-40 Warhawk

Assigned to Elmendorf Field, Alaska Territory, TDY to Fort Glenn AAB beginning 26 May–June 1942
Assigned to Fort Glenn AAB, June 1942-20 February 1943

54th Fighter Squadron, P-40 Warhawk

Assigned to Elmendorf Field, Alaska Territory, TDY to Fort Glenn AAB beginning 6 June-19 September 1942

344th Fighter Squadron, P-40 Warhawk

Assigned to Fort Glenn AAB, 8 March-23 May 1943

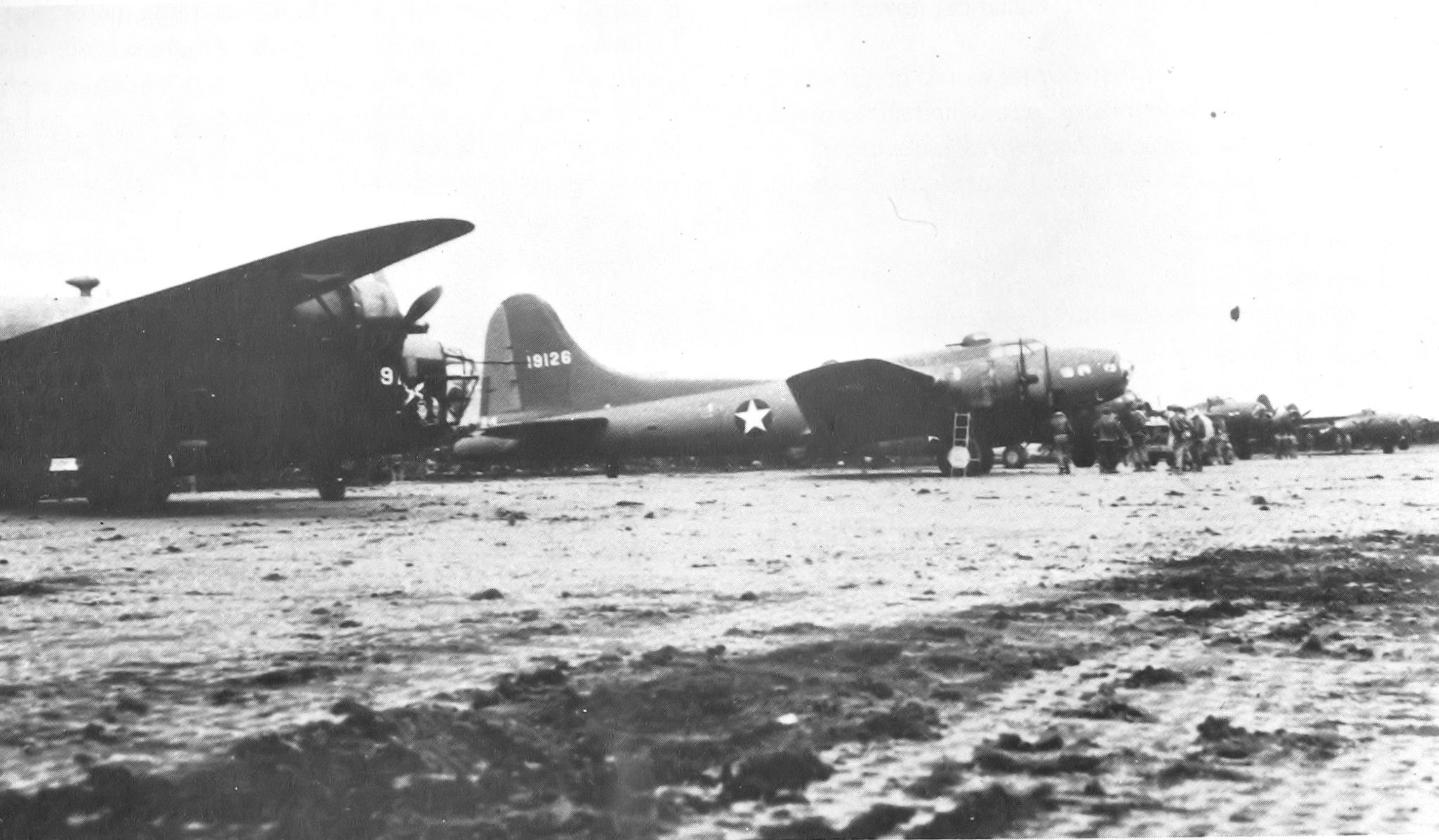
36th Bombardment Squadron LB-30 Liberator and a Boeing B-17E Fortress (41-9126) at Fort Glenn AAB, June 1942

By the close of 1942, Fort Glenn AAB had 10,579 personnel assigned, but its role as an advanced air base had been supplanted by new air bases on Adak and Amchitka Islands in early 1943 farther to the west. By the end of the year, the base had become a backwater; its mission to provide housing and rations for transient personnel and the servicing of transient aircraft.

=== Closure ===
After the war ended, Fort Glenn remained open as a refueling stop for transient aircraft in the Aleutians along with Military Air Transport Service flights using the Great Circle Route from Japan to the United States. The main runway, however, was extended to 8,300-foot (2,500 m) to accommodate large, long range aircraft. By 1946, the base maintained only a skeleton staff due to the rapid demobilization of the Air Force.

The last Air Force personnel were withdrawn by 30 September 1947, and the base was put on inactive status and was effectively abandoned. It was decommissioned in 1950 and the site was excessed between 1952-55 to the Bureau of Land Management. It was later transferred to numerous owners (Native corporations and the State of Alaska). Today hundreds of buildings, runways, and World War II artillery emplacements remain in various states of deterioration."

In 1987, the site was added to the National Register of Historic Places as Cape Field at Fort Glenn. The remains of the base are "the most comprehensive and intact World War II base in the Aleutian Islands" It is located on Umnak Island in the Aleutian Islands.

Today, Fort Glenn AAF is a virtual ghost town except for a family of cattle ranchers who have renovated several World War II buildings and who call the base home. The expanse and undisturbed quality of the resource make Fort Glenn AAF an outstanding conceptual model for landscape preservation. In 1991, National Park Service historians visited the site to review the World War II-related construction, infrastructure, landscape, and objects.

It was determined that any environmental cleanup should be designed to remove loose cables, transformers, hazardous material, toxic waste, and ordnance. Nontoxic World War II-related objects such as empty barrels could be left in place; full barrels would be, of course, another issue. All other buildings, structures, and infrastructure—no matter how "unsightly"—would be left intact and preserved: in this case preservation can simply mean avoidance and the acceptance that the buildings and structures have a definite place within the landscape.

On Saturday July 12, 2008, nearby Mount Okmok, erupted, sending ash 50,000 feet in the air and forcing the evacuation of the residents of the ranch. The eruption obliterated all remains of the South Pacifier Emergency landing strip, although some evidence of remains still are visible in aerial imagery.

== See also ==
- Alaska World War II Army Airfields
- List of National Historic Landmarks in Alaska
- National Register of Historic Places listings in Aleutians West Census Area, Alaska
