= Alaska Airlines Flight 779 =

1961 aviation accident

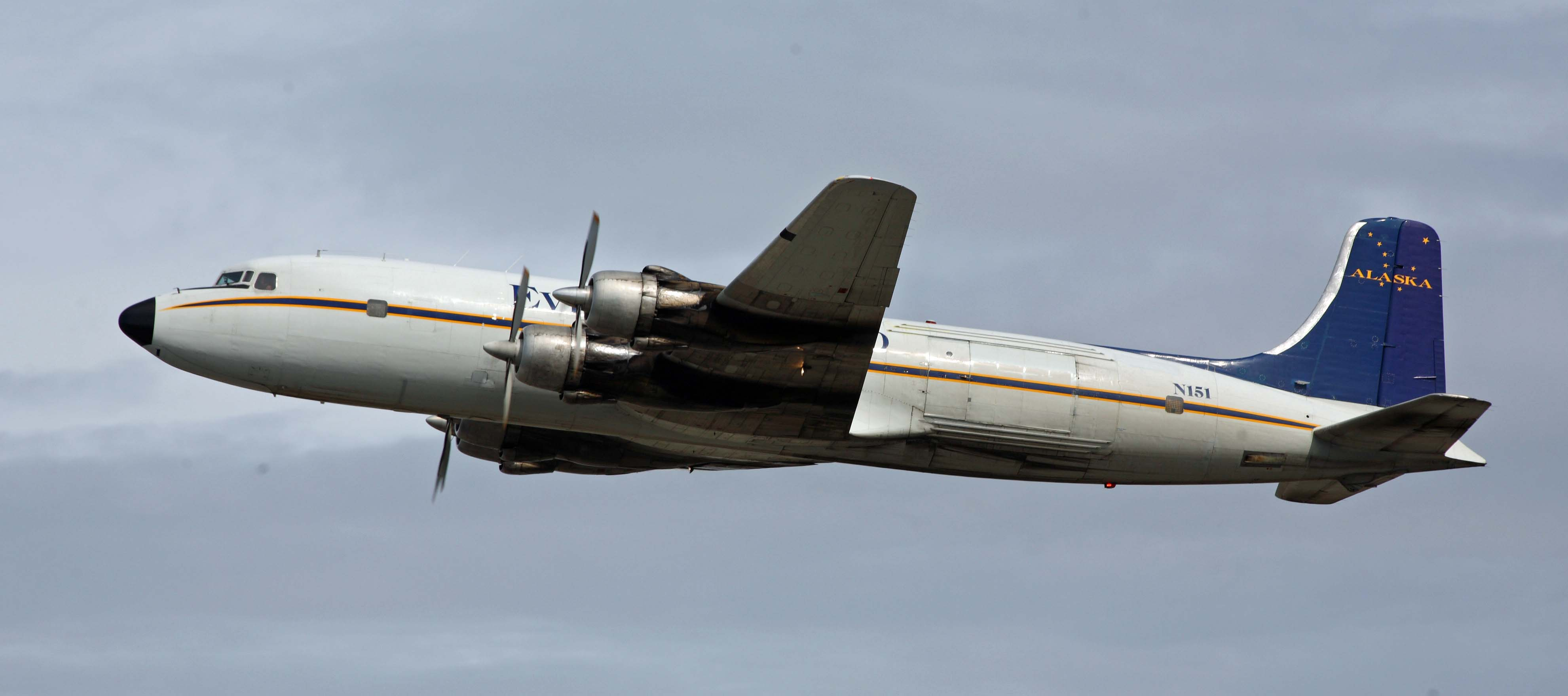
- A Douglas DC-6, the aircraft type involved in the accident

Accident
- Date: July 21, 1961
- Summary: Controlled flight into terrain short of runway
- Site: Shemya Air Force Base, Shemya, Aleutian Islands, Alaska, United States

Aircraft
- Aircraft type: Douglas DC-6A
- Operator: Alaska Airlines
- Registration: N6118C
- Flight origin: Paine Field, Everett, Washington
- 1st stopover: Travis Air Force Base
- 2nd stopover: Anchorage International Airport
- Last stopover: Shemya Air Force Base
- Destination: Tachikawa Airfield
- Occupants: 6
- Passengers: 0
- Crew: 6
- Fatalities: 6
- Survivors: 0

Alaska Airlines Flight 779 was a contract cargo flight operated on July 21, 1961 by an Alaska Airlines Douglas DC-6A that crashed short of the runway at Shemya Air Force Base with the loss of all six crew members on board.

The investigating board determined that the probable cause of the accident was a lack of approach and runway lighting and improper guidance by the air traffic controller.

== Accident ==
The DC-6A was chartered by the Military Air Transport Service to carry cargo from Travis Air Force Base to Tachikawa, Japan with refueling stopovers in Anchorage and Shemya. On July 20, the flight departed Everett without cargo en route to Travis Air Force Base. Upon arrival in Travis military personnel loaded 25,999 pounds (11,793 kg) of cargo onto the aircraft under the supervision of the flight engineer. The flight then departed Travis en route to Alaska, for the purpose of refueling and picking up the navigator from Anchorage. It took 8 hours and 59 minutes for the flight to arrive at Anchorage from Travis. The aircraft was at Anchorage Airport for an hour and 8 minutes. The time from takeoff in Anchorage to the crash was 6 hours and 30 minutes. In Anchorage, the crew was given weather information for the route to Shemya but were not notified of the approach and field lighting deficiencies.

Flight 779 took off from Anchorage at 19:40 en route to Shemya on an instrument flight plan. At 00:45 the flight radioed Shemya air traffic control; reporting their position as 55° 46' North and 179° 08' East at an altitude of 10,000 feet. The flight was 100 miles from Shemya 43 minutes later. At 01:45 the flight made radar contact with the airport, at an altitude of 5,500 feet and 18 miles north-northeast of the destination. The air traffic controller reported that the flight entered the glidepath and stayed on the correct approach for runway 10, but two miles from touchdown the flight was 10–15 feet below the ideal glidepath, so he instructed the crew to ""ease the aircraft up"; but the crew failed to correct the position. One mile from touchdown the aircraft was 30–40 feet below the glidepath, to which the controller again instructed the flight crew to "bring the aircraft up." Despite the warnings the flight still maintained the current path with no corrections to the altitude. The flight was still above the minimum safe altitude, and when the flight began to descend rapidly the controller assumed that the pilots switched to a visual approach. At 02:11 Alaska time the flight crashed 200 feet short of the runway in Shemya, killing all six crew members on board.

Wind at speeds of 20 knots were present at an altitude of approximately 500 feet. At 02:12, when the observer of the U. S. Weather Bureau was notified, the weather conditions as follows were recorded:

Indefinite 200-foot variable ceiling; visibility 3/4 mile variable, fog; temperature 45°; dewpoint 45°, wind south-southeast 8 knots; altimeter setting 29.84; ceiling 100 feet variable to 300 feet, visibility 1/2 mile variable to one mile.

== Aircraft ==
The aircraft involved was a Douglas DC-6A equipped with four Pratt & Whitney R2800 CB17 engines with registration number N6118C. It was manufactured in a cargo configuration for Alaska Airlines on 20 October 1957 with serial number 45243. At the time of the accident, it had accumulated 10,600 air frame hours and had undergone a major inspection 146 hours prior to the accident.

== Investigation ==
The investigation revealed that the aircraft was in full working order when it crashed, in line with federal regulations and company procedures. All four engines were running when it crashed. Fuel management logs and main tank gauges showed that there was adequate supply of fuel to the engines prior to the crash. Control surfaces and aircraft structures were shown to be functional prior to the crash with no evidence of mechanical malfunction.

== Causes ==
The investigation revealed that the approach lights for the runway were not lit on the night of the crash. The pilot could not have known that only one strobe light was lit because the air traffic controller failed to adequately inform of the status of the runway lights. The landing would be illegal under current FAA regulations, but was not at the time.
