= 77th Weapons Squadron =

United States Air Force unit

77th Bombardment Squadron
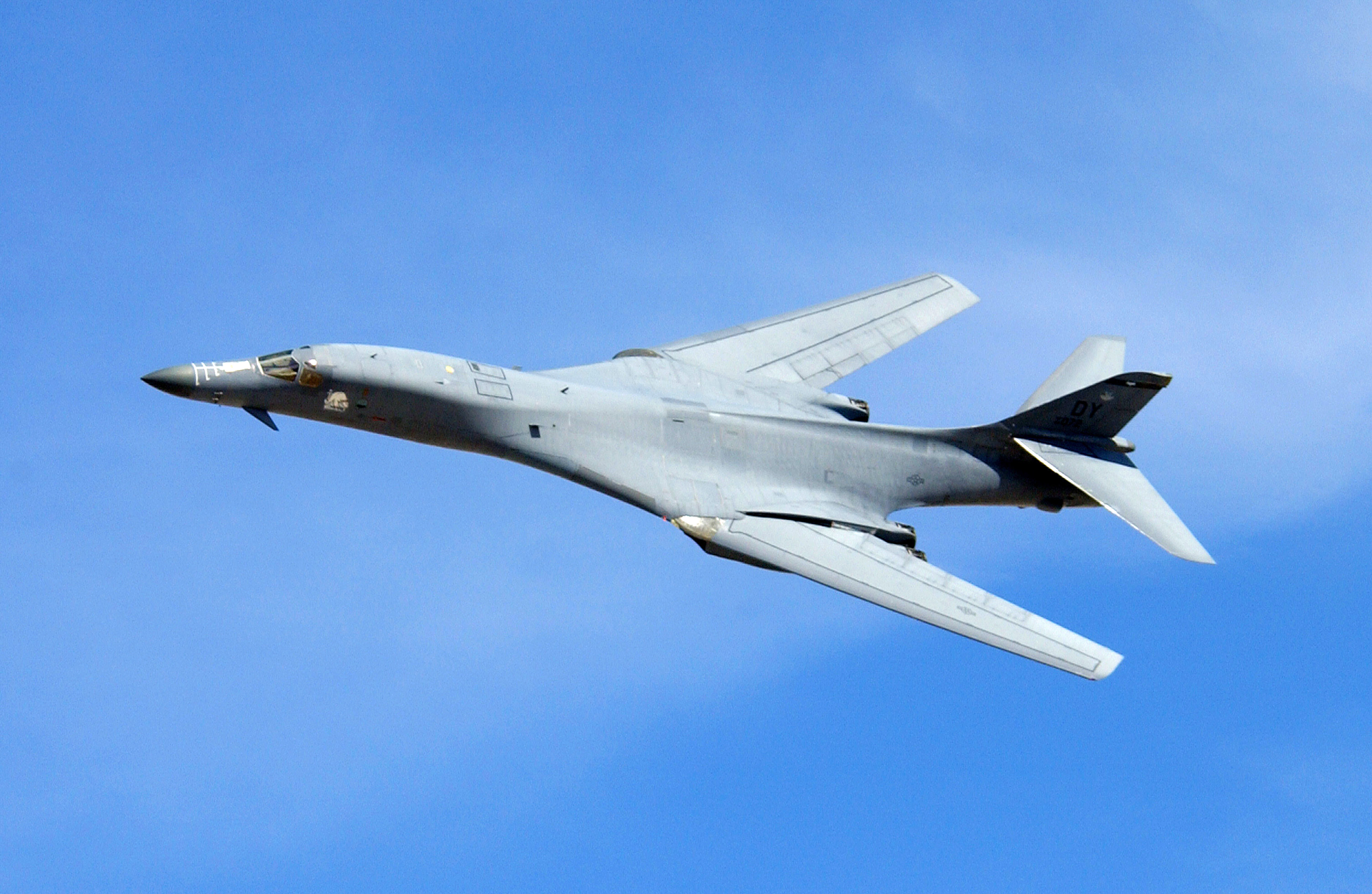
- B-1B Lancer from Dyess AFB, Texas performing a fly-by during a firepower demonstration
- Active: 1941–1945; 1946–1995; 1997–2002; 2003–present
- Country: United States
- Branch: United States Air Force
- Type: Squadron
- Role: Advanced B-1 Lancer Training
- Part of: Air Combat Command
- Garrison/HQ: Dyess Air Force Base, Texas
- Engagements: World War II: Aleutian Campaign; Air Offensive Asia-Pacific Theater, Air Offensive Japan

- Decorations: Distinguished Unit Citation Air Force Outstanding Unit Award with Combat "V" Device Air Force Outstanding Unit Award (12x) Republic of Vietnam Gallantry Cross with Palm

Insignia
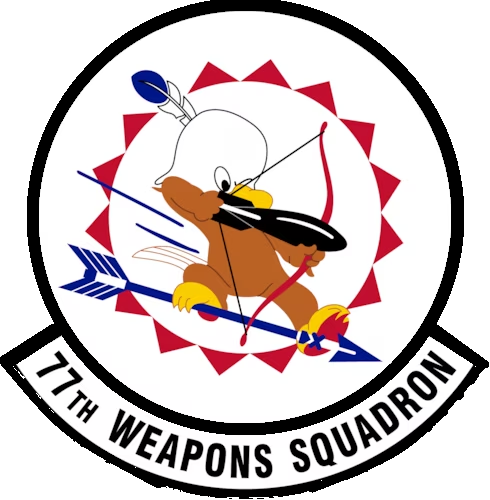
- 77th Weapons Squadron emblem (Note: Changed 27 March 2023.)

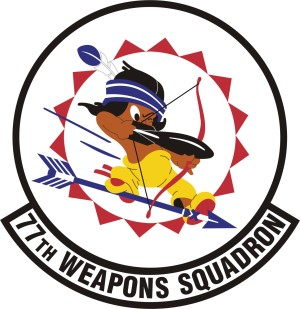
- 77th Weapons Squadron emblem (Note: Approved 17 May 1997. This emblem is based on the unofficial emblem designed for the squadron c. December 1941 by the Disney Studios. Although the emblem is partly imaged on this most recently archived page showing the emblem, the link to the full emblem is broken. The image is available on the version of the page archived on 24 November 2016 at .)

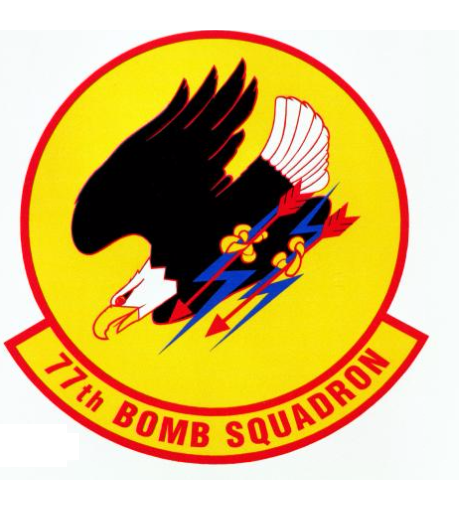
- 77th Bomb Squadron emblem

The 77th Weapons Squadron is a United States Air Force unit assigned to the USAF Weapons School, stationed at Dyess Air Force Base, Texas. The 77th is a geographically separated unit of the 57th Wing, stationed at Nellis Air Force Base, Nevada. The mission of the squadron is to provide B-1 Lancer instructional flying and weapons training at Dyess Air Force Base, TX and Ellsworth Air Force Base, South Dakota.

The unit activated on 15 January 1941 at Fort Douglas, Utah. After combat operations in the Pacific theater during World War II, the 77th contributed to America's nuclear deterrent during the Cold War, as well as the Air Force's B-52 force during the Vietnam War.

== History ==
=== World War II ===
The squadron was activated in January 1941 as a Northwest Air District medium bomber squadron, equipped with a mixture of Douglas B-18 Bolos, Stearman PT-17 Kaydet trainers and early model Martin B-26 Marauders. Upon completion of training, it was assigned to the new Elmendorf Field, near Anchorage, Alaska, becoming one of the first United States Army Air Corps units assigned to Alaska. After the Japanese attack on Pearl Harbor, the squadron flew antisubmarine patrols over the Gulf of Alaska.

When the Japanese invaded the Aleutian Islands in June 1942, the squadron was reassigned to Fort Glenn Army Airfield on Adak Island and began combat missions over the captured islands of Kiska and Attu. The squadron flew combat missions with Martin B-26 Marauders and later North American B-25 Mitchell medium bombers during the Aleutian Campaign. They remained in Alaska until World War II ended in 1945, after which squadron personnel were demobilized. While inactivate, the unit acted as a paper unit in early November 1945. Staff sergeant and later actor Charlton Heston served as a radio operator and gunner aboard a B-25 Mitchell of the 77th from 1944-45.

=== Cold War ===
The 77th was reactivated as a Strategic Air Command Boeing B-29 Superfortress squadron in 1946, based in the Midwest for training before being moved to Alaska in late 1946. The mission changed from strategic bombardment training to strategic reconnaissance and mapping, involving long range reconnaissance missions above the Bering Strait, North Pacific coast and the Arctic Ocean coastline of the Soviet Union. The squadron performed charting and other mapping missions, likely including ferret and ELINT missions.

The squadron returned to the Continental United States in 1947, being equipped with Convair B-36 Peacemaker strategic bombers, both in the bomber and strategic reconnaissance versions. It undertook strategic bombardment training missions on a global scale, including strategic reconnaissance missions with the RB-36s until the phaseout of the B-36 from the Strategic Air Command in 1957.

The 77th was re-equipped with Boeing B-52D Stratofortresses and stood nuclear alert and conducted global strategic bombardment training missions until 1966, when it began rotational deployments to Andersen Air Force Base, Guam, flying conventional strategic bombardment Operation Arc Light missions over Indochina (1966–1970). Converting to B-52G in 1971, the squadron returned to nuclear alert status, upgrading to B-52H in 1977. In 1985, it received the first production Rockwell B-1B Lancers and maintained nuclear alert until the end of the Cold War in 1991. Strategic bombardment training continued until 1997, when the squadron was inactivated as part of the draw down of the USAF.

=== Modern era ===
The organization was established as the USAF Weapons School B-1 Division on 28 August 1992 at Nellis Air Force Base, Nevada. It was redesignated 77th Weapons Squadron in 2003. It provides training to B-1 aircrews at Dyess Air Force Base in Texas.

== Lineage ==
- Constituted as the 77th Bombardment Squadron (Medium) on 20 November 1940
- Activated on 15 January 1941
- Redesignated 77th Bombardment Squadron, Medium on 9 October 1944
- Inactivated on 5 November 1945
- Redesignated 77th Bombardment Squadron, Very Heavy on 15 July 1946
- Activated on 4 August 1946
- Redesignated 77th Bombardment Squadron, Medium on 28 May 1948
- Redesignated 77th Bombardment Squadron, Heavy on 16 May 1949
- Redesignated 77th Strategic Reconnaissance Squadron, Photographic on 1 April 1950
- Redesignated 77th Strategic Reconnaissance Squadron, Heavy on 16 July 1950
- Redesignated 77th Bombardment Squadron, Heavy on 1 October 1955
- Redesignated 77th Bomb Squadron on 1 September 1991
- Inactivated on 31 March 1995
- Activated on 1 April 1997
- Inactivated on 19 September 2002
- Redesignated 77 Weapons Squadron on 24 January 2003
- Activated on 3 February 2003

=== Assignments ===
- 42d Bombardment Group, 15 January 1941
- 28th Composite Group (later 28 Bombardment Group), 2 January 1942
- Eleventh Air Force, 20 October – 5 November 1945
- 28 Bombardment Group (later 28 Strategic Reconnaissance Group), 4 August 1946 (attached to 28th Strategic Reconnaissance Wing after 10 February 1951)
- 28th Strategic Reconnaissance Wing (later 28 Bombardment Wing), 16 June 1952
- 28th Operations Group, 1 September 1991 – 31 March 1995
- 28th Operations Group, 1 April 1997 – 19 September 2002
- USAF Weapons School, 3 February 2003 – present

=== Stations ===
- Salt Lake City Army Air Base, Utah, 15 January 1941
- Gowen Field, Idaho, 4 June – 14 December 1941
- Elmendorf Field, Alaska, 29 December 1941 (air echelon operated from Fort Glenn Army Air Field, Alaska beginning 30 May 1942
- Adak Army Air Field, Alaska Territory, 3 October 1942 (air echelon operated from Adak Army Air Field, Alaska, beginning 12 December 1942 and from Amchitka Army Air Field, Alaska, beginning 9 March 1943)

Air echelon operated from Attu Airfield, Alaska, beginning 10 July 1943

- Amchitka Army Air Field, Alaska, 11 September 1943
- Attu Airfield, Alaska, 11 February 1944 – 19 October 1945
- Fort Lawton, Washington, 29 October-5 November 1945
- Grand Island Army Air Field, Nebraska, 4 August-6 October 1946
- Elmendorf Field, Alaska, 20 October 1946 – 24 April 1947
- Rapid City Army Air Field (later Rapid City Air Force Base; Ellsworth Air Force Base), South Dakota, 17 April 1947 (air echelon), 3 May 1947 (ground echelon) – 31 March 1995
- Ellsworth Air Force Base, South Dakota, 1 April 1997 – 19 September 2002
- Dyess Air Force Base, Texas, 3 February 2003 – present

=== Aircraft ===
- Douglas B-18 Bolo, 1941, 1942–1943
- Stearman PT-17 Kaydet, 1941
- Martin B-26 Marauder, 1941–1943
- North American B-25 Mitchell, 1942–1945
- Boeing B-29 Superfortress, 1946–1950
- Boeing RB-29 Superfortress, 1946–1950
- Convair B-36 Peacemaker, 1949–1950; 1950–1957
- Convair RB-36 Peacemaker, 1949–1950; 1950–1957
- Boeing B-52 Stratofortress
- B-52D Stratofortress, 1957–1971
- B-52G Stratofortress, 1971–1977
- B-52H Stratofortress, 1977–1985
- Rockwell B-1B Lancer, 1985–1995, 1997–2002, 2003 – present

== See also ==
- List of B-52 Units of the United States Air Force
