= Casco Cove Coast Guard Station =

Casco Cove Coast Guard Station LORAN Station Attu
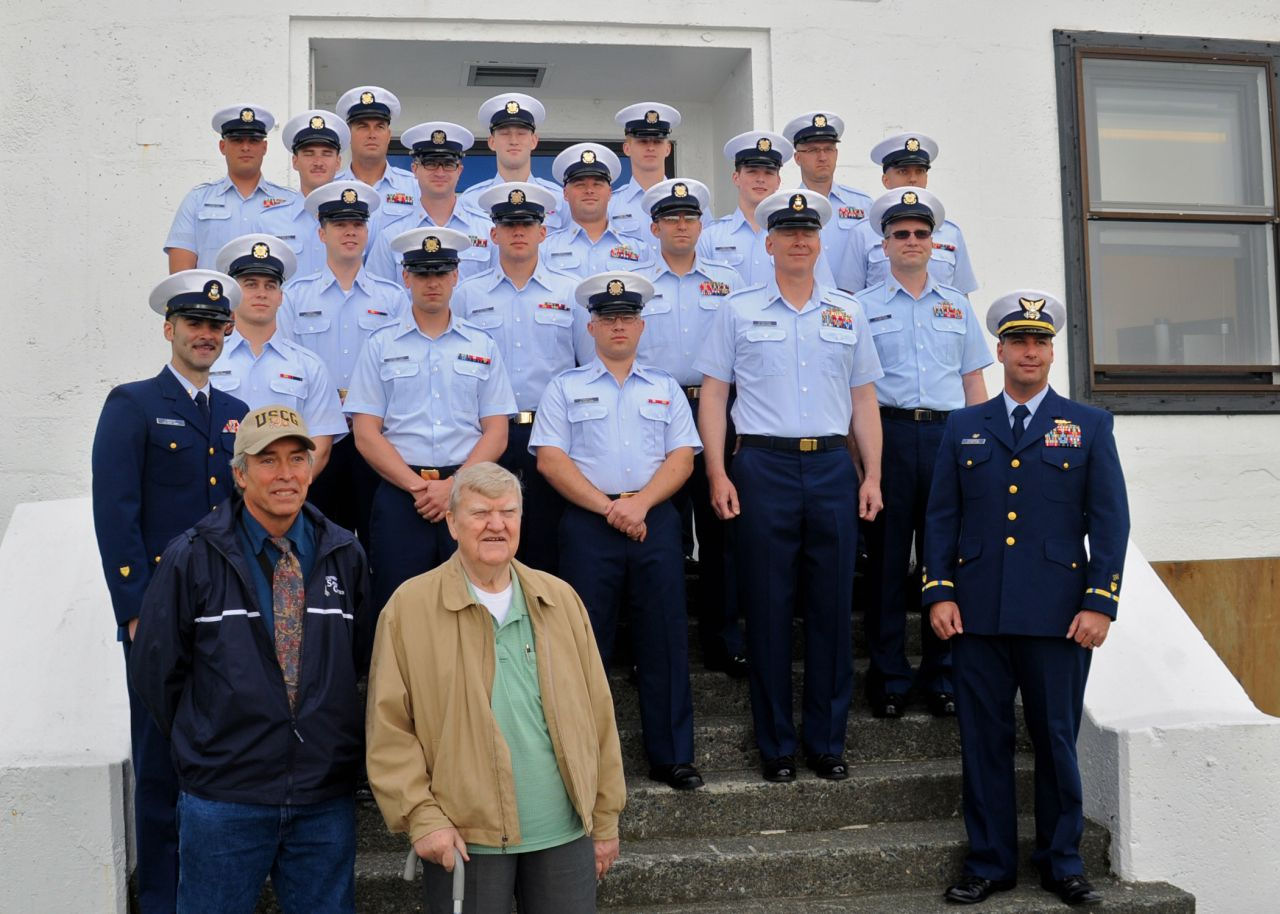
- Closure of LORAN Station Attu, August 2010
- IATA: ATU; ICAO: PAAT; FAA LID: ATU

Summary
- Airport type: Private use
- Owner: U.S. Coast Guard 17th Dist.
- Location: Attu Island, Alaska
- Elevation AMSL: 88 ft (27 m)
- Coordinates: 52°49′57″N 173°10′32″E

Map
- Location of airport in Alaska

Runways
Direction	Length		Surface
Direction	ft	m	Surface
2/20	5,998	1,828	Asphalt
- Source: Federal Aviation Administration

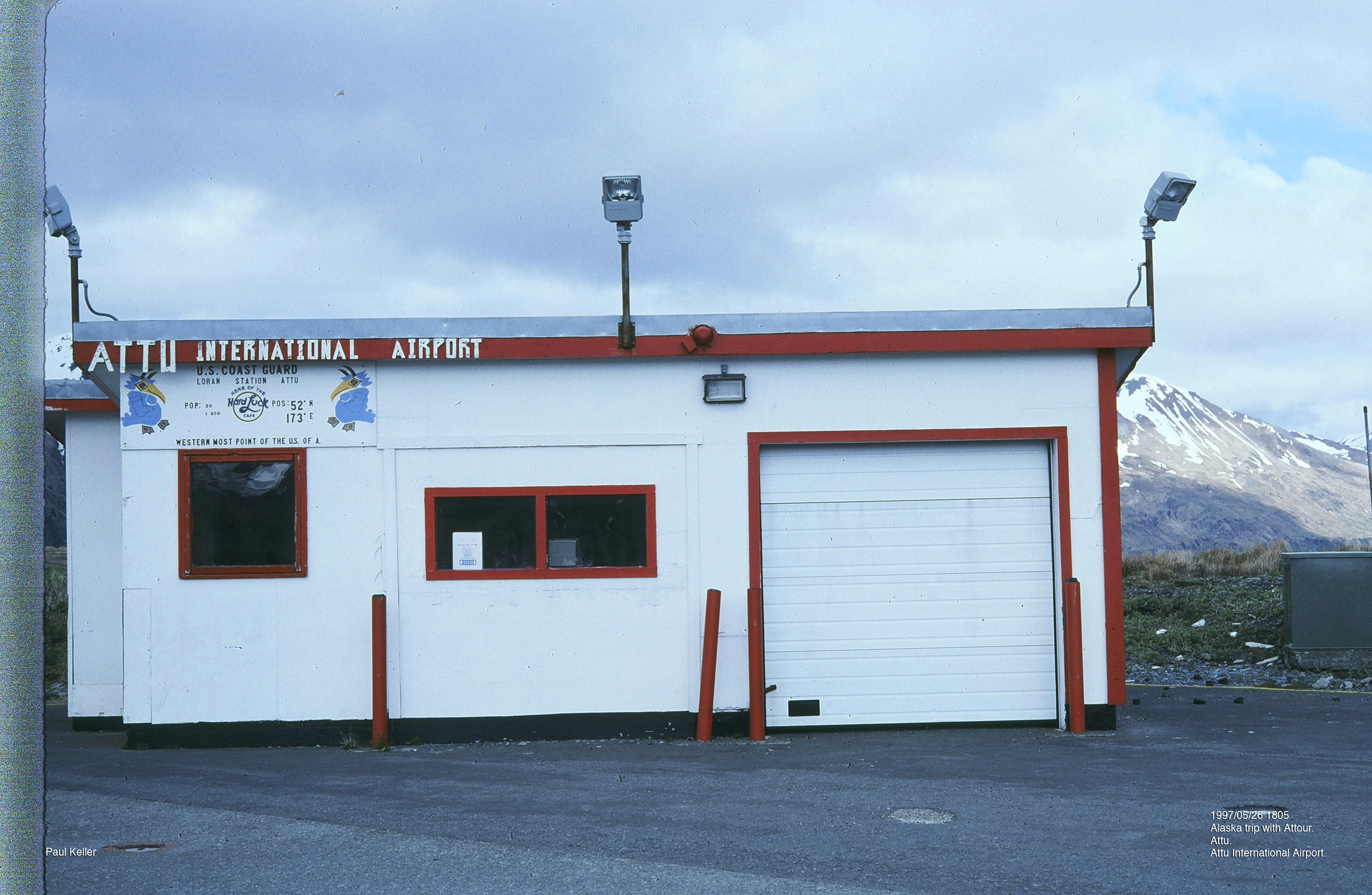
Attu Airport terminal

Casco Cove Coast Guard Station (IATA: ATU, ICAO: PAAT, FAA LID: ATU) was a military facility and private use airfield on Attu Island, one of the Aleutian Islands in the U.S. state of Alaska. Owned by the United States Coast Guard, Casco Cove CGS is located 1,481 miles (2,383 km) west of Anchorage, Alaska. Also known as LORAN Station Attu, the facility was closed on August 27, 2010, but the airfield remains available for emergency use.

== History ==
Established as Naval Air Facility Attu on June 7, 1943, just seven days after Attu Island was declared secured. The base was built by Seabees of the Naval Construction Battalion 4.

== Overview ==
The Casco Cove Airport was a LORAN navigation station operated by the United States Coast Guard. The USCG personnel lived in a group quarters facility. There were no families stationed at Attu. All services needed for staff in this facility were available. Electricity was provided by USCG Generator. Auxiliary health care was provided by USCG emergency medical staff.

Casco Cove is one of the most isolated and remote airports in the United States. Flying into and taking off from the airport was hazardous, as the weather is characterized by persistently overcast skies, high winds, and frequent cyclonic storms. Winter squalls produce wind gusts in excess of 100 knots (115 mph). During the summer, extensive fog forms over the Bering Sea and North Pacific.

The island is protected as part of the National Parks Trust territory and few people visit the island or area, as it is restricted. Gun emplacements for over twenty guns are still present around the airfield.

== Facilities ==
Casco Cove CGS resides at elevation of 88 feet (27 m) above mean sea level. It has one runway designated 2/20 with an asphalt surface measuring 5,998 by 150 feet (1,828 x 46 m).

== Incidents ==
- 1 January 1945, 2nd Lt. Robert L. Nesmith flying from Alexai Point, crashed his Lockheed P-38G-10-LO Lightning in Temnac Valley, just west of Attu Station, while on a low-level training mission over Attu. This aircraft was recovered in 1999 and is now static-restored and on display at Elmendorf AFB.
- 30 July 1982, a US Coast Guard HC-130 transport crashed just south of the station, killing 2 of the 11 onboard. The crew were trying to navigate visually to the airfield in low clouds, and mistook Murder Point for Alexai Point, crashing on Weston Mountain at 52°47.554′N 173°7.956′E. Debris can still be seen on satellite imagery.

== See also ==
- Attu Station, Alaska
- Alaska World War II Army Airfields
- List of airports in Alaska
