= 515th Regiment =

515th Regiment may refer to:

- 515th Coast Artillery, United States
- 515th Parachute Infantry Regiment, United States
- 515th Regiment (United States)
- 515th (Suffolk) Coast Regiment, Royal Artillery
- 515th (Isle of Man) Light Anti-Aircraft Regiment, Royal Artillery

== See also ==
- 515th (disambiguation)
