= 407th Air Expeditionary Group =

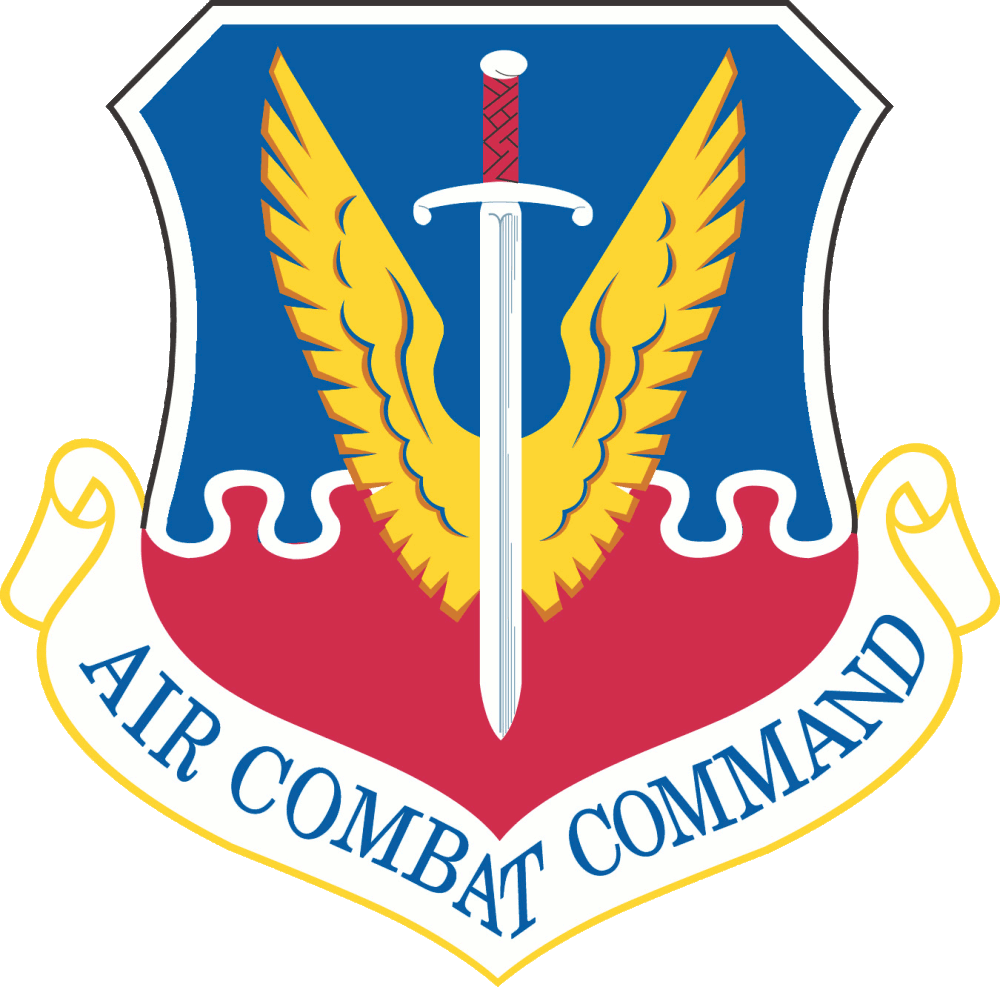
407th Air Expeditionary Group

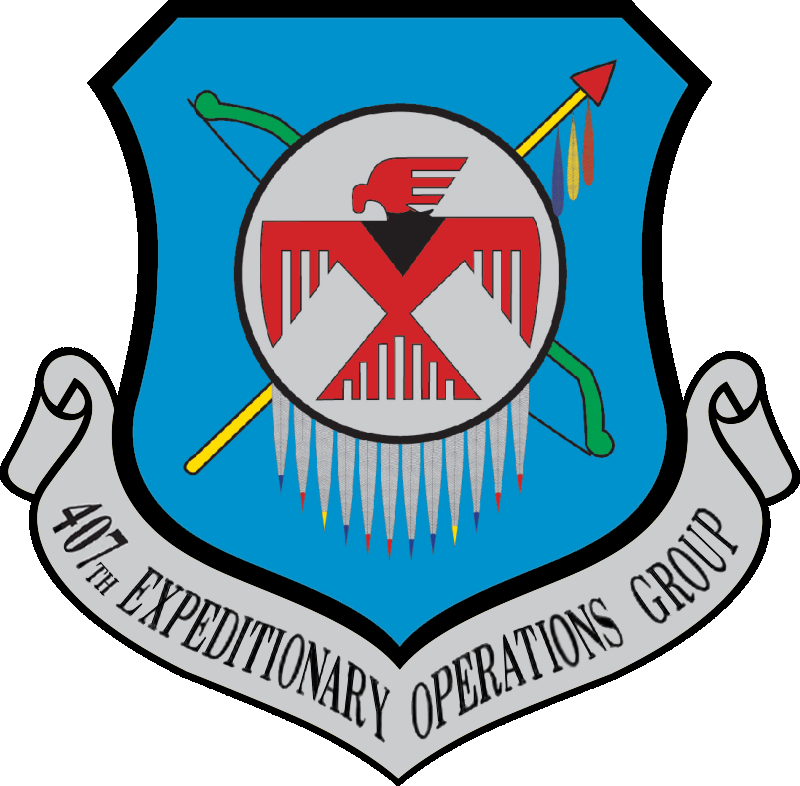
- 407th Air Expeditionary Group emblem
- Active: 1943–1944; 1953–1957; 2003–2011; 2016–2022
- Country: United States
- Branch: United States Air Force
- Type: Air Expeditionary Group
- Part of: Air Combat Command

Commanders
- Notable commanders: Carroll W. McColpin

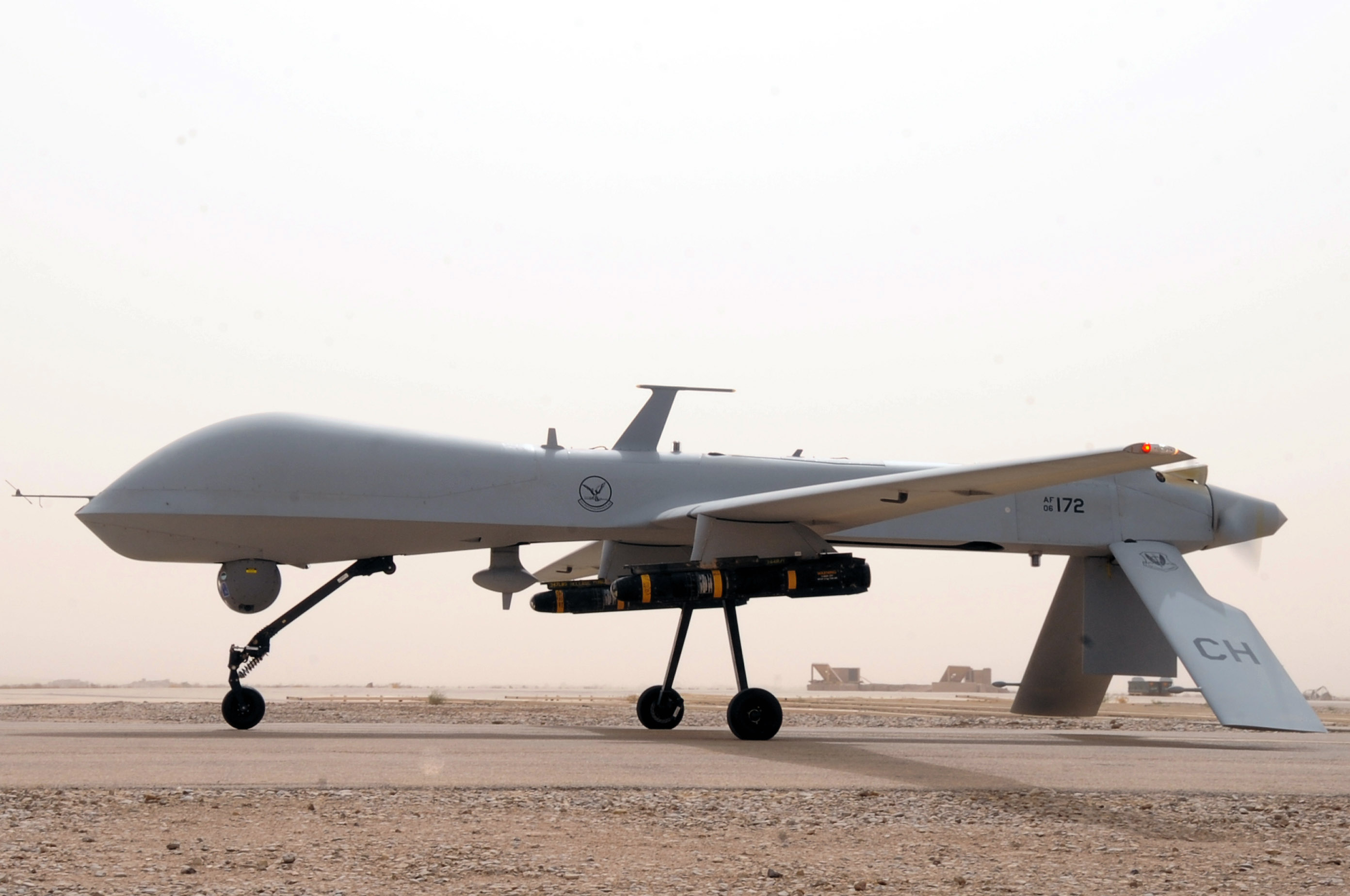
General Atomics RQ-1Q Predator 06-172 (361st ERS) deployed from Creech AFB, Nevada at Ali Base, Iraq.

The 407th Air Expeditionary Group is a provisional United States Air Force unit assigned to Air Combat Command to activate or inactivate as needed. It was stationed at Ali Air Base, Iraq, until the closure of the base on 16 December 2011. It was activated as part of the 332d Air Expeditionary Wing due to Military intervention against ISIL at Ali Al Salem Air Base, Kuwait, and Ahmad al-Jaber Air Base, Kuwait. In 2023 Jane's Defence Weekly confirmed that the group had been inactivated.

The 407th provided air operations support for coalition air dominance, battlespace control, and security to advance the stabilization of southern Iraq. It provides coalition tactical airlift support with aerial port operations. It was the first Air Force unit to stand up combat operations within Iraq during Operation Iraqi Freedom.

The group traces its history back to the World War II 407th Bombardment Group which was established 23 March 1943, at Drew Field, Florida. The air echelon was attached to Eleventh Air Force in Amchitka, Alaska, from 19 July to 15 August 1943, where it performed combat operations against the Japanese in the Aleutian Islands.

== History ==
=== World War II ===
The 407th AEG traced its history back to the 407th Bombardment Group (Dive) which was established 23 March 1943, at Drew Field, Florida. Its subordinate squadrons at that time included the 632d, 633d, 634th and 635th Bombardment (Dive) Squadrons. The air echelon was attached to Eleventh Air Force in Amchitka, Alaska, from 19 July to 15 August 1943, where it performed combat operations against the Japanese in the Aleutian Islands.

The 407th was redesignated the 407th Fighter-Bomber Group on 15 August 1943. At that time, the 632d, 633d and 634th were redesignated the 515th, 516th and 517th Fighter-Bomber Squadrons, respectively, and the 635th was disbanded. In 1943, the 407th flew the Douglas A-24 Banshee dive bombers; North American A-36 Invader dive bombers, P-51D Mustangs, and the P-47 Thunderbolt from 1943 to 1944 as part of the Army Air Forces School of Applied Tactics. In October 1943 the group moved the Lakeland Army Air Field, Florida, and then to Galveston Army Air Field, Texas in November where it trained for combat, and functioned as a replacement unit until 1 April 1944, when it was disbanded.

=== Strategic Air Command ===
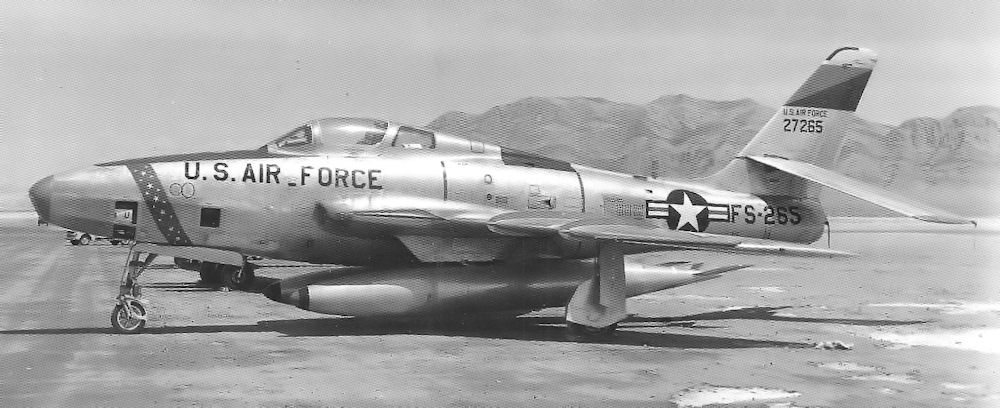
Republic RF-84K-20-RE Thunderflash 52-7265, 91st SRS, 1955

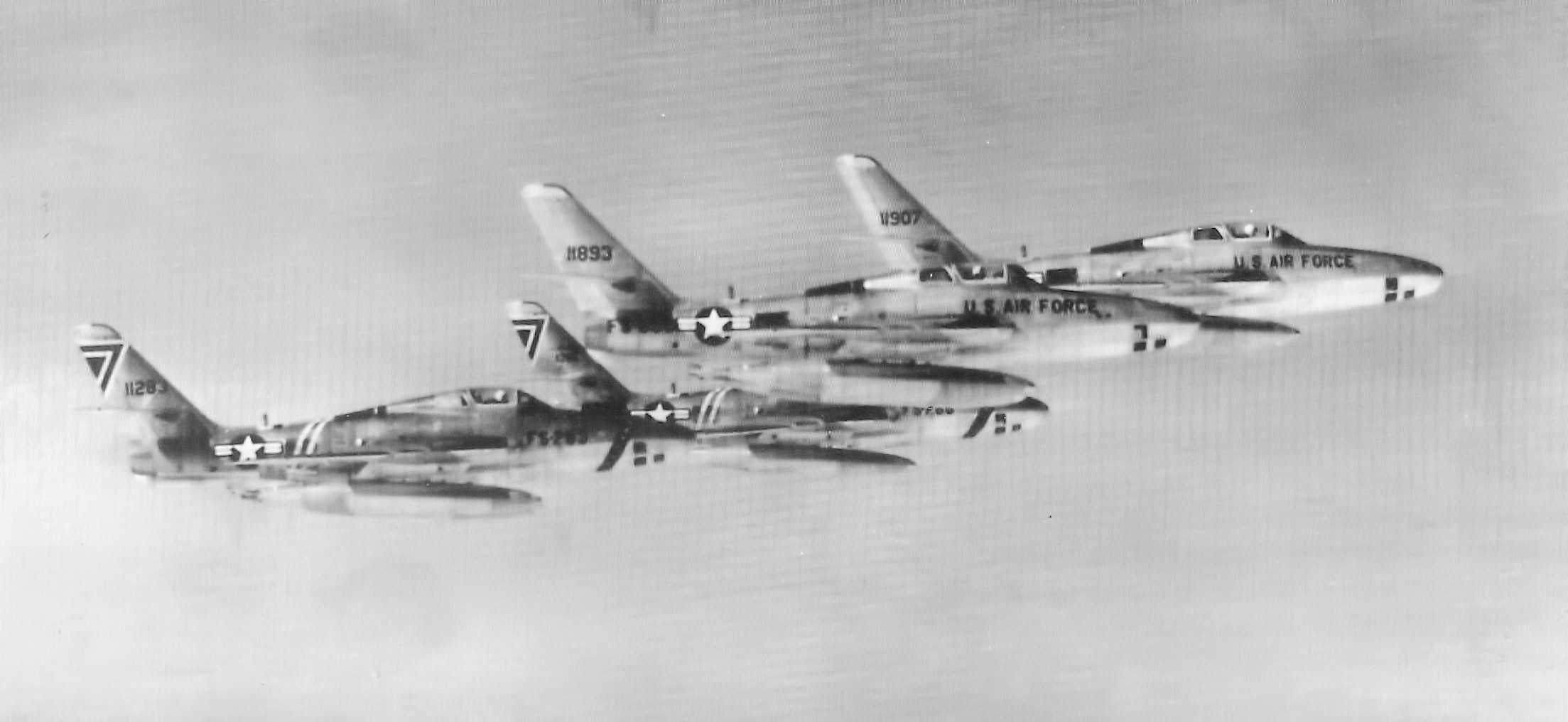
Flight of four 407th SFW RF-84F Thunderstreaks, Great Falls AFB, Montana, 1955

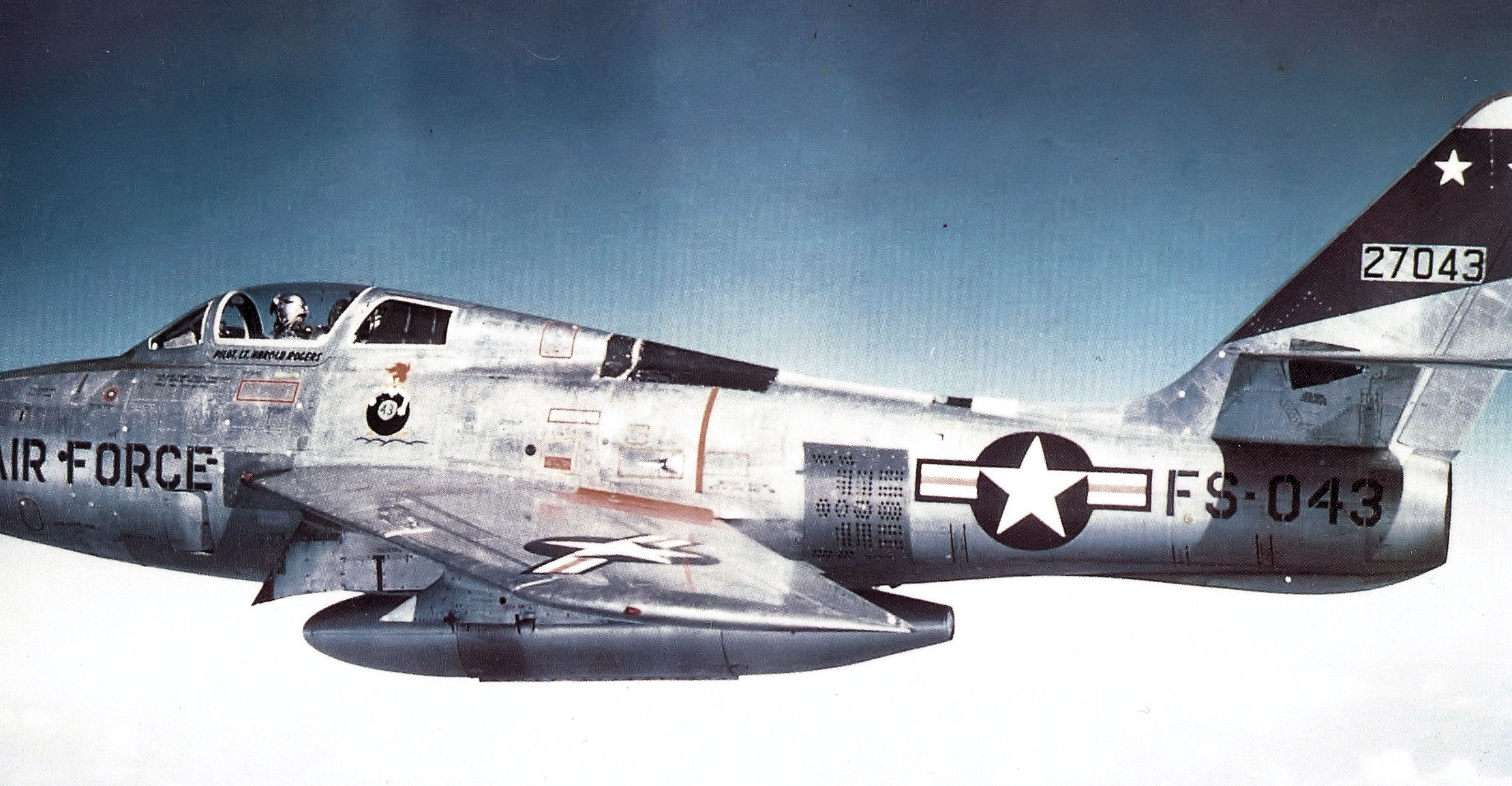
407th SFW F-84F Thunderstreak 52-7043, Great Falls AFB, Montana, 1955

The 407th was reactivated as the Strategic Air Command 407th Strategic Fighter Wing at Great Falls Air Force Base, Montana in 1953. While it was established on 23 March 1953 it was not activated until 18 December 1953. The wing was assigned to the Fifteenth Air Force and composed of the 407th Air Refueling Squadron with KB-29 Superfortress tankers and the 515th, 516th and 517th Strategic Fighter Squadrons, equipped with the Republic F-84G Thunderjet. Also assigned to the wing in "attached" status was the 91st Strategic Reconnaissance Squadron (20 December 1954 – 17 July 1955) with RF-84Ks. In 1955 KC-97s replaced the KB-29s.

Delays in delivery of the F-84Gs to the wing led to operational training not commencing until June 1954. Once operational, from August to November 1954, the 407th deployed to Misawa Air Base, Japan, where it provided air defense of northern Japan. In doing so, from 8 August to 10 November 1954 it was attached to the 39th Air Division (Defense). Returning to the United States, the wing sent its straight-winged F-84Gs to AMARC, and was re-equipped with newer and faster swept-wing F-84F Thunderstreaks. From Great Falls, the 407th provided long-range fighter escort and refueling for B-36 Peacemaker and B-50 Superfortress bombers.

The wing had a short life, as the strategic fighter doctrine was phased out of use beginning in 1956. The 407th SFW was inactivated on 1 July 1957.

=== Twenty-first century ===
The 407th was redesignated the 407th Air Expeditionary Group and later activated at Tallil Air Base (known as Ali Base), Iraq, on 14 April 2003 as a subordinate to the 332d Air Expeditionary Wing, which was stationed at Al Jaber Air Base, Kuwait.

Throughout the summer of 2003, the mission at Ali Base expanded. The flightline became home to A-10s, C-130s and Predators. The 332d AEW then transferred from Al Jaber AB, Kuwait, to Ali Base on 5 August 2003. During that period, the wing's A-10s destroyed more than 1,100 targets during major combat operations of Operation Iraqi Freedom. It was also here that U.S. Special Forces staged and planned the rescue of Army Private 1st Class Jessica Lynch, and where the private was flown out of Iraq.

In addition to its operational commitments, the 407th was the senior airfield authority at Ali Air Base, and was responsible for the defense, control, operations and maintenance of the airfield, land and facilities whose proximity affected airfield operations

Ali Air Base was fully vacated by all U.S. Forces on 16 December 2011, and the 407th was inactivated.

It was activated again in 2016, as part of the 332d Air Expeditionary Wing, as part of the Military intervention against ISIL stationed at Ali Al Salem Air Base, Kuwait, and Ahmad al-Jaber Air Base, Kuwait.

== Lineage ==
407th Fighter-Bomber Group

- Constituted as the 407th Bombardment Group (Dive) on 23 March 1943

Activated on 28 March 1943
Redesignated 407th Fighter-Bomber Group in August 1943
Disbanded on 1 April 1944

- Reconstituted and consolidated with the 407th Strategic Fighter Wing as the 407th Strategic Fighter Wing on 31 January 1984

407th Air Expeditionary Group

- Constituted as the 407th Strategic Fighter Wing on 25 March 1953

Activated on 18 December 1953
Inactivated on 1 July 1957

- Consolidated with the 407th Fighter-Bomber Group on 31 January 1984
- Converted to provisional status and redesignated 407th Air Expeditionary Group (Note: The emblem image indicates a unit name of 407th Expeditionary Operations Group.)

Activated on 17 April 2003
Inactivated on 16 December 2011
Activated during 2016

=== Assignments ===
- 22d Bombardment Training Wing, 28 March 1943
- III Fighter Command, 15 August 1943
- 72d Fighter Wing, 9 March 1943
- Second Air Force, 21 March – 1 April 1944
- Fifteenth Air Force, 18 December 1953 – 1 July 1957

Attached to the 39th Air Division (Defense), 8 August – 10 November 1954

- Allocated to Air Combat Command to activate or inactivate any time after 14 April 2003

Attached to United States Air Forces Central Command, 14 April 2003–present

Further attached to the 332d Air Expeditionary Wing, 14 April 2003 – 24 April 2010
Transferred under the 321st Air Expeditionary Advisory Wing, 24 April 2010 – 16 December 2011
Further attached to 332d Air Expeditionary Wing

=== Components ===
Operational units

- 91st Strategic Reconnaissance Squadron: Attached December 1954 – July 1955
- 361st Expeditionary Reconnaissance Squadron: Unnown
- 407th Air Refueling Squadron: 18 December 1953 – 1 July 1957
- 495th Bombardment Squadron: (Attached) 1944
- 632d Bombardment (later 515th Strategic Fighter) Squadron: 1943–1944; 18 December 1953 – 1 July 1957
- 633d Bombardment (later 516th Strategic Fighter) Squadron: 1943–1944; 18 December 1953 – 1 July 1957
- 634th Bombardment (later 517th Strategic Fighter) Squadron: 1943–1944; 18 December 1953 – 1 July 1957
- 635th Bombardment Squadron: 1 Mar-15 Aug 1943

Support units

- 407th Expeditionary Aircraft Maintenance Squadron: Unknown
- 407th Expeditionary Civil Engineer Squadron: Unknown
- 407th Expeditionary Communications Squadron: Unknown
- 407th Expeditionary Force Support Squadron: Unknown
- 407th Expeditionary Logistics Readiness Squadron: Unknown
- 407th Expeditionary Operations Support Squadron: Unknown
- 407th Expeditionary Security Forces Squadron: Unknown

=== Stations ===
- Drew Field, Florida, 28 March 1943

Operated from Amchitka Army Airfield, Alaska Territory, Jul–Aug 1943

- Lakeland Army Air Field, Florida, 2 October 1943
- Galveston Army Air Field, Texas, 9 Nov 1943 – 1 Apr 1944
- Great Falls Air Force Base, Montana, 18 December 1953 – 1 July 1957

Operated from Misawa Air Base, Japan, 8 August-10 November 1954

- Ali Air Base, Iraq, 14 April 2003 – 16 December 2011
- Ahmad al-Jaber Air Base, Kuwait, 2016 – January 2022

=== Aircraft ===
- A-24 Banshee, 1943
- A-36 Apache, 1943
- P-47 Thunderbolt, 1943–1944
- P-51 Mustang, 1943
- F-84 Thunderstreak, 1954–1957
- RF-84 Thunderflash, 1955
- KB-29 Superfortress, 1954–1957
- KC-97 Stratofreighter, 1957
- C-130H Hercules, 2004–2008
- RQ-1 Predator, 2003–2011
- MC-12W Liberty, 2009–2011
