= 515 (disambiguation) =

515 may refer to:

- The year 515.
- The year 515 BC.
- 515 (number), the natural number.
- 515 Athalia, a carbonaceous Themistian asteroid
- "5:15", a song by The Who.
- "5:15 (Bridgit Mendler song)", a song by American singer, Bridgit Mendler.
- "(515)", a song by American nu metal band Slipknot in the album Iowa.
- Area code 515, an area code serving part of the state of Iowa.
- Interstate 515, a spur of Interstate 15 serving the Las Vegas area.
- Fiat 515, a 1930s passenger car

== See also ==
- 515th (disambiguation)
