= 516th Strategic Fighter Squadron =

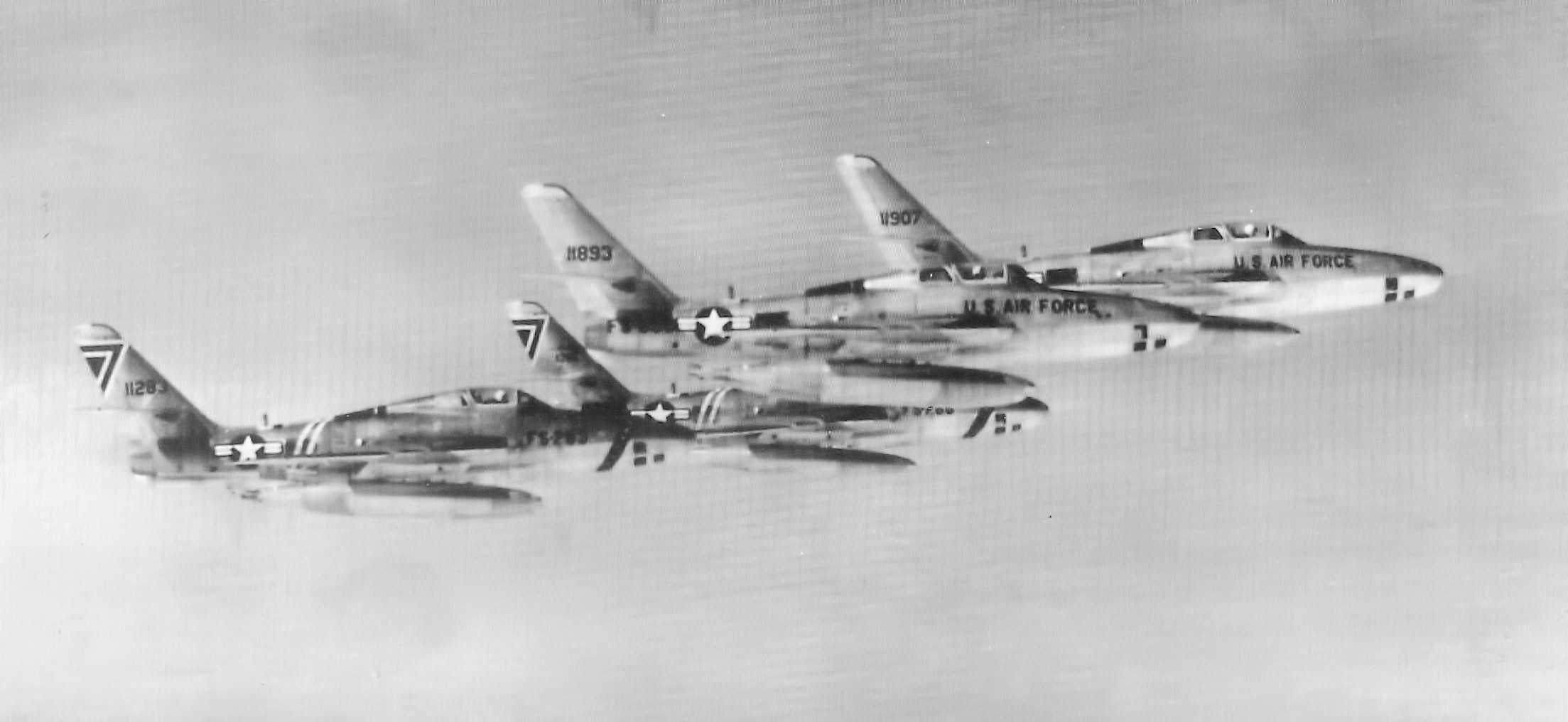
- 407th Wing RF-84F Thunderstreaks (Note: Visible is Republic RF-84F-15-RE Thunderflash, serial 51-11283 and Republic RF-84F-10-RE Thunderflashes, serials 51-1893 51-1907. Baugher, Joe (6 May 2023). "1951 USAF Serial Numbers". Joe Baugher.)
- Active: 1943–1944; 1953–1957
- Country: United States
- Branch: United States Air Force
- Role: Fighter
- Nickname: Blackfeet
- Motto: Four Winds
- Engagements: Aleutian Campaign

Insignia
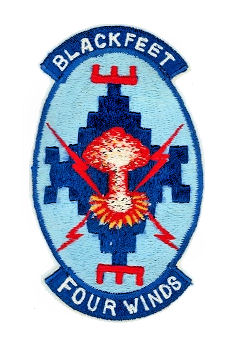
- Patch with 516th Strategic Fighter Squadron emblem (Note: Approved 18 October 1954. Description: Over a Blackfoot Indian symbol for the "Four Wingds" of blue and red, is a tylized atomic cloud, of red, yellow white, and light blue, between four lightning bolts in saltire, of the second [color mentioned].)

The 516th Strategic Fighter Squadron is an inactive United States Air Force unit. Its last assignment was with the 407th Strategic Fighter Wing at Great Falls Air Force Base, Montana, where it was inactivated on 1 July 1957.

The squadron was first activated in March 1943 as the 633d Bombardment Squadron and equipped with light ground attack aircraft. In July 1943, the air echelon of the squadron deployed to the Aleutian Islands to defend against the Japanese attacks there. It returned to the United States the following month and was redesignated the 516th Fighter-Bomber Squadron, while continuing to train for combat with the same mission. It became a Replacement Training Unit, but was disbanded in the spring of 1944 in a general reorganization of Army Air Forces training units.

The squadron was reactivated in 1953 as part of Strategic Air Command (SAC), flying escort fighters and a few air reconnaissance aircraft. In 1954, the squadron deployed to Japan and provided air defense for the northern part of the islands. It supported SAC bombardment operations until inactivating.

== History ==
=== World War II ===
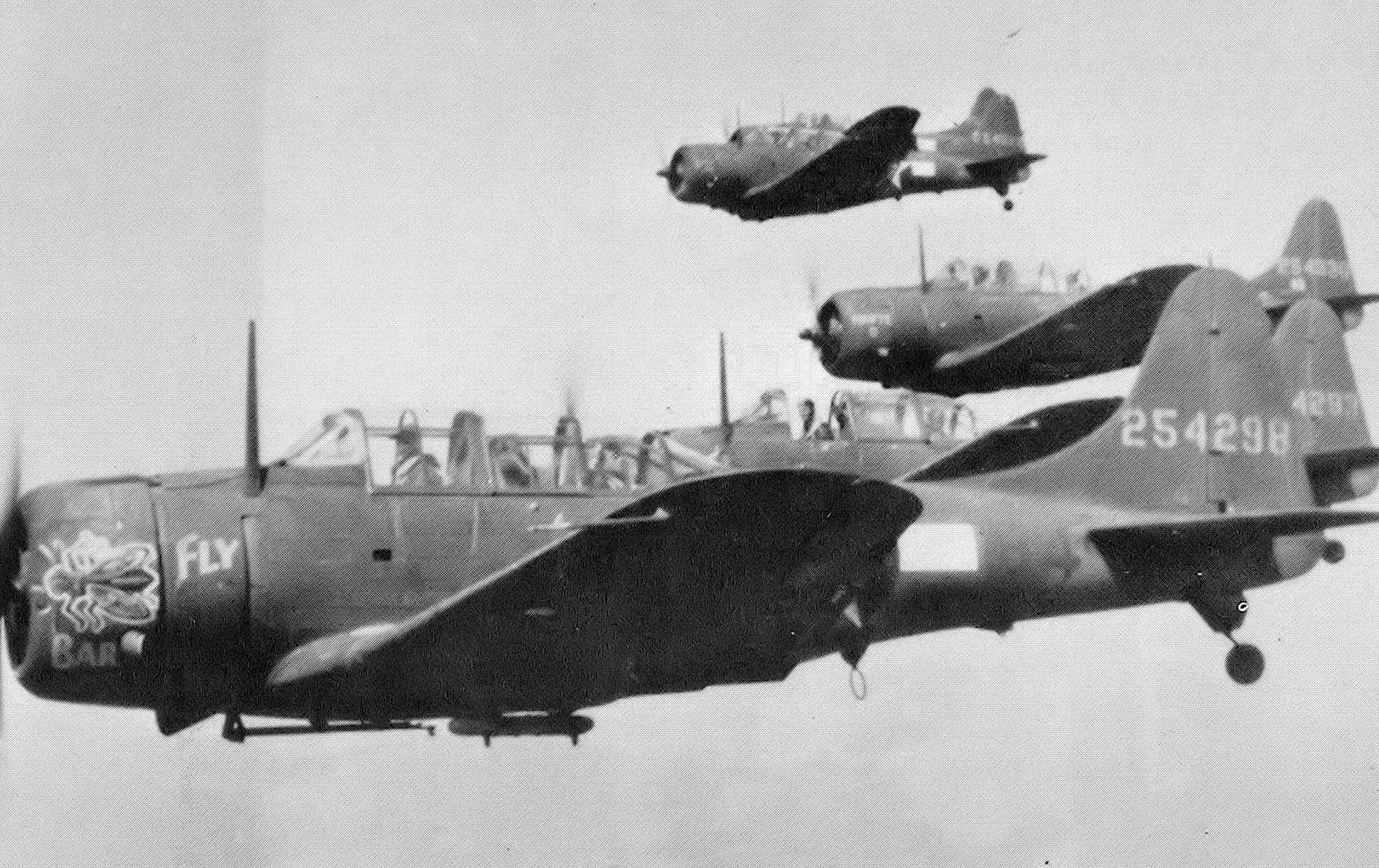
A-24 Banshees in an August 1943 attack against Kiska Island (Note: The formation includes Douglas A-24B-1-DT Banshees, serials 42-54298 (Bar Fly), 41-54293, and 41-54920 Baugher, Joe (19 April 2023). "1942 USAF Serial Numbers". Joe Baugher.)

The squadron was activated in late March 1943 at Drew Field, Florida as the 633d Bombardment Squadron, one of the four original squadrons of the 407th Bombardment Group. The squadron was equipped with Douglas A-24 Banshees. In July, the squadron's air echelon deployed to Amchitka Army Air Field, Alaska to reinforce Eleventh Air Force in Operation Cottage, an attack on Kiska, the last Japanese outpost in the Aleutian Islands. The first combat sorties by elements of the 407th Group were flown on 4 August 1943, in an attack against antiaircraft artillery batteries in the main Japanese camp. The returning crews reported only meager small arms and light automatic weapons fire. As it turned out, the Japanese had decided to evacuate Kiska, leaving the United States in control of the Aleutians, and the squadron was returned to its training base in Florida, under its new name, the 516th Fighter-Bomber Squadron.

After arriving in Florida, the squadron resumed training for deployment overseas, but was soon assigned the mission of acting as a Replacement Training Unit (RTU). The RTU was an oversized unit organized to provide final training for individual pilots or aircrews. Initially the squadron flew a mix of the A-36 Apache and early model P-51 versions of the Mustang fighter, but by the end of the year had become a Republic P-47 Thunderbolt training unit at Galveston Army Air Field, Texas.

However, the Army Air Forces were finding that standard military units like the 516th, which were manned based on relatively inflexible tables of organization were not proving well adapted to performing the training mission. Accordingly, it adopted a more functional system in which each base was organized into a separate numbered unit. The 516th, along with other elements of the 407th Group and supporting units at Galveston, was disbanded and replaced by the 269th AAF Base Unit (Replacement Training Unit, Fighter).

=== Strategic fighter operations ===
The squadron was reconstituted in December 1953 at Great Falls Air Force Base, Montana as the 516th Strategic Fighter Squadron, although it was initially undermanned and did not begin operational training with its Republic F-84 Thunderjets until June 1954. From August until November 1954, the squadron deployed to Misawa Air Base, Japan and provided air defense for the northern Japanese islands. Its parent 407th Strategic Fighter Wing was the last of Strategic Air Command's fighter wings to rotate through Misawa during and immediately after the Korean War. The squadron left its F-84Gs at Misawa and re-equipped with F-84F Thunderstreak swept-wing aircraft on return to Montana. It also operated a few RF-84F reconnaissance versions of the Thunderstreak. In July 1957, Strategic Air Command transferred its fighter aircraft to Tactical Air Command and the squadron was inactivated along with the rest of the 407th Wing.

== Lineage ==
- Constituted as the 633d Bombardment Squadron (Dive) on 23 March 1943

Activated on 28 March 1943
Redesignated 516th Fighter-Bomber Squadron on 10 August 1943
Disbanded on 1 April 1944

- Reconstituted and redesignated 516th Strategic Fighter Squadron on 13 November 1953

Activated on 18 December 1953
Inactivated on 1 July 1957

=== Assignments ===
- 407th Bombardment Group (later 407th Fighter-Bomber Group), 28 March 1943 – 1 April 1944
- 407th Strategic Fighter Wing, 18 December 1953 – 1 July 1957

=== Stations ===
- Drew Field, Florida, 28 March 1943 (operated from Amchitka Army Air Field), Alaska, July–August 1943)
- Lakeland Army Air Field, Florida, 2 October 1943
- Galveston Army Air Field, Texas, 9 November 1943 – 1 April 1944
- Great Falls Air Force Base, Montana, 18 December 1953 – 1 July 1957 (operated from Misawa Air Base, Japan, 8 August-10 November 1954)

=== Aircraft ===
- Douglas A-24 Banshee, 1943
- North American A-36 Apache, 1943
- North American P-51 Mustang, 1943
- Republic P-47 Thunderbolt, 1943–1944
- Republic F-84 Thunderjet, 1954–1957

=== Campaigns ===
Campaign Streamer	Campaign	Dates	Notes
	American Theater without inscription	28 March 1943 – 1 April 1944	633d Bombardment Squadron (later 516th Fighter-Bomber Squadron)
	Aleutian Islands	July 1943 – August 1943	633d Bombardment Squadron (later 516th Fighter-Bomber Squadron)
