= 517 Squadron =

517 Squadron or 517th Squadron may refer to:

- No. 517 Squadron RAF, a unit of the United Kingdom Royal Air Force
- 517th Airlift Squadron, a unit of the United States Air Force
- 517th Strategic Fighter Squadron, a unit of the United States Air Force
