= 515th =

515th may refer to:

- 515th Air Defense Group, disbanded United States Air Force (USAF) organization
- 515th Air Mobility Operations Wing (515 AMOW), part of Air Mobility Command, stationed at Hickam Air Force Base, Hawaii
- 515th Bombardment Squadron, inactive United States Air Force unit
- 515th Parachute Infantry Regiment (United States), Regiment of the US Army during the Second World War
- 515th Strategic Fighter Squadron, inactive United States Air Force unit

== See also ==
- 515 (number)
- 515 (disambiguation)
- 515, the year 515 (DXV) of the Julian calendar
- 515 BC
