= 635th Bombardment Squadron =

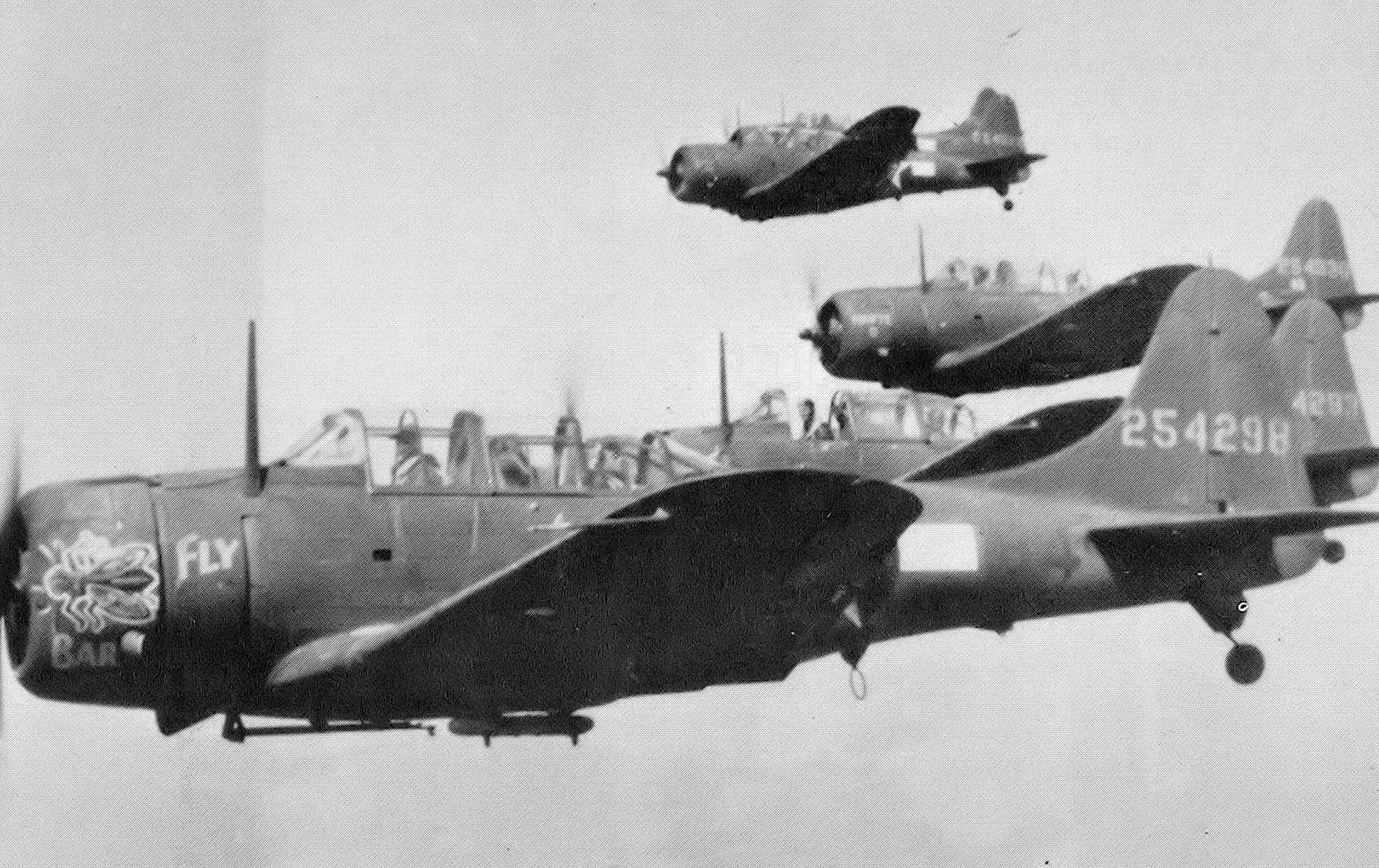
- Squadron A-24 Banshee dive bombers in an August 1943 attack against Kiska Island (Note: The formation includes Douglas A-24B-1-DT Banshees, serials 42-54298 (Bar Fly), 41-54293, and 41-54920 Baugher, Joe (19 April 2023). "1942 USAF Serial Numbers". Joe Baugher.)
- Active: March–August 1943
- Country: United States
- Branch: United States Air Force
- Role: dive bomber
- Engagements: Aleutian Islands Campaign

The 635th Bombardment Squadron is a disbanded United States Army Air Forces unit. The squadron was activated in March 1943 and equipped with light ground attack aircraft. In July 1943, the air echelon of the squadron deployed to the Aleutian Islands to defend against the Japanese attacks there. It was disbanded at Amchitka Army Air Field, Alaska, in August 1943, before returning to its home station in Florida.

== History ==
The squadron was activated at Drew Field, Florida in March 1943 as one of the original four squadrons of the 407th Bombardment Group, part of II Bomber Command. The squadron was equipped with Douglas A-24B Banshee dive bombers.

After the invasion of the Aleutian Islands, the squadron, along with the air echelon of the 407th Group, was relieved of its training mission and deployed to Amchitka Army Air Field, Alaska. There, it was tasked with reinforcing the Eleventh Air Force in Operation Cottage, an attack on Kiska, the last Japanese outpost in the Aleutian Islands. The first combat sorties by elements of the 407th Group were flown on 4 August 1943, in an attack against antiaircraft artillery batteries in the main Japanese camp. The returning crews reported only meager small arms and light automatic weapons fire.

While deployed to Alaska, the squadron was disbanded in August 1943, when the Army Air Forces reorganized its single engine dive bomber units as fighter bomber units and reduced the number of squadrons in a group from four to three. Its personnel and equipment were distributed among the other three squadrons of the 407th Group.

== Lineage ==
- Constituted as the 635th Bombardment Squadron (Dive) on 23 March 1943

Activated on 28 March 1943
Disbanded on 15 August 1943

=== Assignments ===
- 407th Bombardment Group, 28 March – 15 August 1943

=== Stations ===
- Drew Field, Florida, 28 March – 15 August 1943 (operated from Amchitka Army Air Field, Alaska after 19 July 1943)

=== Aircraft ===
- A-24 Banshee, 1943

=== Campaigns ===
Campaign Streamer	Campaign	Dates	Notes
	Aleutian Islands	19 July 1943 – 15 August 1943	635th Bombardment Squadron
