= 515 Athalia =

Minor planet (asteroid)

Discovery
- Discovered by: M. F. Wolf
- Discovery site: Heidelberg Obs.
- Discovery date: 20 September 1903

Designations
- Pronunciation: /æθəˈlaɪə/
- Named after: Athaliah (ancient queen consort)
- Alternative designations: 1903 ME · 1931 TQ; 1937 WO · 1937 WQ; 1937 WR · 1937 YH; 1953 TD · 1974 QA_{3} 1977 CF
- Minor planet category: main-belt · (outer); Themis

Orbital characteristics
- Epoch 4 September 2017 (JD 2458000.5)
- Uncertainty parameter 0
- Observation arc: 113.79 yr (41,562 days)
- Aphelion: 3.6671 AU
- Perihelion: 2.5797 AU
- Semi-major axis: 3.1234 AU
- Eccentricity: 0.1741
- Orbital period (sidereal): 5.52 yr (2,016 days)
- Mean anomaly: 178.72°
- Mean motion: 0° 10^{m} 42.96^{s} / day
- Inclination: 2.0376°
- Longitude of ascending node: 121.11°
- Argument of perihelion: 300.16°

Physical characteristics
- Dimensions: 32.75±10.79 km 33.47±10.06 km 38.22 km (SIMPS); 38.80±0.66 km 39.76±1.38 km 41.190±0.146 km 43.0±0.2 km 45.280±0.399 km
- Synodic rotation period: 10.636±0.001 h
- Geometric albedo: 0.0278±0.0045; 0.031±0.006; 0.037±0.003; 0.038±0.005; 0.039±0.004; 0.0390 (SIMPS); 0.06±0.03; 0.07±0.11
- Spectral type: Tholen = no classification possible SMASS = Cb; B–V = 0.875; U–B = 0.415
- Absolute magnitude (H): 10.6 · 10.76±0.26 · 10.89 · 11.23

515 Athalia, provisional designation 1903 ME, is a carbonaceous Themistian asteroid from the outer regions of the asteroid belt, approximately 40 kilometers in diameter. It was discovered on 20 September 1903, by German astronomer Max Wolf at the Heidelberg Observatory in southwest Germany. The asteroid was named after the ancient Judahite queen Athaliah.

== Orbit and classification ==
Athalia is a Themistian asteroid that belongs to the Themis family (602), a very large family of carbonaceous asteroids, named after 24 Themis. It orbits the Sun in the outer main belt at a distance of 2.6–3.7 AU once every 5 years and 6 months (2,016 days). Its orbit has an eccentricity of 0.17 and an inclination of 2°. The body's observation arc begins at Heidelberg with its official discovery observation in 1903.

== Physical characteristics ==
=== Spectral type ===
In the SMASS classification, the asteroid is a Cb-subtype, that transitions between the carbonaceous C-type to the B-type asteroids. In the Tholen classification, no type could be assigned to Athalia since its spectrum was inconsistent as it resembled that of an S-type asteroid, while its albedo was far too low for that spectral type.

=== Rotation period ===
In October 2015, a rotational lightcurve of Athalia was obtained from photometric observations by American astronomer Frederick Pilcher at the Organ Mesa Observatory (G50) in New Mexico, United States. Lightcurve analysis gave a well-defined rotation period of 10.636 hours with a brightness amplitude of 0.22 magnitude (U=3).

=== Diameter and albedo ===
According to the surveys carried out by the Japanese Akari satellite, the Spitzer Space Telescope and the Wide-field Infrared Survey Explorer with its subsequent NEOWISE mission, Athalia measures about 40 kilometers in diameter and its surface has an albedo of about 0.03 to 0.04.

The Collaborative Asteroid Lightcurve Link adopts the results obtained by the Infrared Astronomical Satellite IRAS, that is, an albedo of 0.039 and a diameter of 38.22 kilometers based on an absolute magnitude of 11.23.

== Naming ==
This minor planet was named after Athaliah (Athalia), the daughter of King Ahab and Queen Jezebel of Israel. The murderous queen of the ancient Kingdom of Judah was the only woman to ever rule the Hebrew kingdoms. The official naming citation was mentioned in The Names of the Minor Planets by Paul Herget in 1955 (H 55).
