= 515th Coast Artillery =

US Army regiment

The 515th Coast Artillery was a regiment of the United States Army first created in the early 1920s.

The regiment was constituted in the Organized Reserve on 2 July 1923 as the 515th Artillery Regiment (Antiaircraft) (Coast Artillery Corps), allotted to the Seventh Corps Area, and assigned to the General Headquarters Reserve. On 30 June 1924, it was redesignated the 515th Coast Artillery Regiment (Antiaircraft). The regiment was further allotted to Nebraska, and was organized in November 1924 with Headquarters at Lincoln, Headquarters and Combat Train, 1st Battalion, at Nebraska City, and Headquarters and Combat Train, 2nd Battalion, at Fairbury. The unit's primary Reserve Officers Training Corps "feeder school" for new lieutenants was the University of Nebraska, and assigned personnel usually conducted annual training with the 61st Coast Artillery Regiment at Fort Sheridan, Illinois. On 1 October 1933, the regiment was relieved from the GHQR and assigned to the 35th Coast Artillery Brigade of the Fourth Army. From August 1933 until December 1941, the commander of the regiment was Colonel Robert Leroy Cochran, who also served as the 24th governor of Nebraska from 1935 to 1941.

After the outbreak of the Pacific War on 7 December 1941, a "Provisional 200th CA (AA) Regiment of Manila" was established on 8 December 1941, initially with 20 officers and 500 enlisted men taken from the 200th Coast Artillery Regiment of the New Mexico National Guard that had been sent to the Philippines, to man anti-aircraft weapons previously stored in the Manila area. The 515th Coast Artillery was withdrawn 19 December 1941 from the Organized Reserve, allotted to the Regular Army, and the 515th Coast Artillery (Antiaircraft) was activated at Fort Stotsenburg. The regiment was augmented with about 750 officers and enlisted men of the Philippine Commonwealth Army for training. It was moved from Manila on 25 December (the day before Manila was declared an open city) to defend the withdrawal routes to Bataan, where the unit defended the Cabcaben airfield and other key points until surrendering as part of the Philippine Provisional Coast Artillery Brigade on 9 April 1942.

The 515th Coast Artillery (Antiaircraft) was inactivated on 2 April 1946 at Fort Mills, Philippine Islands. The regiment was redesignated on 1 August 1946 as the 515th Coast Artillery Battery and activated at Fort Winfield Scott, California. Inactivated 25 November 1946 at Fort Winfield Scott, California. The Headquarters and Headquarters Battery, 515th Antiaircraft Artillery Group, was organized and federally recognized on 25 September 1947 at Roswell, New Mexico, moved to Albuquerque in 1955, but then was consolidated with a number of other units into the reformed 200th Artillery on 1 September 1959. The 515th Support Battalion within the New Mexico Army National Guard now is the heir to the lineage of the 515th Coast Artillery.

== See also ==
- 515th Regiment (United States) - New Mexico National Guard regional training institute
