= 515th Regiment (United States) =

Training unit of New Mexico Army National Guard

The 515th Regiment (Regional Training Institute) is a training unit of the New Mexico Army National Guard, located at Santa Fe.

The 515th Regiment (RTI) is tasked to develop officers through the Officer Candidate School and train enlisted personnel through the Basic Leadership Course, Motor Transport Operator (88M) as One Army School System (OASS) for the Army National Guard, United States Army Reserve, and the active component. The Regiment will be compliant with Quality Assurance (QA) and oversight of aligned units.

== See also ==
- 515th Coast Artillery (United States)
- 515th Support Battalion
