= Amchitka Air Force Base =

US Air Force Base in Alaska (1943–44)

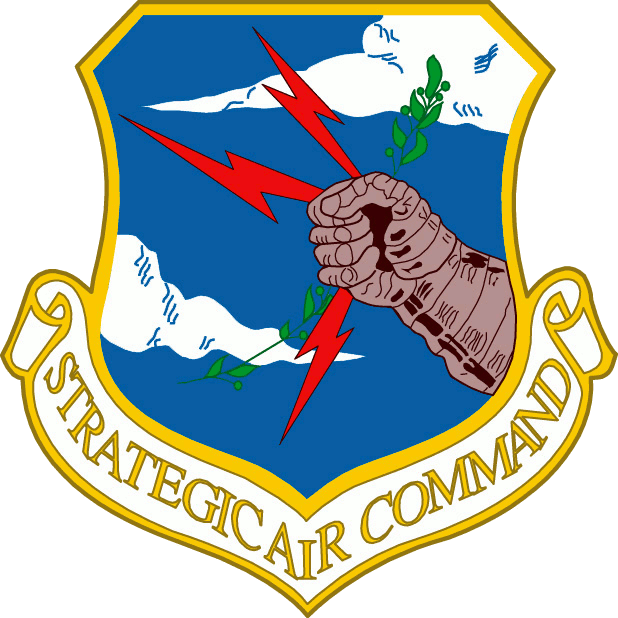
Amchitka Air Force Base Amchitka Army Airfield (A-3)
- Amchitka, Alaska

Site information
- Type: Military Airfield

Location
- Location within Alaska
- Coordinates: 51°22′37″N 179°15′32″E

Site history
- Built: 1942
- In use: 1943-1944
- Battles/wars: Aleutian Islands Campaign

Amchitka Air Force Base is an abandoned Air Force Base located on Amchitka, in the Rat Islands group of the Aleutian Islands in southwest Alaska.

== History ==
=== Aleutians campaign ===
The Aleutian Islands Campaign was not considered a priority by the Joint Chiefs of Staff in late 1942. British Prime Minister Churchill stated that sending forces to attack the Japanese presence there was a diversion from the North African Campaign and Admiral Chester Nimitz saw it as a diversion from his operations in the Central Pacific. Commanders in Alaska, however, believed the Japanese presence in the Aleutians a threat to the United States West Coast and once the islands were again in United States hands, forward bases could be established to attack Japan from there.

The establishment of Adak Army Airfield (Code Name A-2) in August 1942 gave the U.S. Army Air Forces a forward base from which to attack the Japanese forces on Kiska Island. Amchitka Island, being only 50 miles from Kiska and within range of occupied Attu Island was the next step in the American advance. Enough forces were scraped together from existing units and American forces made an unopposed landing on Amchitka on January 12, 1943, although the destroyer Worden (DD-352) grounded and sank with the loss of 14 lives.

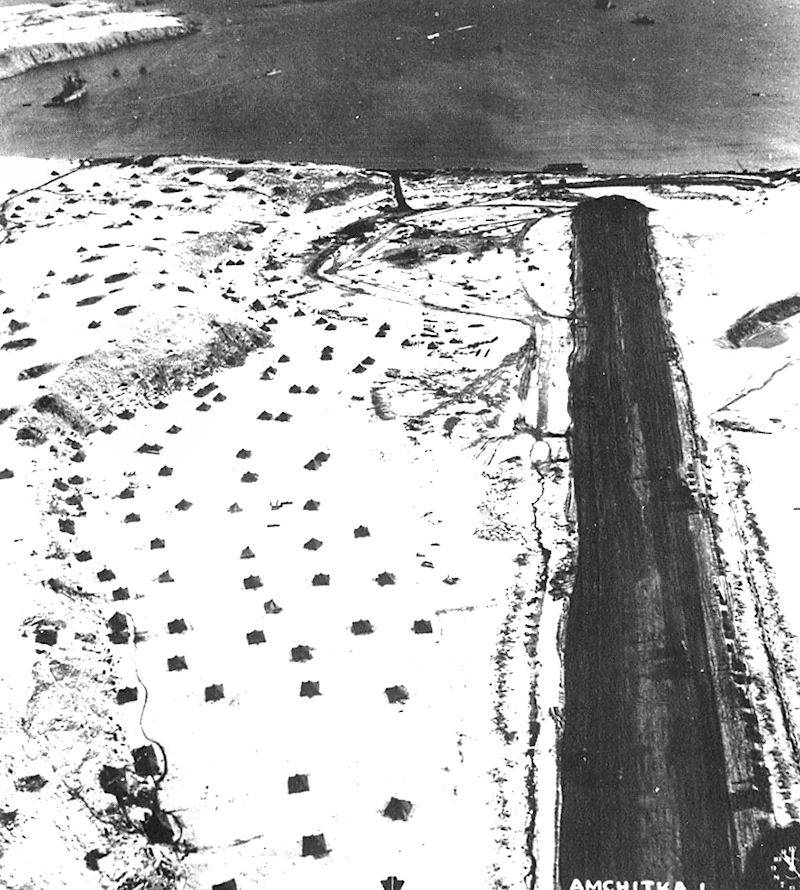
Amchitka Army Airfield, March 1943

Despite facing difficult weather conditions and continual bombing attacks from the Japanese, Army engineers managed to build a runway. As more troops were landed, heavy construction equipment was brought ashore. Frozen lakes were drained and the gravel scraped from their beds was used to lay down the bed for the runway. Navy Seabees also arrived and began to construct the harbor and dock facilities. Finally on 16 February, the construction of the runway at Amchitka (Code Name A-3) had progressed to the point where light fighters could be brought in. 18th Fighter Squadron P-40 Warhawks began to arrive from Adak and surprised the Japanese by launching counter-attacks to their raids from Kiska. Two Japanese light bombers were shot down over the airfield in full view of the construction engineers. In addition to the P-40s, several P-38 Lightnings arrived.

The adverse weather conditions included much fog and this caused the loss of many aircraft. To counter this Fog Investigation and Dispersal Operation (FIDO) was installed on runway Baker (the bomber runway) and it became operational in mid-June 1944. It was used on several occasions, allowing successful take-off and landing in foggy conditions that would otherwise have prevented safe operations.

With its establishment, the Alaska Command was now 80 km (50 mi) away from their target, Kiska. The military eventually built numerous buildings, roads, and a total of three airstrips on the island, some of which would later be renovated and used by the Atomic Energy Commission in the 1960s. At its peak, the occupancy of Amchitka Army Airfield reached 15,000 troops.

Known USAAF units assigned to Amchitka AAF were:

- HQ IX Bomber Command, 24 June – 4 September 1943
- HQ 343d Fighter Group, 25 July 1943 – 22 January 1944
- 11th Fighter Squadron, 27 March – 17 May 1943; 23 March 1944 – July 1945 (P-40 Warhawk)
- 18th Fighter Squadron, 15 February 1943 – 28 March 1944 (P-40 Warhawk, P-38 Lightning)
- 54th Fighter Squadron, 12 March – 18 October 1943 (P-38 Lightning)
- 344th Fighter Squadron, May–July 1943 (P-40 Warhawk, P-38 Lightning)
- 632d Bombardment Squadron (Dive), 19 July – 15 August 1943 (A-24 Banshee)
- 633d Bombardment Squadron (Dive), 19 July – 15 August 1943 (A-24 Banshee)
- 635th Bombardment Squadron (Dive), 19 July – 15 August 1943 (A-24 Banshee)
- 21st Bombardment Squadron, 18 February – July 1943, (LB-30, B-24 Liberator)
- 36th Bombardment Squadron, 4 May – 13 September 1943 (B-24 Liberator)
- 73d Bombardment Squadron, March–April 1943; June – 30 August 1943 (B-25 Mitchell, B-26 Marauder)
- 77th Bombardment Squadron, 11 September 1943 – 11 February 1944 (B-25 Mitchell, B-26 Marauder)
- 404th Bombardment Squadron, 4 June 1943 – 26 February 1944 (B-24 Liberator)

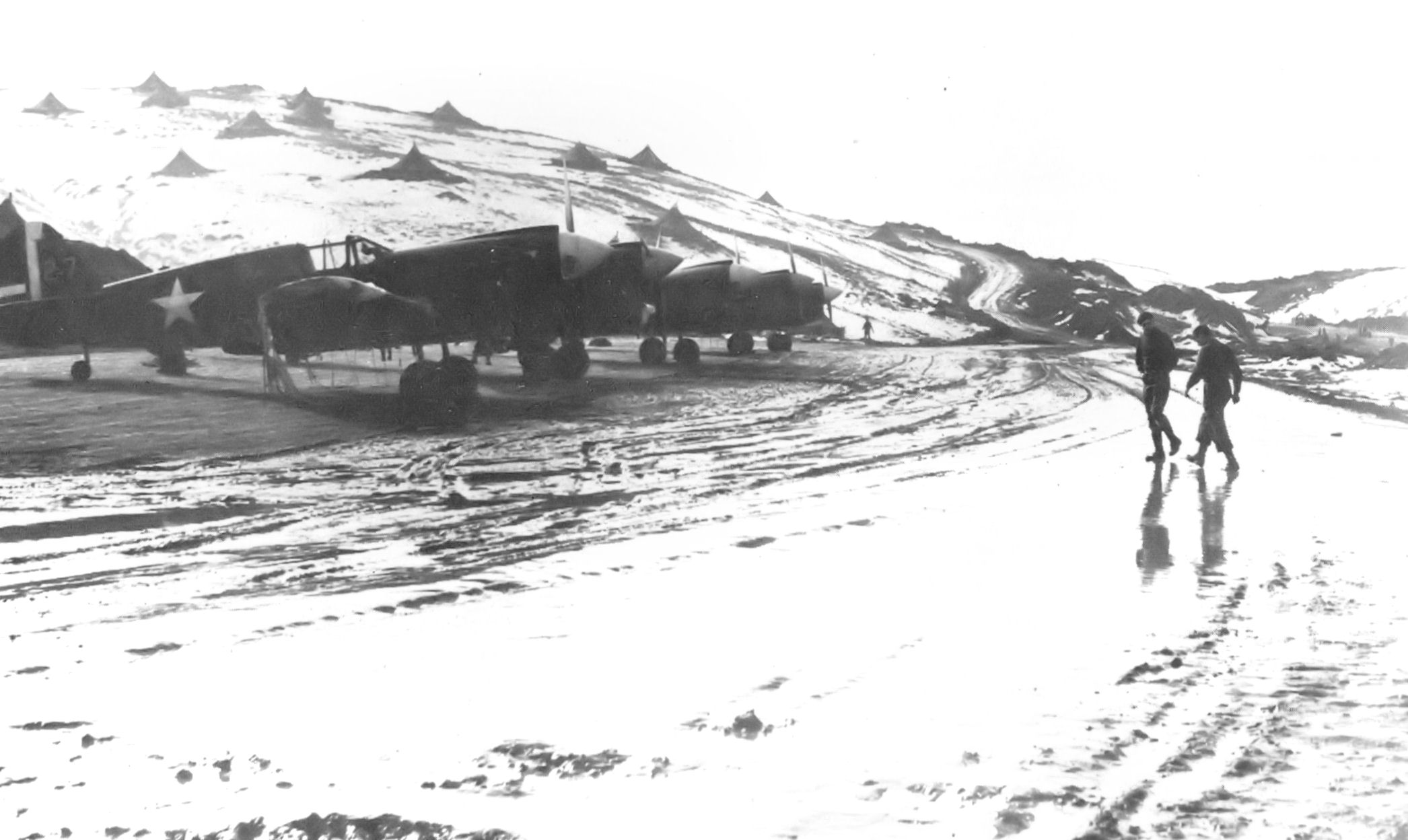
18th Fighter Squadron P-40s, March 1943. Note the personnel tents on the hill to the north of the aircraft.

With the establishment of an American base on Amchitka, the Japanese forces on Kiska Island were put into an untenable situation. The Battle of the Komandorski Islands, fought on 27 March 1943, sealed their fate. The Japanese, in an attempt to reinforce and resupply their garrison on Attu had dispatched three transports which were escorted by nine warships. They were intercepted by United States Naval forces which consisted of One heavy and one light cruisers along with four destroyers. The battle at first was being won by the Japanese, however the Japanese commander lost his nerve when he feared American bombers on Amchitka, based on intercepted American radio signals, were preparing to attack. He ordered his fleet to return to Japan. However, his fears proved groundless as the American aircraft were being prepared for a raid on Kiska island. Without unloading the bombers and adding external tanks, the 73d Bombardment Squadron North American B-25 Mitchells and Martin B-26 Marauders on Amchitka would have insufficient range to attack the Japanese in the battle area. This amounted to a strategic defeat, as it ended Japanese attempts to resupply the Aleutian garrisons. The Japanese, however, did manage to send a few destroyers and submarines into their bases on Kiska and Attu with supplies and additional troops. The fact was, for all intents and purposes, that the Americans had essentially isolated the Japanese forces in the Aleutians and their days were numbered.

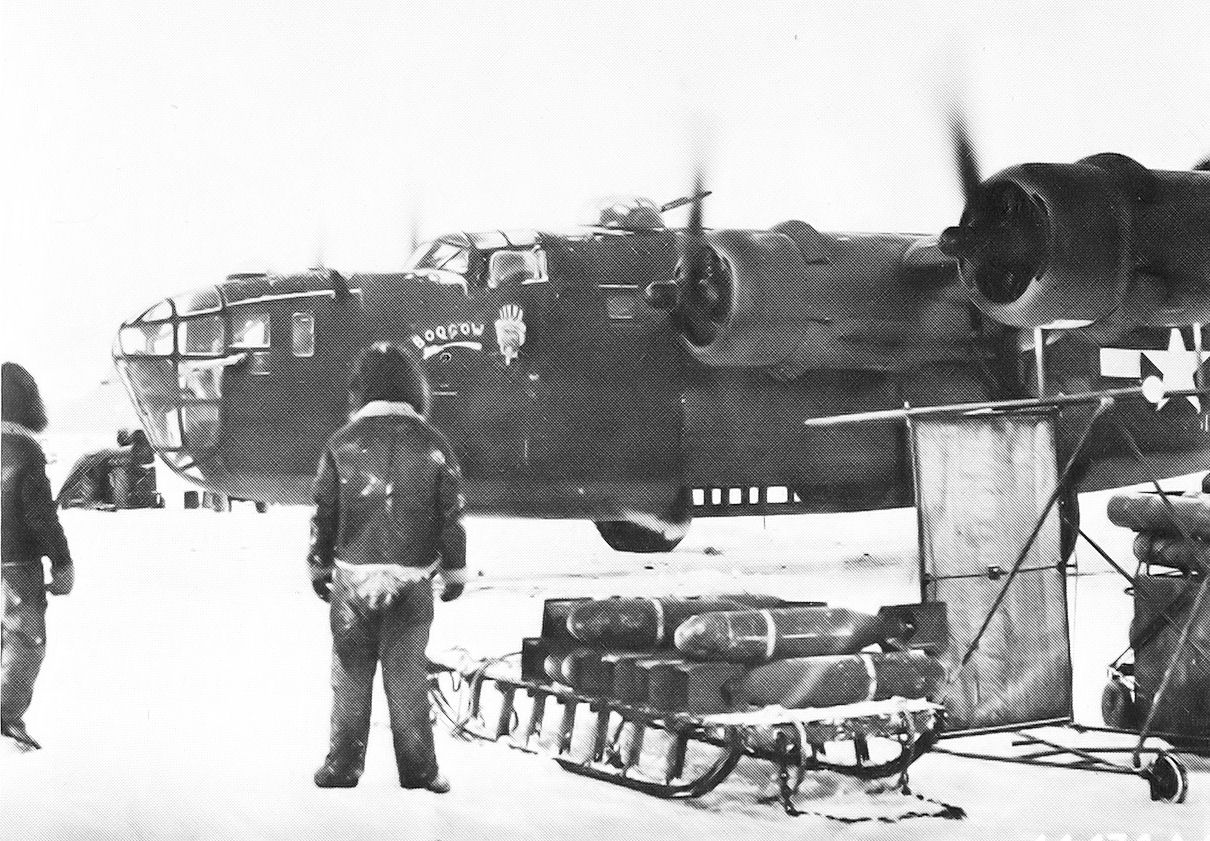
21st Bomb Squadron B-24 Liberators at Amchitka. Notice the sleds being used to transport bombs to the aircraft in the snow.

From its bases on Amchitka and Adak, Eleventh Air Force conducted continual bombing raids on the Japanese on Kiska and Attu. Long-range B-24 Liberator heavy bombers were moved down from mainland Alaskan bases to operate in the Aleutians which enabled Air Force commanders to send the bombers with full loads to Attu, while the B-25 and B-26 medium bombers attacked Kiska several times each day. Between 1 April and 11 May, the Eleventh Air Force bombers and fighters, joined by PBYs of Navy Fleet Wing Four reached its highest peak of operational activity during its bombing campaign. Most attacks were directed against Kiska because of Attu being weathered in. The close proximity of Amchitka allowed the fighters to participate in the attacks and run low-level sweeps over the Japanese positioned on Kiska. P-38 Lightnings also carried two 500-pound or occasionally one 1,000-pound bomb and employing glide-bombing tactics went after specific targets such as hangars and fuel tanks; the B-24 bombers dropped their loads on wide area targets. Fighters also carried out attacks using 20-pound fragmentation and incendiary bombs.

Air support for the Battle of Attu, which took place from 11 to 30 May 1943, was carried out from Amchitka. The battle, which lasted for more than two weeks, ended when most of the Japanese defenders were killed in brutal hand-to-hand combat after a final banzai charge broke through American lines.

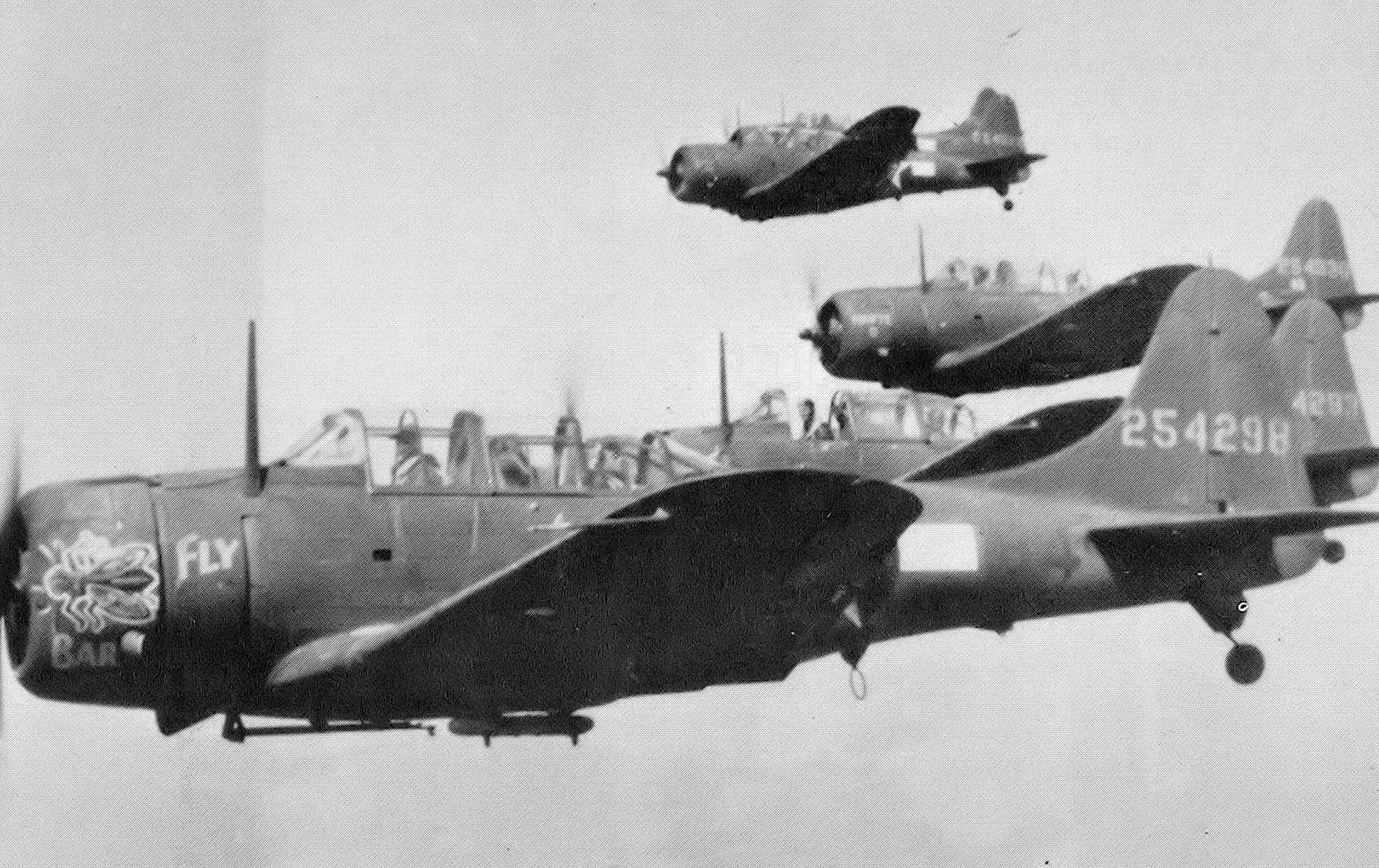
A-24 Banshee dive bombers of the 635th Bombardment Squadron carrying out an attack on Kiska Island on August 4, 1943

Air attacks on the Japanese on Kiska continued from Adak and Amchitka, with the culmination being the unopposed United States landing on Kiska on 15 August. Due to the heavy casualties suffered at Attu Island, planners were expecting another costly operation. However, incessant and continual air attacks since April had reduced the Japanese forces defenses considerably and the Japanese tactical planners had realized the isolated island was no longer defensible and evacuated the island.

The Aleutian Islands campaign was successfully completed on August 24, 1943. In that month, a strategic intercept station was established on the island, which remained until February 1945. Most combat squadrons were withdrawn by early 1944, the 11th Fighter Squadron becoming the headquarters garrison of the base until the end of the war. The mission of Amchitka AAB was that of a communications facility and also refueling for support and combat aircraft headed to and from Alexai Point Army Airfield on Attu and Shemya Army Airfield where long-range B-24 Liberator bombing attacks were carried out on Sakhalin and the Kuril Islands of northern Japan.

=== Amchitka Air Force Base ===
On 1 July 1947 the Aleutian Section of Alaskan Air Command was inactivated and Amchitka AAF was reassigned to Strategic Air Command. Under SAC control, the field's mission was to provide refueling to SAC long range aircraft and to Air Transport Command (Later MATS) cargo flights between Japan and the Continental United States. The base also compiled data by the 11th Weather Squadron, Air Weather Service, and assisted in Air Rescue and Recovery missions. The base had one C-47 permanently assigned. It was re designated Amchitka Air Force Base with the establishment of the United States Air Force in September 1947. SAC Operations ceased at Amchitka in February 1949 when the base was put into a caretaker status. On 31 December 1949 the base was closed due to insufficient personnel and staff. The Army closed its communications facility at Amchitka in August 1950. On 31 December 1950 the 2107th Air Weather Group pulled the last of its personnel out of Amchitka and the facility was abandoned.

The site later hosted an Air Force White Alice telecommunication system in 1959 to 1961, and a temporary relay station in the 1960s and 1970s.

== Current status ==
Amchitka Air Force Base today is largely intact, although abandoned in most part for the past sixty years. Runways, taxiways, aircraft parking dispersal revetments remain along with a large support base with deteriorating buildings. Due to its remote location, it rests undisturbed with ice and snow covering the base most of the year, exposed to the elements in the short summers. It is almost constantly under a cloud cover and fog generally obscures the area.

The main World War II runway (07/23) was extended to 8,000 feet by SAC after the war to accommodate B-29s and MATS intercontinental transports 51°22′37″N 179°15′32″E. A 6,000 ft secondary, crosswind runway was later constructed 51°22′45″N 179°18′32″E. It appears that SAC or MATS received funding for a third 7,000-foot runway to the north side of the main airfield after the war 51°23′17″N 179°15′58″E.

To the south of the main World War II runway are numerous taxiways and a large number of aircraft revetments, likely dating from the Aleutian Campaign 51°22′16″N 179°15′31″E. The aircraft parking is dispersed over a wide area almost to the south shore of the island connected by a taxiway and road network. As the airfield was attacked on several occasions by Japanese aircraft, the wide dispersal was needed for defense. Under the snow cover likely are a large number of anti-aircraft artillery sites, the remains of ammo dumps and other facilities. To the east of the secondary crosswind runway are a series of personnel billeting or aircraft technical sites 51°23′05″N 179°21′02″E 51°23′00″N 179°21′58″E and what appears to be a port facility 51°22′48″N 179°23′21″E.

To the north of the main World War II runway are a large number of roads and what appear to be Quonset huts. Also the remains of temporary World War II aircraft maintenance hangars are visible in the snow. Many personnel billeting sites consisting again of Quonset hut are dispersed to the north and east of the main runway, along the south side of an inlet 51°23′51″N 179°19′11″E

To the north of the 3d runway is likely the location of the postwar SAC/MATS Amchitka Air Force Base. In the mid-1960s, the Atomic Energy Commission (AEC) used Amchitka for a series of underground nuclear tests. The large number of access roads and Quonset huts are intermixed with new facilities built in the 1960s by the AEC which apparently used the old AFB as its main base station. Along with the numerous huts are a significant number of permanent buildings, large aircraft hangars 51°23′38″N 179°16′23″E and a substantial port facility 51°24′29″N 179°17′29″E. The northern extend of the base likely goes north to 51°23′38″N 179°14′24″E, south of which is an intermixing of former Air Force buildings and AEC structures. It was an expansive and large base consisting of several hundred buildings, all of which remains largely intact and abandoned. No evidence of an Air Traffic Control Tower has been located. The postwar White Alice Site appears to be at 51°24′56″N 179°17′29″E

A new 5,000 ft airfield (01/19) was constructed at 51°26′38″N 179°08′05″E and the #3 Air Force runway was refurbished in the 1960s. The AEC built a series of roads, base camp facilities and support buildings for the nuclear workers over the south part of the island in a similar manner to the Nevada Test Site. A total of three nuclear tests, Long Shot, (1965) 51°26′12″N 179°10′47″E, Milrow (1969) 51°24′56″N 179°10′47″E, and Cannikin (1971) 51°28′10″N 179°06′12″E were performed, spurring the Don't Make A Wave Committee environmental protests.

The AEC withdrew from the island in 1973 and their facilities were abandoned. The remnants of the AEC facilities are visible over a wide area, generally north of the former AFB. The Department of Energy continues to monitor the site as part of their remediation program. This is expected to continue until 2025, after which the site is intended to become a restricted access wildlife preserve.

== In popular culture ==
- In the 1955 motion picture Strategic Air Command, Amchitka AFB is noted as a refueling stop for B-47 Bombers being deployed from the United States to Japan.

== See also ==
- Alaska World War II Army Airfields
