= Scholes International Airport at Galveston =

Scholes International Airport at Galveston (former Galveston Army Air Field)

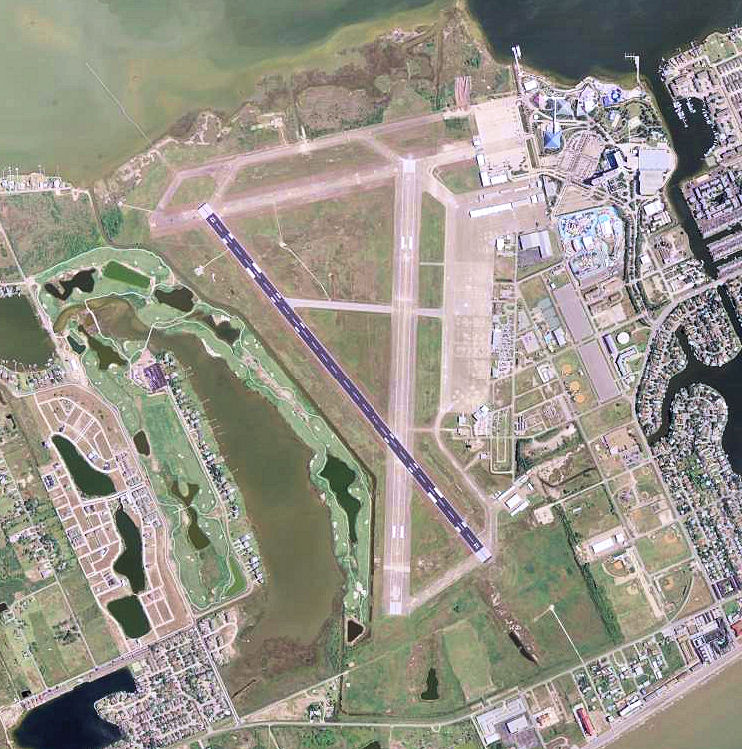
- USGS 2006 orthophoto
- IATA: GLS; ICAO: KGLS; FAA LID: GLS; WMO: 72242

Summary
- Airport type: Public
- Owner: City of Galveston
- Serves: Galveston, Texas
- Elevation AMSL: 6 ft (1.8 m)
- Coordinates: 29°15′55″N 094°51′38″W
- Website: www.GalvestonAirport.com

Map
- Location within Texas Location within the United States

Runways
Direction	Length		Surface
Direction	ft	m	Surface
14/32	6,000	1,829	Asphalt/Concrete
18/36	6,001	1,829	Concrete

Statistics (2023)
- Aircraft operations (year ending 4/6/2023): 49,448
- Based aircraft: 128
- Source: Federal Aviation Administration

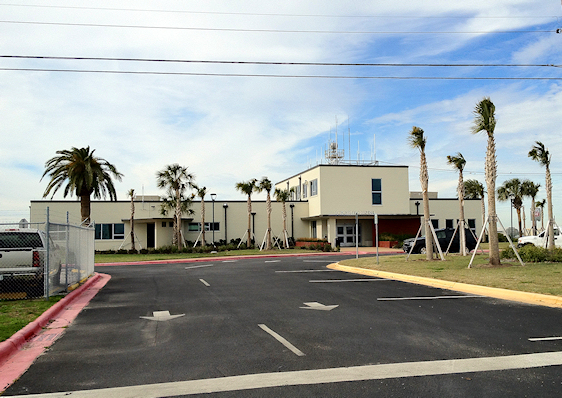
Terminal Building, 2012. Building was gutted and remodeled due to flood damage by Hurricane Ike in 2008.

Scholes International Airport at Galveston (IATA: GLS, ICAO: KGLS, FAA LID: GLS) is three miles southwest of Galveston, in Galveston County, Texas, United States. The National Plan of Integrated Airport Systems for 2011–2015 categorized it as a reliever airport.

The airport provides charter service and has no scheduled flights; the runways can accommodate airplanes as large as the Boeing 767-200.

== Overview ==
Operated and maintained by the City of Galveston, GLS is a general aviation airport. It has seen several airlines; from the 1930s until 1953-54 Braniff flew to Houston International (later named William P. Hobby Airport). Trans-Texas Airways "TTa", the forerunner to Texas International Airlines, arrived in the 1950s; until 1972 TTa Convair 600s flew nonstop to both Houston and Beaumont/Port Arthur and direct to Dallas and Austin. Later Galveston was served by Houston Metro Airlines De Havilland of Canada DHC-6 Twin Otters to Houston Intercontinental Airport (IAH), some stopping at Clear Lake City (CLC airport) near the NASA Johnson Space Center. A commuter airline, Texas Airlines, also served the airport in the mid-1980s with Piper Navajos to Houston Intercontinental Airport.

The airport's Master Plan considers the potential return of airline service as well as the trend of corporate aircraft and oil industry helicopter activity. In preparation for increased corporate activity, the plan considers the extension of the primary runway (18/36) from 6000 X 150 ft (46 m). to 7,100 feet (2,200 m). It can now accommodate aircraft as large as a Boeing 767.

GLS has air traffic control 12 hours a day (0600-1800), with direct clearance delivery service to Houston TRACON after the tower is closed. The Class D surface area changes to Class E and airport is uncontrolled. Airport lighting includes HIRL, MIRL, MALSR, REIL's and PAPI's as well as lighted taxiway and runway signage. It has an "A" ARFF Index. The 1,200-acre (4.9 km^{2}) airport offers a terminal, a 24-hour fixed-base operator, 24-hour weather services, a U.S. Customs agent on call, and state-of-the-art navigational aids with precision approaches providing all-weather capabilities. It is a fairly popular fueling stop for transient military aircraft due to a Military Operations Area in the Gulf of Mexico, and it is the destination for air ambulances transferring patients to the Shriner's Burn Hospital for Children.

Of the 220+ aircraft based at GLS, 50+ are helicopters belonging to Bristow, Era, PHI and other oil industry vendors.

The Lone Star Flight Museum was at the airport from 1985 until 2017.

== History ==
In the early 1920s the present Galveston airport location began to be used for aircraft operations, by Bob Scholes and Fen Waters, among others), who were some of the earliest aircraft operators in Texas (both of whom were flying before the issuance of pilot licenses. Soon after, the City of Galveston ordered them to cease providing rides and aerobatic demonstrations, in their Hisso-Suiza converted, former OX-5 powered Standard for which they were using East Beach as a runway surface. Fen Waters was offered the use of what is the present airport property, by a friend whose family operated a cattle ranch and watermelon farm.

The Galveston Municipal Airport name dates back to 1931. For a time it was named Corrigan Airport in 1938 for Douglas "Wrong Way" Corrigan, a Galveston native.

During World War II, it was re-designated a United States Army Air Corps base and named "Galveston Army Air Field", United States Army Corps of Engineers, using funds made available by Congress through the Civil Aeronautics Authority, constructed three 6,000-foot (1,800 m)-long, hard-surface runways at the airport to accommodate army aircraft.

In January 1943, Galveston Army Air Field was officially activated had the 46th Bombardment Group flying the Douglas A-20 Havoc in the anti-submarine role in the Gulf of Mexico until replaced by the 10th Antisubmarine Squadron, flying RM-37 Lockheed Venturas.

The Field was primarily used for replacement crew gunnery training by the 407th Fighter-Bomber Group, with targets being towed to the gunnery range at nearby Oyster Bay. The installation cost $7 million and at its peak had some 2,500 personnel assigned.

It was deactivated on November 15, 1945, with ownership reverting to the City of Galveston. The existing terminal was completed in 1949 and renamed Scholes Field in honor of Airport Manager and aviation pioneer, Robert "Bob" Scholes. As late as 1948, it was an active seaplane base per Sectional Aeronautical chart SA SAC O-5.

The airport has in the past offered airline services to Houston on Texas International Airlines.

== Facilities ==
Scholes International Airport covers 966 acres (391 ha) at an elevation of 6 feet (2 m). It has two runways: 14/32 is 6,000 by 150 feet (1,829 x 46 m) asphalt/concrete; 18/36 is 6,001 by 150 feet (1,829 x 46 m) concrete.

In the year ending April 6, 2023 the airport had 49,448 aircraft operations, average 135 per day: 84% general aviation, 14% air taxi, and 2% military. In April 2023, 128 aircraft were based at the airport: 81 single-engine, 6 multi-engine, 6 jet, and 35 helicopter.

=== Regular traffic ===
Light general aviation aircraft, and the occasional transient business jets can be seen at GLS.

The most frequent traffic is that of the helicopters that support the offshore oil and gas industry operating in the Gulf of Mexico. These large Part 135 helicopter operators include:

- Bristow U.S. LLC flying Sikorsky S-92s, Sikorsky S-76s, Agusta Westland AW 139s, Eurocopter EC 135s, Bell 407s and Bell 206L-4s. Bristow US is part of Bristow Group which is one of the largest commercial helicopter operators in the world.
- ERA flying Agusta A-119s, Eurocopter EC-135s, Sikorsky S-61s;
- PHI (Petroleum Helicopters Inc.) flying Bell JetRangers, Messerschmidt BO-105s, Eurocopter EC-135s, Sikorsky S-76s.

== Accidents and incidents ==
- On April 30, 1974, a Metro Airlines Beechcraft Model 99 crashed after takeoff because the captain in his haste left the trim stabilizer in the standby position. One crewmember and 5 passengers out of the 12 occupants were killed.
- On December 22, 2025, a Mexican Navy Beechcraft Super King Air operating an air ambulance flight from Merida, Mexico crashed into West Galveston Bay while on approach in heavy fog. At least 6 of the 8 occupants onboard were killed.

== Lone Star Flight Museum ==
The Lone Star Flight Museum, which was located at Scholes from 1985 until 2017, maintains a fleet of air worthy warbirds including: Vega B-17 Flying Fortress, North American B-25 Mitchell Bomber, Douglas SBD Dauntless, Republic P-47 Thunderbolt, Vought F4U Corsair, General Motors (Eastern Aircraft) TBM Avenger, Grumman F6F Hellcat, Grumman F8F Bearcat, General Motors FM-2 Wildcat, Supermarine Spitfire, Hawker Hurricane, North American AT-6 Texan, Beech AT-11 Kansan, Cessna AT-17 Bobcat, Stinson L-5, Douglas DC-3 Sky Train, and Stearman PT-17.

The Lone Star Flight Museum moved to nearby Ellington Airport in September 2017.

== See also ==
- List of airports in Texas
- Lone Star Flight Museum
- Texas World War II Army Airfields
