= 11th Operational Weather Squadron =

- Active: 1941 – 1957; 1958 – 1992; 1999 – 2008
- Country: United States
- Branch: United States Air Force
- Part of: Air Force Weather Agency; 611th Air Operations Group
- Duty Assignment: Elmendorf AFB, Alaska
- Colors: Blue & Yellow
- Decorations: Army Meritorious Unit Commendation; Air Force Outstanding Unit Award

Insignia
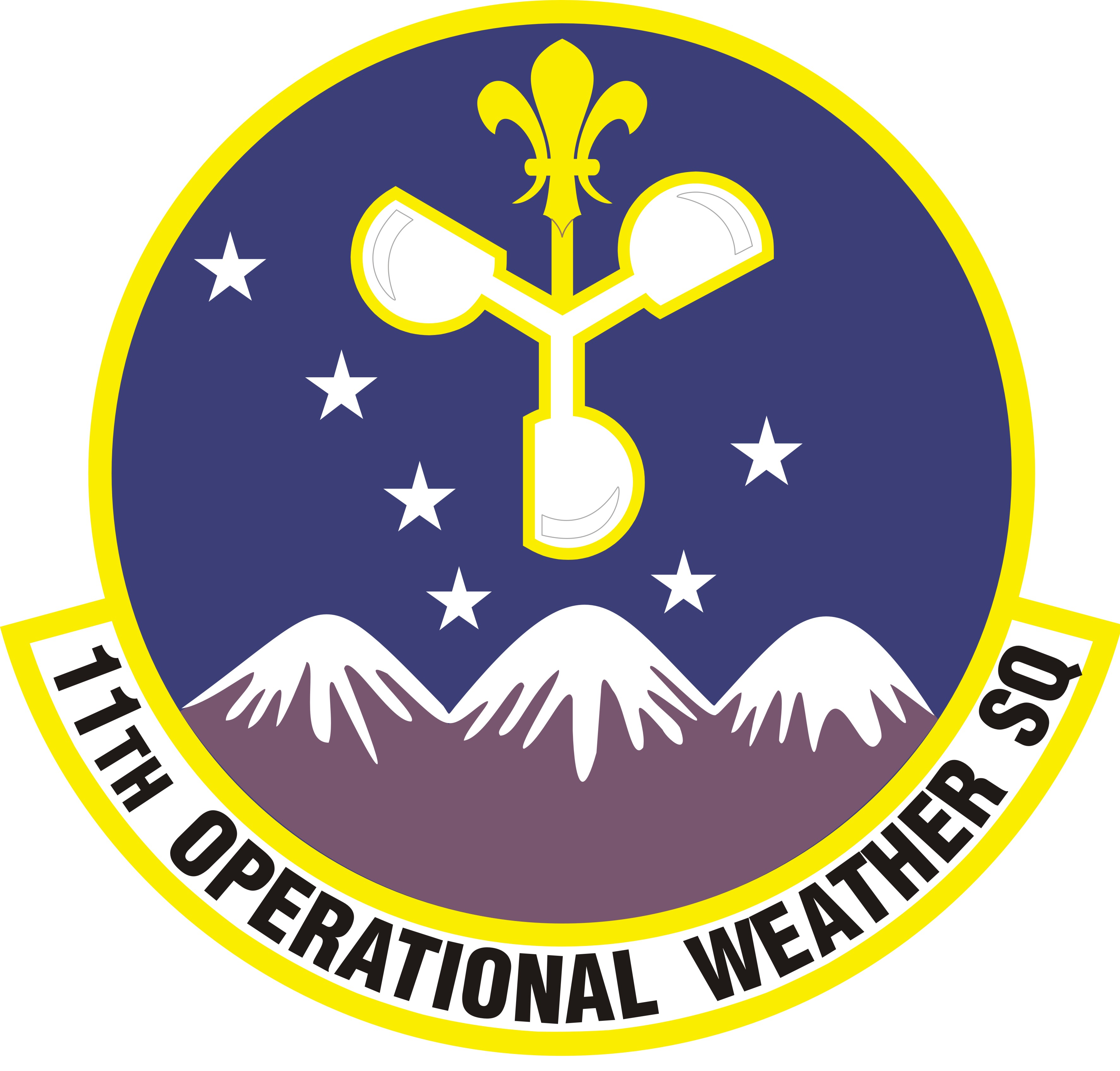
- 11th Operational Weather Squadron emblem (approval date unknown)

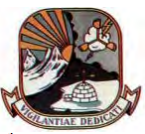
- 11th Weather Squadron emblem (approved 13 June 1961)

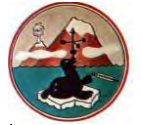
- 11th Weather Squadron emblem (approved 20 September 1944)

The 11th Operational Weather Squadron (11OWS) was an operational weather squadron of the United States Air Force. The squadron was based out of Elmendorf AFB, Alaska, and was responsible for forecasting Alaska's weather and analyzing its climate.

The squadron was first activated in early 1941 as the Air Corps Detachment, Weather, Alaska at Ladd Field. It was soon moved to Elmendorf Field (later Air Force Base). The detachment oversaw weather stations in Alaska and after the Attack on Pearl Harbor in February 1942 became the 11th Air Corps Squadron, Weather. The squadron was redesignated the 11th Weather Squadron in 1944. In 1952 the squadron was relocated to Keesler Air Force Base in Mississippi where it inactivated five years later. In 1958 the squadron was reactivated at Elmendorf. The squadron was inactivated after a short stay at Eielson Air Force Base in 1992. The squadron was reactivated as the 11th Operational Weather Squadron at Elmendorf in 1998.

== History ==
=== World War II ===
The 11th Operational Weather Squadron was constituted as Air Corps Detachment, Weather, Alaska, on 15 November 1940, and activated on 11 January 1941 at Ladd Field, Alaska, assigned to the Ninth Service Command. The detachment was commanded by Captain Wilson H. Neal and consisted of a Technical sergeant and five other enlisted men, transferred from March Field. Its mission was to operate the Alaska Weather Region to provide Army Air Corps aircraft and Alaska Army units with weather service. The detachment relocated to Elmendorf Field on 2 May. On 7 December, when the Japanese attacked Pearl Harbor, the detachment oversaw the weather stations at Elmendorf, Ladd, Annette Island, and Yakutat, a total of 44 enlisted men and three officers.

The squadron was redesignated the 11th Air Corps Squadron, Weather, on 26 February 1942 and transferred to the 11th Air Force. On 28 May, it activated a weather station at Fort Glenn. In October, the squadron activated a weather station at Adak and its remotest station at St. Matthew Island. Now-Lieutenant Colonel Neal was transferred and replaced by Major Paul A. Carlson in November. A station at Amchitka was activated on 24 January 1943. After the American liberation of Attu in May, the squadron established a weather station at Alexai Point on the island. The Adak and Alexai Point stations provided forecasts for a number of bombing raids against Paramushir in the summer. By the end of 1943, the squadron controlled 32 weather stations, manned by 81 officers, seven NCOs, and 447 enlisted men, its peak strength. On 6 January 1944, the squadron became the 11th Weather Squadron. In February, both weathermen and a radio operator at the Chuginadak station died of exposure while searching for a supply barge which had run aground on the island. During the war, three men of the squadron received the Distinguished Flying Cross, seventeen received the Bronze Star, three were awarded the Army Commendation Medal, and five were awarded the Air Medal. The squadron was transferred to the Army Air Forces Weather Service (later the Air Weather Service) on 22 October 1945.

=== Cold War ===
On 4 December 1945, the squadron became part of the 7th Weather Group (later the 2107th Air Weather Group). On 20 April 1952, the squadron was relocated to Keesler Air Force Base in Mississippi, becoming part of the Air Weather Service. A month later it became part of the 8th Weather Group. The squadron was inactivated at Keesler on 18 November 1957. The squadron returned to Elmendorf and was reactivated on 18 June 1958, replacing the 7th Weather Group. On 1 June 1959, the squadron became part of the 4th Weather Wing. It was transferred to the 3rd Weather Wing on 30 June 1972. Between 20 January and 1 February 1989, elements of the squadron participated in Exercise Brim Frost 89, training Joint Task Force-Alaska against invasion. The squadron became part of the 1st Weather Wing on 1 October 1989. It was reassigned to Pacific Air Forces on 30 September 1991, when weather squadrons of Air Weather Service were transferred to the commands they supported. The squadron relocated to Eielson Air Force Base on 1 April 1992, becoming part of the 343d Operations Group on 15 April. The squadron was inactivated on 1 June.

=== Operational Weather Squadron ===
The squadron was redesignated the 11th Operational Weather Squadron on 5 February 1999, and activated on 19 February 1999 with the 611th Air Operations Group. The squadron provided mission tailored, operational, and tactical level meteorological, geological, oceanographic, and space environment products and services for Department of Defense air and land operations in the Alaskan region. They provided headquarters staff support to the Alaskan Command, Eleventh Air Force, PACAF, and U.S. Army Alaska, and contingency support to the Alaska NORAD Region. As a result of USAF manpower and budget reductions, the 11th OWS was inactivated and merged with the 17th Operational Weather Squadron in Hawaii in June 2008. This merger was completed on 13 June 2008.

== Lineage ==
The lineage of the 11th Operational Squadron from inception to 2008:

- Constituted as Air Corps Detachment, Weather, Alaska, on 15 November 1940

Activated on 11 January 1941

- Redesignated 11th Air Corps Squadron, Weather (Regional Control) on 26 February 1942
- Redesignated 11th Weather Squadron on 6 January 1944

Inactivated on 20 April 1952
Activated on 20 April 1952
Inactivated on 18 November 1957
Activated on 18 June 1958
Inactivated on 1 June 1992

- Redesignated 11th Operational Weather Squadron on 5 February 1999

Activated on 19 February 1999

- Inactivated and merged with 17th Operational Weather Squadron on 13 June 2008

=== Assignments ===
The assignments of the 11th Operational Squadron from inception to 2008:

- Ninth Service Command, 11 January 1941 – c. 1941
- Alaska Defense Force, c. 1941
- Eleventh Air Force, 26 February 1942
- AAF Weather Service, 22 October 1945
- 7th Weather (later, 2107th Air Weather) Group, 4 December 1945
- Air Weather Service, 20 April 1952
- 8th Weather Group, 20 May 1952 – 18 Nov 1957
- 3d Weather Group, 18 June 1958
- 4th Weather Wing, 1 June 1959
- 3d Weather Wing, 30 June 1972
- 1st Weather Wing, 1 October 1989
- Pacific Air Forces, 30 September 1991
- 343d Operations Group, 15 April – 1 June 1992
- 611th Air Operations Group, 19 February 1999 – 13 June 2008

=== Stations ===
The stations of the 11th Operational Squadron from inception to 2008:

- Ladd Field, Alaska, 11 Jan 1941
- Elmendorf Field (later Air Force Base), Alaska, 2 May 1941
- Keesler Air Force Base, Mississippi, 20 April 1952 – 18 November 1957
- Elmendorf Air Force Base, Alaska, 18 Jun 1958
- Eielson Air Force Base, Alaska, 1 April 1992 – 1 June 1992
- Elmendorf Air Force Base, Alaska, 19 February 1999 – 13 June 2008

=== Awards and campaigns ===
Award streamer	Award	Dates	Notes
	Army Meritorious Unit Commendation	1 January 1944–24 October 1945	11th Weather Squadron
	Air Force Outstanding Unit Award	1 May 1966–30 April 1968	11th Weather Squadron
	Air Force Outstanding Unit Award	1 June 1969–31 May 1971	11th Weather Squadron
	Air Force Outstanding Unit Award	1 January 1975–1 April 1976	11th Weather Squadron
	Air Force Outstanding Unit Award	1 July 1976–30 June 1978	11th Weather Squadron
	Air Force Outstanding Unit Award	1 July 1990–30 June 1992	11th Weather Squadron
	Air Force Outstanding Unit Award	1 October 1999–30 September 2001	11th Operational Weather Squadron
	Air Force Outstanding Unit Award	1 October 2003–30 September 2005	11th Operational Weather Squadron
	Air Force Outstanding Unit Award	1 November 2005–31 October 2007	11th Operational Weather Squadron
	Air Force Outstanding Unit Award	1 November 2007–13 June 2008	11th Operational Weather Squadron

Campaign Streamer	Campaign	Dates	Notes
	American Theater without inscription	7 December 1941 – 2 March 1946	11th Weather Squadron
