= 11th Fighter-Interceptor Squadron =

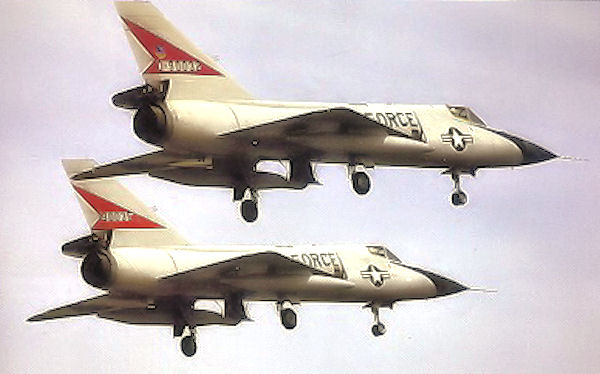
- Two squadron Convair F-106s preparing to land about 1967
- Active: 1941–1946; 1952–1968
- Country: United States
- Branch: United States Air Force
- Role: Fighter-Interceptor
- Nickname: The Aleutian Tigers (WW II)
- Mottos: Infirme Ibimus (Latin for 'We'll Go Through Hell'); We'll Be There (WW II)

Insignia
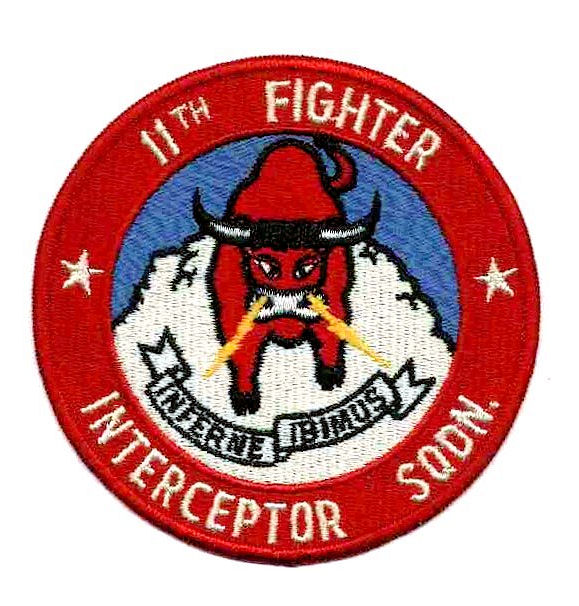
- Patch with 11th Fighter-Interceptor Squadron emblem (Note: Approved 30 November 1954. Description: On a sky blue disc, edged black, a charging red bull, highlights white, outline, horns and details black, with lightning flashes of the fourth [sic] issuing from his nostrils, over a stylized white cloud, issuing from base, outlined black.)

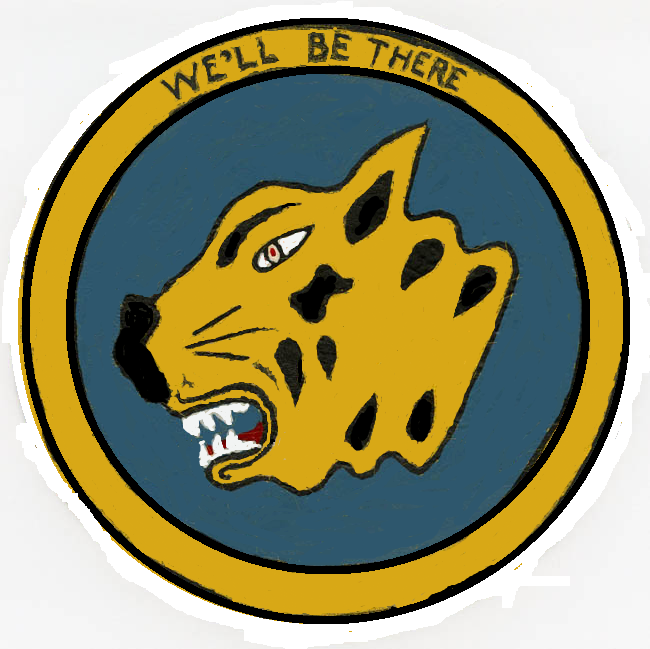
- 11th Fighter Squadron emblem (WW II)

The 11th Fighter-Interceptor Squadron is an inactive United States Air Force unit. Its last assignment was with the 343d Fighter Group at Duluth Airport, Minnesota, where it was inactivated on 30 June 1968.

== History ==
=== World War II ===
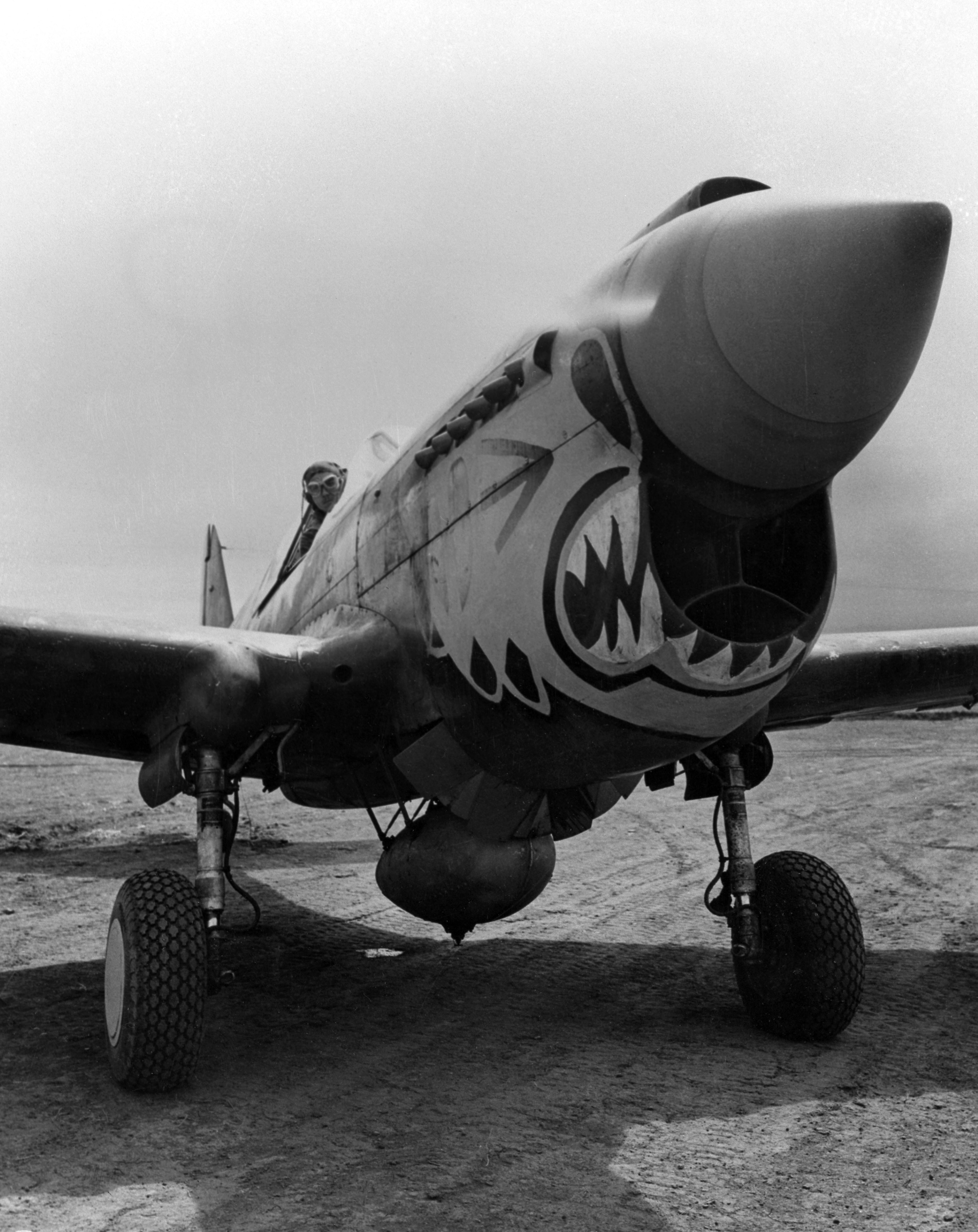
An 11th FS P-40 in Alaska, 1943

The squadron was activated as the 11th Pursuit Squadron at Selfridge Field, Michigan in January 1941 as one of the original squadrons of the 50th Pursuit Group. It trained with Vultee BT-13 Valiant and second-line Seversky P-35 Guardsman pursuit fighters at Selfridge. In September, the squadron moved to Key Field, Mississippi, where it equipped with Curtiss P-40 Warhawks.

Shortly after the Japanese attack on Pearl Harbor, the 11th was dispatched to Elmendorf Field to reinforce the defenses of Alaska against Japanese attack, departing on 19 December. The urgency of the need for reinforcements in Alaska was so great that the squadron was picked even though its pilots were untrained on the flight conditions they could expect to experience in Alaska. Two weeks elapsed before the planes reached the Sacramento Air Depot for winterization, and at the end of the month when the 11th was officially located at Elmendorf, none of its planes had left McClellan Field. Bad weather delayed necessary test flights and caused the loss of some of the squadron's Warhawks. The first plane finally left California on 1 January 1942. The lack of adequate landing fields en route, poor communications, and pilot inexperience further delayed the squadron's movement. By 25 January only 13 of the 11th's twenty-five P-40s were at Elmendorf in flyable condition and six others had been lost during the movement.

After the Japanese invasion of the Aleutians in June 1942, the squadron was engaged in combat operations 1942–1943, equipped with Warhawks and long-range Lockheed P-38 Lightnings for offensive operations against Japanese fortifications on Attu and Kiska; took part in the liberation of Attu, 1943. It remained in the Aleutian for the balance of the war, inactivating on Shemya in August 1946, when its personnel and equipment were transferred to the 64th Fighter Squadron.

=== Air Defense Command ===
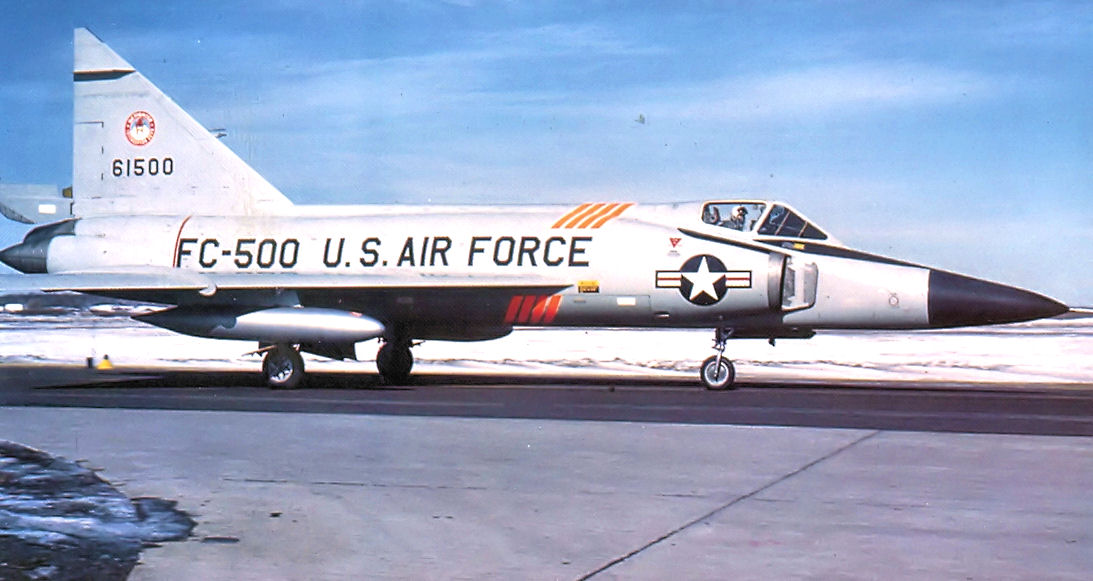
F-102 Delta Dagger 56-1500, 1958

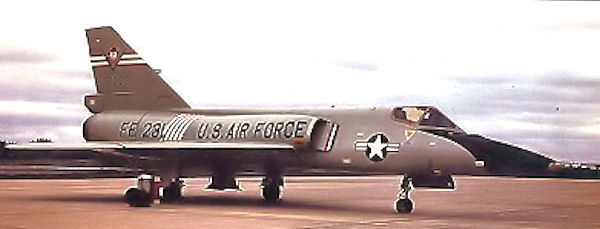
Newly received F-106, 1960

It was reactivated in December 1952 as part of Air Defense Command, replacing the federalized 179th Fighter-Interceptor Squadron of the Minnesota Air National Guard 179th FIS flying F-51D Mustangs. In the fall of 1953 the unit transitioned into jet F-89D Scorpions and later the F-102 Delta Dagger. In June 1960 the 11th FIS transitioned into F-106 Delta Darts which it flew until September 1968 when it was inactivated. On 22 October 1962, before President John F. Kennedy told Americans that missiles were in place in Cuba, the squadron dispersed one third of its force, equipped with nuclear tipped missiles to Volk Field at the start of the Cuban Missile Crisis. These planes returned to Duluth after the crisis.

Upon inactivation, the squadron's mission personnel, and F-106s were transferred to the 87th Fighter-Interceptor Squadron at Duluth IAP.

== Lineage ==
- Constituted as the 11th Pursuit Squadron (Interceptor) on 20 November 1940

Activated on 15 January 1941
Redesignated 11th Fighter Squadron on 15 May 1942
Inactivated on 15 August 1946

- Redesignated 11th Fighter-Interceptor Squadron on 10 October 1952

Activated on 1 December 1952
Inactivated on 30 June 1968

- Redesignated 11th Tactical Air Support Squadron

Activated c. 16 July 1991
Inactivated c. 20 August 1993

=== Assignments ===
- 50th Pursuit Group, 15 January 1941
- Western Theater of Operations, 30 December 1941

Attached to Provisional Interceptor Command, Alaska, 2 January 1942

- 28th Composite Group, 2 February 1942
- XI Fighter Command, 7 June 1942
- 343d Fighter Group, 11 September 1942 – 15 August 1946
- 31st Air Division, 1 December 1952
- 515th Air Defense Group, 16 February 1953
- 343d Fighter Group, 18 August 1955 – 30 June 1968
- 11th Air Control Wing, c. 16 July 1991 – c. 20 August 1993

=== Stations ===
- Selfridge Field, Michigan, 15 January 1941
- Key Field, Mississippi, 3 October – 19 December 1941
- Elmendorf Field, Alaska, 29 December 1941

Detachment at Fort Randall Army Air Field, Alaska, 25 May-c. 1 September 1942
Detachment at Fort Glenn Army Air Base, Alaska, 26 May–June 1942

- Fort Glenn Army Air Base, Alaska, June 1942
- Adak Army Air Base, Alaska, c. 20 February 1943

Detachment at: Amchitka Army Air Field, Alaska, 27 March-c. 17 May 1943, and C. 23 March 1944 – 20 July 1945

- Shemya Army Air Field, Alaska, 11 August 1945 – 15 August 1946
- Duluth International Airport, 1 December 1952 – 30 June 1968
- Eielson Air Force Base Alaska, c. 16 July 1991 – c. 20 August 1993

=== Aircraft ===
- Seversky P-35 Guardsman, 1941
- Curtiss P-36 Hawk, 1941–1942
- Curtiss P-40 Warhawk, 1941–1945
- Lockheed P-38 Lightning, 1943–1946
- North American F-51D Mustang, 1952–1953
- North American F-86D Sabre, 1953–1955
- Northrop F-89 Scorpion, 1955–1956
- Convair F-102 Delta Dagger, 1956–1960
- Convair F-106 Delta Dart, 1960–1968
- Fairchild Republic A-10 Thunderbolt II, (1991-1993)
