= 515th Air Defense Group =

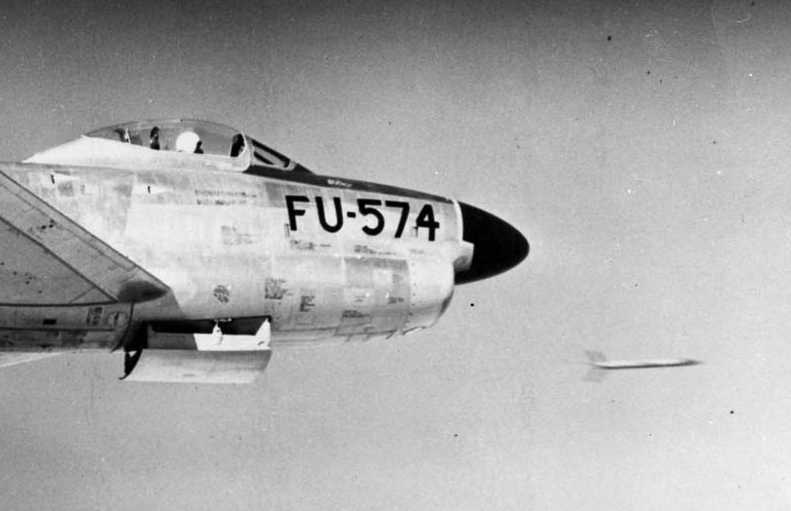
- F-86D Sabre firing Folding-Fin Aerial Rockets
- Active: 1944–1945; 1953–1955
- Country: United States
- Branch: United States Air Force
- Type: Fighter Interceptor
- Role: Air defense

The 515th Air Defense Group is a disbanded United States Air Force (USAF) organization. Its last assignment was with the 31st Air Division, stationed at Duluth Municipal Airport, Minnesota, where it was inactivated in 1955. The group was originally activated as a support unit for a combat group at the end of World War II in Italy, and then redeployed to Okinawa, where it continued that mission until it was inactivated in 1945.

The group was activated once again in 1953, when Air Defense Command (ADC) established it as the headquarters for a dispersed fighter-interceptor squadron and the medical, maintenance, and administrative squadrons supporting it. It was replaced in 1955 when ADC transferred its mission, equipment, and personnel to the 343d Fighter Group in a project that replaced air defense groups commanding fighter squadrons with fighter groups with distinguished records during World War II.

== History ==
=== World War II ===
The group was activated as the 515th Air Service Group in late 1944 as part of a reorganization of Army Air Forces (AAF) support groups in which the AAF replaced Service Groups that included personnel from other branches of the Army and supported two combat groups with Air Service Groups including only Air Corps units. The unit was designed to support a single combat group. Its 941st Air Engineering Squadron provided maintenance that was beyond the capability of the combat group, its 765th Air Materiel Squadron handled all supply matters, and its Headquarters & Base Services Squadron provided other support. It supported one combat group in Italy. In May 1945, the group assumed responsibility for supporting units that were redeploying from the Mediterranean Theater of Operations. It moved to the Pacific Theater and provided the same support on Okinawa until inactivated in 1945. The 515th was disbanded in 1948.

=== Cold War ===
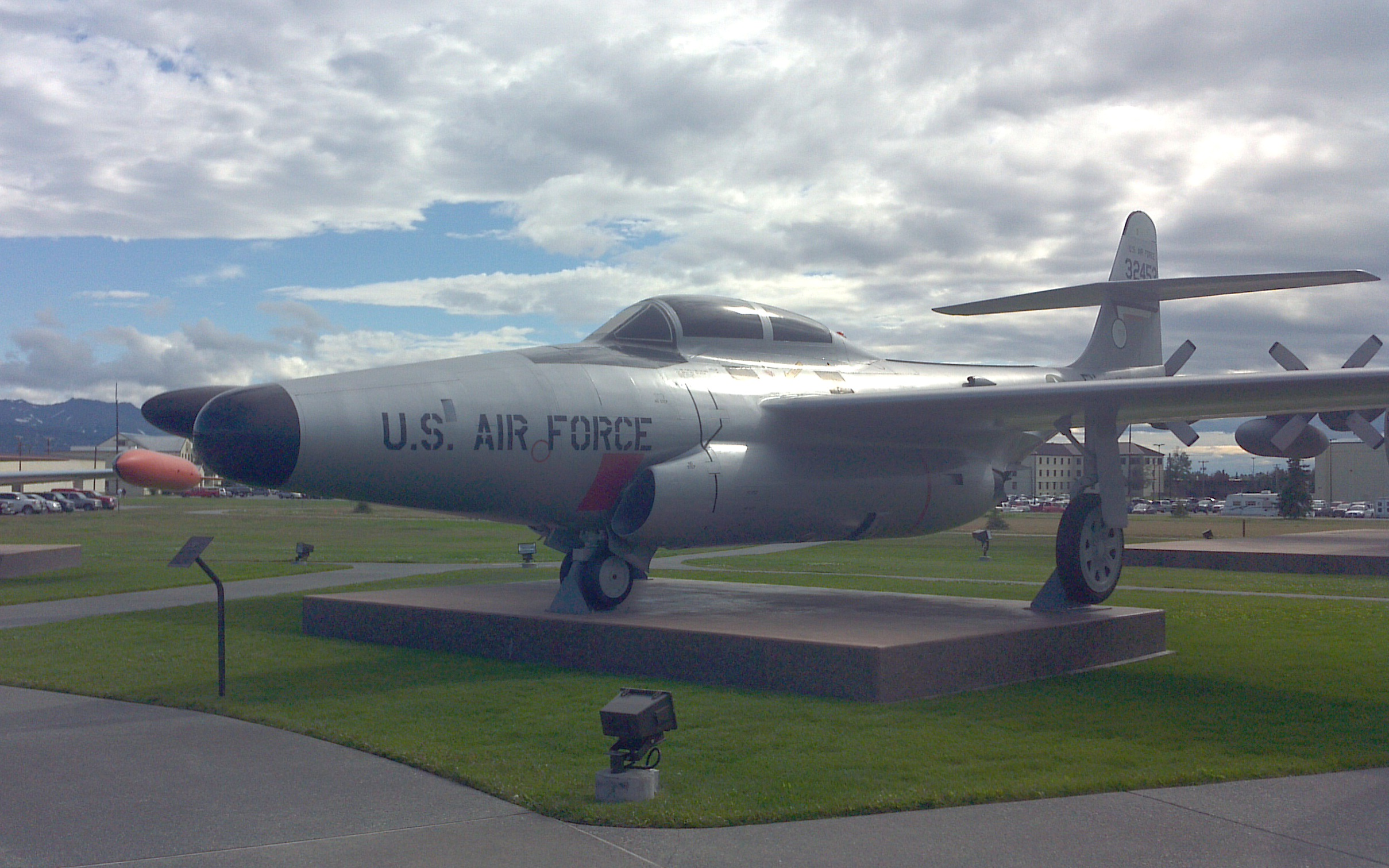
Northrop F-89 Scorpion as flown by the 515th Air Defense Group

The group was redesignated as an air defense group, reconstituted and activated at Duluth Municipal Airport in 1953 with responsibility for air defense of Great Lakes area. It was assigned the 11th Fighter-Interceptor Squadron (FIS), which was already stationed at Duluth Airport, and flying World War II era North American F-51 Mustangs as its operational component. The 11th FIS had been assigned directly to the 31st Air Division. The group replaced 73rd Air Base Squadron as the USAF host unit at Duluth Airport. It was assigned three squadrons to perform its support responsibilities.

The 11th FIS converted to Mighty Mouse rocket armed and airborne intercept radar equipped North American F-86D Sabres in the fall of 1953. The squadron began flying two-seat Northrop F-89 Scorpions in June 1955. The group was inactivated and replaced by the 343d Fighter Group (Air Defense) in 1955 as part of ADC's Project Arrow, which was designed to bring back on the active list the fighter units which had compiled memorable records in the two world wars. The 515th was disbanded once again in 1984.

== Lineage ==
- Constituted as 515th Air Service Group

Activated on 28 December 1944
Inactivated on 29 October 1945
Disbanded on 8 October 1948

- Reconstituted and redesignated 515th Air Defense Group on 21 January 1953

Activated on 16 February 1953
Inactivated on 18 August 1955
Disbanded on 27 September 1984

=== Assignments ===
- Air Service Command, Mediterranean Theater of Operations, 28 December 1944 – 1945
- Unknown, 1945 – 29 October 1945
- 31st Air Division, 16 February 1953 – 18 August 1955

=== Stations ===
- Pomigliano d'Arco Airfield, Italy 28 December 1944 – 1945
- Okinawa, 1945 – 29 October 1945
- Duluth Municipal Airport, Minnesota, 16 February 1953 – 18 August 1955

=== Components ===
Operational Squadron

- 11th Fighter-Interceptor Squadron, 16 February 1953 – 18 August 1955

Support Units

- 515th Air Base Squadron, 16 February 1953 – 18 August 1955
- 515th Materiel Squadron, 16 February 1953 – 18 August 1955
- 515th Medical Squadron (later 515th USAF Infirmary), 16 February 1953 – 18 August 1955
- 765th Air Materiel Squadron 28 December 1944 – 29 October 1945
- 941st Air Engineering Squadron 28 December 1944 – 29 October 1945

=== Aircraft ===
- North American F-51D Mustang, 1953
- North American F-86D Sabre, 1953–1955
- Northrop F-89D Scorpion, 1955

=== Commanders ===
- Lt Col. Fergus H. Eddy, 28 December 1944 – unknown
- Unknown 16 February 1953 – 18 August 1955

== See also ==
- List of United States Air Force Aerospace Defense Command Interceptor Squadrons
- List of F-86 Sabre units
- F-89 Scorpion units of the United States Air Force
