= 611th Air Operations Center =

611th Air Operations Center

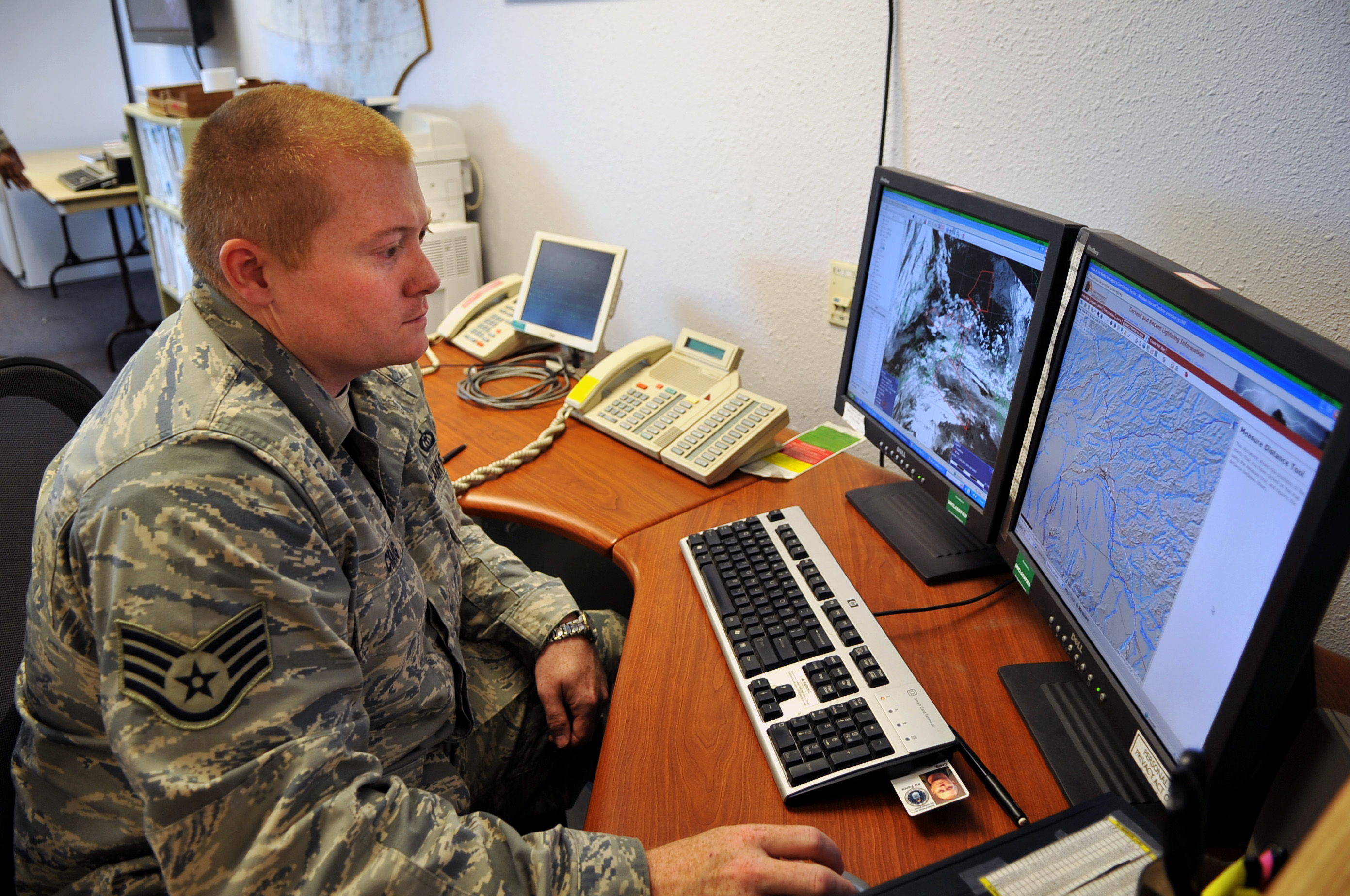
- Analyzing weather data for Exercise Northern Edge 2009
- Active: 1994–present
- Country: United States
- Branch: United States Air Force
- Role: Command and Control
- Part of: Pacific Air Forces: Eleventh Air Force
- Garrison/HQ: Joint Base Elmendorf–Richardson, Alaska

Insignia
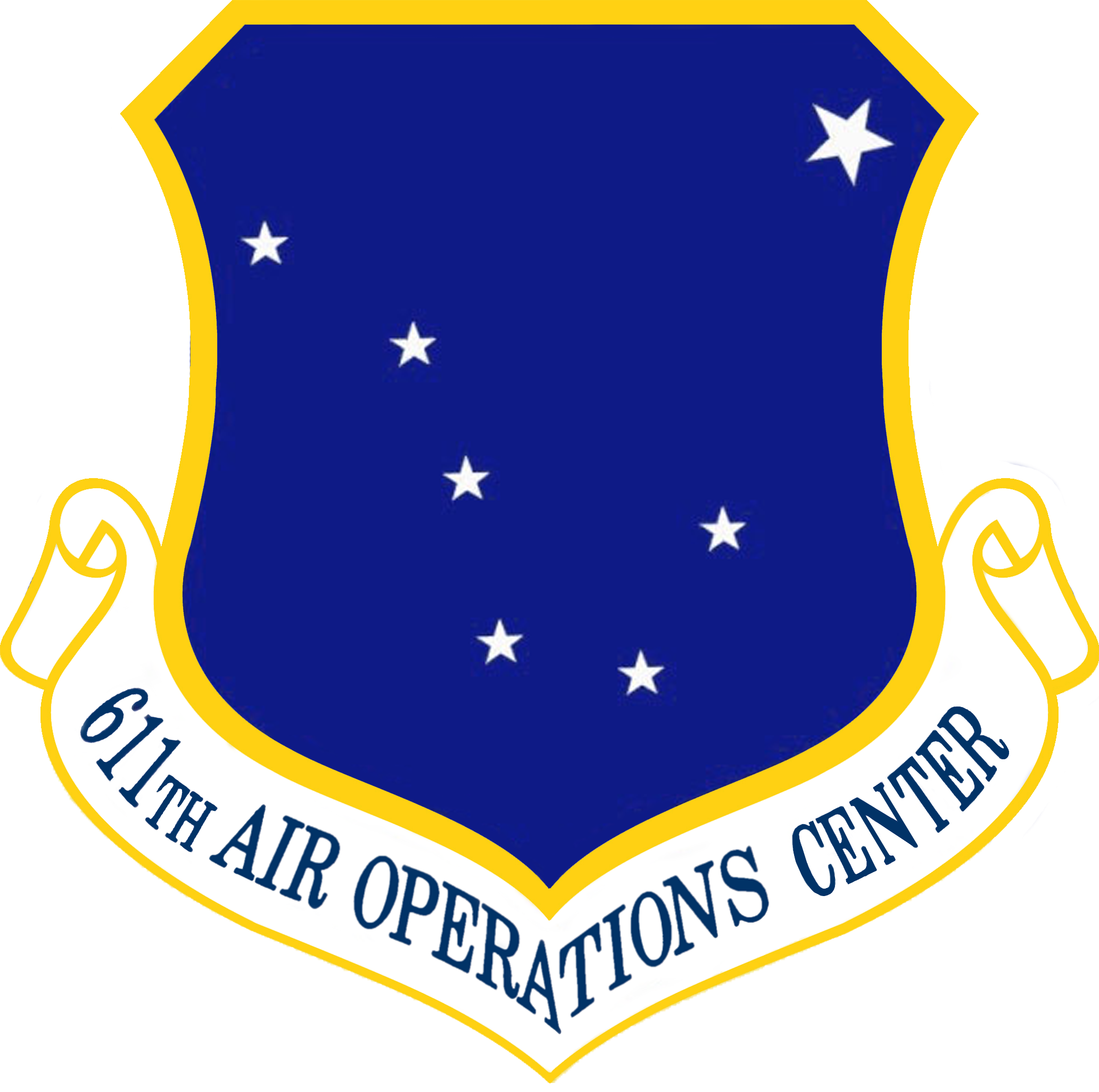
- 611th Air Operations Center emblem

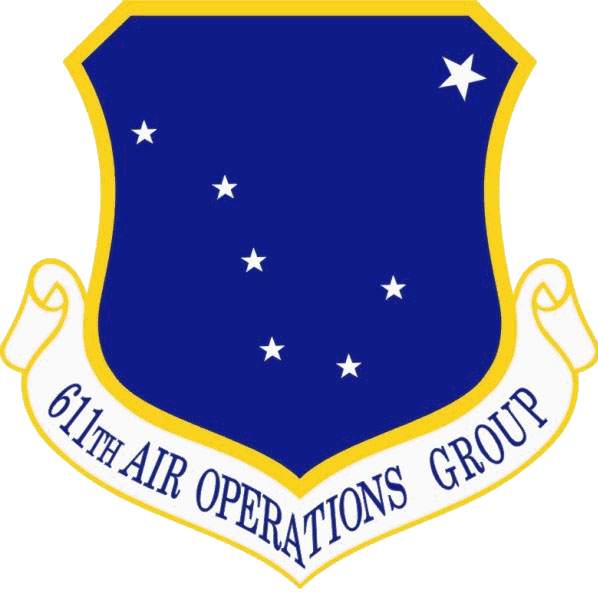
- 611th Air Operations Group emblem (Approved 13 October 1995)

The 611th Air Operations Center is an active unit of the United States Air Force's Eleventh Air Force. Based at Joint Base Elmendorf–Richardson, Alaska, it was activated in 1994.

The 611th Air Operations Group was established as a new organization on 1 July 1994. It may have included the 3rd ASOS, 611th Air Control Squadron and 611th Air Operations Squadron. Around 1997 the 611th Air Intelligence and 611th Air Communications Flights became part of the group. On 19 February 1999, the 11th Operational Weather Squadron joined the group. In 2004 the 611th Air Control Squadron was transferred to the Alaska Air National Guard and redesignated the 176th Air Control Squadron. On 1 October 2007, the group was redesignated the 611th Air Operations Center. In 2007 the 611th Air Intelligence Squadron was inactivated and the 611th Air Communications Squadron was transferred to the 611th Air Support Group, now the Pacific Regional Support Center. On 13 June 2008, the 11th Operational Weather Squadron was inactivated and merged with the 17th Operational Weather Squadron. In 2014 it was redesignated as the 611th Air Operations Center.

The 611th Air Operations Center consists of the 611th Combat Operations Division, the 611th Intelligence, Surveillance, and Reconnaissance Division, and the 611th Strategy and Plans Division. The three divisions develop plans, procedures, and directives for the employment of combat and support forces assigned to the Eleventh Air Force, the Pacific Air Forces and the North American Aerospace Defense Command. The center maintains air sovereignty and conducts air defense operations for the Alaska NORAD Region, as well as directing rescue operations and providing tactical support for air and land forces.

Prior to October 2006, the 611th planned and executed Pacific Air Forces' premier national and multinational large force training exercise, Red Flag – Alaska. This mission, and the 353d Combat Training Squadron, was returned to the 354th Fighter Wing at Eielson AFB.

== Lineage ==
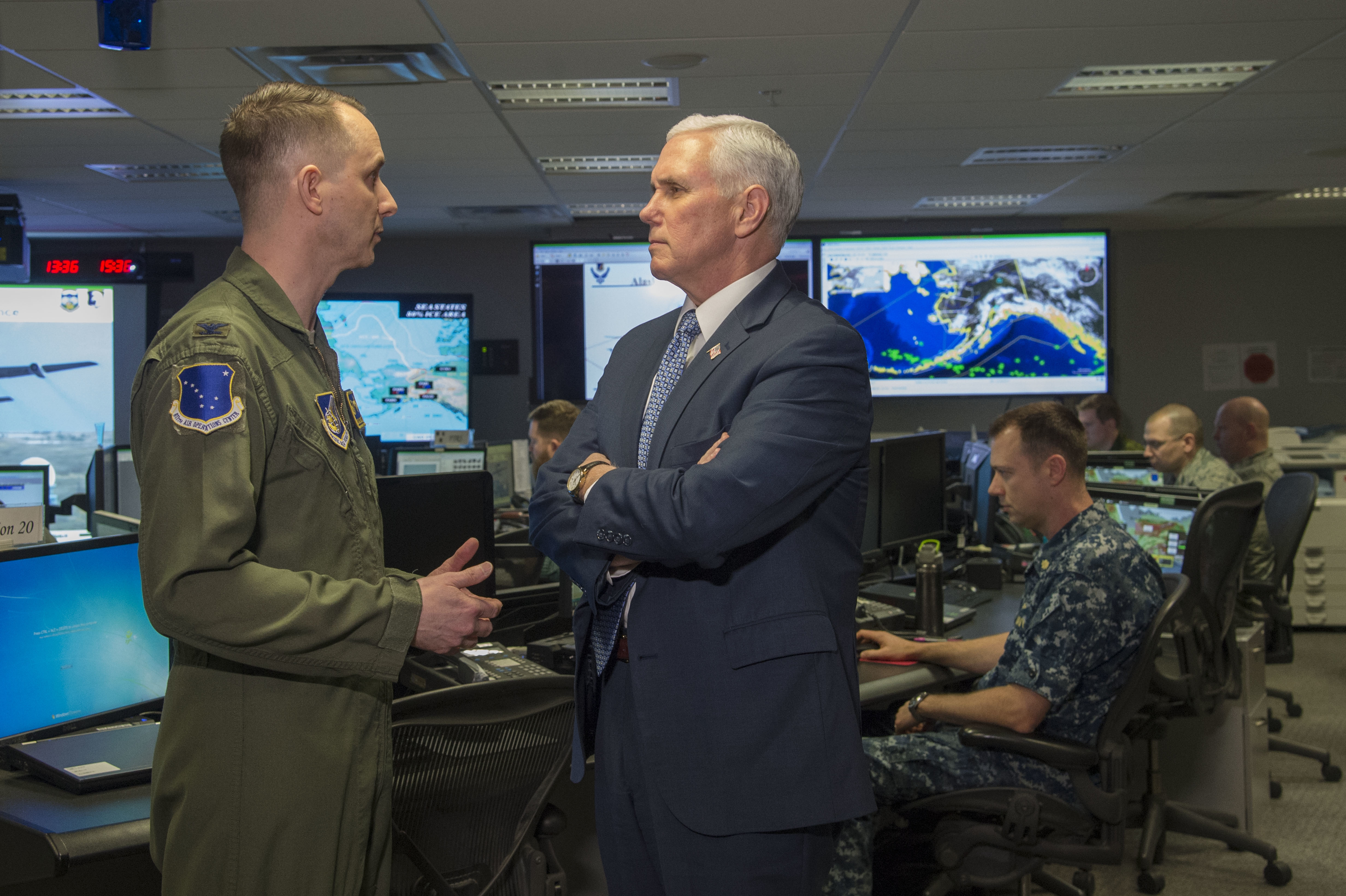
Vice President Mike Pence at the 611th AOC in 2018

- Established as 611th Air Operations Group on 1 June 1994

Activated on 1 July 1994
Redesignated 611th Air and Space Operations Center on 1 October 2007
Redesignated 611th Air Operations Center on 1 November 2014

=== Assignments ===
- Eleventh Air Force, 1 July 1994 – present

=== Components ===
- 3rd Air Support Operations Squadron, 1 July 1994 – 14 February 2003
- 11th Operational Weather Squadron, 19 February 1999 – 13 June 2008
- 611th Air Control Squadron, c. 1 July 1994 – 1 October 2004
- 611th Air Operations Squadron, c. 1 July 1994 – 1 October 2004
- 611th Air Intelligence Flight (later 611th Air Intelligence Squadron), c. 1997 – 1 October 2007
- 611th Air Communications Flight (later 611th Air Communications Squadron), c. 1997 – 1 October 2007
- 611th Alaskan NORAD Flight, unknown

=== Stations ===
- Elmendorf Air Force Base (later Joint Base Elmendorf–Richardson), Alaska, 1 July 1994 – present
