= 3rd Air Support Operations Squadron =

3rd Air Support Operations Squadron

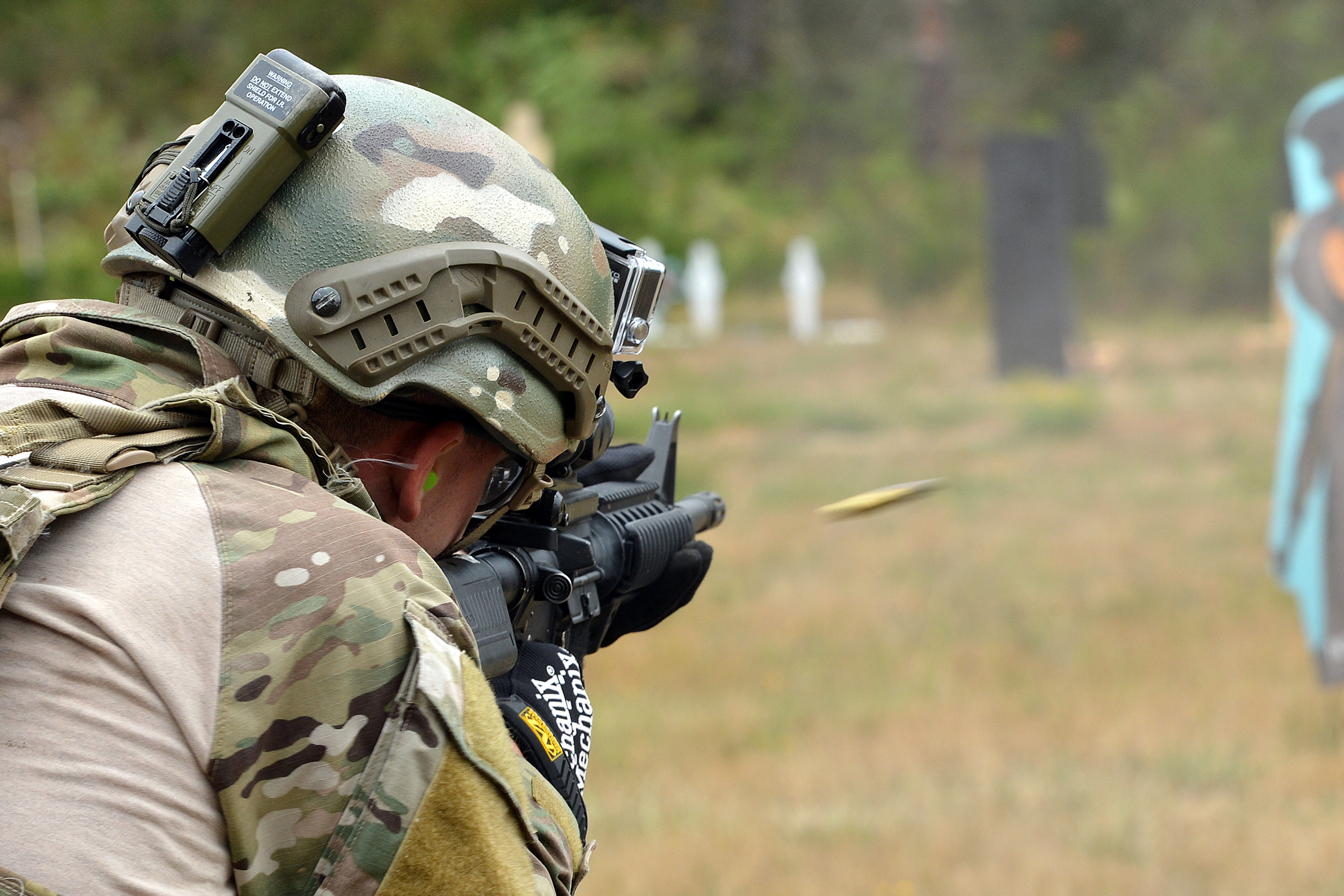
- A squadron Joint Terminal Attack Controller fires an M4 carbine during Cascade Challenge
- Active: 1964–1968; 1980–present
- Country: United States
- Branch: United States Air Force
- Role: Air Support Operations
- Part of: Pacific Air Forces
- Garrison/HQ: Fort Wainwright, Alaska
- Engagements: Iraq War
- Decorations: Air Force Outstanding Unit Award; Republic of Vietnam Gallantry Cross with Palm

Insignia
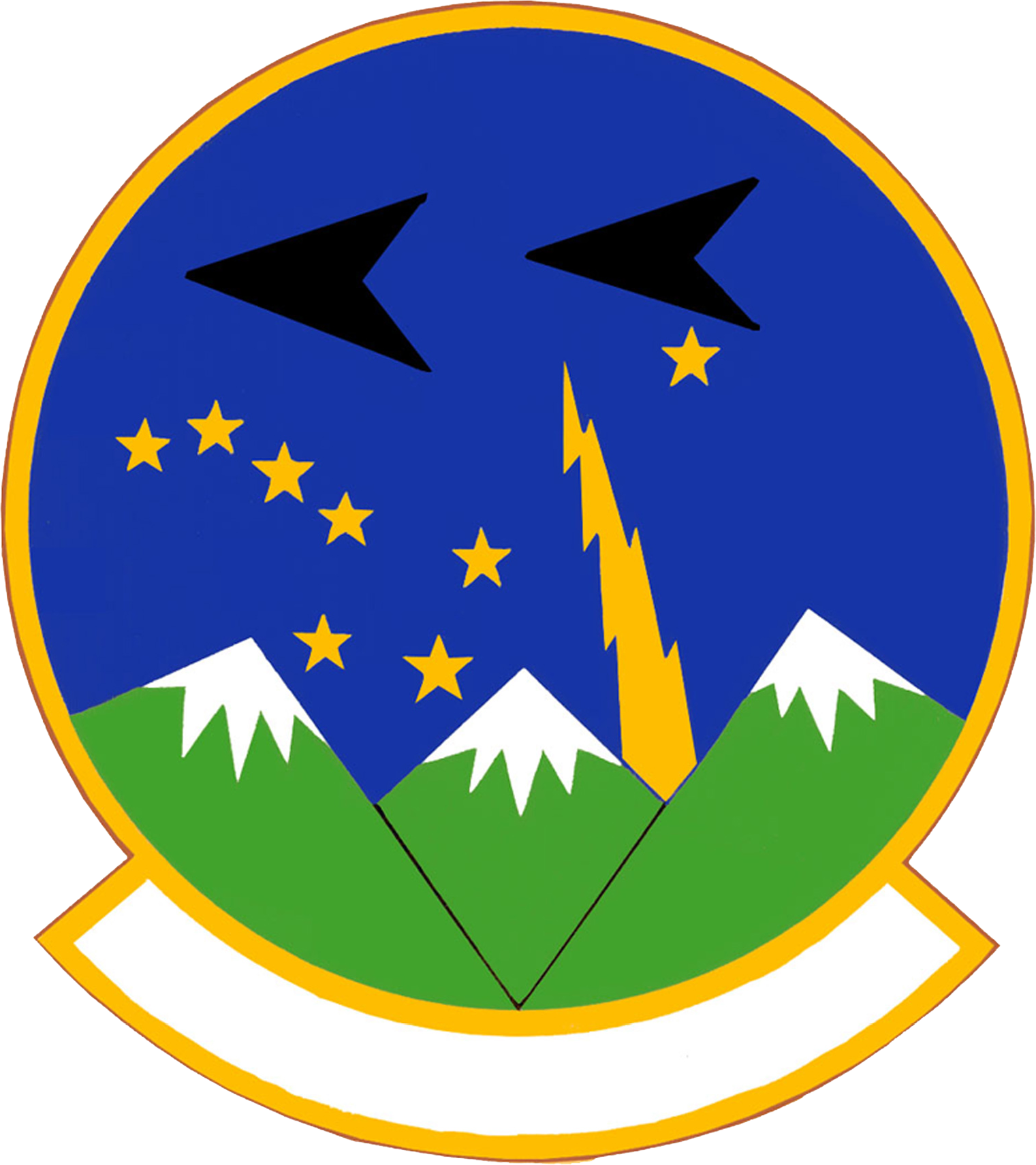
- 3rd Air Support Operations Squadron emblem (approved 28 October 1981)

The 3rd Air Support Operations Squadron is a combat support unit of the United States Air Force, located at Fort Wainwright, Alaska.

== Mission ==
The squadron trains, equips, and deploys Tactical Air Control Party (TACP) members, air liaison officers, Joint Terminal Attack Controllers, and air mobility liaison officers to support commanders of the 11th Airborne Division (previously United States Army Alaska ) and its 1st Infantry Brigade Combat Team, at Fort Wainwright, Alaska.

Detachment 1 of the squadron trains, equips, and deploys airborne-qualified TACP members, air liaison officers, joint terminal attack controllers, and air mobility liaison officers to support the commanders of the 11th Airborne Division and its 2nd Infantry Brigade Combat Team (Airborne), 11th Airborne Division, at Joint Base Elmendorf–Richardson, Alaska.

== Lineage ==
- Constituted as the 3d Direct Air Support Flight and activated on 17 September 1964 (not organized)

Organized on 8 October 1964
Inactivated on 15 September 1968

- Redesignated 3rd Air Support Operations Center Flight on 16 May 1980

Activated on 1 June 1980
Redesignated 3rd Air Support Operations Squadron on 6 January 1989

=== Assignments ===
- Pacific Air Forces, 17 September 1964 (not organized)
- 18th Tactical Fighter Wing, 8 October 1964 – 15 September 1968
- Alaskan Air Command, 1 June 1980
- 11th Tactical Control Group (later 11th Tactical Control Wing), 1 July 1981
- 343rd Operations Group, 27 January 1992
- 354th Operations Group, 20 August 1993
- 611th Air Operations Group, 1 July 1994
- 354th Operations Group, 14 February 2003
- 1st Air Support Operations Group, 1 October 2008 – present

=== Stations ===
- Kadena Air Base, Okinawa, 8 October 1964 – 15 September 1968
- Fort Richardson, Alaska, 1 June 1980
- Fort Wainwright, Alaska, 1 July 1991
- Joint Base Elmendorf-Richardson, Alaska, 13 September 2010 – present

=== Decorations ===
- Air Force Outstanding Unit Award

8 October 1964 – 5 June 1965
6 June 1965 – 31 December 1966
1 July 1982 – 30 June 1984
1 July 1985 – 30 June 1987
1 July 1990 – 30 June 1992
1 July 1994 – 30 June 1996
1 October 1999 – 30 September 2001
17 September 2003 – 16 September 2005
17 September 2005 – 20 October 2006
1 November 2008 – 13 September 2010
1 October 2012 – 30 September 2014

- Republic of Vietnam Gallantry Cross with Palm

1 April 1966 – 15 September 1968
