= 343d Wing =

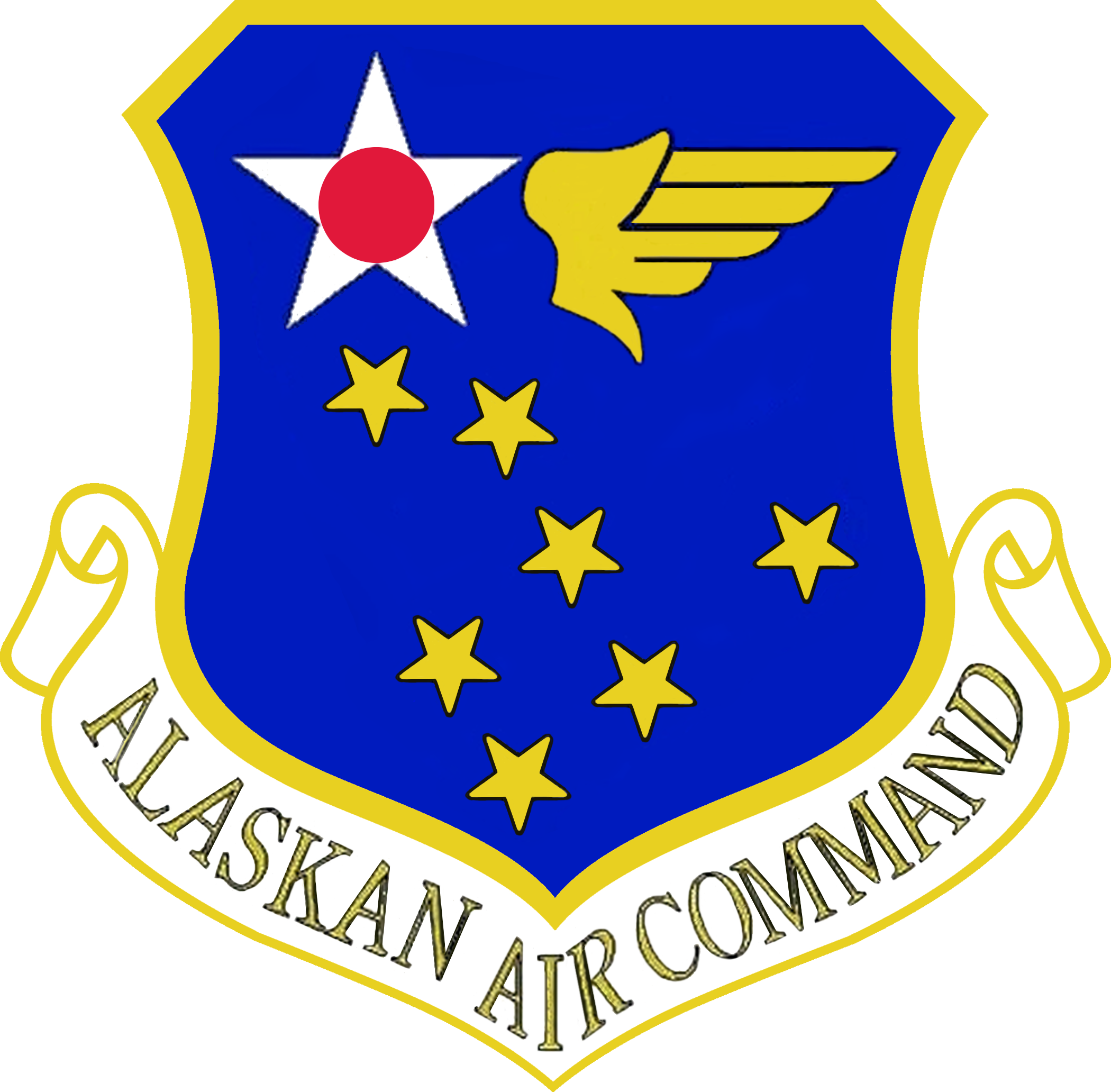
343rd Wing

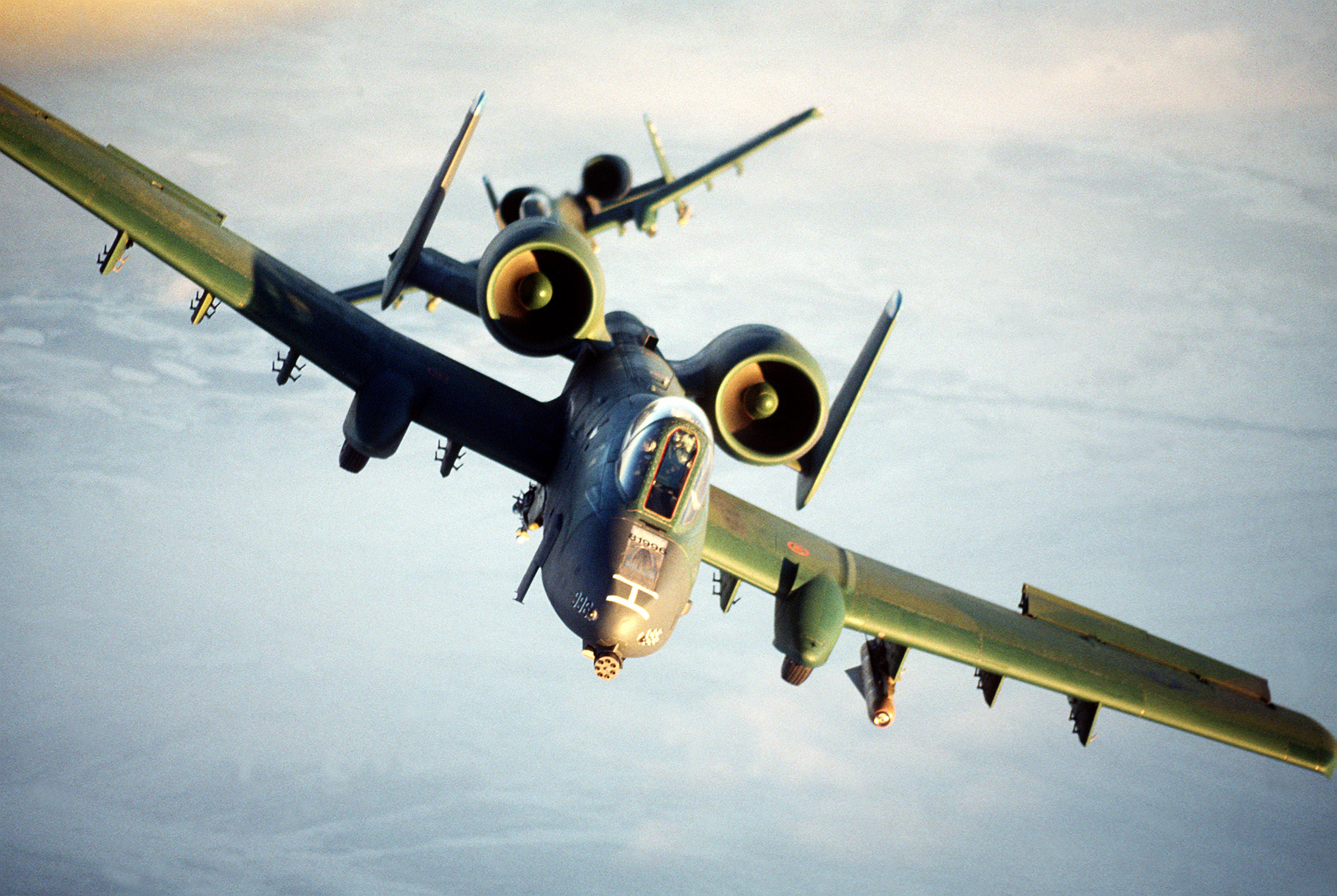
- Two of the wing's A-10A Thunderbolt IIs over Alaska during Exercise Arctic Warrior in 1991
- Active: 1942–1946, 1955–1959, 1978–1979, 1981–1993
- Country: United States
- Branch: United States Air Force
- Engagements: Aleutian Islands Campaign

Insignia
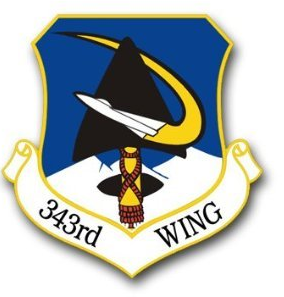
- 343d Wing emblem

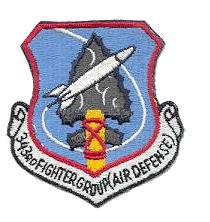
- 343d Fighter Group emblem (Approved 3 February 1956)

The 343d Wing is an inactive United States Air Force unit. Its last assignment was with Pacific Air Forces at Eielson Air Force Base, Alaska, where it was inactivated on 20 August 1993. The unit was formed at Eielson as the 343d Composite Wing and activated in October 1981 to replace the 5010th Combat Support Group. It operated both fighter and forward air control aircraft. In 1991, it also became the administrator for periodic Exercise Cope Thunder operations, which moved to Alaska from the Philippines after the eruption of Mount Pinatubo resulted in the evacuation of units from Clark Air Base When the wing was inactivated, it was replaced at Eielson by the 354th Fighter Wing.

The unit was first activated in September 1942 as the 343d Fighter Group, a headquarters for three fighter squadrons in Alaska that had been assigned to XI Fighter Command and flew a mix of Curtiss P-40 Warhawks and Lockheed P-38 Lightnings. It added a fourth squadron the following month and participated in the Aleutian Islands Campaign through the fall of 1943. After combat ceased in Alaska, the group continued to fly patrols and participate in the air defense of Alaska until the end of the war. The 343d inactivated in August 1946, when its personnel and equipment were transferred to the 57th Fighter Group.

The group was activated again at Duluth International Airport in August 1955 as part of Air Defense Command's Project Arrow, which replaced post-World War II air defense groups with fighter units from World War II. In 1957, a group pilot earned the Bendix Trophy, flying a Convair F-102 Delta Dagger. During the Cuban Missile Crisis the group dispersed its interceptor aircraft and placed all its planes on alert. The 343d continued to provide air defense of the north central United States until it was inactivated in August 1970.

In 1977, the 21st Composite Wing added the group, renamed the 343d Tactical Fighter Group, as the headquarters for its fighter squadrons at Elmendorf Air Force Base, while the wing's air defense units throughout Alaska were assigned to the 531st Aircraft Control and Warning Group. In 1981, the wing's air defense units were transferred to Alaskan Air Command and the 343d was inactivated when the 21st reorganized as a standard fighter wing.

== History ==
=== World War II ===
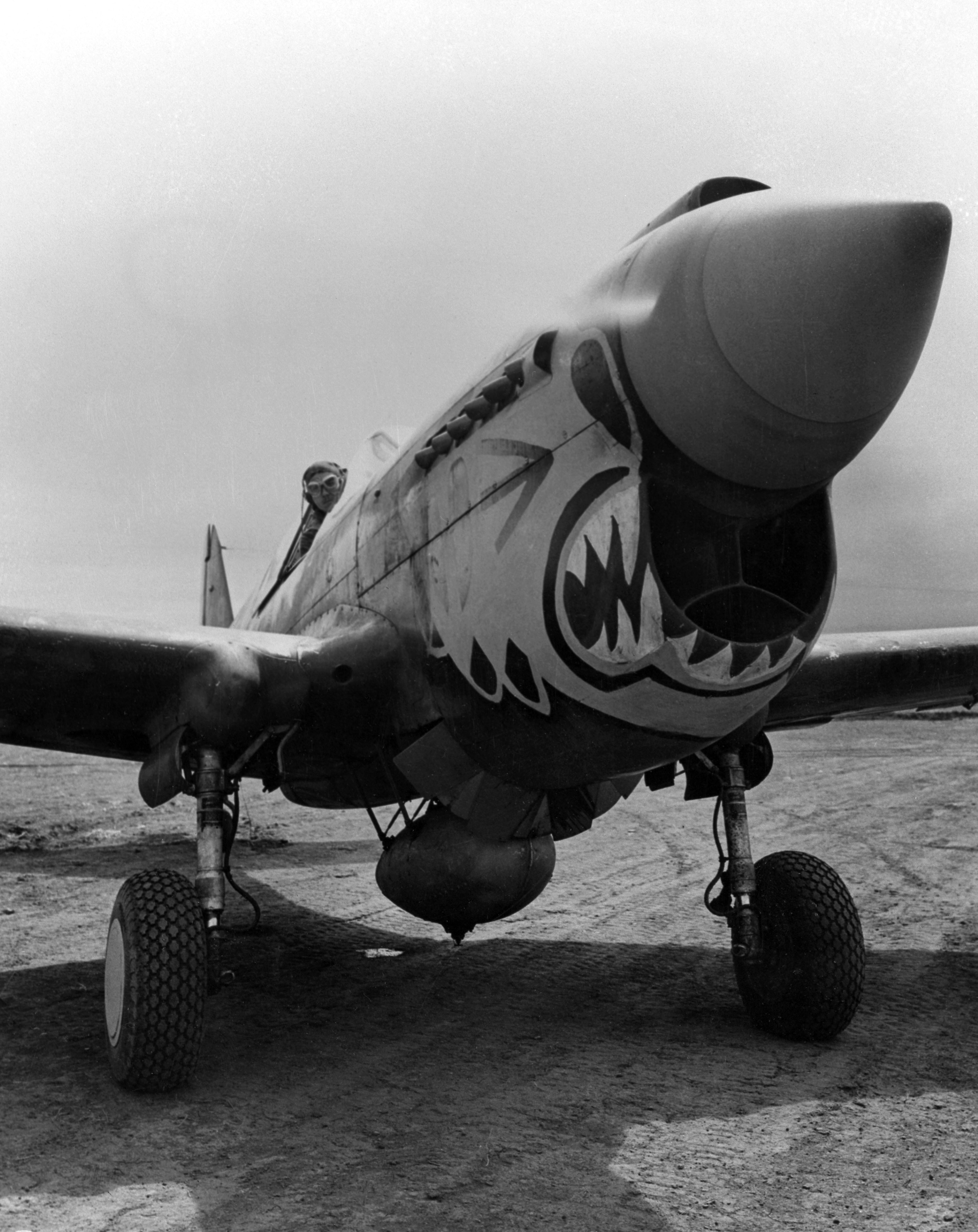
11th Fighter Squadron P-40 in Alaska, 1943

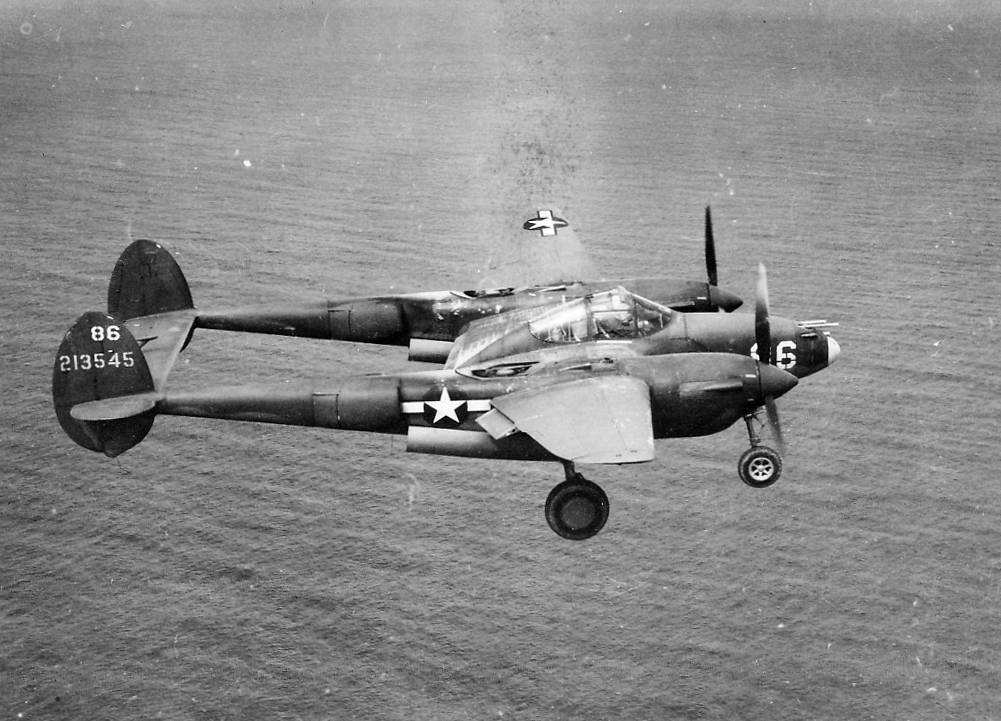
54th Fighter Squadron P-38 (Note: Aircraft is Lockheed P-38G-10-LO Lightning serial 42-13545 on approach to Amchitka AAF, taken in 1943)

The 343d Fighter Group was activated at Elmendorf Field, Alaska on 3 September 1942 and began operations immediately. Its initial squadrons, the 11th and 18th Fighter Squadrons, flying Curtiss P-40 Warhawks, were already operational at Fort Glenn Army Air Base and Big Delta Army Air Field, respectively, while the 54th Fighter Squadron and its Lockheed P-38 Lightnings were flying missions from Adak Army Air Field. All three squadrons had been assigned directly to XI Fighter Command. As soon as it was organized the 343d moved forward to Umnak Island in the Aleutians, where it joined its 11th Squadron.

In October 1942, a third P-40 squadron, the 344th Fighter Squadron, was activated at Elmendorf Field and assigned to the group. The two squadrons stationed on the mainland soon moved to the Aleutians, the 18th Squadron joined the 54th at Adak in November and the 344th deployed to Fort Randall Army Air Field in December. Although all its squadrons were operating in the Aleutians, group headquarters returned to Elmendorf in December 1942. This relocation was brief, however, and headquarters returned to the Aleutians the following March.

The group provided air defense for the Aleutian Islands. It bombed and strafed Japanese camps, antiaircraft emplacements, hangars, and radio stations on Kiska. The group escorted bombers that struck enemy airfields, harbor facilities, and shipping. It flew its last combat mission in October 1943, but carried out patrol and reconnaissance missions in the area until the end of the war.

The 343d later trained, carried mail, and served as part of the defense force for Alaska. In 1943, the 11th and 18th Fighter Squadrons began flying P-38s in addition to their P-40s, as did the 344th in 1944. It was not until 1945 that all four squadrons lost their last P-40s and the group became an all-Lightning unit. In 1945, the group and three of its squadrons were united at Shemya Army Air Base, at the end of the Aleutian chain. Early in 1945 the 54th Squadron began to fly special high-altitude missions designed to intercept Japanese fire balloons drifting toward the United States on the jet stream. These weapons were launched from the Japanese home islands into the upper atmosphere to carry incendiary charges which would be released onto the United States and Canada. The balloons' flight path crossed the Aleutians, where American planes had the first chance to shoot them down. The airfield at Alexai Point was directly in the flight path of the balloons, which passed overhead at between 30,000 to 37,000 feet (9,100–11,000 m).

The 18th Fighter Squadron returned to the Alaskan mainland, where it converted to North American P-51 Mustangs in 1946. The group's 54th Squadron returned to the United States in March 1946 for inactivation, while the group and its remaining squadrons were inactivated later that year, in August. The group's mission, personnel and equipment were transferred to the 57th Fighter Group, which was simultaneously activated at Shemya.

343d Ftr Gp

Aerial Victories	Number	Note
Group Hq	1
11th Fighter Squadron	8	(Note: Six of these victories were scored before the 11th Squadron was assigned to the group. Newton & Senning, p. 533.)
18th Fighter Squadron	2
54th Fighter Squadron	12	(Note: Two of these victories were scored before the 54th Squadron was assigned to the group. Newton & Senning, p. 536.)
344th Fighter Squadron	0
Group Total	15	(Note: Total excludes 8 victories by the 11th and 54th Squadrons credited before they were assigned to the group.)

=== Air Defense Command ===
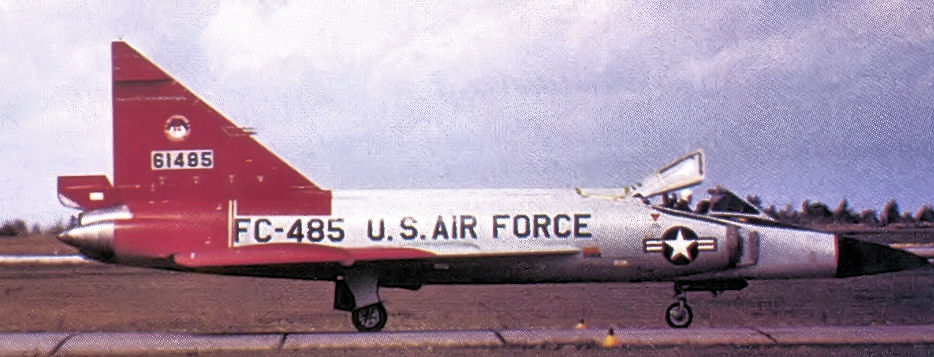
11th Fighter-Interceptor Squadron F-102 (Note: Aircraft is Convair F-102A-80-CO Delta Dagger serial 56-1485. Taken at Duluth Airport in 1959.)

The group was redesignated the 343d Fighter Group (Air Defense) and activated at Duluth International Airport in August 1955, replacing the 515th Air Defense Group and assuming the 515th's personnel and equipment as part of Air Defense Command (ADC)'s Project Arrow, which was designed to bring back on the active list the fighter units which had compiled memorable records in the two world wars. The 11th Fighter-Interceptor Squadron, flying Northrop F-89 Scorpions, was reassigned from the 515th as the group's operational squadron. The group was also the host organization for active United States Air Force units at Duluth and was assigned several support organizations to fulfill this mission.

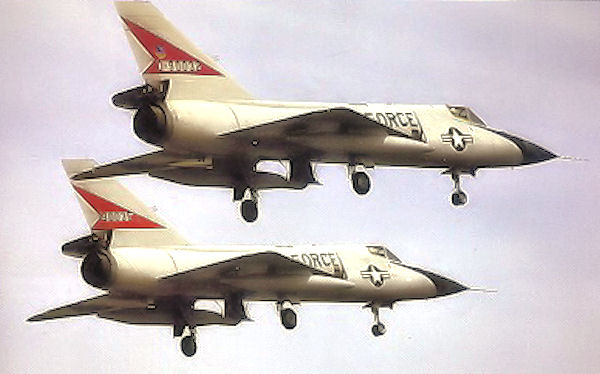
Two 11th FIS F-106s preparing to land at Duluth Airport, about 1967

In June 1956, the 11th Squadron upgraded from Scorpions to Convair F-102 Delta Daggers. Flying its new "Deuces" in 1957, group aircraft placed first and second in the Bendix Trophy competition. In July 1960 the group converted to the Convair F-106 Delta Dart. Prior to February 1962, ADC required two aircraft of each of its squadrons to be on five-minute alert. This requirement was expanded and in addition one third of the groups's interceptor aircraft were placed on fifteen-minute alert.

On 22 October 1962, at the beginning of the Cuban Missile Crisis, when President Kennedy announced the presence of Soviet intermediate-range ballistic missiles in Cuba, Continental Air Defense Command (CONAD) directed the dispersal of interceptors within the United States. Although the group's planned dispersal base was RCAF Portage la Prairie, Manitoba, dispersed aircraft were not sent to Canadian airfields. Instead, the group sent one third of its aircraft to Volk Field, Wisconsin. All group aircraft, including those at home and those at Volk Field were armed and placed on fifteen-minute alert status. The increased alert posture was maintained through mid-November, when CONAD returned units to their normal alert status, except for those under the control of its 32d Region, which controlled air defense in the Southeastern United States.

The 11th Squadron was discontinued in the fall of 1968 and replaced by the 87th Fighter-Interceptor Squadron, which was activated and took over the 11th's personnel and Delta Darts. The group performed the air defense mission for the upper Great Lakes region of the north central United States until 1970, when it was inactivated. The 87th Squadron was reassigned directly to the 23d Air Division and the group's support functions, personnel, and equipment at Duluth were transferred to the newly organized 4787th Air Base Group.

=== Return to Alaska ===
==== Group at Elmendorf ====
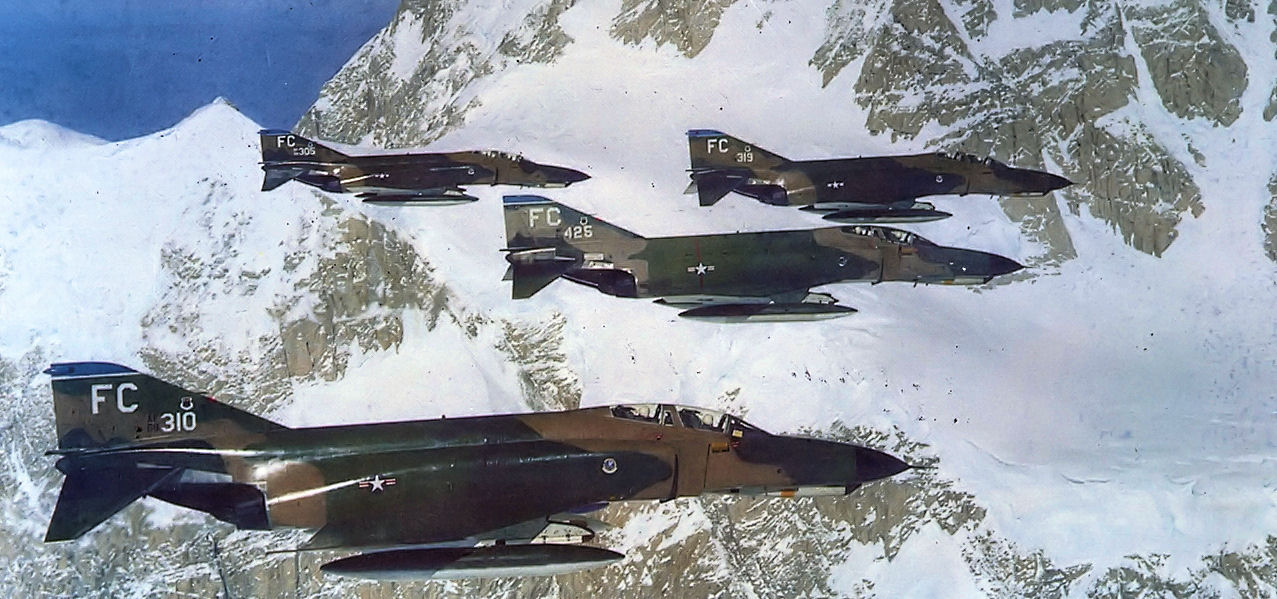
43d Tactical Fighter Squadron F-4Es at Mount McKinley

The group was redesignated as the 343d Tactical Fighter Group and activated at Elmendorf Air Force Base, Alaska in November 1977 to serve as the headquarters for the two fighter squadrons of the 21st Composite Wing. These were the 43d Tactical Fighter Squadron, which had been flying McDonnell F-4 Phantom IIs at Elmendorf since 1970 and the recently activated 18th Tactical Fighter Squadron, also flying the F-4E. The 21st Tactical Fighter Wing's other operational group was the 531st Aircraft Control and Warning Group, which controlled air defense units and stations throughout Alaska. The following year aircraft maintenance was transferred from the wing and three maintenance squadrons were added to the group's strength. The group was inactivated in January 1980. Its operational squadrons were reassigned directly to the 21st Wing, which converted from a composite wing to a standard fighter wing and became the 21st Tactical Fighter Wing. The personnel and equipment of the group's maintenance squadrons were transferred to squadrons assigned directly to the wing.

==== Wing at Eielson ====
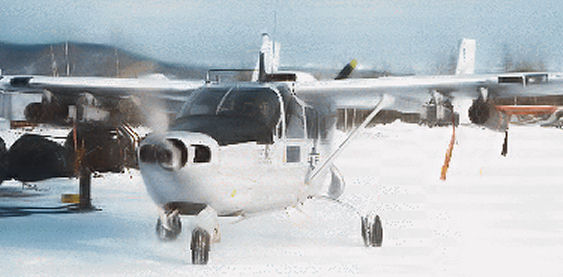
25th TASS O-2A at Eielson AFB

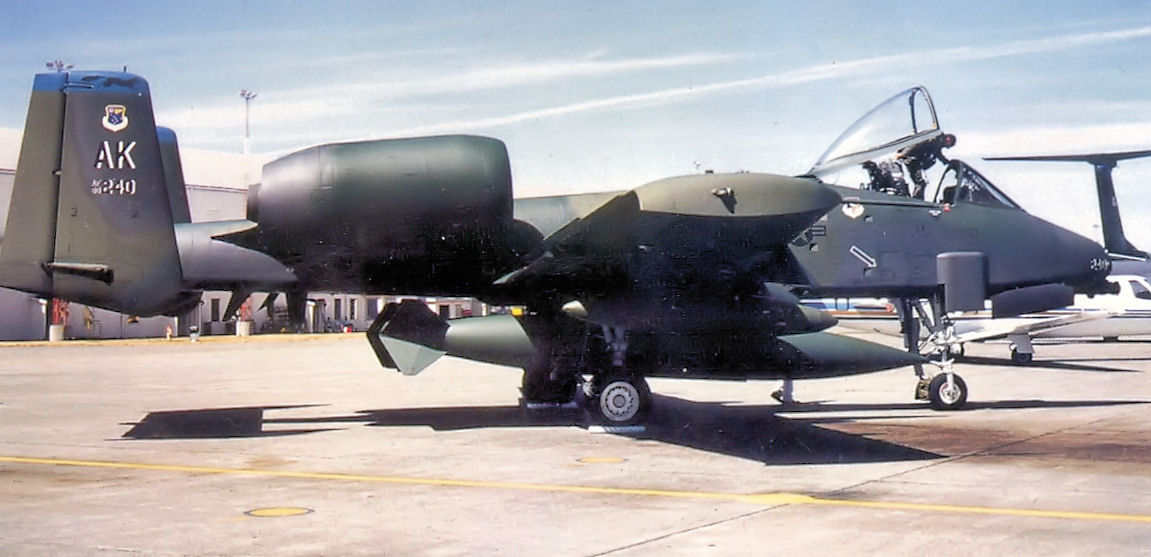
18th Tactical Fighter Squadron A-10 at Eielson

The 343d became Eielson Air Force Base's host unit on 1 October 1981 as the 343d Composite Wing, when it replaced the 5010th Combat Support Group and absorbed the 5010th's personnel and equipment. The 25th Air Support Operations Squadron, flying the Cessna O-2 Skymaster, was transferred from the 5010th as the wing's initial operational squadron. In January 1982, the wing received its second operational squadron when the 18th Tactical Fighter Squadron moved from Elmendorf to Eielson with its Thunderbolt IIs and was again assigned to the 343d. That fall, the wing's maintenance organization was converted to the Production Oriented Maintenance Organization, and three new maintenance squadrons were activated to replace the existing single maintenance squadron. As Eielson's host organization, one of the wing's major collateral missions was to provide support to Strategic Air Command's 6th Strategic Wing, which conducted aerial refueling and reconnaissance missions from the base until becoming non-operational in June 1992.

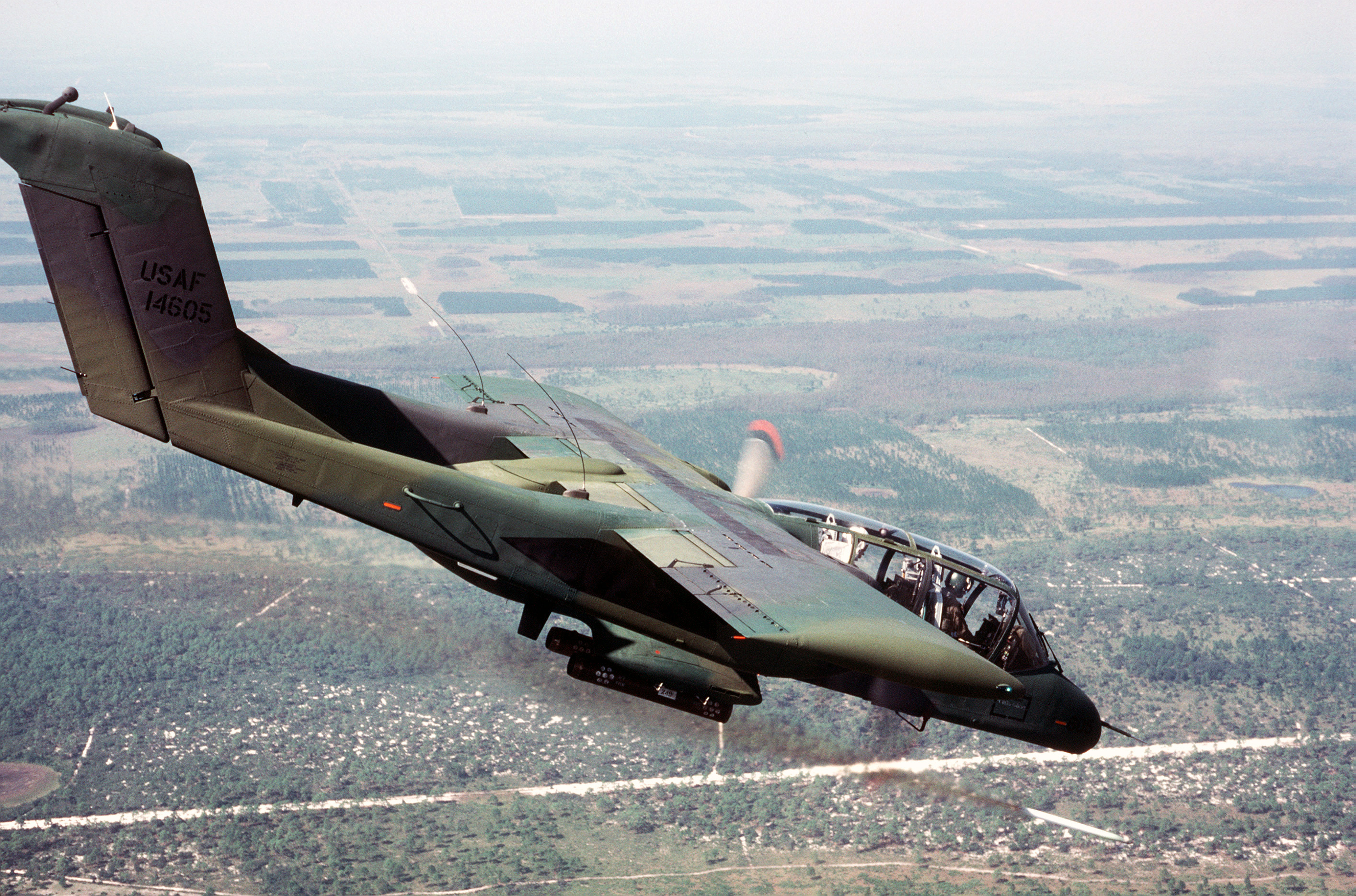
OV-10 Bronco firing White phosphorus

On 8 June 1984, the 343d Composite Wing was redesignated the 343d Tactical Fighter Wing. In July 1986, the 25th's O-2s were retired and replaced by North American Rockwell OV-10A Broncos. A little more than three years later, on 15 September 1989, the squadron inactivated.

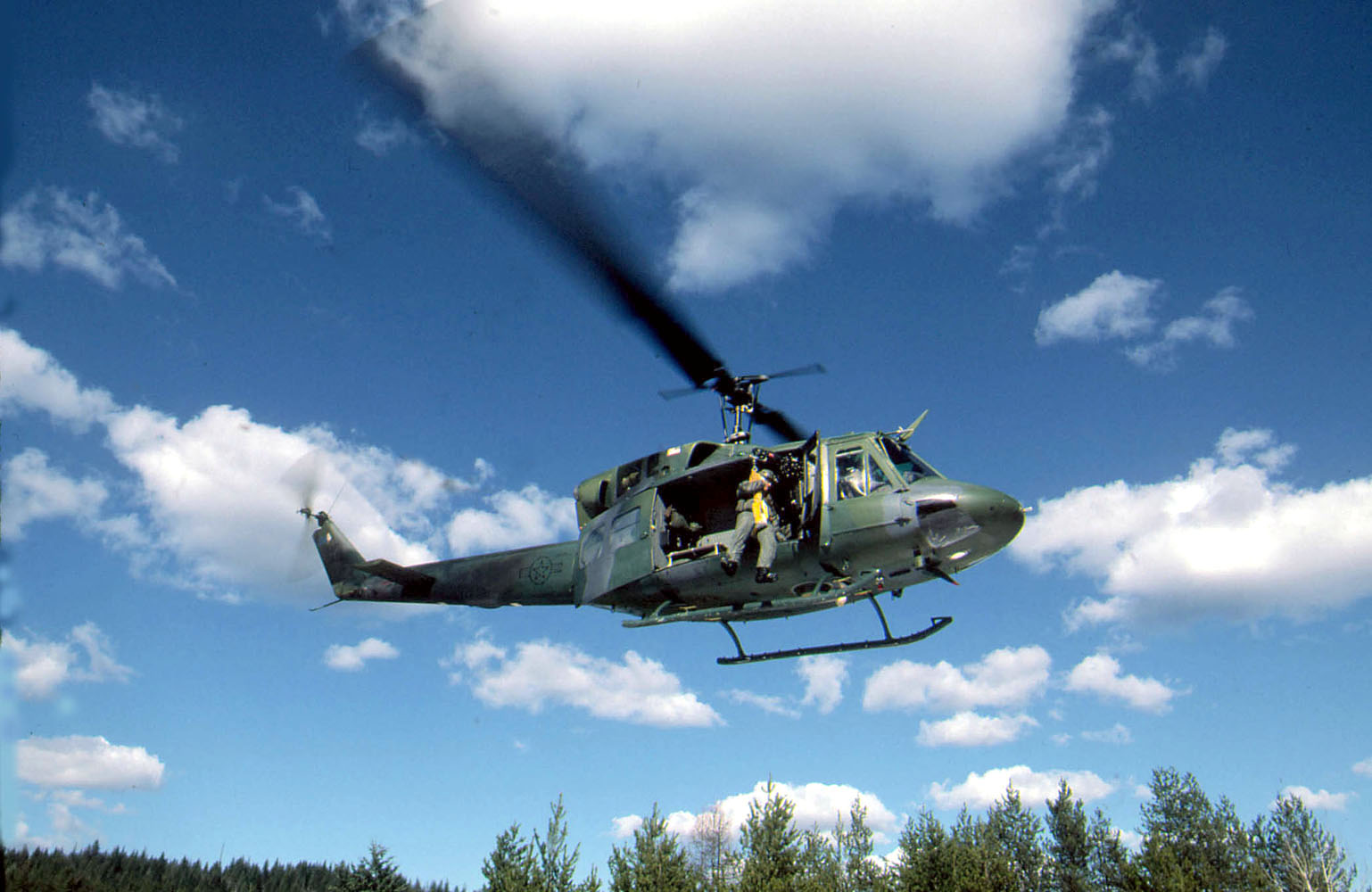
UH-1N as flown by the 3d Fighter Training Squadron

On 1 July 1991, the wing was redesignated as the 343d Wing and converted to the USAF Objective Wing organization. The 18th Tactical Fighter Squadron was assigned to the newly activated 343d Operations Group, while the maintenance squadrons that had been assigned directly to the wing became part of the 343d Logistics Group. Also that year, the 343d gained a second flying unit, the 3d Fighter Training Squadron, which moved from Clark Air Base following the eruption of Mount Pinatubo, which forced the closure of Clark. Despite the "Fighter" in its name, the 3d flew Bell UH-1N Twin Hueys. The squadron was responsible for range support and administration of Exercise Cope Thunder, which had also moved from Clark, its home since 1976, to Alaska. The Alaskan Air Combat Maneuvering Instrumentation Range achieved Initial Operational Capability at the Stony Military Operating Area, which permitted the move. During 1991, the 18th Squadron handed off its Thunderbolts to the 11th Tactical Air Support Squadron of the 11th Air Control Wing (Note: The 11th Tactical Air Support Squadron was the 343d's former 11th Fighter Squadron, while the 11th Air Control Wing was its former fellow group in the 21st Composite Wing, the 531st Aircraft Control and Warning Group.) and transitioned to Block 40 General Dynamics F-16 Fighting Falcons.

On 20 August 1993, the wing inactivated and its personnel and equipment were transferred to the 354th Fighter Wing, which moved to Eielson without personnel or equipment from Myrtle Beach Air Force Base, South Carolina.

== Lineage ==
- Constituted as the 343d Fighter Group on 3 September 1942

Activated on 3 September 1942
Inactivated on 15 August 1946

- Redesignated as 343d Fighter Group (Air Defense) on 20 June 1955

Activated on 18 August 1955
Inactivated on 28 August 1970

- Redesignated 343d Tactical Fighter Group

Activated on 15 November 1977
Inactivated on 1 January 1980

- Redesignated 343d Composite Wing

Activated on 1 October 1981
Redesignated 343d Tactical Fighter Wing on 8 June 1984
Redesignated 343d Wing on 1 July 1991
Inactivated on 20 August 1993

=== Assignments ===
- XI Fighter Command, 3 September 1942
- Eleventh Air Force, 31 March 1944 – 15 August 1946
- 31st Air Division, 18 August 1955
- 37th Air Division, 1 January 1959
- 30th Air Division, 1 April 1959
- Duluth Air Defense Sector, 15 November 1959
- 29th Air Division, 1 April 1966
- 34th Air Division, 15 September 1969
- 29th Air Division, 14 November 1969
- 23d Air Division, 19 November 1969 – 28 August 1970
- 21st Composite Wing (later 21st Tactical Fighter Wing), 15 November 1977 – 1 January 1980
- Alaskan Air Command (later Eleventh Air Force), 1 October 1981 – 20 August 1993

=== Stations ===
- Elmendorf Field, Alaska, 11 September 1942
- Fort Glenn Army Air Base, Alaska, September 1942
- Elmendorf Field, Alaska, 3 December 1942
- Adak Army Airfield, Alaska, 7 March 1943
- Amchitka Army Airfield, Alaska, 25 July 1943
- Alexai Point Army Air Field, Alaska, 22 January 1944
- Shemya Army Air Base, Alaska, 5 October 1945 – 15 August 1946
- Duluth International Airport, Minnesota, 18 August 1955 – 28 August 1970
- Elmendorf Air Force Base, Alaska, 15 November 1977 – 1 January 1980
- Eielson Air Force Base, Alaska, 1 October 1981 – 20 August 1993

=== Components ===
==== Operational Units ====
Group

- 343d Operations Group, 1 July 1991 – 20 August 1993

Squadrons

- 11th Fighter Squadron (later 11th Fighter-Interceptor Squadron, 11th Tactical Air Support Squadron): 11 September 1942 – 15 August 1946, 18 August 1955 – 30 September 1968,
- 18th Fighter Squadron (later 18th Tactical Fighter Squadron): 11 September 1942 – 15 August 1946, 15 November 1977 – 1 January 1980, 1 January 1982 – 1 July 1991
- 25th Tactical Air Support Squadron: 1 October 1981 – 15 September 1989
- 43d Tactical Fighter Squadron: 15 November 1977 – 1 January 1980
- 54th Fighter Squadron: 11 September 1942 – 21 March 1946
- 87th Fighter-Interceptor Squadron: 30 September 1968 – 28 August 1970
- 344th Fighter Squadron: 10 October 1942 – 15 August 1946

==== Support Units ====
Groups

- 343d Combat Support Group (later 343d Support Group): 1 October 1981 – 20 August 1993
- 343d Logistics Group: 1 July 1991 – 20 August 1993
- 343d Medical Group (see USAF Clinic, Eielson)

Squadrons

- 11th Fighter Control Squadron: c. February 1943 – 1 October 1943
- 343d Comptroller Squadron, 1 September 1987 – 1 October 1991
- 343d Air Base Squadron (later 343d Combat Support Squadron): 18 August 1955 – 28 August 1970
- 343d Aircraft Generation Squadron: 1 April 1978 – 1 January 1980, 1 October 1982 – 1 July 1991
- 343d Component Repair Squadron: 1 April 1978 – 1 January 1980, 1 October 1982 – 1 July 1991
- 343d Consolidated Aircraft Maintenance Squadron: 8 September 1957 – 28 August 1970, 1 October 1981 – 1 October 1982
- 343d Equipment Maintenance Squadron: 1 April 1978 – 1 January 1980, 1 October 1982 – 1 July 1991
- 343d Materiel Squadron: 18 August 1955 – 1 April 1964
- 343d Supply Squadron: 1 April 1964 – 28 August 1970, 1 October 1981 – 1 July 1991
- 1995th Communications Squadron (later 343d Communications Squadron): c. 1 July 1991 – 20 August 1993
- 1 Photographic Flight: 5 May 1943 – c. November 1943

Other

- 343d USAF Infirmary (later 343d USAF Dispensary): 18 August 1955 – 28 August 1970
- USAF Clinic, Eielson (later 343d Medical Group): 1 October 1981 – 20 August 1993

=== Aircraft ===
- Lockheed P-38 Lightning, 1942–1946
- Lockheed F-5 Lightining, 1943
- Bell P-39 Airacobra, 1943
- Curtiss P-40 Warhawk, 1942–1946
- North American P-51 Mustang, 1946
- Northrop F-89D Scorpion, 1955–1956
- Convair F-102A Delta Dagger, 1956–1960
- Convair F-106A Delta Dart, 1960–1970
- Fairchild Republic A-10 Thunderbolt II, 1977–1980, 1981–1991
- McDonnell F-4 Phantom II, 1977–1980
- Cessna O-2A Skymaster, 1981–1986
- North American Rockwell OV-10A Bronco, 1986–1989
- Bell UH-1N Twin Huey, 1991–1993
- General Dynamics F-16C/D Fighting Falcon, 1991–1993

=== Awards and campaigns ===
Award streamer	Award	Dates	Notes
	Air Force Outstanding Unit Award	1 January 1978 – 31 December 1978	343d Tactical Fighter Group
	Air Force Outstanding Unit Award	1 January 1983 – 30 June 1984	343d Composite Wing (later 343d Tactical Fighter Wing)
	Air Force Outstanding Unit Award	1 July 1985 – 30 June 1987	343d Tactical Fighter Wing
	Air Force Outstanding Unit Award	1 January 1988 – 31 December 1989	343d Tactical Fighter Wing
	Air Force Outstanding Unit Award	1 July 1990 – 30 June 1992	343d Tactical Fighter Wing (later 343d Wing)

- Bendix Trophy 1957 (First and second places)

Campaign Streamer	Campaign	Dates	Notes
	Aleutian Islands	11 September 1942 – 24 August 1943	343d Fighter Group

== See also ==
- F-89 Scorpion units of the United States Air Force
- General Dynamics F-16 Fighting Falcon operators
- List of F-106 Delta Dart units of the United States Air Force
- List of inactive AFCON wings of the United States Air Force
- List of Lockheed P-38 Lightning operators
- List of United States Air Force Aerospace Defense Command Interceptor Squadrons
