= 11th Air Control Wing =

11th Air Control Wing
- Active: 1948–1950; 1950–1953; 1977–1994
- Country: United States
- Branch: United States Air Force
- Part of: Pacific Air Forces: Eleventh Air Force

Insignia
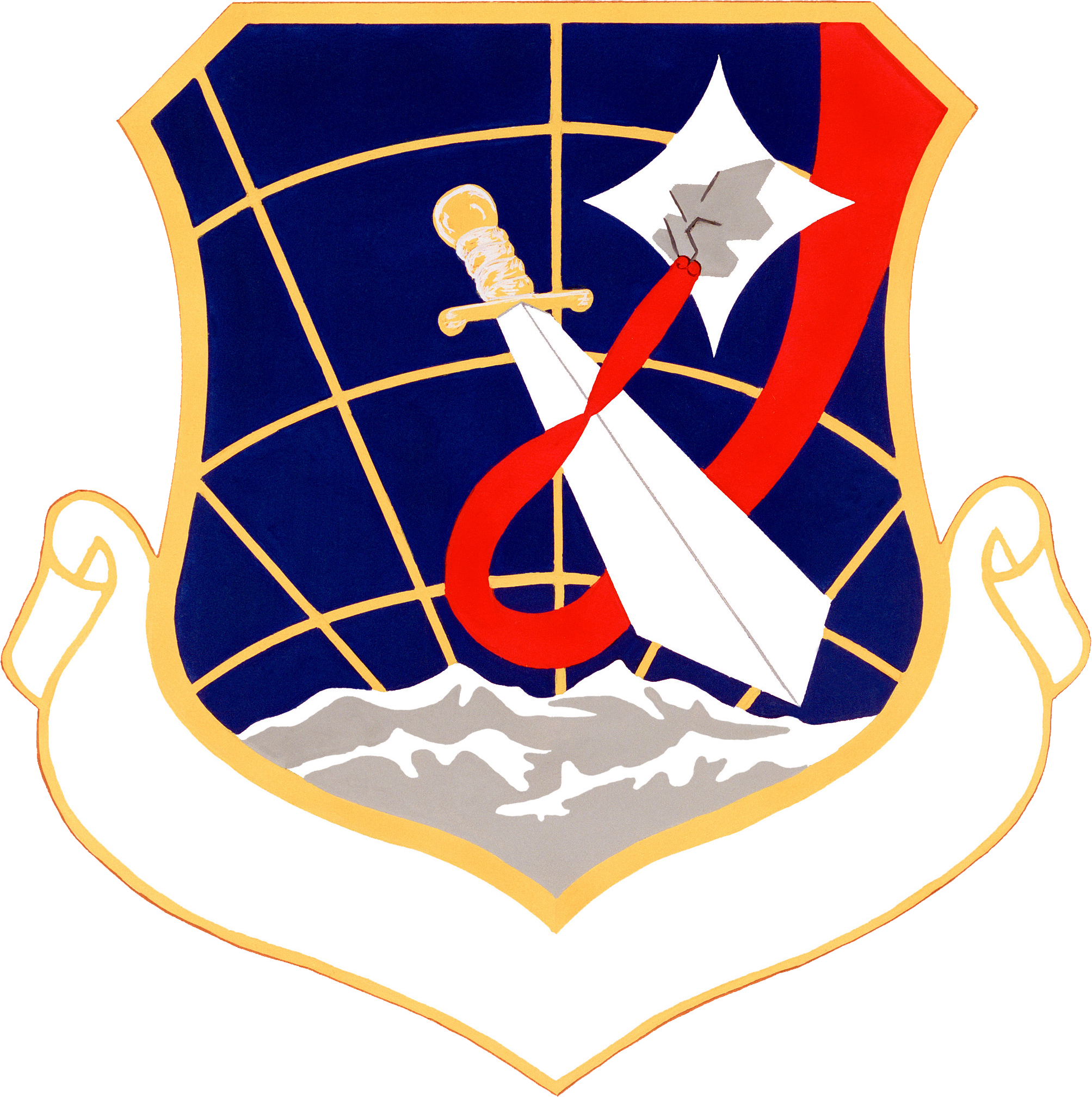
- 11th Tactical Control Group emblem (approved March 1983)

The 11th Air Control Wing is an inactive unit of the United States Air Force, last stationed at Elmendorf Air Force Base, Alaska. It was assigned to the Pacific Air Forces' Eleventh Air Force and was inactivated in 1994.

The wing was activated on 21 June 1948 as the 531st Air Control and Warning Group at McChord Air Force Base, part of the Fourth Air Force. The 626th and 632d Air Control and Warning Squadrons were assigned to the group. Around 25 October 1948, it became part of the 25th Air Division. On 15 July 1949, the group transferred to Elmendorf Air Force Base, where it had remained ever since. The 625th Air Control and Warning Squadron became part of the group on the same day. The group became part of Alaskan Air Command three days before. On 1 June 1950, the group was inactivated. The group was activated again on 17 November 1950 with the 10th Air Division, less the 632d Squadron. It became part of Alaskan Air Command again on 20 July 1951, but was transferred back to the 10th Air Division on 1 November 1952. On 8 December of that year, the 705th, 717th, 719th, 794th, and 795th Aircraft Control and Warning Squadrons joined the group. The group was inactivated on 15 April 1953.

The group was reactivated on 15 November 1977 with the 21st Composite Wing, and included the 705th, 708th, 710th, 711th, 714th, 717th, 719th, 743d, 744th, 748th, 794th, and 795th Aircraft Control and Warning Squadrons. On 30 September 1979, the group became part of Alaskan Air Command, which became the Eleventh Air Force in 1990. It was redesignated the 11th Tactical Control Group on 1 July 1981. The 3d Air Support Operations Squadron (ASOS) became part of the group on the same day. On 1 November 1983, the group's aircraft control and warning squadrons were inactivated. On 6 January 1989, the group became the 11th Tactical Control Wing. The 3rd ASOS was transferred on 1 January 1992. On 27 January 1992, it became the 11th Air Control Wing.

The wing was inactivated 1 July 1994. It was replaced by two groups subordinate to the Eleventh Air Force "..the 611th Air Operations Group and 611th Air Logistics Group, later changed to the 611th Air Support Group."

== Lineage ==
- Constituted as the 531st Aircraft Control and Warning Group

Activated on 21 June 1948
Inactivated on 1 January 1950

- Activated on 17 November 1950

Inactivated on 15 April 1953

- Activated on 15 November 1977

Redesignated 11th Tactical Control Group on 1 July 1981
Redesignated 11th Tactical Control Wing on 6 January 1991
Redesignated 11th Air Control Wing on 27 January 1992
Inactivated on 1 July 1994

=== Assignments ===
- Fourth Air Force: 21 June 1948
- 25th Air Division: c. 25 October 1948
- Alaskan Air Command: 12 July 1949 – 1 January 1950
- 10th Air Division: 17 November 1950
- Alaskan Air Command: 20 July 1951
- 10th Air Division: 1 November 1952 – 13 April 1953
- 21st Composite Wing: 15 November 1977
- Alaskan Air Command (later Eleventh Air Force): 30 September 1979 – 1 July 1994

=== Stations ===
- McChord Air Force Base, Washington, 21 June 1948
- Elmendorf Air Force Base, Alaska, 15 July 1949 – 1 January 1950
- Elmendorf Air Force Base, Alaska, 17 November 1950 – 13 April 1953
- Elmendorf Air Force Base, Alaska, 15 November 1977 – 1 July 1994

=== Components ===
- 11th Operations Group, 27 January 1992 – 1 July 1994
- 625th Aircraft Control and Warning Squadron (later 625th Aircraft Control Squadron), 15 July 1949 – 1 January 1950, 1 November 1950 – 13 April 1953
- 626th Aircraft Control and Warning Squadron, 21 June 1948 – 21 June 1948, c. 30 June 1948 – 1 May 1949, 17 November 1950 – 13 April 1953

Fire Island Air Force Station

- 632d Aircraft Control and Warning Squadron, 21 June 1948 – 1 January 1950
- 705th Aircraft Control and Warning Squadron, 8 December 1952 – 13 April 1953, 15 November 1977 – 1 November 1983

King Salmon Airport

- 708th Aircraft Control and Warning Squadron, 15 November 1977 – 1 November 1983

Indian Mountain Air Force Station

- 710th Aircraft Control and Warning Squadron, 15 November 1977 – 1 November 1983
- 711th Aircraft Control and Warning Squadron, 15 November 1977 – 1 November 1983

Cape Lisburne Air Force Station

- 714th Aircraft Control and Warning Squadron, 15 November 1977 – 1 November 1983

Cold Bay Air Force Station

- 717th Aircraft Control and Warning Squadron, 8 December 1952 – 13 April 1953, 15 November 1977 – 1 November 1983

Tatalina Air Force Station

- 719th Aircraft Control and Warning Squadron, 8 December 1952 – 13 April 1953, 15 November 1977 – 1 November 1983

Sparrevohn Air Force Station

- 743d Aircraft Control and Warning Squadron, 15 November 1977 – 1 November 1983

Campion Air Force Station

- 744th Aircraft Control and Warning Squadron, 15 November 1977 – 1 November 1983

Murphy Dome Air Force Station

- 748th Aircraft Control and Warning Squadron, 15 November 1977 – 1 November 1983

Kotzebue Air Force Station

- 794th Aircraft Control and Warning Squadron, 8 December 1952 – 13 April 1953, 15 November 1977 – 1 November 1983

Cape Newenham Air Force Station

- 795th Aircraft Control and Warning Squadron, 8 December 1952 – 13 April 1953, 15 November 1977 – 1 November 1983

Cape Romanzof Air Force Station
